= Schleswig-Holstein =

State in Germany

State of Schleswig-Holstein Delstat Slesvig-Holsten (Danish) Land Sleswig-Holsteen (Low German) Lönj Slaswik-Holstiinj (North Frisian)
- State
- Flag Coat of arms Brandmark
- Coordinates: 54°28′12″N 9°30′50″E
- Country: Germany
- Capital (and largest city): Kiel

Government
  - Body: Landtag of Schleswig-Holstein
  - Minister-President: Daniel Günther (CDU)
  - Governing parties: CDU / Greens
  - Bundesrat votes: 4 (of 69)
  - Bundestag seats: 25 (of 630) (as of 2025)

Area
  - Total: 15,804.30 km^{2} (6,102.07 sq mi)

Population (31 December 2023)
  - Total: 2,965,691
  - Density: 187.6509/km^{2} (486.0136/sq mi)

GDP
  - Total: €131.247 billion (2025)
  - Per capita: €44,347 (2025)
- Time zone: UTC+1 (CET)
  - Summer (DST): UTC+2 (CEST)
- ISO 3166 code: DE-SH
- Vehicle registration: formerly: S (1945–1947), SH (1947), BS (1948–1956)
- NUTS Region: DEF
- HDI (2022): 0.929 very high · 12th of 16
- Website: schleswig-holstein.de

Schleswig-Holstein, (Note: /ˈʃlɛswɪɡ ˈhoʊlstaɪn/ SHLES-wig HOHL-styne; German: [ˌʃleːsvɪç ˈhɔlʃtaɪn]; Danish: Slesvig-Holsten; Low German: Sleswig-Holsteen; North Frisian: Slaswik-Holstiinj) officially the State of Schleswig-Holstein, (Note: German: Land Schleswig Holstein; Low German: Land Slaswik-Holstiinj; North Frisian: Lönj Slaswik-Holstiinj) is a coastal state that is the northernmost of the sixteen states of Germany, comprising most of the historical Duchy of Holstein and the southern part of the former Duchy of Schleswig. It borders Denmark, Mecklenburg-Vorpommern, Lower Saxony and the city-state of Hamburg. Its capital city is Kiel; other notable cities are Lübeck and Flensburg. It covers an area of 15,763 km^{2} (6,086 sq mi), making it the 5th smallest German state by area (including the city-states). Historically, the name can also refer to a larger region, containing both present-day Schleswig-Holstein and the former South Jutland County (Northern Schleswig; now part of the Region of Southern Denmark) in Denmark.

Schleswig, known as South Jutland at the time, had been under Danish control since the fifth century. In the 12th century, however, it became a duchy within Denmark due to infighting in the Danish royal house. It bordered Holstein, which was a part of the Holy Roman Empire. Beginning in 1460, the King of Denmark ruled both Schleswig and Holstein as their duke. Schleswig was still part of Denmark, while Holstein remained part of the Holy Roman Empire. In the 19th century, both Danes and Germans believed they had a rightful claim to Schleswig-Holstein. While the population of Holstein and Lauenburg was entirely ethnically German, Schleswig had been predominantly Danish until the late 1700s and early 1800s, when extensive German influence led to the Germanization of South Schleswig. The resulting long-term political and territorial dispute was known as the Schleswig-Holstein Question. In 1848, Denmark tried to formally annex the area. Prussia responded by invading, thus beginning the First Schleswig War, which ended in a victory for Denmark. But in the Second Schleswig War (1864), Prussia and Austria won, and the territory was absorbed into Prussia in 1867. After the German defeat in World War I the Allies required that the question of sovereignty over the territory be submitted to plebiscites (the 1920 Schleswig plebiscites). They resulted in the return of the Danish-speaking North Schleswig to Denmark. The area was subsequently renamed South Jutland, restoring the historical name used before it was changed to Schleswig by Gerhard III of the House of Schauenburg. After World War II, Schleswig-Holstein took in over a million refugees.

Today, Schleswig-Holstein's economy is known for its agriculture, such as its Holstein cows. Its position on the Atlantic Ocean makes it a major trade point and shipbuilding site; it is also the location of the Kiel Canal. Its offshore oil wells and wind farms produce significant amounts of energy. Fishing is a major industry and the basis of its distinctive, unique local cuisine. It is a popular tourist destination for Germans and visitors from across the globe.

== History ==
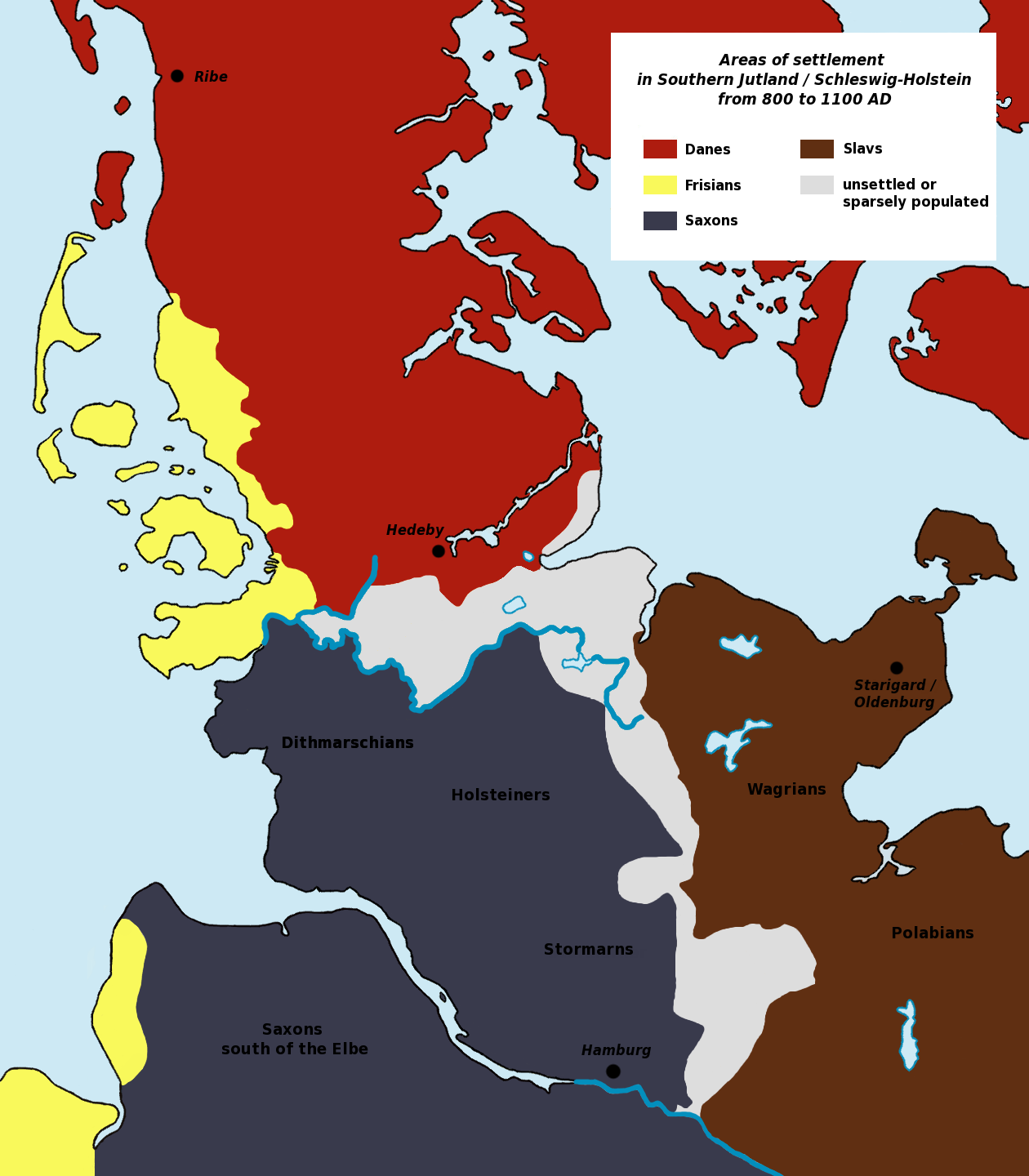
The historic settlement areas in present-day Schleswig-Holstein

The term "Holstein" derives from Old Saxon Holseta Land (Holz means wood in modern Standardized German; holt is a now-archaic English word for woods.) Originally, the term referred to the central of the three Saxon tribes north of the River Elbe: Tedmarsgoi (Dithmarschen), Holstein, and Sturmarii (Stormarn). The area inhabited by the tribe of the Holsts lay between the Stör River and Hamburg; after Christianization, their main church was in Schenefeld. Saxon Holstein became a part of the Holy Roman Empire after Charlemagne's Saxon campaigns in the late eighth century. Beginning in 811, the northern border of Holstein (and thus of the Empire) was the River Eider.

The term "Schleswig" originally referred to the city of Schleswig. The word Schleswig is a German transliteration of the Danish word Slesvig, which consists of two words: Schlei and vig. The Schlei refers to the river at which the city lies, and vig means "inlet" or bay. Schleswig, therefore, means (in Danish): "The bay at the river Schlei". The Schlei is known as Slien in Danish and is believed to have been used only for the inner Slien (the Great and Little Bay near the city of Schleswig). The word is thought to be related to Slæ, which means reeds and aquatic plants found in this area.

The Duchy of Schleswig, or Southern Jutland, was originally an integral part of Denmark, but in medieval times was established as a fief under the control of the Kingdom of Denmark, having the same relationship with the Danish Crown as, for example, Brandenburg or Bavaria had with the Holy Roman Emperor. Around 1100, the Duchy of Saxony gave Holstein to Count Adolf I of Schauenburg.

=== The Migration Period ===
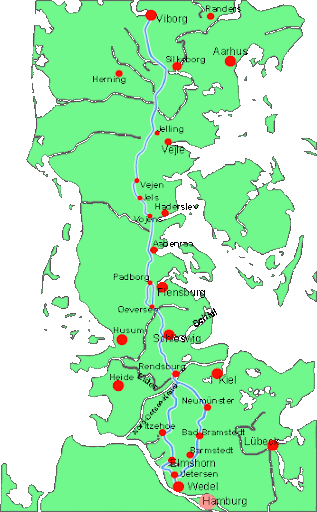
The Hærvejen, starting at its northern terminus in Viborg and reaching its southern terminus in Hamburg

During the Migration Period, the Jutland peninsula was home to several tribes. The Jutes inhabited the most northern part of the peninsula from Grenen to Olger's Dyke. This dyke, dating back to around the first century, served as the boundary between the Jutes in the north and the Angles in the south. This dyke lost its relevance in the 200s when the Angles expanded northward, leading to the establishment of a new dyke called the Wendish Dyke. The southern border of the Angles was marked by the marshes surrounding the Eider, that combined with the dense old-growth forest to the south of the river, formed a natural barrier. South of the forest lay the region now known as Holstein, which was divided between the Germanic Saxons, who inhabited the western part, and the Slavic Wagri, who lived in the eastern part. In the 8th century, the Wagri became part of the Slavic tribal confederation known as the Obotrites (also known as the Wends by the Danes and Saxons).

During the 4th and early 5th centuries, a significant migration saw the Jutes, Angles, and Saxons depart from their homelands to settle in the British Isles. This mass exodus left much of the Jutland Peninsula sparsely populated, allowing the Danes from southern Scandinavia and the islands of Zealand, Funen, and other smaller Danish isles to migrate into the peninsula. They gradually settled the region, integrating the remaining Jutes and Angles who had not left for Britain. By the mid-5th century, the Danes had established settlements from Grenen in the north to just north of the Eider River and its marshes. Their southernmost settlements being around Schwansen, Hedeby and Husum, mirroring the same southern border as their Angle predecessors. As raiding was a frequent practice among the Danes, Saxons, and Wagrians, the borderlands was a hostile and unsafe area to inhabit. In response to these threats, the Danes began constructing the Danevirke. Originally built as a dyke, it was gradually expanded into a 30-kilometer earthwork with a palisade fortification, forming a barrier between the Danes and their southern neighbors. The Danevirke was strategically positioned at the narrowest point of the peninsula, with its eastern end beginning at the Treene River and extending to the Schlei Bay. This fortification served to deter Saxon and Wagrian raids while enabling the Danes to launch their own raids into southern territories. It would remain in use until 1864, being expanded and adapted to the changing military needs of the Danes multiple times.

The establishment of the Danevirke not only helped to prevent Saxon and Wagrian raids into Danish territory but also served as a toll station. Danish chieftains would collect fees from traders, merchants, and peasants traveling along the Hærvejen (Heerweg/Armyway), the main trade route running through the peninsula. Saxons, Wagrians, and Danes alike used the Hærvejen to trade goods such as honey, furs, amber, glass, metalwork, and other commodities, such as livestock, with cattle and oxen being particularly important. Especially the Danes developed a thriving livestock breeding industry, driving large herds along the Hærvejen to sell on the continent. This trade gave the route its alternative names, such as "Studevejen" (Cattle Way) in Danish and "Ochsenweg" (Oxen Way) in German. Therefore control of the Danevirke, through which the Hærvejen ran, was of immense financial significance. Whoever controlled the gates of Danevirke also controlled the trade along the Hærvejen, giving them access to substantial wealth.

=== The Early Middle Ages ===
After approximately 350 to 400 years of Danes being the sole inhabitants north of the Eider, the Frisians arrived in two waves, the first of which occurred in the 800s. They came from Frisia and initially settled on the islands of Heligoland, Sylt, Föhr, and Amrum in the southwestern part of Jutland. Later, they expanded to Eiderstedt and the Jutish coastline. These areas eventually became known as North Frisia, though historically, the region was referred to as Uthlande (Outland). In these settlements, the Frisians established fishing and trading stations. The local Danes soon became a minority and, over time, assimilated into the Frisian population. The Frisians contributed to the broader Hærvejen trade network, with sea routes extending along the Frisian and Dutch coasts, supplying high-quality salt, fish, and other maritime goods. Moreover, they were particularly active in trade with East Anglia in England, where pottery was exchanged in large quantities.

==== Saxon Wars ====
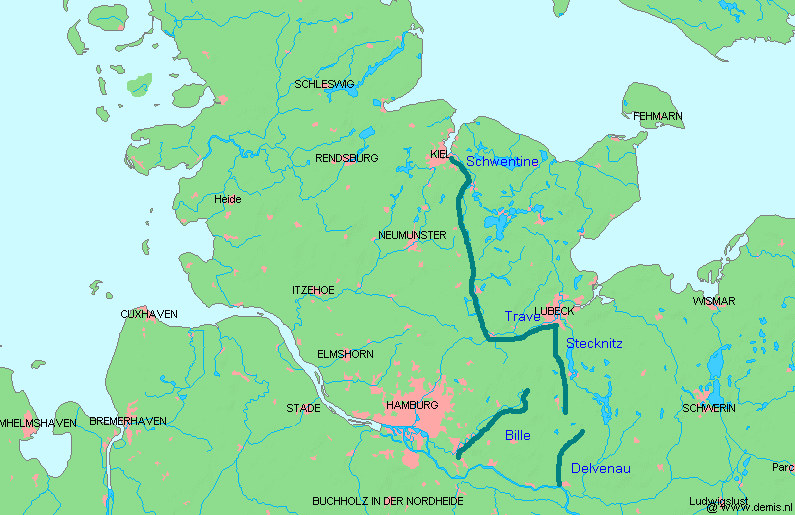
The Limes Saxoniae border between the Saxons and the Obotrites, established about 810 in present-day Schleswig-Holstein

Normalcy in the area vanished with the expansion of the Frankish Empire into Saxony from 772 to 804, triggering a generational war on an unprecedented scale for the region. Before this, the Franks had spent nearly 20 years, from the late 600s to the early 700s, subjugating and converting the Frisian Kingdom. Their primary opponent was the formidable Frisian king Redbad, who fiercely resisted the Franks until his death. Now, the Frisians' neighbors, the Saxons, faced Frankish expansion. The casus belli was a Saxon raid on the church in Deventer in January of 772. This conflict, fueled by Charlemagne's desire to conquer the Saxons and convert them from their belief in the Germanic pantheon to Christianity, used the Deventer raid as a pretext to wage a war that would ultimately reshape the political and cultural landscape of what would later become Holstein forever. Throughout 18 campaigns, carried out in three phases over 32 years, Charlemagne aimed to subdue the Saxons and forcibly convert them to Christianity, in what became known as the Saxon Wars. In retaliation for the raid on the church in Deventer, Charlemagne ordered his troops to destroy the holy pillar Irminsul, near Paderborn in either 772 or 773—a notorious act that sent shockwaves throughout the Germanic pagan world. It has been postulated that Irminsul symbolised Yggdrasil Ash - the world tree. Charlemagne then destroyed all Saxon settlements up to the Wesser river. After defeating the Saxons and securing hostages, he turned his attention to northern Italy.

For centuries, the Danes and Saxons had regarded each other as kindred peoples, sharing the same belief in the Germanic pantheon and frequently intermarrying, especially among the elite. Thus, the defeated Saxon warleader Widukind sought refuge with his father-in-law, Danish king Sigfred. The Royal Frankish Annals mentions that Widukind received substantial aid from Sigfred, though the exact nature of this aid is not explicitly stated. However, the chronicles do note that Sigfred and Charlemagne brokered a peace agreement some years later, indicating that Sigfred, upon hearing Widukind's plea, may have mustered his army and joined the war on the side of the Saxons. In response to the Danes' involvement in the war, Charlemagne seems to have recruited the Obotrites by promising them the Saxon portion of Holstein. This alliance with Charlemagne shifted the balance of power in the region. In 782, after another defeat of the Saxons, Charlemagne ordered the mass execution of 4,500 Saxons, an atrocity that became known as the Massacre of Verden. Following this brutal act, Charlemagne was nicknamed the "Butcher of Saxons" or "Saxonslaughterer."

In 796, despite Saxony being fully under Frankish rule, the Saxons rose once more, supported by the Danes. The rebellion was triggered by the forced conscription of Saxons for the Frankish wars against the Avars. Moreover, Charlemagne, in alliance with the Obotrites, planned to subjugate the Danes, now led by King Gudfred Sigfredson. However, Gudfred struck first. He expanded the Danevirke, assembled a fleet, mustered an army, and launched attacks on the Obotrites and later Frankish Frisia. But he was slain, either by one of his huscarls or possibly his own illegitimate son, on the Frisian campaign. The new Danish king, Hemming, Gudfred's nephew, initiated peace talks, which resulted in the Treaty of Heiligen in 810. The treaty established the Danish border at the Eider River. Charlemagne retained Saxony, including Holstein, and established the Limes Saxoniae as a border with the Obotrites. This agreement established firm boundaries between the Franks, Obotrites, and Danes, securing peace in the region.

=== Duchies in the Danish realm ===
Between 500 and 1200, Schleswig was an integral part of Denmark, but during the 12th century, Duke Abel of Schlewig came into conflict with his brother King Eric IV. Abel managed to gain autonomy from his brother, making Schleswig an autonomous duchy. Later, Abel had Eric assassinated and seized the throne. Despite this, Schleswig remained an autonomous duchy within the Kingdom, setting the stage for future conflicts. Beginning in 1460, both the Duchy of Schleswig and Duchy of Holstein were ruled together by the Danish king, who acted as the duke of both regions. Holstein, being a duchy within the Holy Roman Empire, created a situation where the Danish king was sovereign of Denmark but also a duke within the Holy Roman Empire. Both were ruled for several centuries by the kings of Denmark. In 1721, all of Schleswig was united into a single duchy under the king of Denmark, and the great powers of Europe confirmed in an international treaty that all future kings of Denmark should automatically become dukes of Schleswig: consequently, Schleswig would always follow the order of succession that applied in the Kingdom of Denmark.

After the Protestant Reformation, German was established as the language of commerce, administration, education, and clergy in Schleswig despite the population being ethnically Danish. This was because Schleswig was managed by the German Chancellery in Kiel, which was later renamed the Schleswig-Holstein Chancellery in 1806. Therefore, Danes were sent to Kiel for their education instead of Copenhagen, where they received their education in German rather than their native Danish. As a result, Danish students, future administrators, clergy, and educators were taught in German and continued to use the language throughout their professional lives.

In 1814, mandatory schooling was instituted, and it was taught in German. This created generations of Danish children who learned German from an early age. Their schooling was conducted in German, they heard Sermons in German, and when they grew up, their interactions with the administration and business were conducted in German. Additionally, if Danes didn't learn German, they couldn't communicate with the administration, which often cared little if the citizens were able to understand them. Therefore, if the Danes weren't able to speak German, they were effectively frozen out of any official matters. As a result, a language shift slowly began forming in South Schleswig and gradually spread north, which alarmed Copenhagen. The Danish authorities started taking countermeasures to halt the language shift by banning German in all official matters in Schleswig, which only served to create tensions between Danes and Germans. This language strife significantly contributed to shaping the inhabitants' national sentiments during a time of national unrest in Europe. It is also during this period that we see surname changes, such as from Jørgensen to Jürgensen or Nielsen to Nilsen, in South Schleswig. By the time of the First Schleswig War, one-third of Schleswig and half of South Schleswig spoke German as their first language. By the time of the Second Schleswig War in 1864, half of Schleswig and the vast majority of South Schleswig spoke German as their first language.

=== Schleswig-Holstein Question ===
In the 19th century, fueled by nationalism, both Danes and Germans claimed Schleswig-Holstein. The Germans wanted both Schleswig and Holstein to separate from Denmark and join the German Confederation, invoking the Treaty of Ribe stating that the two duchies should stay "Forever Undivided". The Danes, on the other hand, furthered the Eider Policy (da:Ejderpolitikken), stating that the natural Danish border was the Eider (river) as first recognised in the Treaty of Heiligen. Therefore, the Danes sought to reintegrate Schleswig into the Kingdom of Denmark, reversing the separation created by King Abel, while also granting Holstein independence to join the German Confederation as a sovereign entity. The resulting long-term political and territorial dispute was known as the Schleswig-Holstein Question. Holstein was entirely German-speaking, while Schleswig was predominantly Danish-speaking until the late 1700s and early 1800s. During this period, a linguistic shift began in southern Schleswig, transitioning from Danish to German. This meant that Schleswig was linguistically divided with a Danish-speaking north and a German-speaking south.

In 1848, King Frederick VII of Denmark declared that he would grant Denmark a liberal constitution and the immediate goal of the Danish national movement was to ensure that this constitution would give rights to all Danes, i.e. not only to those in the Kingdom of Denmark, but also to Danes (and Germans) living in Schleswig. Furthermore, they demanded protection for the Danish language in Schleswig (the dominant language in almost a quarter of Schleswig had changed from Danish to German since the beginning of the 19th century). A liberal constitution for Holstein was not seriously considered in Copenhagen, since it was well known that the political élite of Holstein were more conservative than Copenhagen's. Representatives of German-minded Schleswig-Holsteiners demanded that Schleswig and Holstein be unified and allowed its own constitution and that Schleswig join Holstein as a member of the German Confederation. These demands were rejected by the Danish government in 1848, and the Germans of Holstein and Southern Schleswig rebelled.

==== First Schleswig War ====
This began the First Schleswig War (1848–51). Against unbelievable odds, Denmark emerged victorious, managing to politically outmaneuver the German alliance by garnering support from the British Empire, the Russian Empire and the Second French Empire while defeating the Germans at the Battles of Bov, the Dybbøl, the Fredericia and Isted. However, under pressure from the Great Powers, led by Tsar Alexander II, who had forced Prussia and Austria out of Denmark, the Danes were not permitted to reintegrate Schleswig into Denmark. Alexander thereby sought to preserve the existing European order, per the principles established by the Concert of Europe. This led to the signing of the 1852 London Protocol, which failed to provide a solution to the issue and merely upheld the status quo.

==== Second Schleswig War ====
In 1863, conflict broke out again when Frederick VII died without legitimate issue. According to the order of succession of Denmark and Schleswig, the crowns of both Denmark and Schleswig would pass to Duke Christian of Glücksburg, who became Christian IX. The transmission of the duchy of Holstein to the head of the (German-oriented) branch of the Danish royal family, the House of Augustenborg, was more controversial. The separation of the two duchies was challenged by the Augustenborg heir, who claimed, as in 1848, to be the rightful heir of both Schleswig and Holstein. A common constitution for Denmark and Schleswig was promulgated in November 1863, which was a breach of the 1852 London Protocol. This left Denmark politically isolated and led to the Second Schleswig War, with Prussia and Austria invading once again. Denmark achieved some initial victories at the Battles of Mysunde, and Sankelmark, but these successes were short-lived. The Austrians defeated the Danes at the Königshügel and Vejle. However, it was the Prussians who decided the war by decisively winning the pivotal Battles of Dybbøl and Als.

British attempts to mediate in the London Conference of 1864 failed. With the peace Treaty of Vienna (1864), Denmark was forced to cede Schleswig, Holstein, and Lauenburg to Prussia and Austria. Prussia wished to annex the conquered territories, but Austria insisted they be held as condominiums. This disagreement led to the 1865 Gastein Convention, which, despite its casus belli being the defence of the German-speaking Schleswig-Holsteiners' wish to remain unified, granted Schleswig and Lauenburg to Prussia and Holstein to Austria. However, this situation did not last long.

=== Austro-Prussian War and Province of Prussia ===
In 1866, the Austro-Prussian War broke out, in which Prussia quickly defeated Austria and its allies. In the 1866 Peace of Prague, Prussia gained Holstein in addition to Schleswig and Lauenburg. Contrary to the hopes of German Schleswig-Holsteiners, the area did not gain its independence, but was annexed to Prussia, becoming the Province of Schleswig-Holstein in 1868; Lauenburg remained a separate entity until it was incorporated as Kreis Herzogtum Lauenburg in 1876.

The Peace of Prague also led to the dissolution of the loose (confederal) Austrian-led German Confederation and the establishment of the far more integrated (federal) Prussian-led North German Confederation, of which Schleswig-Holstein was now part as a Prussian Province; the North German Confederation became the German Empire in 1871.

Section five of the Peace of Prague had also stipulated that the people of Northern Schleswig would be consulted in a referendum on whether to remain under Prussian rule or return to Danish rule. This condition, however, was never fulfilled by Prussia. During the decades of Prussian rule within the German Empire, authorities attempted a Germanisation policy in the northern part of Schleswig, which remained predominantly Danish. The period also meant increased industrialisation of Schleswig-Holstein and the use of Kiel and Flensburg as important Imperial German Navy locations. The northernmost part and the west coast of the province saw a wave of emigration to America, while some Danes of North Schleswig emigrated to Denmark.

=== Plebiscite in 1920 ===
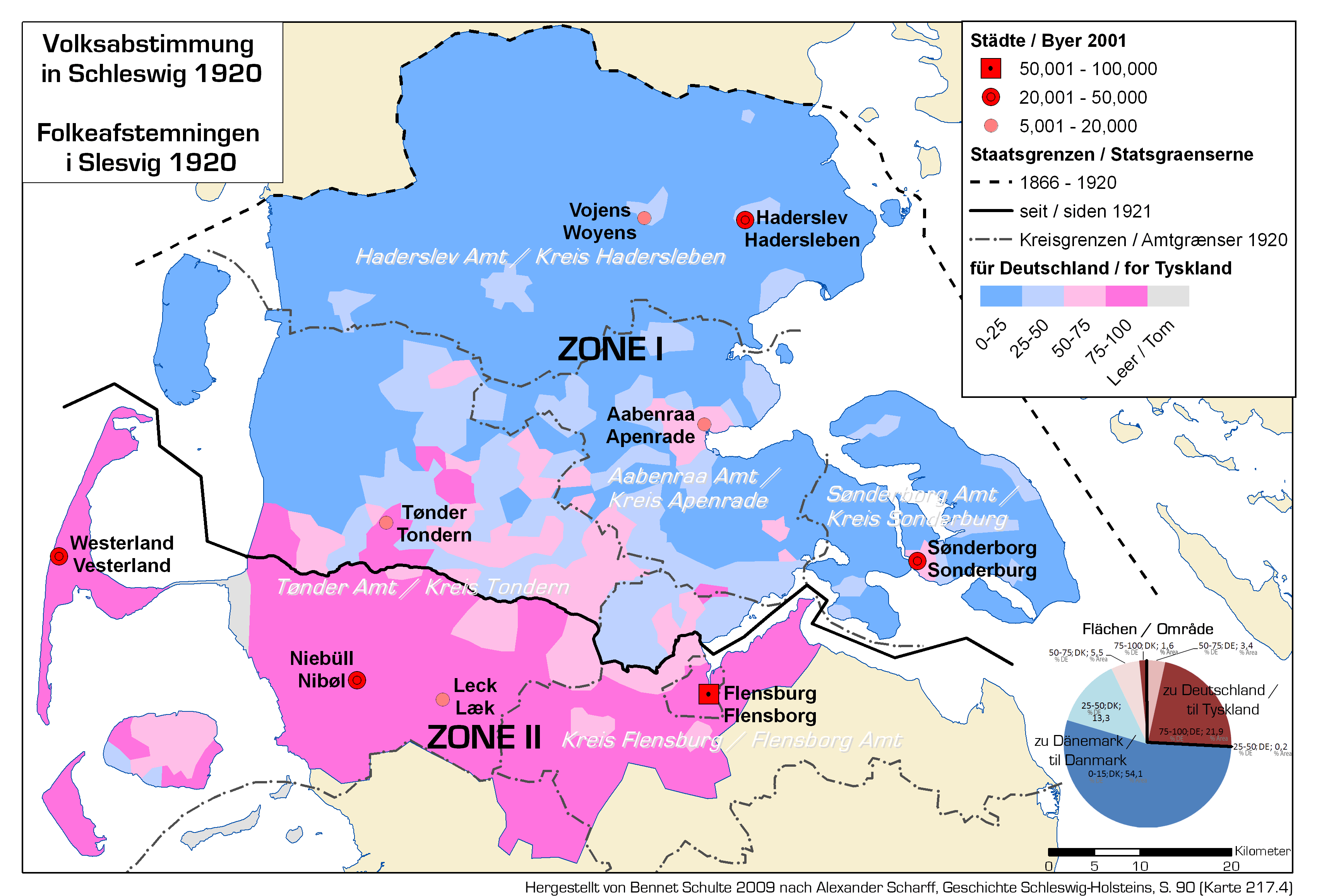
Results of the 1920 plebiscites in North and Central Schleswig

After the defeat of Germany in World War I, the Allied powers arranged a plebiscite in northern and central Schleswig. The plebiscite was conducted under the auspices of an international commission, which designated two voting zones to cover the northern and south-central parts of Schleswig. Steps were taken to also create a third zone covering a southern area, but zone III was cancelled again and never voted, as the Danish government asked the commission not to expand the plebiscite to this area.

In zone I covering Northern Schleswig (10 February 1920), 75% voted for reunification with Denmark and 25% voted for Germany. In zone II covering central Schleswig (14 March 1920), the results were reversed; 80% voted for Germany and just 20% for Denmark. Only minor areas on the island of Föhr showed a Danish majority, and the rest of the Danish vote was primarily in the town of Flensburg. On 15 June 1920, Northern Schleswig officially returned to Danish rule. The Danish/German border was the only one of the borders imposed on Germany by the Treaty of Versailles after World War I that was never challenged by the Nazis.

In 1937, the Nazis passed the so-called Greater Hamburg Act (Groß-Hamburg-Gesetz), where the nearby Free and Hanseatic City of Hamburg was expanded, to encompass towns that had formerly belonged to the Prussian province of Schleswig-Holstein. To compensate Prussia for these losses (and partly because Hitler had a personal dislike for Lübeck), the 711-year-long independence of the Hansestadt Lübeck came to an end, and almost all its territory was incorporated into Schleswig-Holstein, along with the Oldenburg exclave centred on Eutin (for historical reasons known as Landesteil Lübeck).

=== State of Federal Germany ===
After World War II, the Prussian province of Schleswig-Holstein came under British occupation. On 23 August 1946, the military government abolished the province and reconstituted it as a separate Land.

On 9 September 1946, the British and Soviets offered Denmark South Schleswig, in the Septembernote. In this note, they gave Denmark carte blanche on how to deal with the German-speaking South Schleswigers, whether to integrate them into the Danish state or to forcibly expel them from South Schleswig, as was being done to Germans in Eastern Europe. Denmark's then Prime Minister, the Liberal Party's Knud Kristensen, enthusiastically accepted the offer of South Schleswig reunification with Denmark. A survey showed that 75% of the Danish population supported the incorporation, 500,000 signatures had been collected in support of it, and the Danish South Schleswig Association had sent the government a formal request for incorporation. However, the dominating Social Liberal Party feared that Denmark might again face destructive wars like the two Schleswig Wars once Germany recovered from World War II. Given that the Germans had conquered Denmark in six hours during the German invasion of Denmark, they believed Denmark would not stand a chance in such a scenario. Therefore, they pressured the Prime Minister to call for new elections, where the Liberal Party did not secure enough votes to form a government. The Social Democrats won the election with a minority government and could not gather a strong enough mandate for the incorporation of South Schleswig. This outcome created outrage within the Danish population and was considered a scandal.

Due to the forced migrations of Germans between 1944 and 1950, Schleswig-Holstein took in almost a million refugees after the war, increasing its population by 33%. A pro-Danish political movement arose in Schleswig, with transfer of the area to Denmark as an ultimate goal. This was supported neither by the British occupation administration nor the Danish government. In 1955, the German and Danish governments issued the Bonn-Copenhagen Declarations confirming the rights of the ethnic minorities on both sides of the border. Conditions between the nationalities have since been stable and generally respectful.

== Geography ==
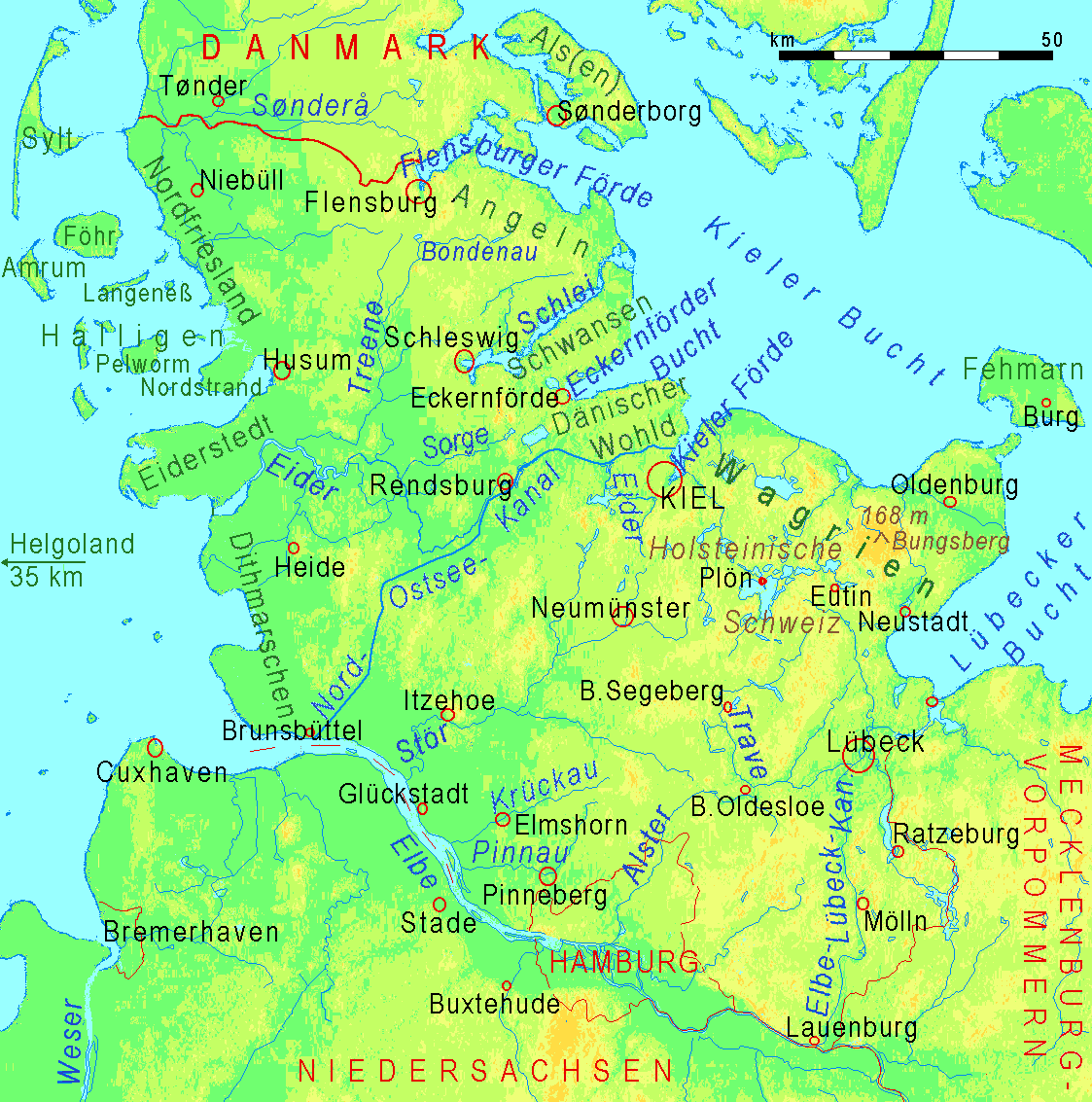
Topographic map of Schleswig-Holstein

Schleswig-Holstein lies on the base of Jutland Peninsula between the North Sea and the Baltic Sea. Strictly speaking, "Schleswig" refers to the German Southern Schleswig (German: Südschleswig or Landesteil Schleswig, Danish: Sydslesvig), whereas Northern Schleswig is in Denmark (South Jutland County, Region of Southern Denmark). The state of Schleswig-Holstein further consists of Holstein, as well as Lauenburg and the formerly independent city of Lübeck.

Schleswig-Holstein borders Denmark (Southern Denmark) to the north, the North Sea to the west, the Baltic Sea to the east, and the German states of Lower Saxony, Hamburg, and Mecklenburg-Vorpommern to the south. In the western part of the state, the lowlands have virtually no hills. The North Frisian Islands, as well as almost all of Schleswig-Holstein's North Sea coast, form the Schleswig-Holstein Wadden Sea National Park (Nationalpark Schleswig-Holsteinisches Wattenmeer), which is the largest national park in Central Europe.

The Baltic Sea coast in the east of Schleswig-Holstein is marked by bays, fjords, and cliff lines. Rolling hills (the highest elevation is the Bungsberg at 168 metres or 551 feet) and many lakes are found, especially in the eastern part of Holstein called the Holstein Switzerland and the former Duchy of Lauenburg (Herzogtum Lauenburg). The longest river besides the Elbe is the Eider. Among the states of Germany, Schleswig-Holstein has the least area covered by forest, 11%, which is less than in the city-states of Hamburg and Bremen. (The national average is 32%).

The German Islands of Sylt, Föhr, Pellworm, Amrum, Heligoland and Fehmarn are part of Schleswig-Holstein, with the latter being the largest and the only Island of Schleswig-Holstein located on the east coast. Heligoland is Germany's only high-sea island.

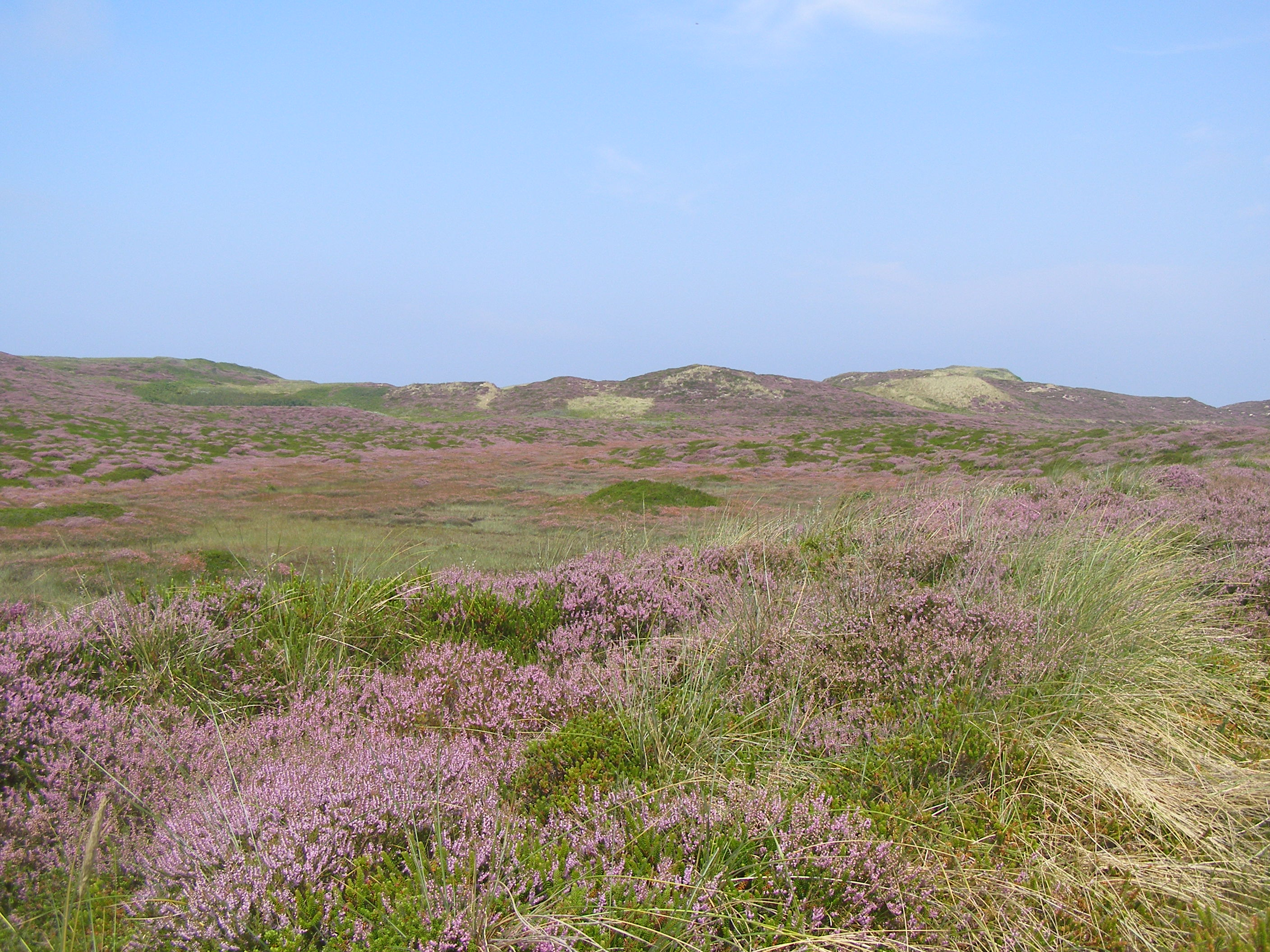
Geest (Island Sylt)

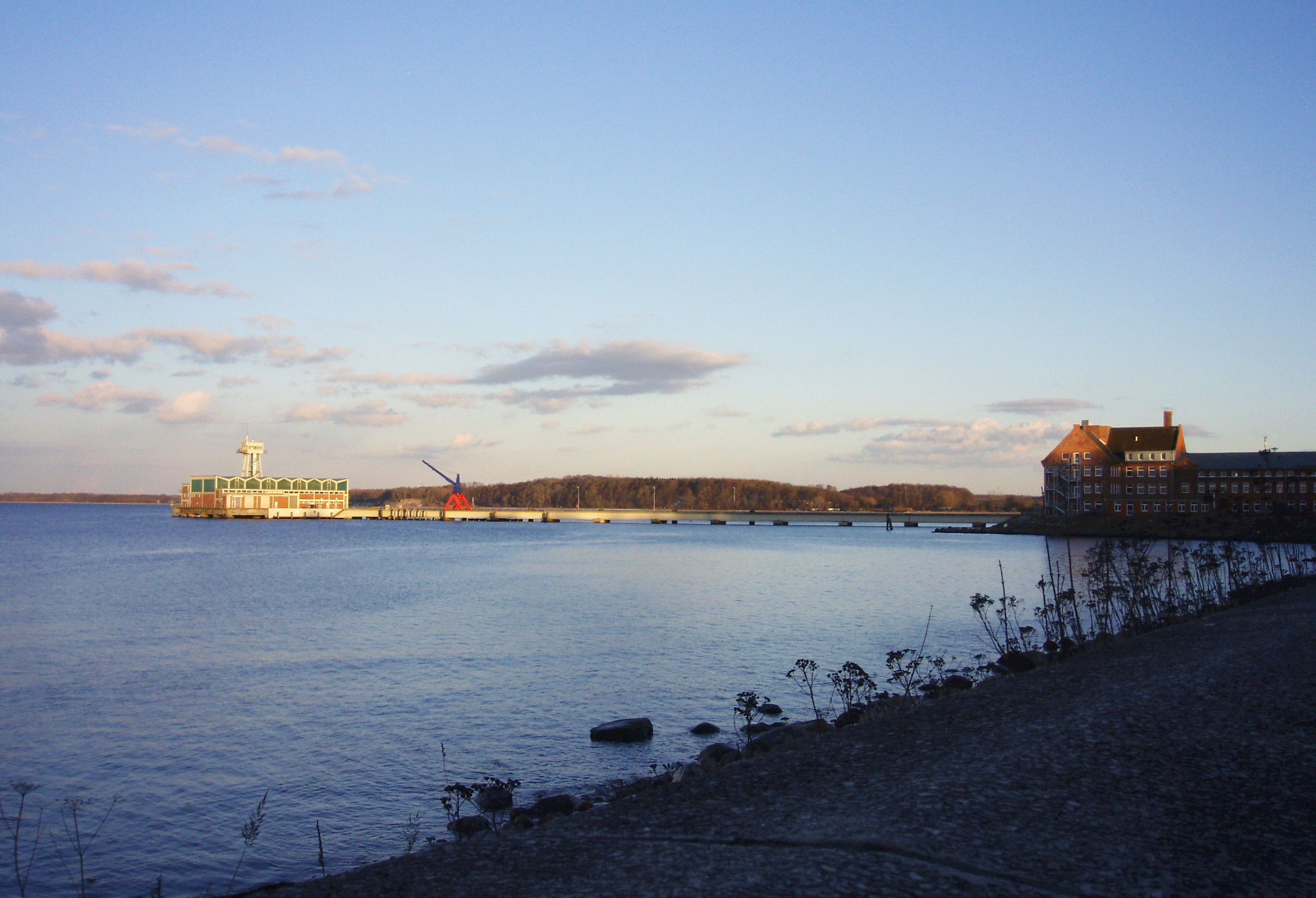
Eckernförde Bay

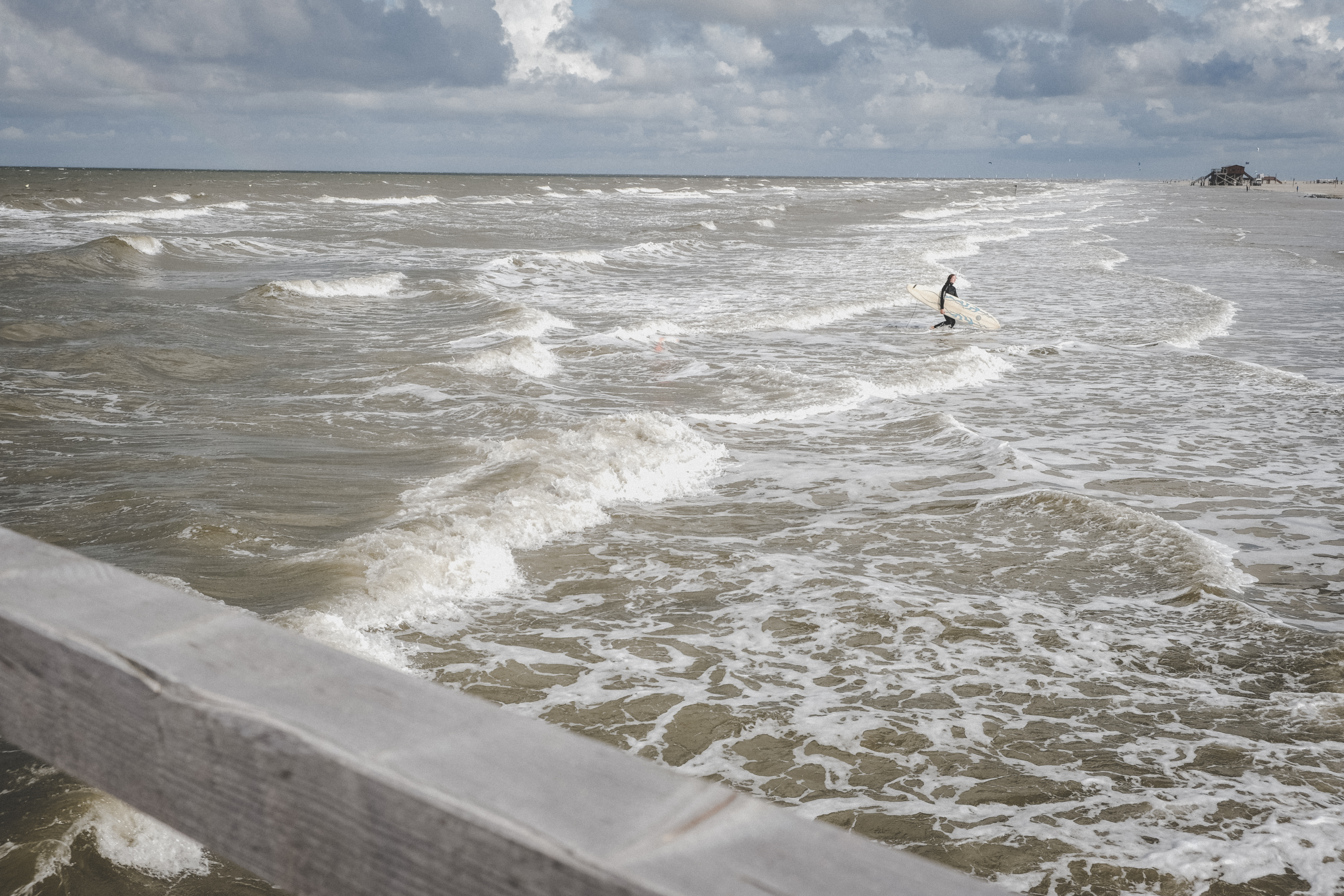
Wadden Sea

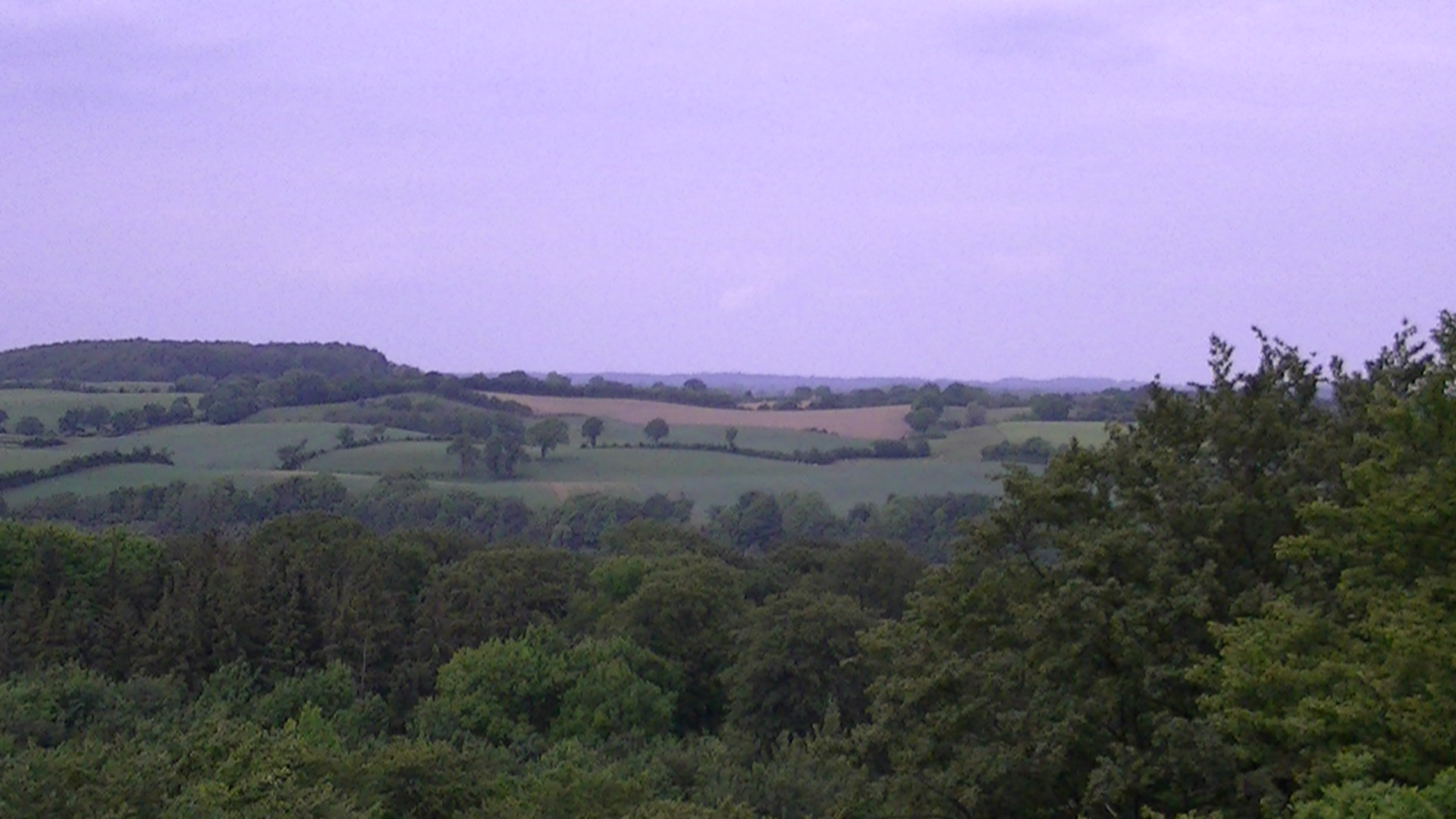
Schleswig-Holsteinische Schweiz

== Administration ==
Districts of Schleswig-Holstein

=== Administrative Division ===
Schleswig-Holstein is divided into 11 Kreise (Districts) and four Kreisfreie Städte (Urban Districts).

	Kreis	License Plate	Area
1	Coat of Arms of Dithmarschen Dithmarschen	HEI, MED	1,428.17 km^{2}
2	Coat of Arms of the Duchy of Lauenburg Herzogtum Lauenburg	RZ	1,263.07 km^{2}
3	Coat of Arms of Northern Frisia Nordfriesland	NF	2,083.56 km^{2}
4	Coat of Arms of Ostholstein Ostholstein	OH	1,393.02 km^{2}
5	Coat of Arms of Pinneberg Pinneberg	PI	664.25 km^{2}
6	Coat of Arms of Plön Plön	PLÖ	1,083.56 km^{2}
7	Coat of Arms of Rendsburg-Eckernförde Rendsburg-Eckernförde	RD, ECK	2,189.79 km^{2}
8	Coat of Arms of Schleswig-Flensburg Schleswig-Flensburg	SL	2,071.28 km^{2}
9	Coat of Arms of Segeberg Segeberg	SE	1,344.47 km^{2}
10	Coat of Arms of Steinburg Steinburg	IZ	1,055.70 km^{2}
11	Coat of Arms of Stormarn Stormarn	OD	766.22 km^{2}
Urban District	Coat of Arms of Kiel Kiel	KI	118.65 km^{2}
Urban District	Coat of Arms of Lübeck Lübeck	HL	214.19 km^{2}
Urban District	Coat of Arms of Neumünster Neumünster	NMS	71.66 km^{2}
Urban District	Coat of Arms of Flensburg Flensburg	FL	56.73 km^{2}

=== Legislature ===
Schleswig-Holstein has its own parliament and government, which are located in the state capital city of Kiel.

=== Executive Branch ===
The Minister-President of Schleswig-Holstein is elected by the Landtag of Schleswig-Holstein.

Portfolio	Minister	Party	Took office	Left office	State secretaries
Minister-President	Daniel Günther born 24 July 1973 (age 53)	CDU	29 June 2022	Incumbent	
Deputy Minister-President	Aminata Touré born 15 November 1992 (age 34)	GRÜNE	1 August 2024	Incumbent	
Minister for Social Affairs, Youth, Family, Seniors, Integration and Equality	Aminata Touré born 15 November 1992 (age 34)	GRÜNE	29 June 2022	Incumbent	Johannes Albig
Deputy Minister-President Minister for Finance	Monika Heinold born 30 December 1958 (age 67)	GRÜNE	29 June 2022	1 August 2024	Silke Torp; Oliver Rabe
Minister for Finance	Silke Schneider born 2 September 1967 (age 59)	GRÜNE	1 August 2024	Incumbent	Silke Torp; Oliver Rabe
Minister for Justice and Health	Kerstin von der Decken born 22 November 1968 (age 57)	CDU	29 June 2022	Incumbent	Otto Carstens; Oliver Grundei
Minister for Education, Training, Science, Research and Culture	Karin Prien born 26 June 1965 (age 61)	CDU	29 June 2022	Incumbent	Dorit Stenke; Guido Wendt
Minister for Interior, Communities, Housing and Sport	Sabine Sütterlin-Waack born 15 February 1958 (age 68)	CDU	29 June 2022	Incumbent	Jörg Sibbel; Magdalena Finke
Minister for Energy Transition, Climate Protection, Environment and Nature	Tobias Goldschmidt born 16 September 1981 (age 45)	GRÜNE	29 June 2022	Incumbent	Katja Günther; Joschka Knuth
Minister for Economics, Transport, Labour, Technology, and Tourism	Claus Ruhe Madsen born 27 August 1972 (age 54)	CDU(Independent until May 2023, CDU nomination)	29 June 2022	Incumbent	Tobias von der Heide; Julia Carstens
Minister for Agriculture, Rural Areas, Europe and Consumer Protection	Werner Schwarz born 10 April 1960 (age 66)	CDU	29 June 2022	Incumbent	Anne Benett-Sturies
Chief of the State Chancellery	Dirk Schrödter born 17 October 1978 (age 48)	CDU	29 June 2022	Incumbent	Johannes Callsen; Sandra Gerken

==== Recent elections ====
State elections were held on 8 May 2022. The current government is a coalition of the Christian Democratic Union (CDU) and The Greens, led by Minister-President Daniel Günther.

== Demographics ==
Historical population
Year	Pop.	±%
1960	2,309,409	—
1970	2,510,608	+8.7%
1980	2,611,285	+4.0%
1990	2,626,127	+0.6%
2001	2,804,249	+6.8%
2011	2,800,119	−0.1%
2022	2,927,542	+4.6%

Schleswig-Holstein has an aging population. Since 1972, there has been a decrease in the natural rate of population change. In 2016, the total fertility rate reached 1.61, the highest value in 40 years (the average value being 1.4). In 2016, there were 25,420 births and 33,879 deaths, resulting in a natural decrease of −8,459.

Fluctuations 1970–2015

Year	Births	Deaths	Influx	Outflux	Balance	TFR
1970	35,171	32,990	100,586	76,572	24,014	
1975	24,282	32,993	75,949	69,169	– 1,931	
1980	24,545	31,278	80,137	61,123	+12,281	
1985	23,099	31,330	65,537	56 951	+355	
1990	29,046	31,461	153,275	119,339	+31,521	1,47
1995	27,430	31,288	114,799	93,872	+17,069	1,33
2000	26,920	29,821	79,416	64,029	+12,486	1,43
2005	23,027	29,669	74,534	63,786	+4,106	1,37
2010	22,578	31,201	76,032	65,209	+2,200	1,45
2015	23,549	33,663	111,661	74,317	+27,230	1,51

=== Vital statistics ===
- Births from January–September 2016 = ▲19,138
- Births from January–September 2017 = ▼19,086
- Deaths from January–September 2016 = ▼25,153
- Deaths from January–September 2017 = ▲25,832
- Natural growth from January–September 2016 = ▲ -6,015
- Natural growth from January–September 2017 = ▼ -6,746

=== Religion ===
Religion in Schleswig-Holstein – 2025
Religion	Percent
None or other	59.8%
EKD Protestants	35.2%
Roman Catholics	5.0%

The region has been strongly Protestant since the time of the Protestant Reformation. It is proportionally the most Protestant of the sixteen modern states. In 2025, 59.8% of the population was not religious or adhered to religions other than the Evangelical Church or Catholicism. 35.2% of the population belonged to the Protestant Church in Germany, the largest religious body, and 5.0% to the Roman Catholic Church.

=== Foreigners ===
Largest groups of foreign residents by 31 December 2023

Significant foreign resident populations
Nationality	Population (31 December 2022)	Population (31 December 2023)
Ukraine	38,785	38,970
Syria	32,470	38,610
Turkey	28,395	30,845
Poland	29,785	29,795
Afghanistan	18,285	22,040
Romania	20,255	20,590
Iraq	12,395	13,805
Bulgaria	10,470	11,215
Russia	8,240	9,290
Denmark	7,365	6,430
Italy	5,875	6,210

== Culture ==
Schleswig-Holstein combines Danish, Frisian, and German aspects of culture. The castles and manors in the countryside are the best example for this tradition; some dishes like Rødgrød (German: Rote Grütze, literal English "red grits" or "red groats") are also shared, as well as surnames such as Hansen.

The most important festivals are the Kiel Week, Schleswig-Holstein Musik Festival, an annual classic music festival all over the state, and the Lübeck Nordic Film Days, an annual film festival for movies from Scandinavian countries, held in Lübeck. The Kiel Week is an annual event, except for 2020 and 2021 due to the COVID19-Pandemic. It took place again in June 2022. The annual Wacken Open Air festival is considered to be the largest heavy metal rock festival in the world.

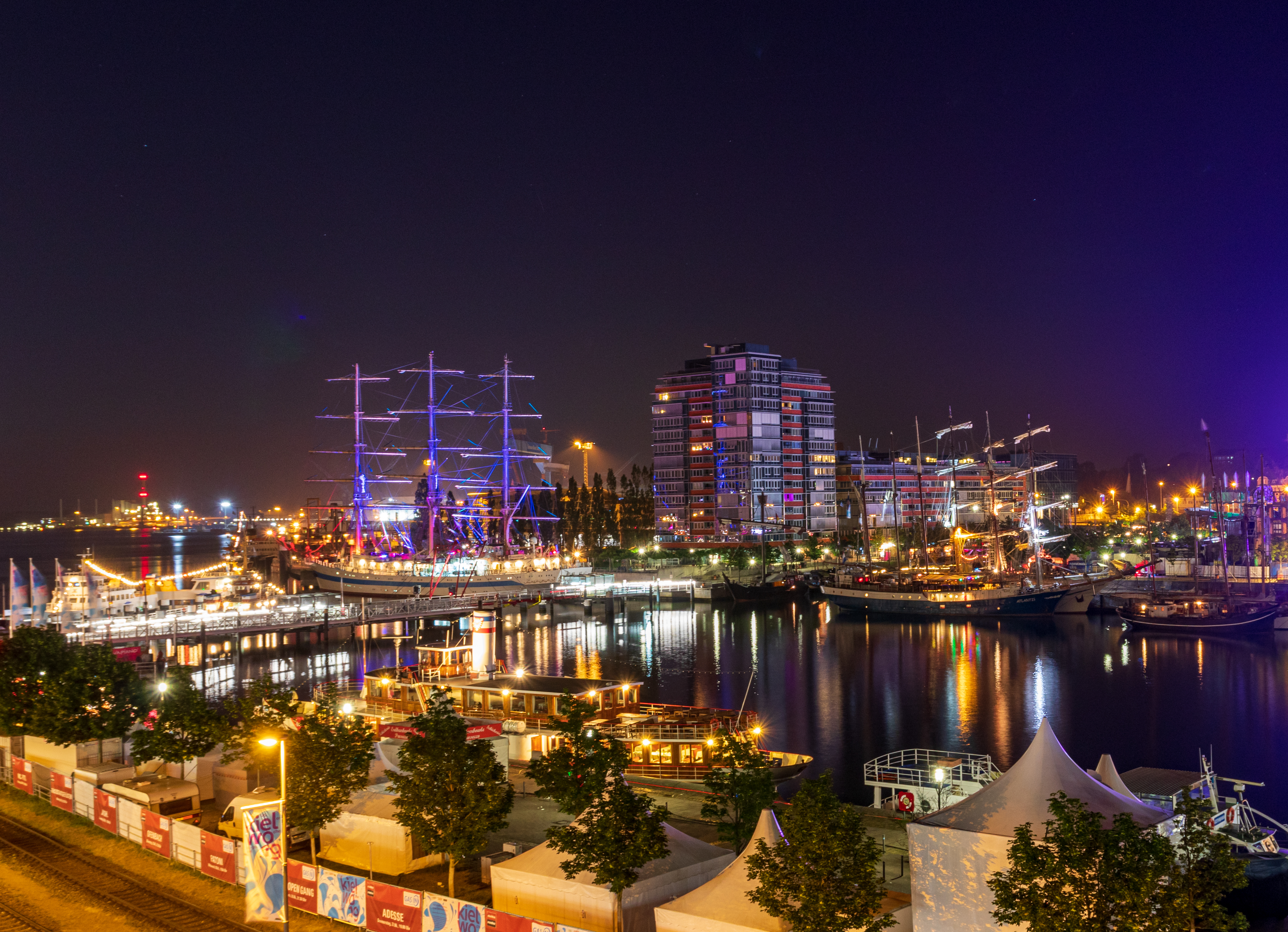
Kiel Week 2019

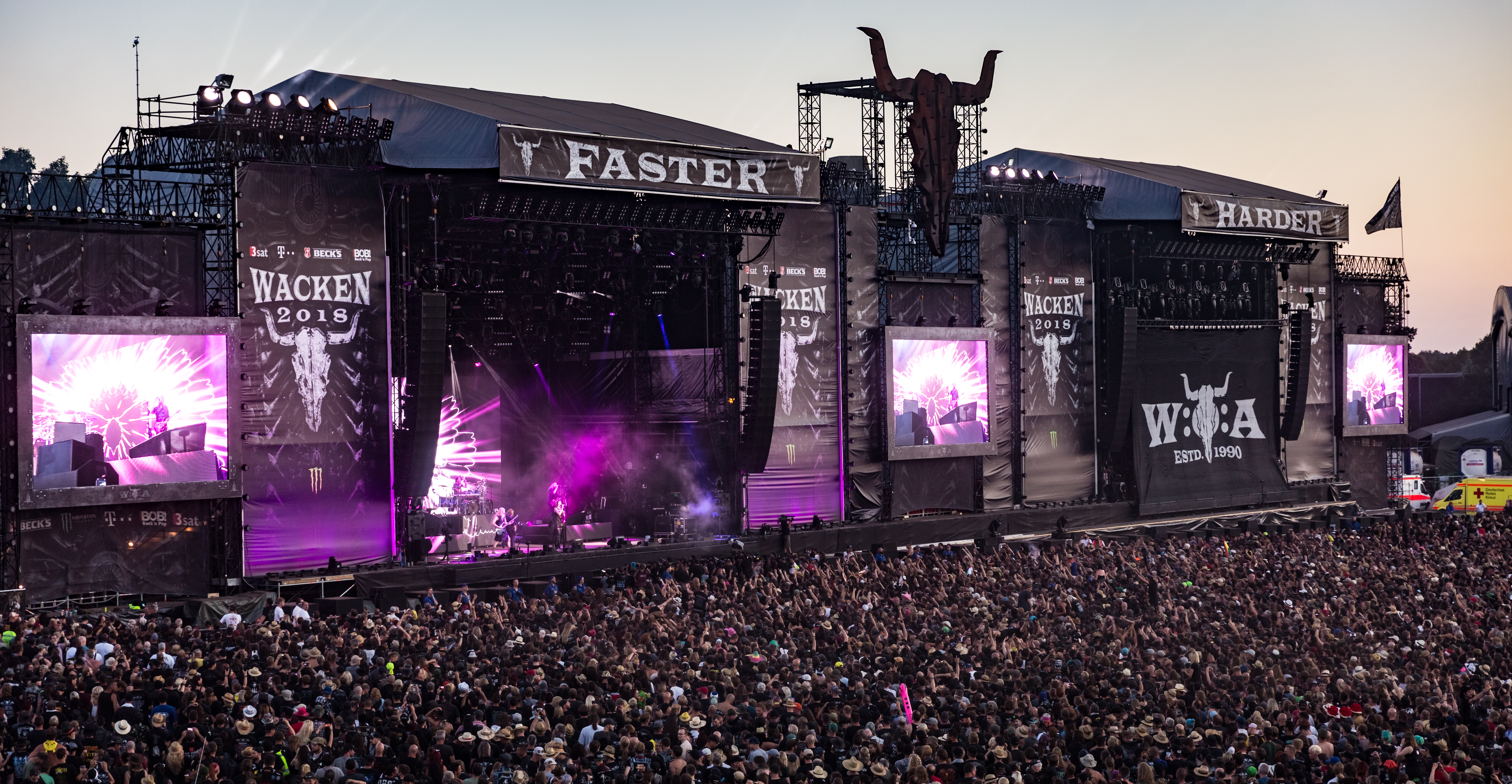
Wacken Open Air Festival

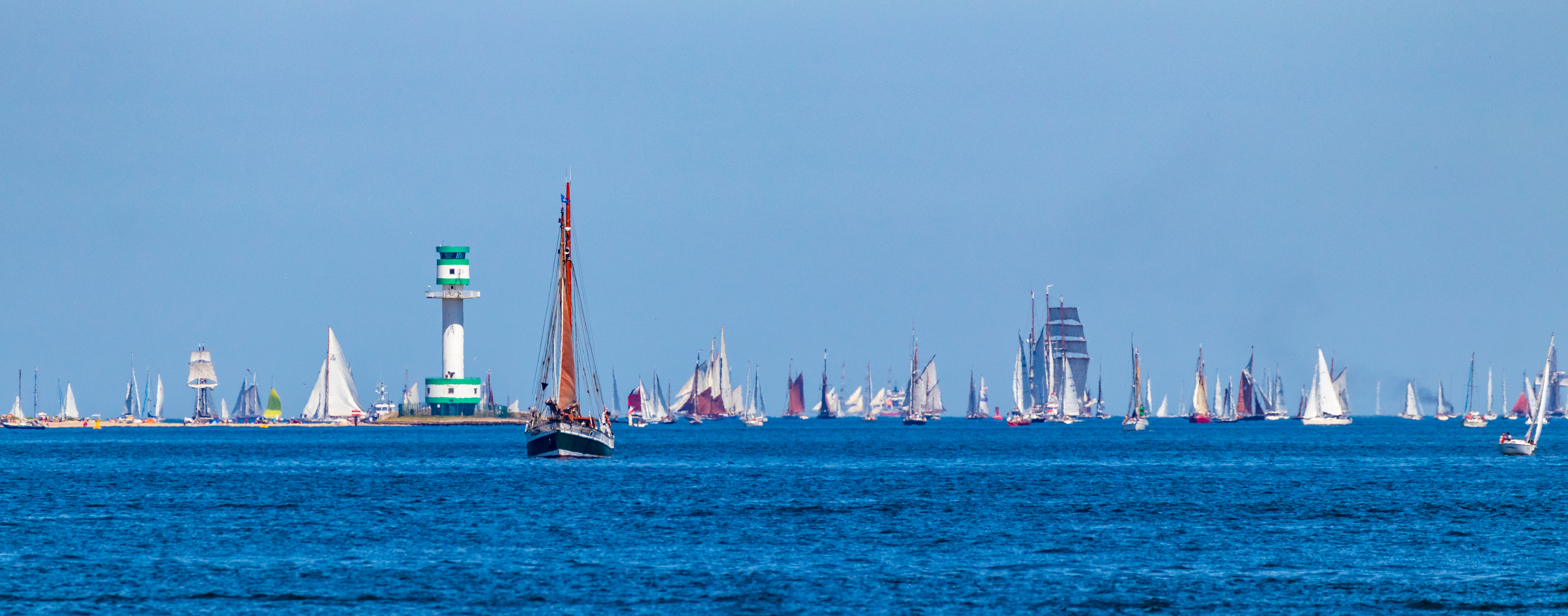
Kiel Week 2019

=== Symbols ===
The coat of arms shows the symbols of the two duchies united in Schleswig-Holstein, i.e., the two lions for Schleswig and the leaf of nettle for Holstein. Supposedly, Otto von Bismarck decreed that the two lions were to face the nettle because of the discomfort to their bottoms, which would have resulted if the lions faced away from it.

Government agencies of Schleswig-Holstein use a logo showing a stylized version of the Schleswig Lions and the Holstein nettle combined with the abbreviation of Schleswig-Holstein, "SH". Written either below or to the right of the lion and the nettle is "Schleswig-Holstein" below which either the Name of the agency using the logo is shown or the motto "Der echte Norden" (Germany's true North).

Schleswig-Holstein logo

The motto of Schleswig-Holstein is "Up ewich ungedeelt" (Middle Low German: "Forever undivided", modern High German: "Auf ewig ungeteilt"). It goes back to the Treaty of Ribe (Danish: Ribe Håndfæstning German: Handfeste von Ripen) in 1460. Ripen (Ribe) is a historical small town in Northern Schleswig, nowadays Denmark.

The anthem from 1844 is called "Wanke nicht, mein Vaterland" ("Don't falter, my fatherland"), but it is usually referred to with its first line "Schleswig-Holstein meerumschlungen" (i.e., "Schleswig-Holstein embraced by the seas") or "Schleswig-Holstein-Lied" (Schleswig-Holstein song). The old city of Lübeck is a UNESCO World Heritage Site.

=== Food and drink ===
The distinctive point of the cuisine is a combination of sweetness with a taste contrast, like sour or salty. These combinations are also described as "broken sweetness," which is especially present in sweet-sour dishes.

Typical dishes are:

- Birnen, Bohnen und Speck consist of pears, beans, savory, parsley, bacon and potatoes
- Holsteiner Sauerfleisch is sour aspic
- Holsteiner Katenschinken is ham with a traditional cold-smoking method
- Different uses of Nordseekrabben in soup, porrenpann, with toast or scrambled eggs
- Famous is smoked Kieler Sprotten
- Other fish also is popular: Flatfish or Herring
- Grünkohl. In Schleswig-Holstein, there is a real cult around this vegetable. In the autumn and winter months, groups of friends or colleagues go on a cabbage ride and choose their cabbage king, often combined with the typical regional sports of Boßeln and Klootschießen. The most popular dish is Grünkohl with Mettenden, but also other combinations like Grünkohl with Kassler and 'Schweinebacke'. The Dithmarsch marshland is particularly suitable for growing cabbage. The soils are fertile, so that a good yield can still be achieved even in bad years. Due to the constant sea wind, there are far fewer pests in the area.
- Lübecker Marzipan is a sweet made from ground almonds, sugar, and added flavorings
- Lakritz confection flavored with extract of the roots of the liquorice plant (sweet, salt, salmiak, and choco)
- Lübecker Rotspon, Bordeaux wine, which is delivered in oak barrels to Lübeck to be aged
- Flensburger Rum-Verschnitt, brown mix of imported rum, water, and neutral alcohol (typically 40–42%)

=== Languages ===
The official language of Schleswig-Holstein is German. In addition, Low German, Danish and North Frisian are recognized minority languages. Historically, Low German (in Holstein and Southern Schleswig), Danish (in Schleswig), and North Frisian (in Western Schleswig) were widely spoken in Schleswig-Holstein. During the language change in the 19th century some Danish and North Frisian dialects in Southern Schleswig were replaced by Standard German.

Low German is still used in many parts of the state. Missingsch, a Low German dialect with heavy High German (Standard German) influence, is commonly spoken informally throughout the state, while a mixed language Petuh (mixture of High German and Danish) is used in and around Flensburg. Danish is used by the Danish minority in Southern Schleswig, and North Frisian is spoken by the North Frisians of the North Sea Coast and the Northern Frisian Islands in Southern Schleswig. The North Frisian dialect called Heligolandic (Halunder) is spoken on the island of Heligoland.

As is the case throughout Germany, High German, introduced in the 16th century, has come to steadily replace local dialects for official purposes, and is today the predominant language of media, law, and legislature. It is spoken by virtually all inhabitants in formal situations. Since the end of World War II and the widespread adoption of TV, radio, and other mass media, it has gradually come to supplant local dialects in urban areas as well.

== Economy ==
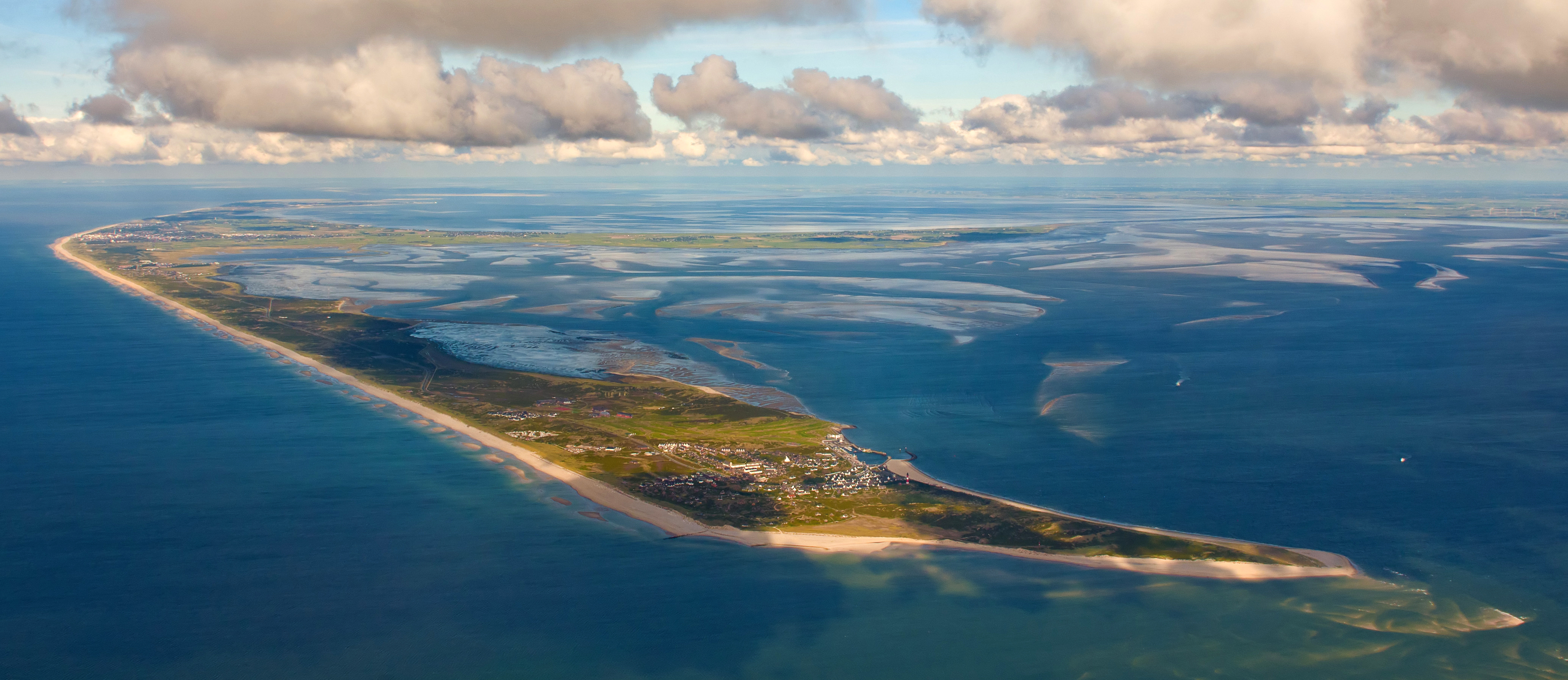
Schleswig-Holstein's islands, beaches, and cities are popular tourist attractions. Shown here is the Isle of Sylt.

The Gross domestic product (GDP) of the state was 62.7 billion euros in 2018, accounting for 1.9% of German economic output. GDP per capita adjusted for purchasing power was 30,400 euros or 101% of the EU27 average in the same year. The GDP per employee was 95% of the EU average. The GDP per capita was the lowest of all states in West Germany. In 2017, Schleswig-Holstein had an export surplus for the first time since 1989: export 22.6 billion euros/ import 20.8 billion euros.

=== Energy ===
Schleswig-Holstein is a leader in the country's growing renewable energy industry. In 2014, Schleswig-Holstein became the first German state to cover 100% of its electric power demand with renewable energy sources (chiefly wind 70%, solar 3.8%, and biomass 8.3%). By 2023, according to Schleswig-Holstein Netz, renewable energy sources were providing 204% of Schleswig-Holstein's electricity demand (the 104% surplus are exports).

The largest German oil field Mittelplate is located in the North Sea off the Dithmarsch coast and connected with a refinery in Hemmingstedt and chemical plants in Brunsbüttel via pipeline. It produces ca. 1.4 million tonnes of oil annually.

==== Nuclear power ====
There were three nuclear power plants in Schleswig-Holstein: Krümmel, Brunsbüttel, and Brokdorf. The last operating plant in Schleswig-Holstein, the Brokdorf-plant was shut down on new-years eve 2021. There is also a nuclear research center known "Helmholtz-Zentrum Geesthacht" (rebranded as Hereon) with 2 research reactors, located right next to the Krümmel plant.

During the 1990s, ten more cases of leukemia among children than were expected were identified in Elbmarsch, near the Krümmel plant. Anti-nuclear activists believed it was due to the nuclear plant, which led to several investigations. The reported discovery of small spherical beads of nuclear material in the area led to further concern, as well as the presence of minute amounts of plutonium in the Elbe. The origins of the nuclear material were disputed, with one report determining them not to be that of the Krümmel plant. Another report claimed that they may have come from an undisclosed fire in 1986, however, this theory has been questioned as it would have required a substantial government cover-up. The Chernobyl disaster has also been suggested as a source, though it is considered unlikely. The probable source of the material, especially in the Elbe, is nuclear reprocessing plants in France. A 2010 report exonerated the nuclear power plants on the Elbe as the cause of contamination. Further doubt was cast on the nature of the supposed beads of nuclear material, with a Federal commission chastising the original commission that claimed to have discovered the beads. The exact cause of the increased leukemia cases remains unknown, and could be due to other environmental factors, or even by chance.

The nuclear plants have further been questioned as a source of the cases due to comparison to the Savannah River Site in the United States. Despite the release of radiation at the Savannah River Site, there is no increase in cases of leukemia around it. Alternative hypotheses for the cause of the cases have included electromagnetic fields, parental radiation exposure before conception, other carcinogens, and benzene exposure; however, none have been supported by the existing evidence. Intriguingly, a larger case-control study in Lower Saxony found a correlation between the "untrained immune system" (as judged as contact with other children, vaccinations, etc.) and leukemia risk, suggested that an immature immune system that has not been challenged is at greater risk for developing malignancy, possibly secondary to an undetermined environment factor.

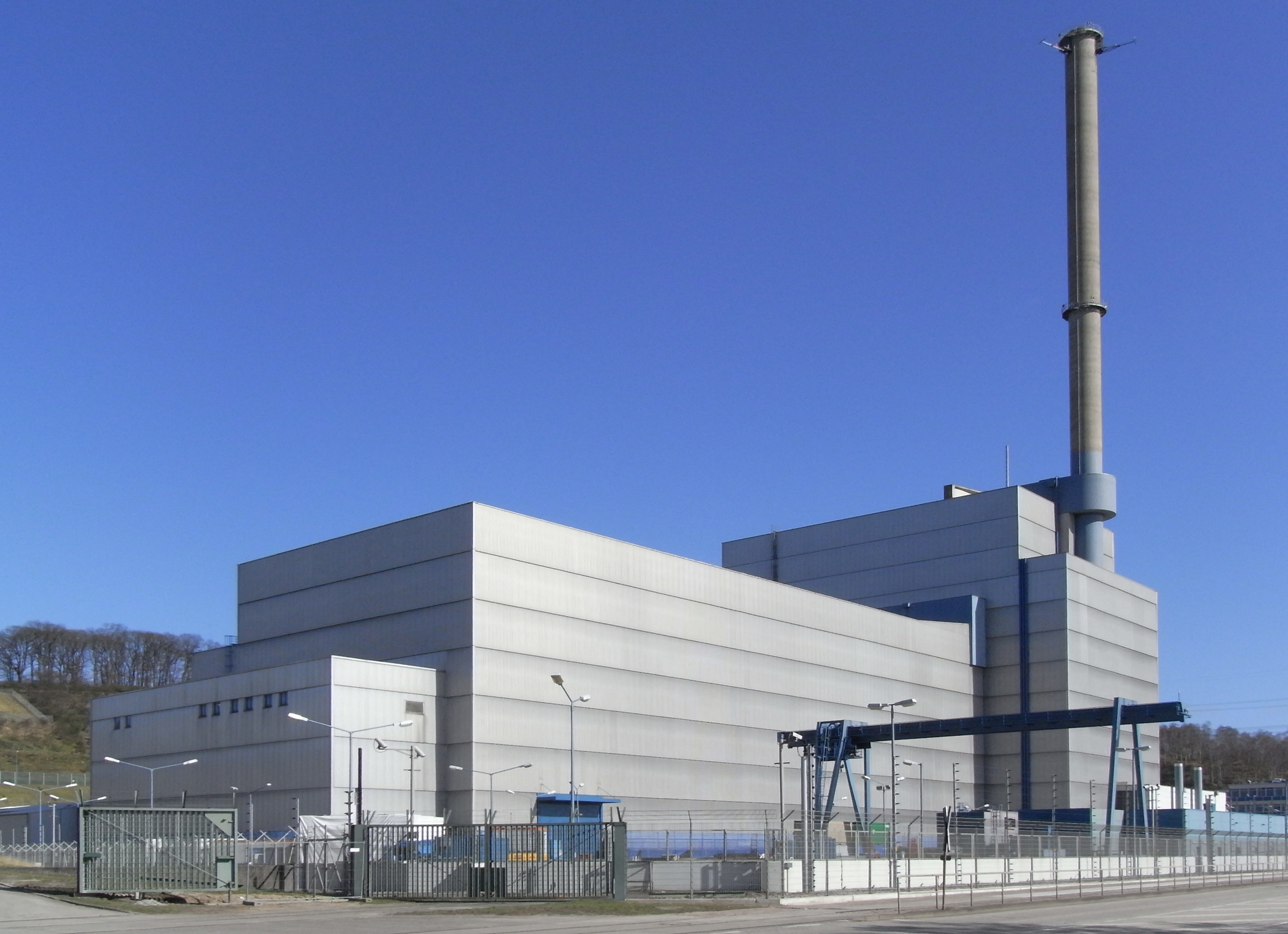
NPP Krümmel

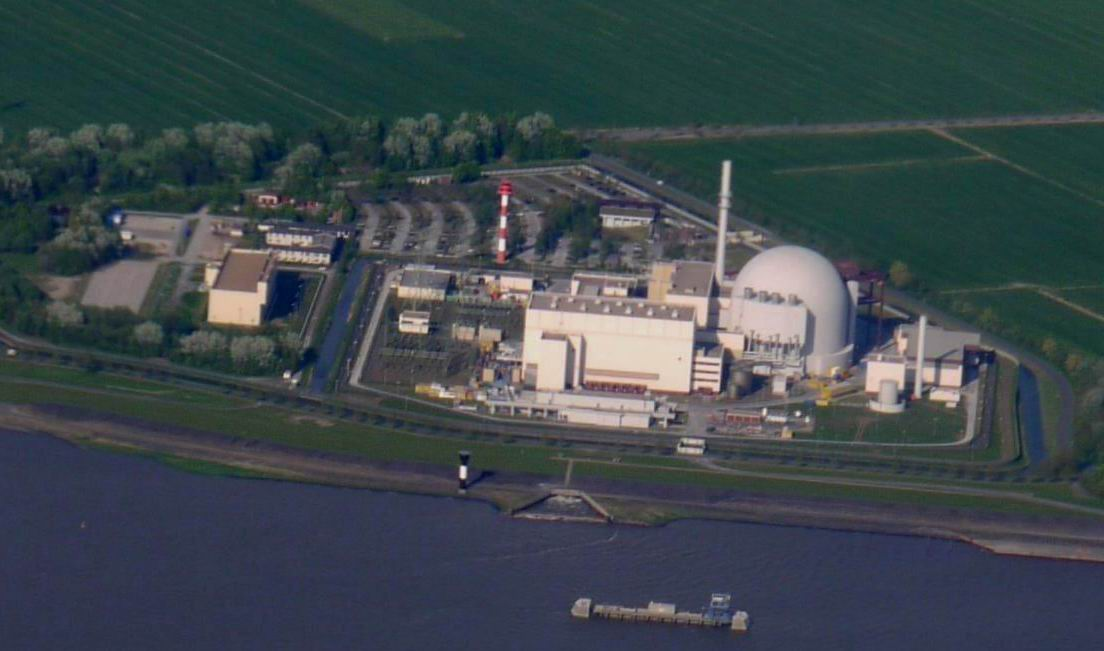
Brokdorf Nuclear Power Plant

=== Tourism ===
Located between the North Sea and the Baltic Sea, Schleswig-Holstein is also a popular tourist destination in Germany. Its islands, beaches, and cities attract millions of tourists every year. It has the second highest tourism intensity per local among the German states, after Mecklenburg-Vorpommern, but in absolute value it is rank 6th and only 1/3 of top destination Bavaria. According to a ruling by the Federal Administrative Court, everyone has the right to free access to the beach. Nevertheless, most of the seaside resorts kept cashing in (2-€3 /day/person).

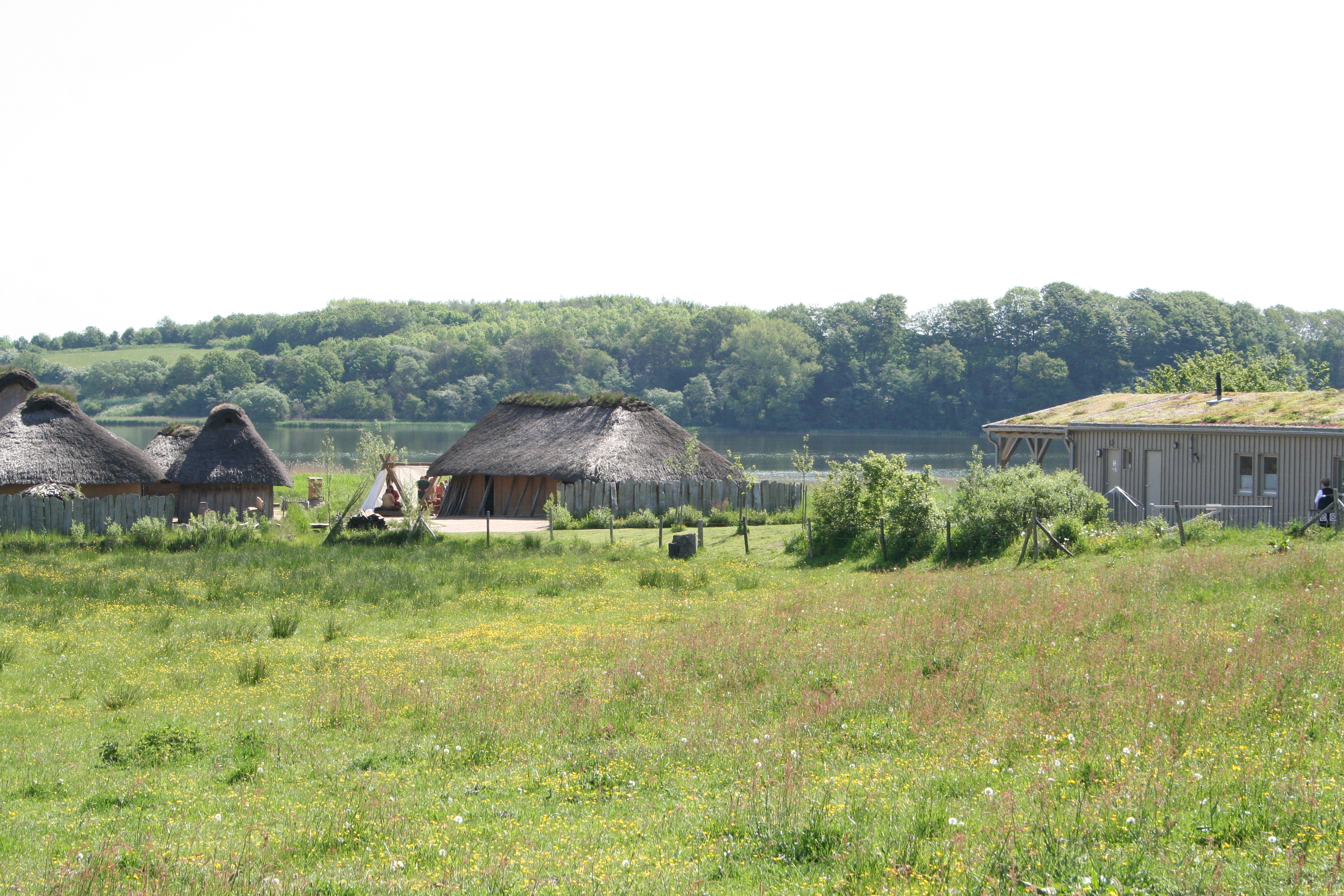
Haithabu Museum

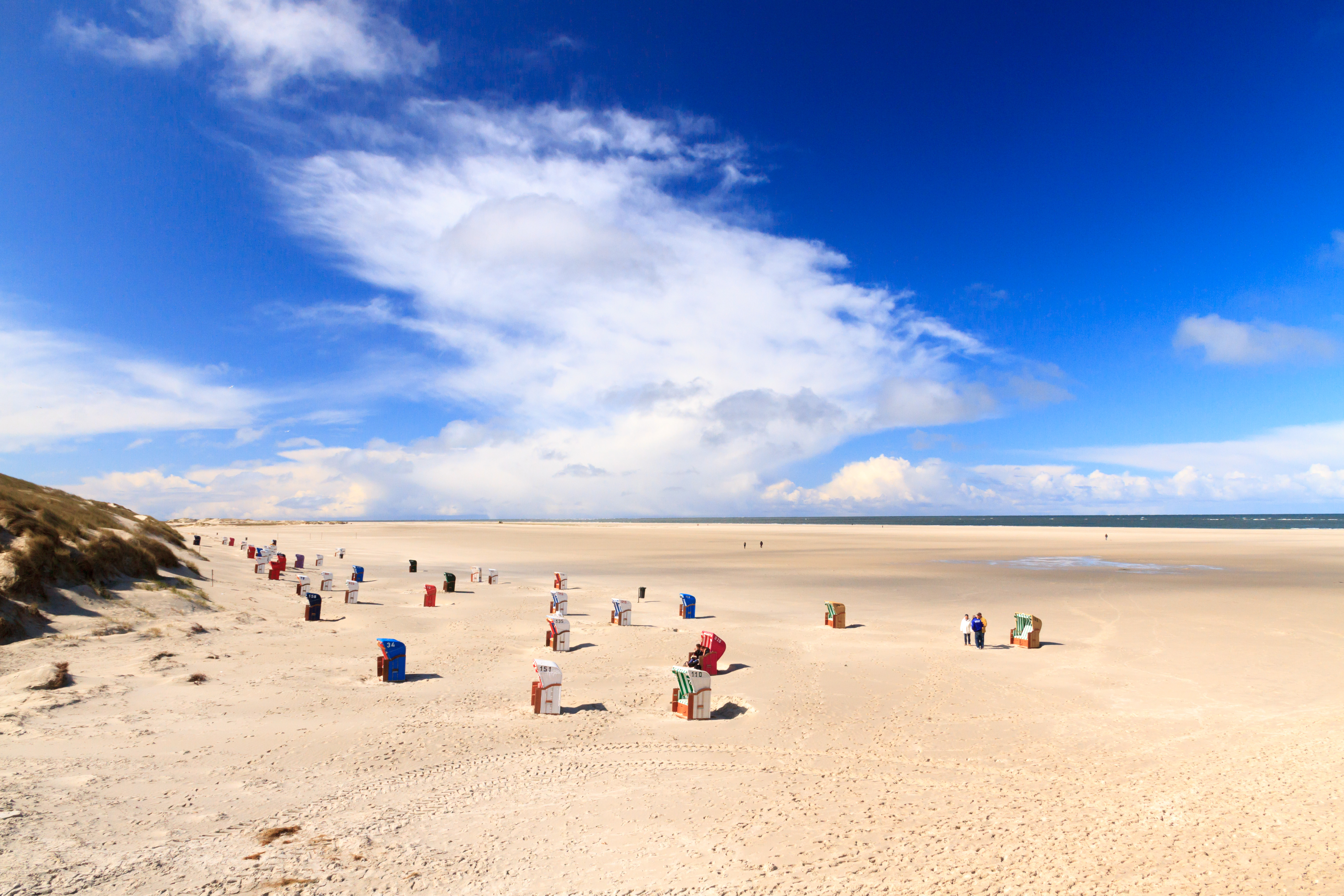
North Sea Coast at Amrum

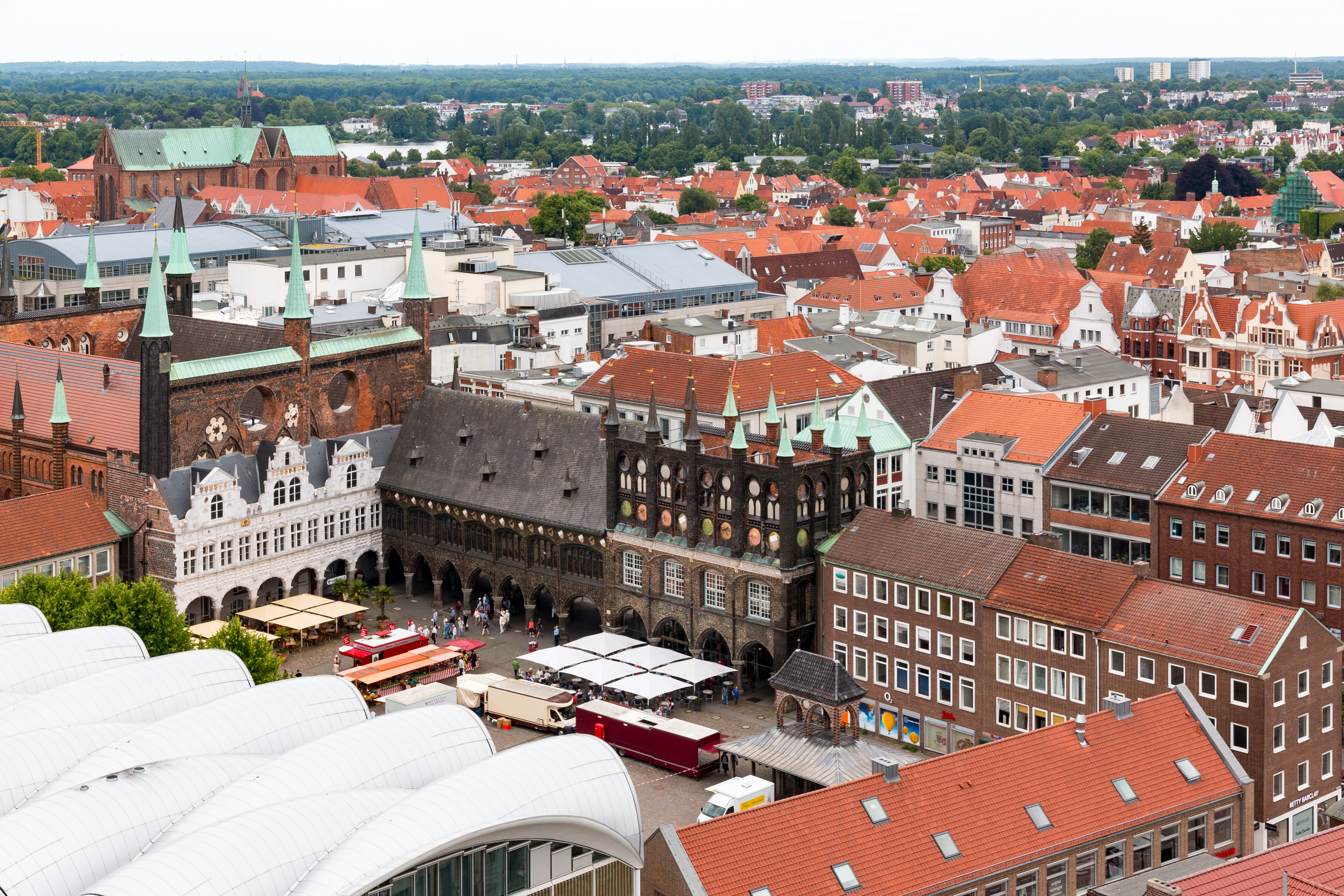
Lübeck City Hall

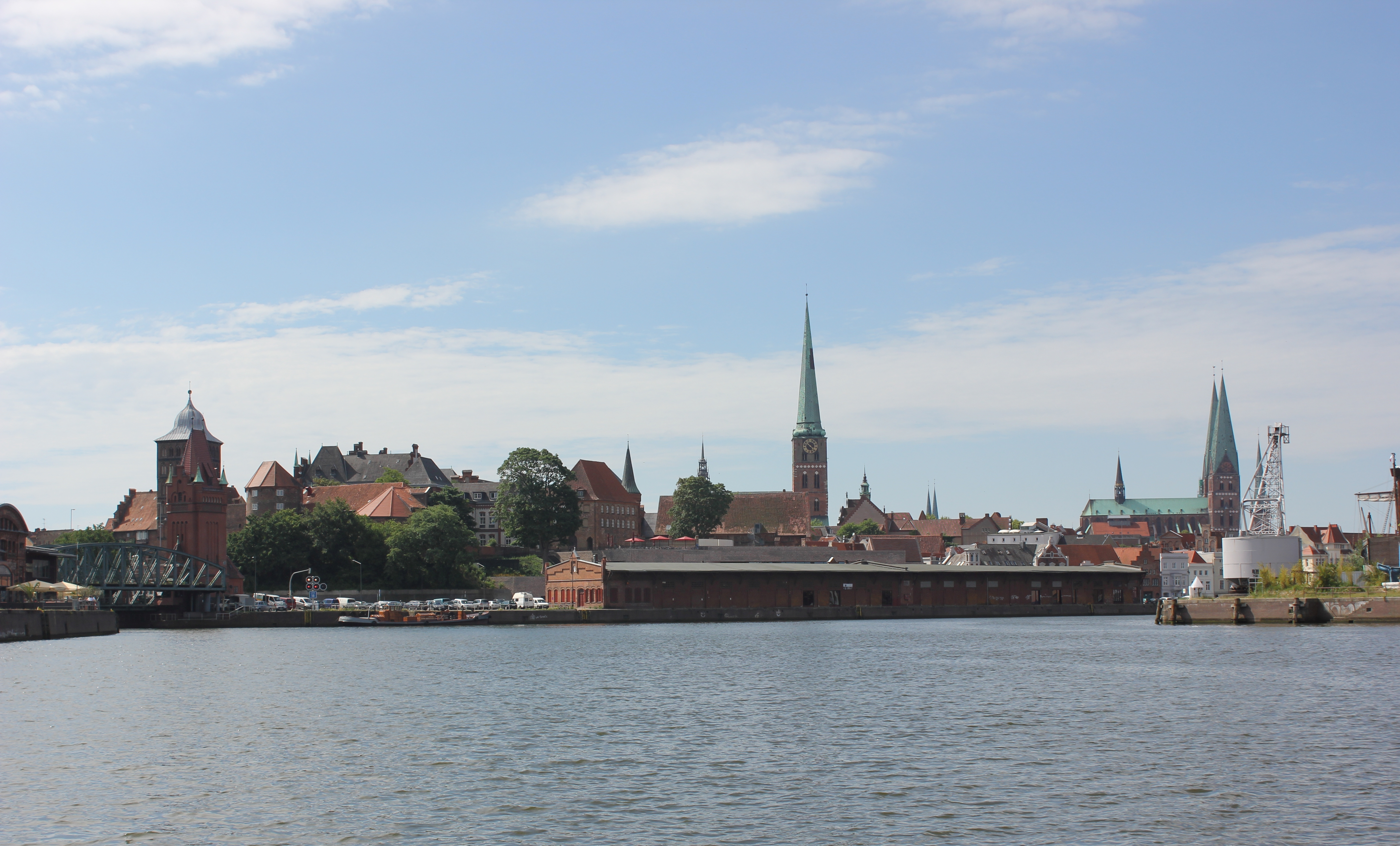
Historic City Center of Lübeck

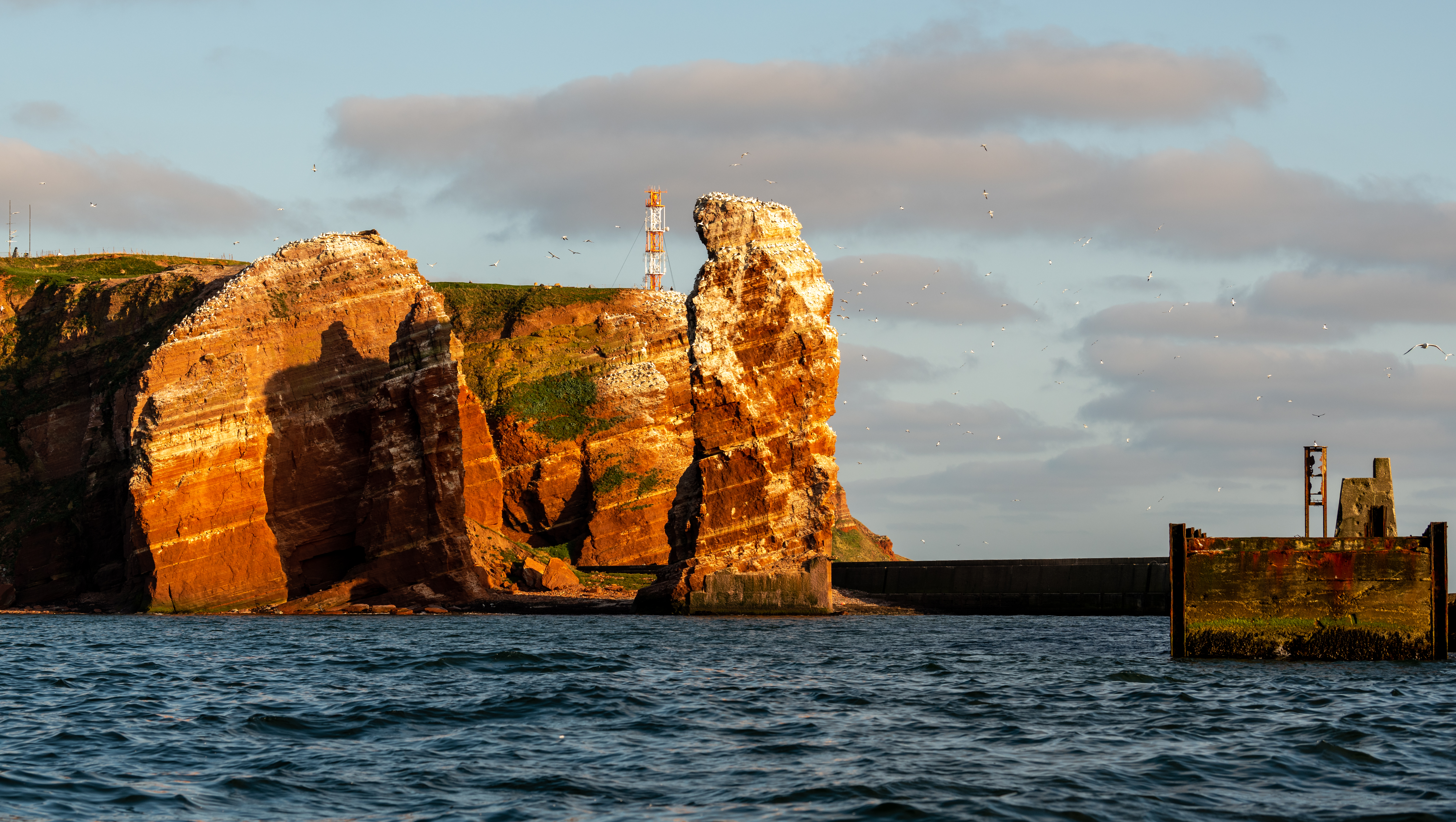
Island of Heligoland

=== Agriculture ===
63% of land in Schleswig-Holstein (990 403 ha) is used for agriculture (national average 47%).

Cultivated crops:

- Wheat, 208,000 ha
- Maize for silage, 176 000 ha
- Winter rapeseed, 112 000 ha
- Sugar beet, 7 500 ha
- Potatoes, 5,500 ha

There are some special cultivation regions:

- Elbmarschen, west of Hamburg for fruits cultivation
- Ditmarschen for cabbage
- Between Mölln and Lübeck for asparagus
- Pinneberg for tree nurseries and flower garden (especially, roses of Rosen Tantau and W. Kordes' Söhne), 2 931 ha. These 2 companies have over 50% of the world cut rose market. There is a German Nurseries Museum ("Deutsches Baumschulmuseum").
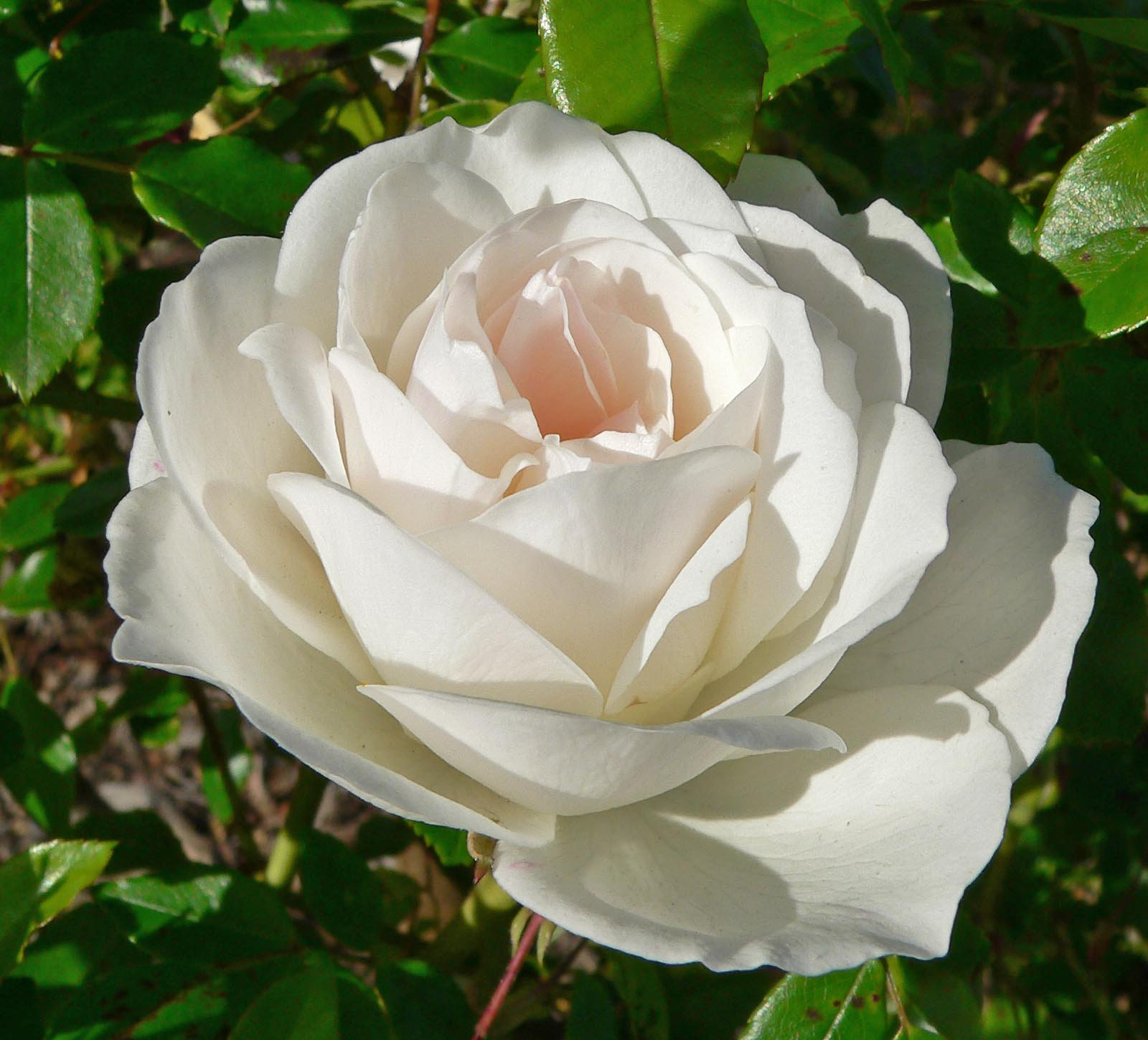
Rosa Iceberg ("World-favorite Rose", 1983) from W. Kordes' Söhne

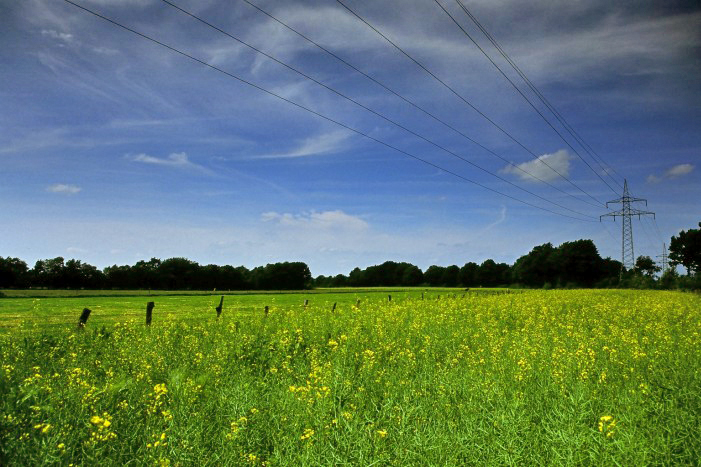
Rapeseed

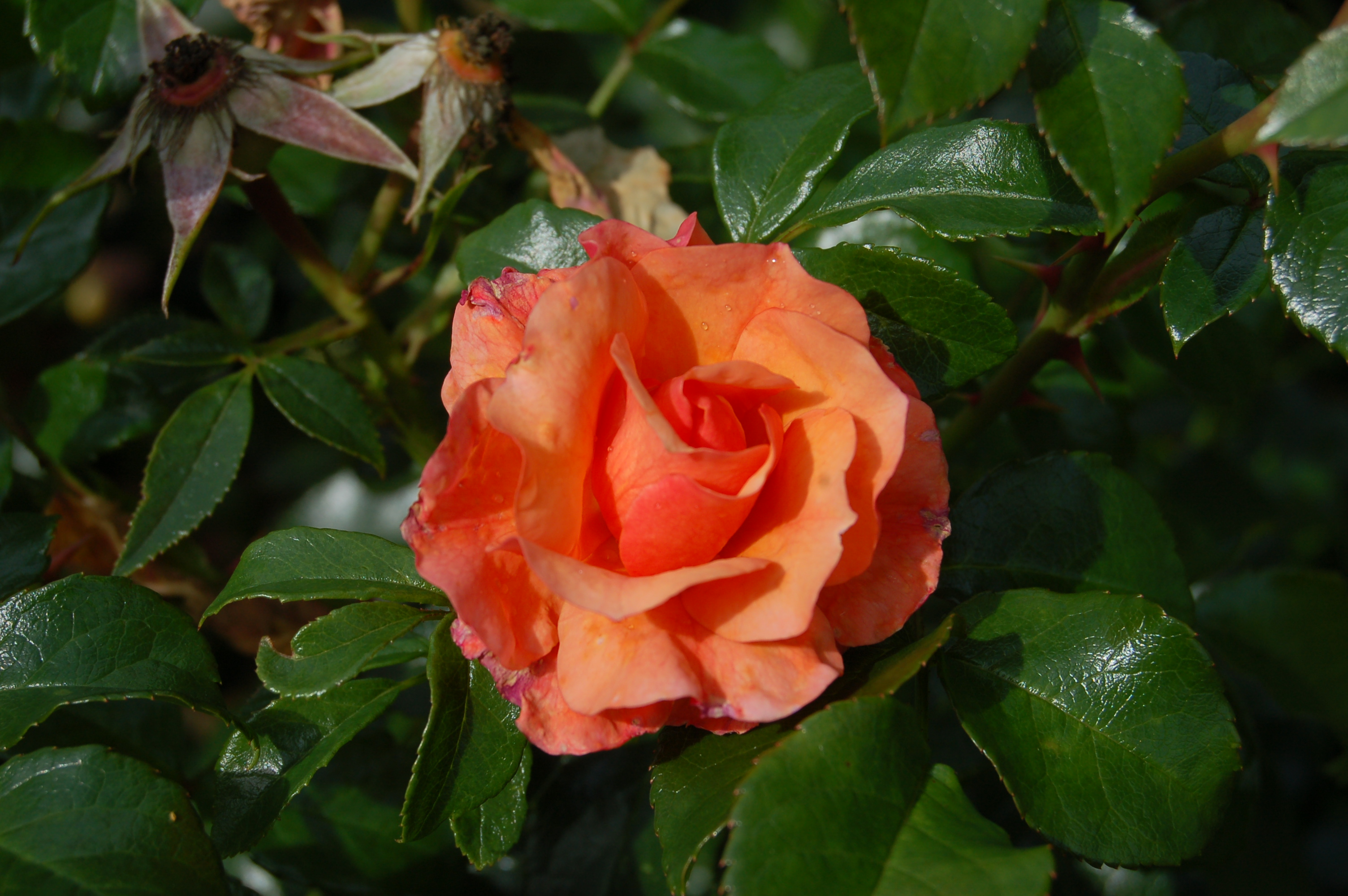
Rosa Apricola ("Goldenen Rose", 2005) from W. Kordes' Söhne

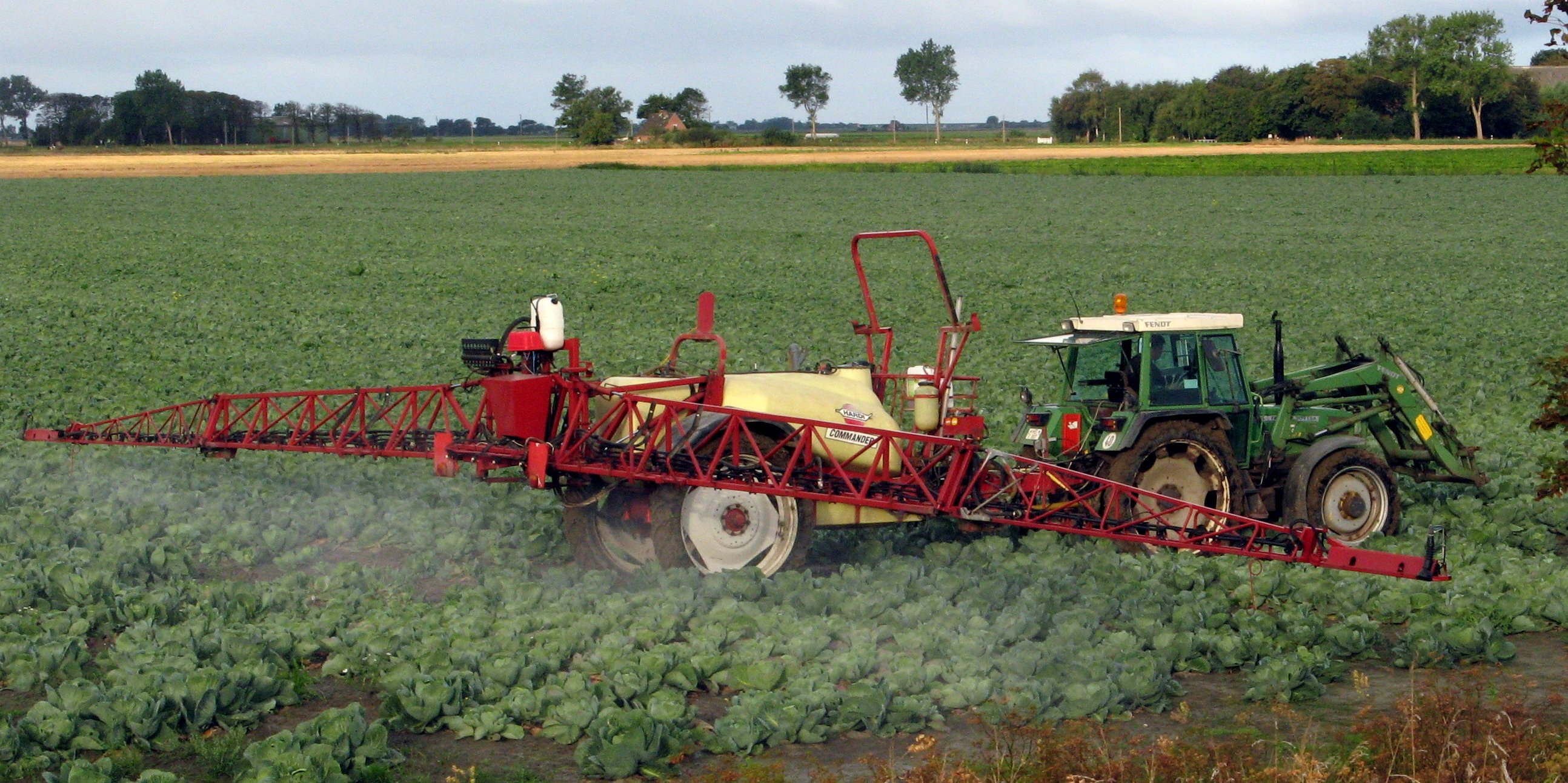
Cabbage Field

=== Animal husbandry ===
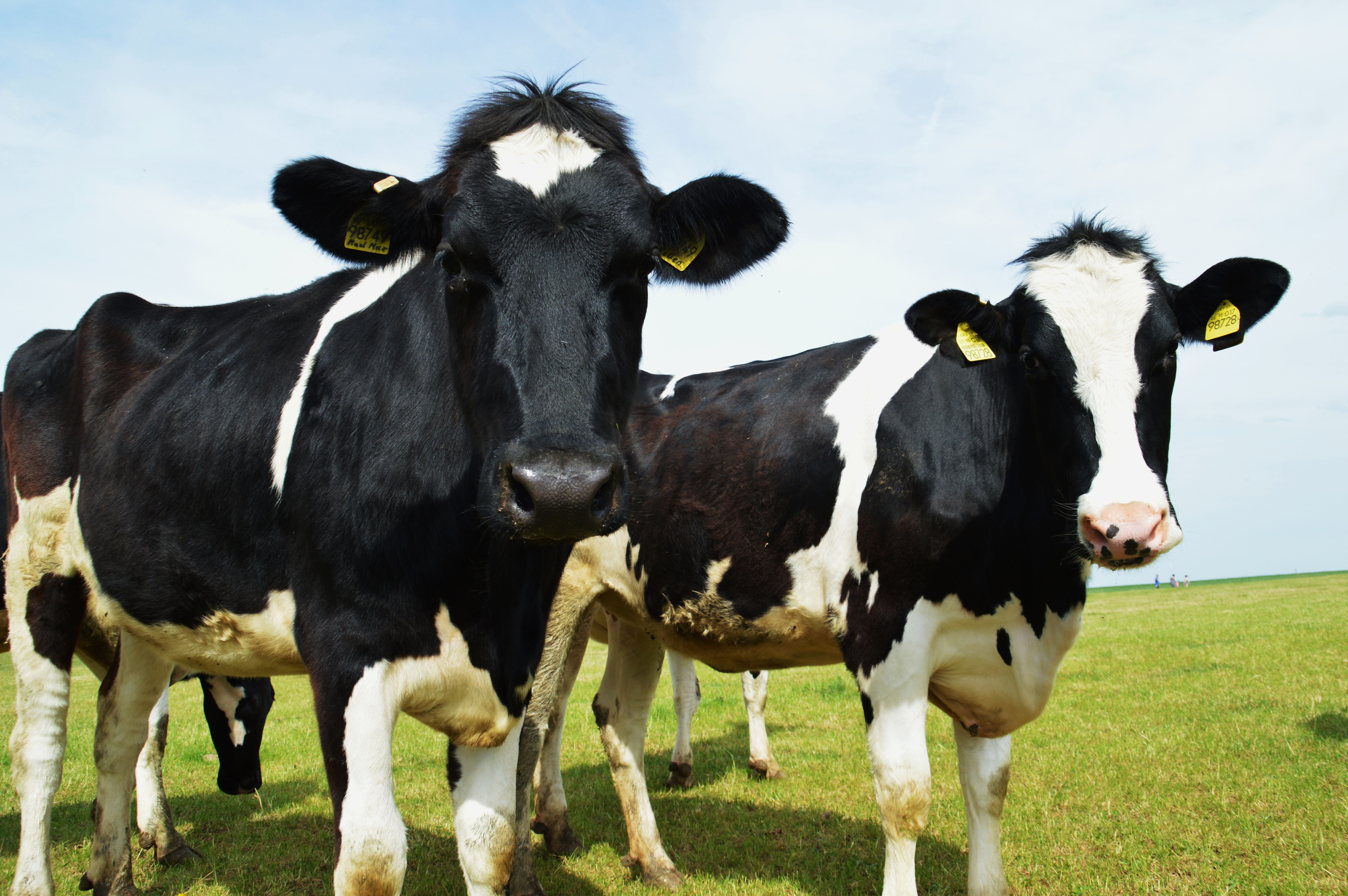
A Holstein heifer

The dairy and cattle farming in connection with fodder cultivation is mainly concentrated on the marshland and the bordering Geest areas. In 2020, around 1 million cattle, including 360,000 dairy cows, were counted in Schleswig-Holstein, ranking 4th among the German states. Livestock is continuously declining.

Schleswig-Holstein is home to the most productive dairy cattle: Holsteins, which produce an average of 8,125 L (2,146 US gal) per year of milk. It is now the main dairy cow around the world.

Pig breeding is mainly found in the Schleswig-Holstein Uplands. In principle, Schleswig-Holstein is one of the regions with relatively few pigs (a total of around 1.6 million; in comparison, Lower Saxony: over 8 million). Poultry and sheep are also of little importance in animal husbandry. Schleswig-Holstein had Europe's largest snake farm in Uetersen with over 600 venomous reptiles, but it closed in 2019.

=== Fishing and Aquaculture ===
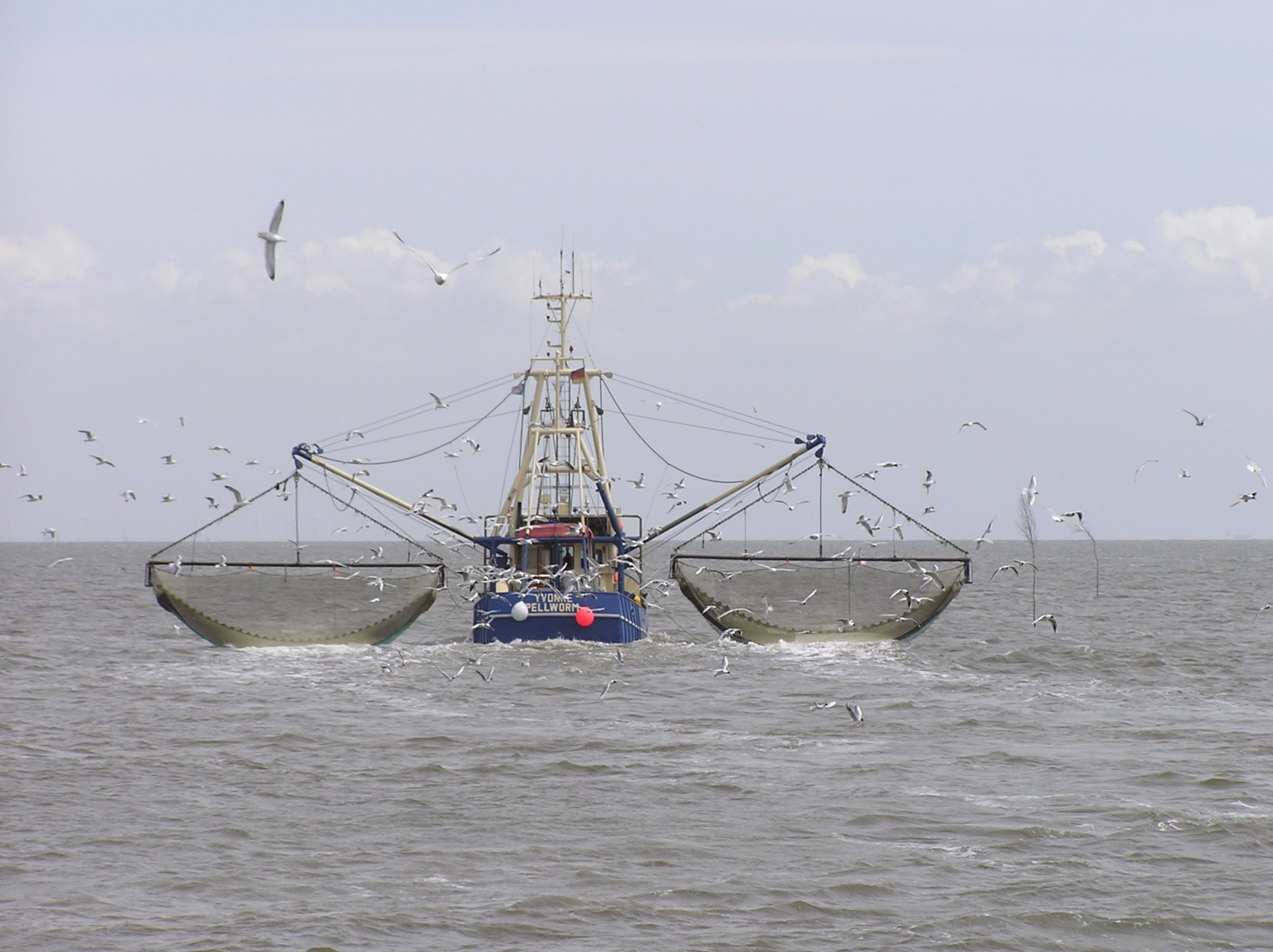
Shrimp cutter near Südfall

Total production from fishing in North and Baltic Seas was 40 780 tonnes in 2019, ca. 1/3 German production. In the Baltic Sea total production amounted to 10377 tonnes (2019), of which 5432 tonnes of sprat, 2568 tonnes of flatfish and 1190 tonnes of cod.

In the North Sea the numbers were 19,487 tonnes of mussels, 3560 tonnes of North Sea shrimp, 1166 tonnes of herring and 7062 other fishes. One important aquaculture product is mussels, 16864 tonnes. Inland fishing and aquaculture are not significant, with 221 and 250 tonnes in 2019, respectively.

=== Companies ===
The largest company headquarters in Schleswig-Holstein with annual sales over 1 billion euros are:

- Wholesaler Bartels-Langness, Kiel 5.3 billion €
- Conglomerate Possehl, Lübeck 3.8 billion €
- Medical equipment manufacturer Drägerwerke, Lübeck 3.4 billion €
- Telecommunication service provider Freenet, Büdelsdorf 2.9 billion €
- Oil refinery Heide, Hemmingstedt 2.4 billion €
- Submarine shipyards ThyssenKrupp Marine Systems, Kiel 1.8 billion €
- Drainage and water solutions ACO Group, Büdelsdorf 1 billion €

The unemployment rate stood at 5.0% in October 2021.

Year	2000	2001	2002	2003	2004	2005	2006	2007	2008	2009	2010	2011	2012	2013	2014	2015	2016	2017	2018	2019
Unemployment rate in %	8.5	8.4	8.7	9.7	9.8	11.6	10.0	8.4	7.6	7.8	7.5	7.2	6.9	6.9	6.8	6.5	6.3	6.0	5.5	5.1

=== Industries ===
- Shipbuilding. Ca. 20% of German shipbuilding. The biggest ship yard ThyssenKrupp Marine Systems situated in Kiel and build submarines of 212 and 214 types. In Flensburg FSG yard build ferries. Famous luxury megayachts are built by Lürssen-Kröger Werft, Schacht-Audorf, and Nobiskrug, Rendsburg. Shipyards in Lübeck and Caterpillar-MaK marine engine plant were closed. Raytheon Anschütz deliveries navigation equipment, autopilots, and radars to shipyards.
- Locomotive. Vossloh Locomotives (owned by Chinese CRRC) manufactures three models of diesel-hydraulic (G6, G12, G18) and two models of diesel-electric (DE12, DE18) locomotives. Other manufacturer was Voith Turbo Lokomotivtechnik, but closed in 2014 year. Both firms are in Kiel.

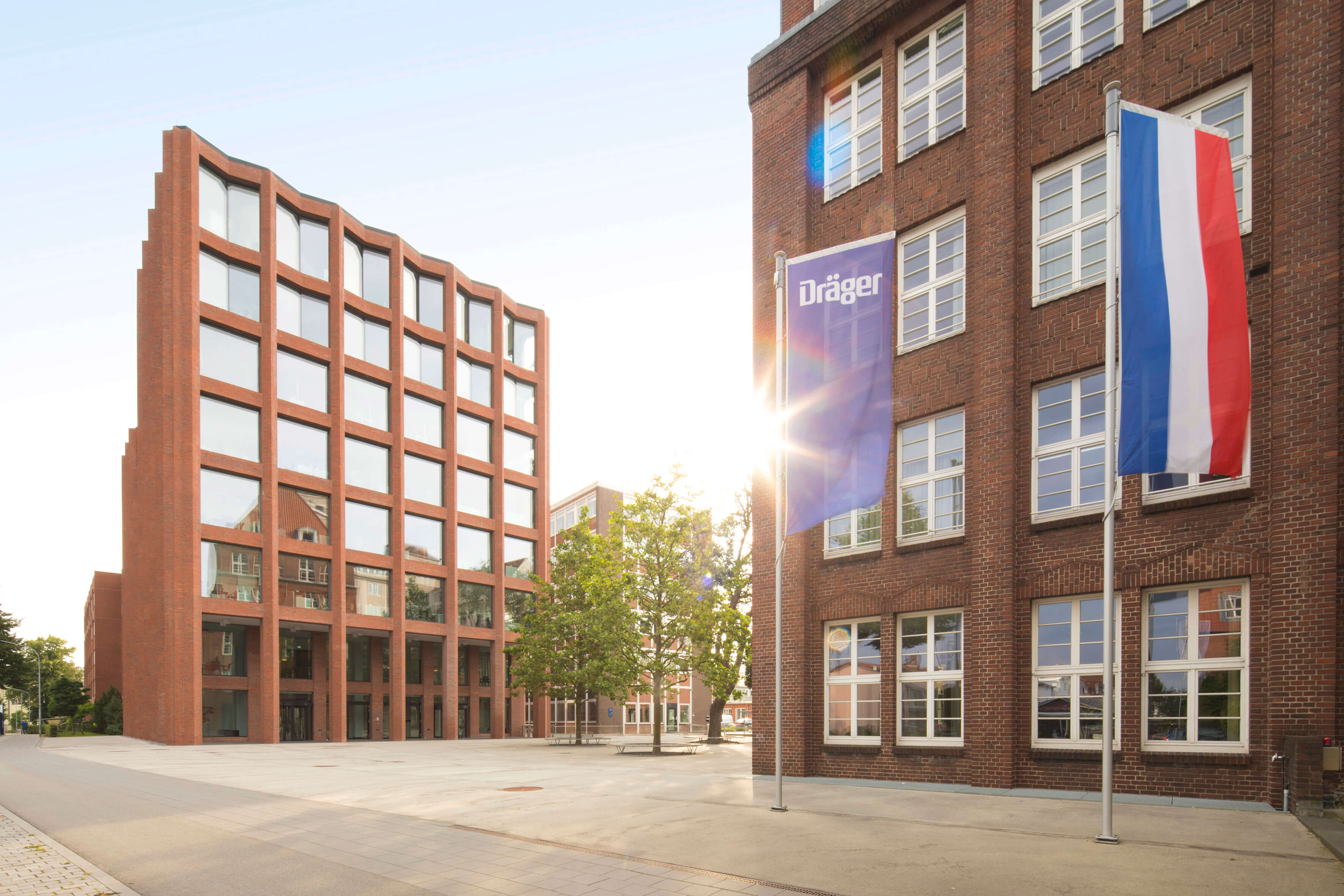
Headquarters of Dräger in Lübeck

- Industrial equipment. Fish and poultry processing machinery from Baader, Lübeck, bottle washers and pasteurizers from Krones, Flensburg, grinding machine tools from Peter Wolters, Rendsburg, machinery to manufacture human-made fibers, and non-woven textile from Oerlikon Neumag and Oerlikon Nonwoven, Neumünster.
- Medical and labor equipment. Drägerwerk in Lübeck manufactures breathing equipment, medical ventilators and monitors, anesthetic machines, neonatal incubators, gas detectors, drug testing equipment, diving equipment, rebreathers, and breathalyzers. The company delivers breathing devices for reanimation COVID-19 patients. Euroimmun, Lübeck, produces test systems with which antibodies can be determined in the serum of patients and thus autoimmune and infectious diseases (including COVID-19) as well as allergies.
- Chemical. Almost all chemical industry is concentrated around Brunsbüttel. Covestro, with 650 employees, produced annually 400,000 tonnes methylene diphenyl diisocyanate, which using in synthesis of polyurethane. Yara (214 employees) produces nitrogen fertilizers, but, with a special process, instead of using natural gas, it uses heavy oil, which also allows the manufacture of byproduct vanadium oxide and sulphur. Heavy oil is a source material to produce bitumen by Total Bitumen (130 empl.). Other plant is Sasol (520 empl.), which produce fatty and Guerbet alcohols, paraffin and high-purity aluminium oxide, aluminium hydroxide and triethylaluminium. Another important location of the chemical industry is Neumünster with EMS-Griltech, which manufactures technical fibers from polyamides and polyesters, adhesives, and powder coatings.

== Transport ==
=== Kiel Canal ===
The most important transport way in Schleswig-Holstein is Kiel Canal, which connect Brunsbüttel on North Sea with Kiel on Baltic Sea. Total cargo of ships reach peaks in 2007 and 2012, after that it continuous decline with 73.8 million tonnes in 2020.

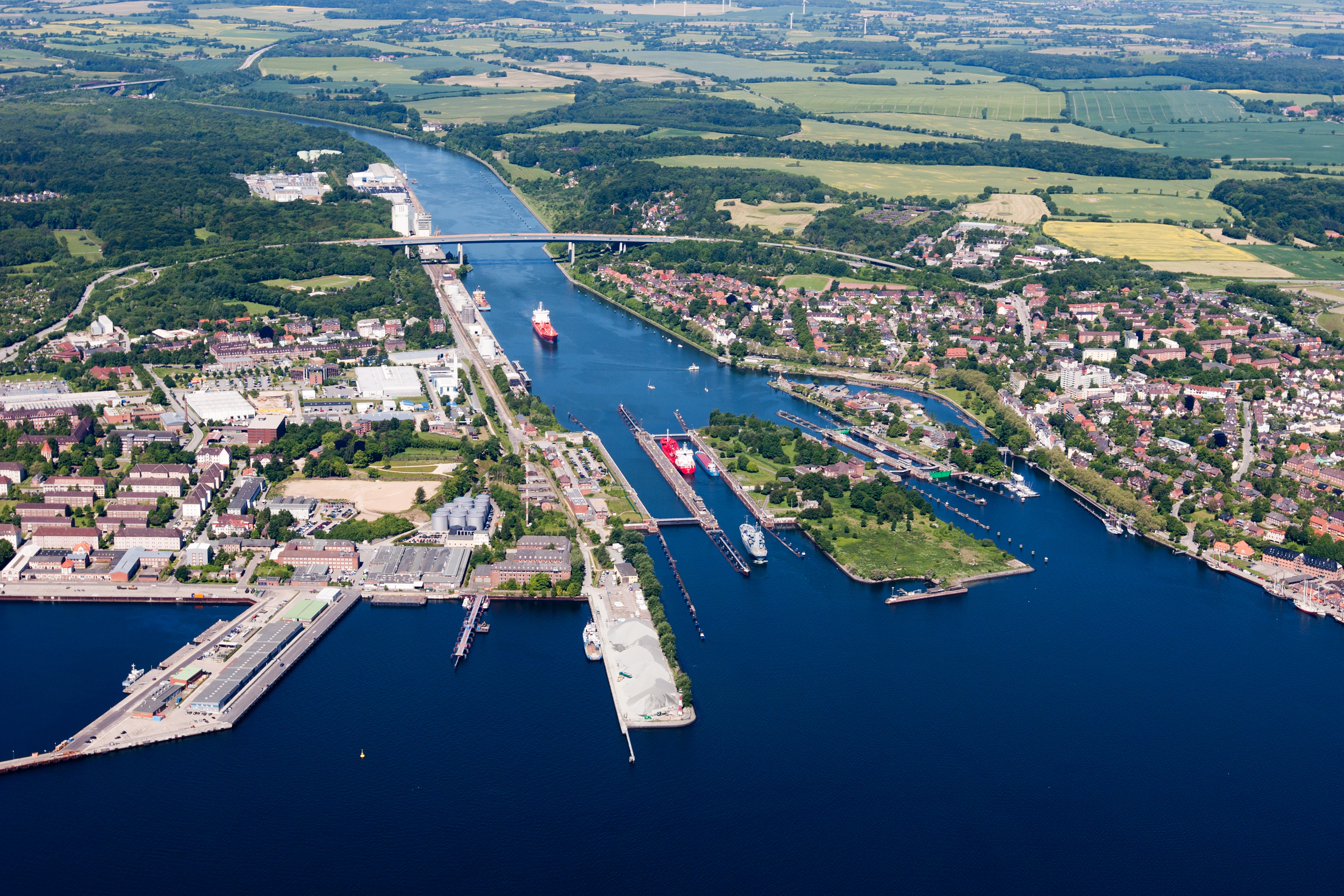
Kiel-Canal as seen from the Baltic Sea

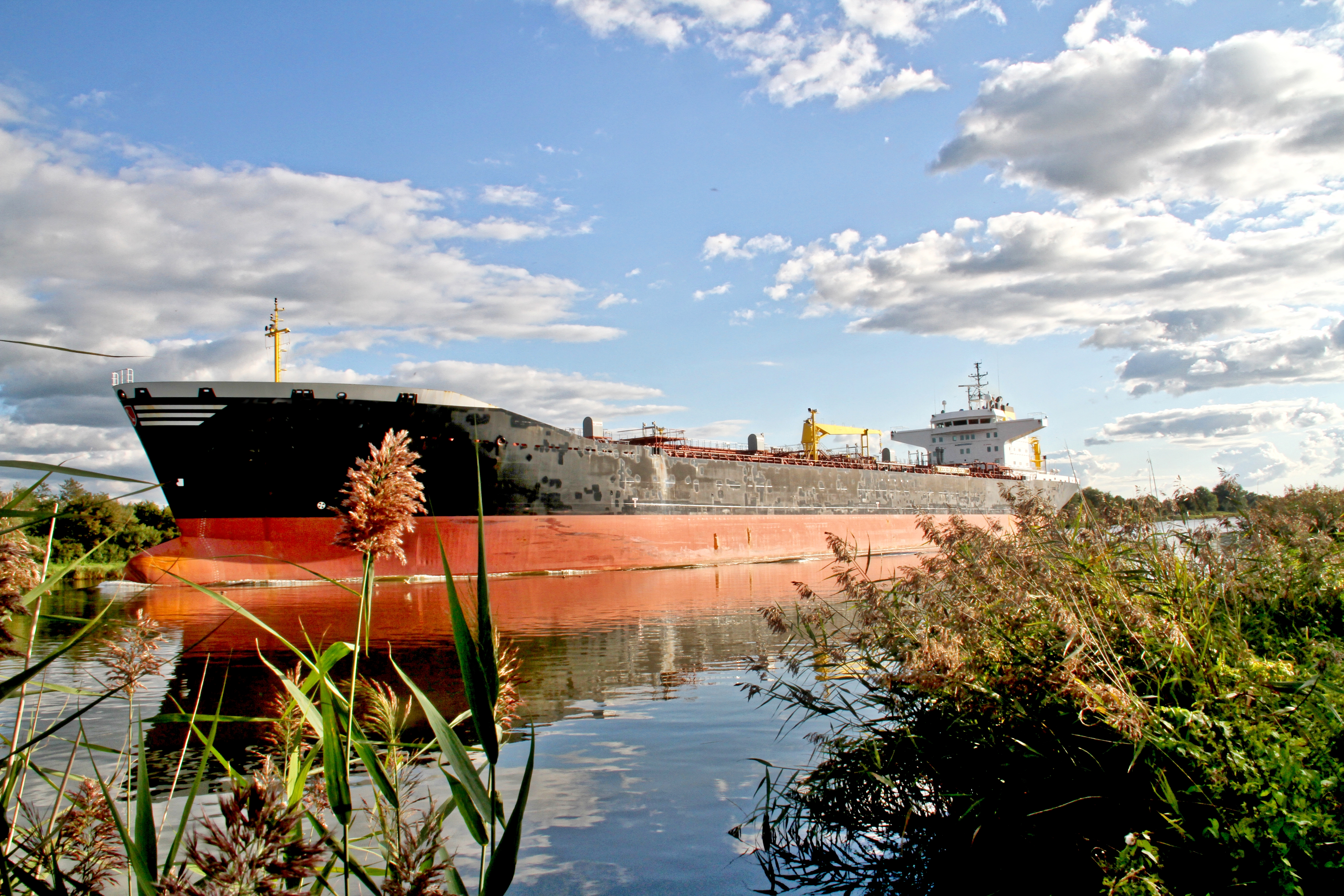
A freighter in Transit through the Kiel Canal

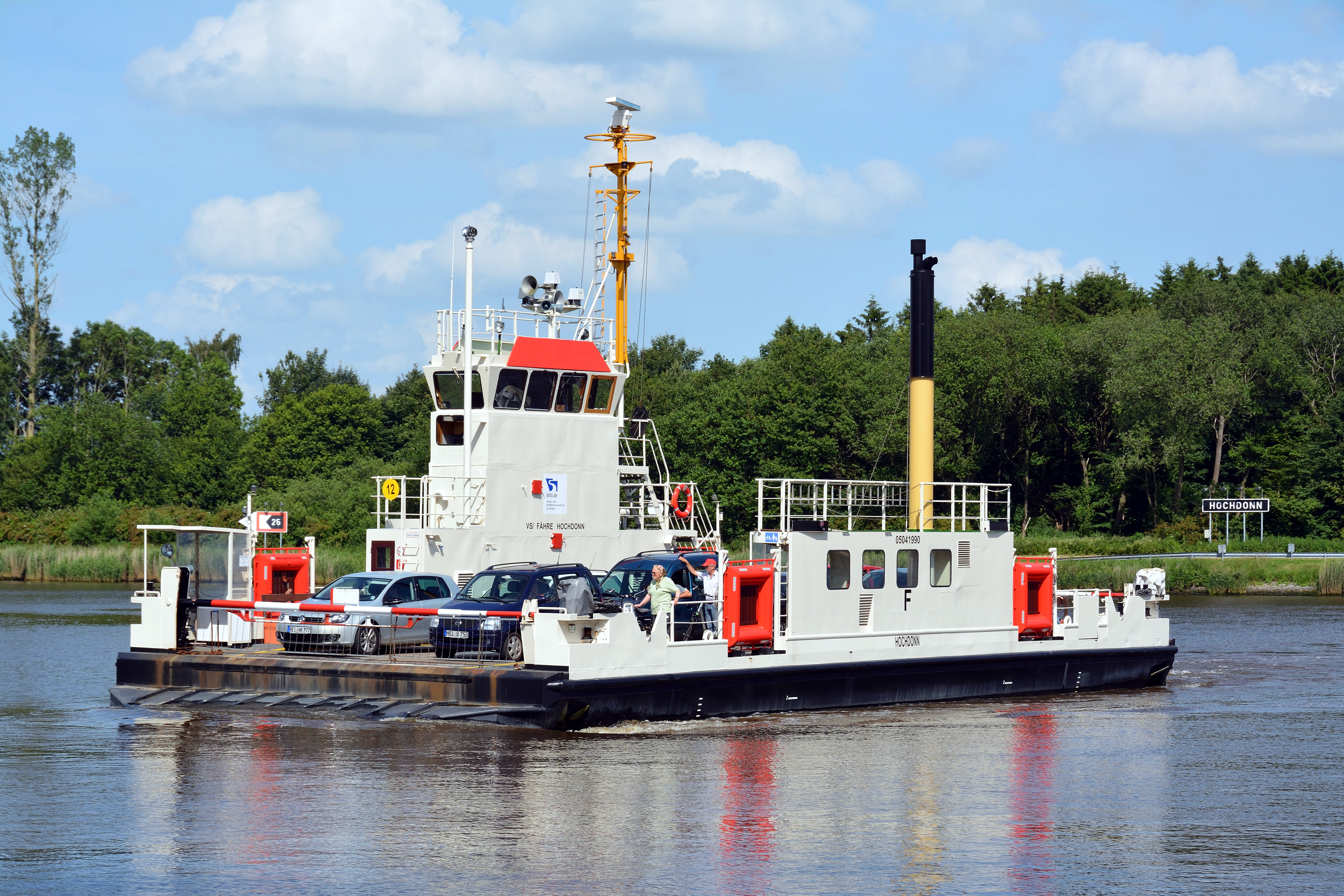
Ferry Hochdonn

=== Ports ===
The state has 46 public ports and landing stages, four of which fulfill international transit functions: Kiel, Lübeck / Travemünde and Puttgarden on the Baltic Sea, Brunsbüttel on the North Sea. Kiel and Lübeck are also important for freight traffic to Scandinavia and Eastern Europe. Lübeck-Travemünde and Kiel are also important ferry and cruise ports. Puttgarden is the German port of the Vogelfluglinie to Denmark. Brunsbüttel is a significant port for bulk goods and also serves as a foundation for the offshore wind energy industry.

Port	HANDLING OF GOODS, MT	FERRY AND RO/RO TRANSPORT, MT	NUMBER OF PASSENGERS
Lübeck	16.0	23.0	449 000
Brunsbüttel	10.1	0.0	0
Puttgarden	5.4	14.4	5 482 277
Kiel	4.8	5.9	1 588 467

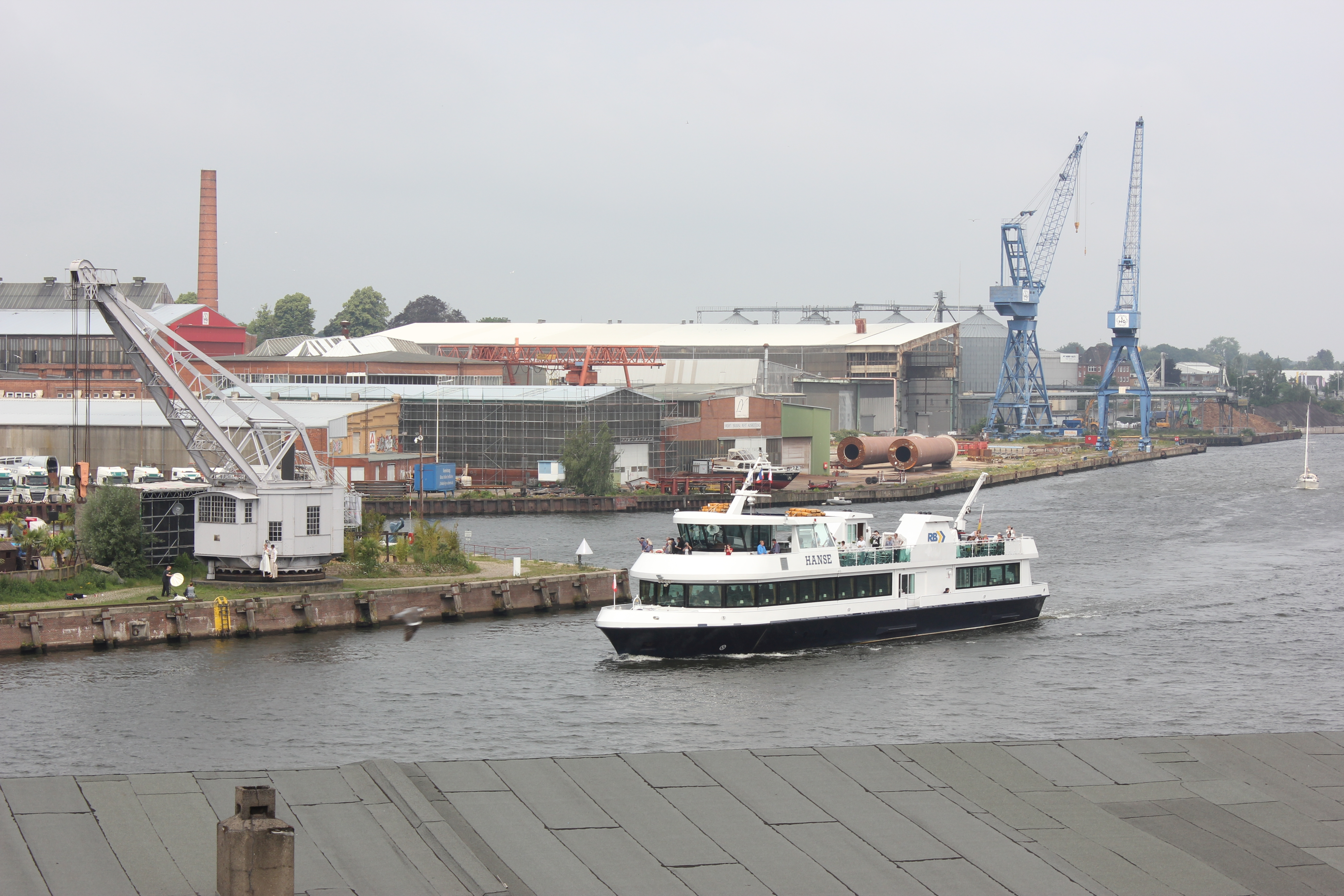
Port of Lübeck

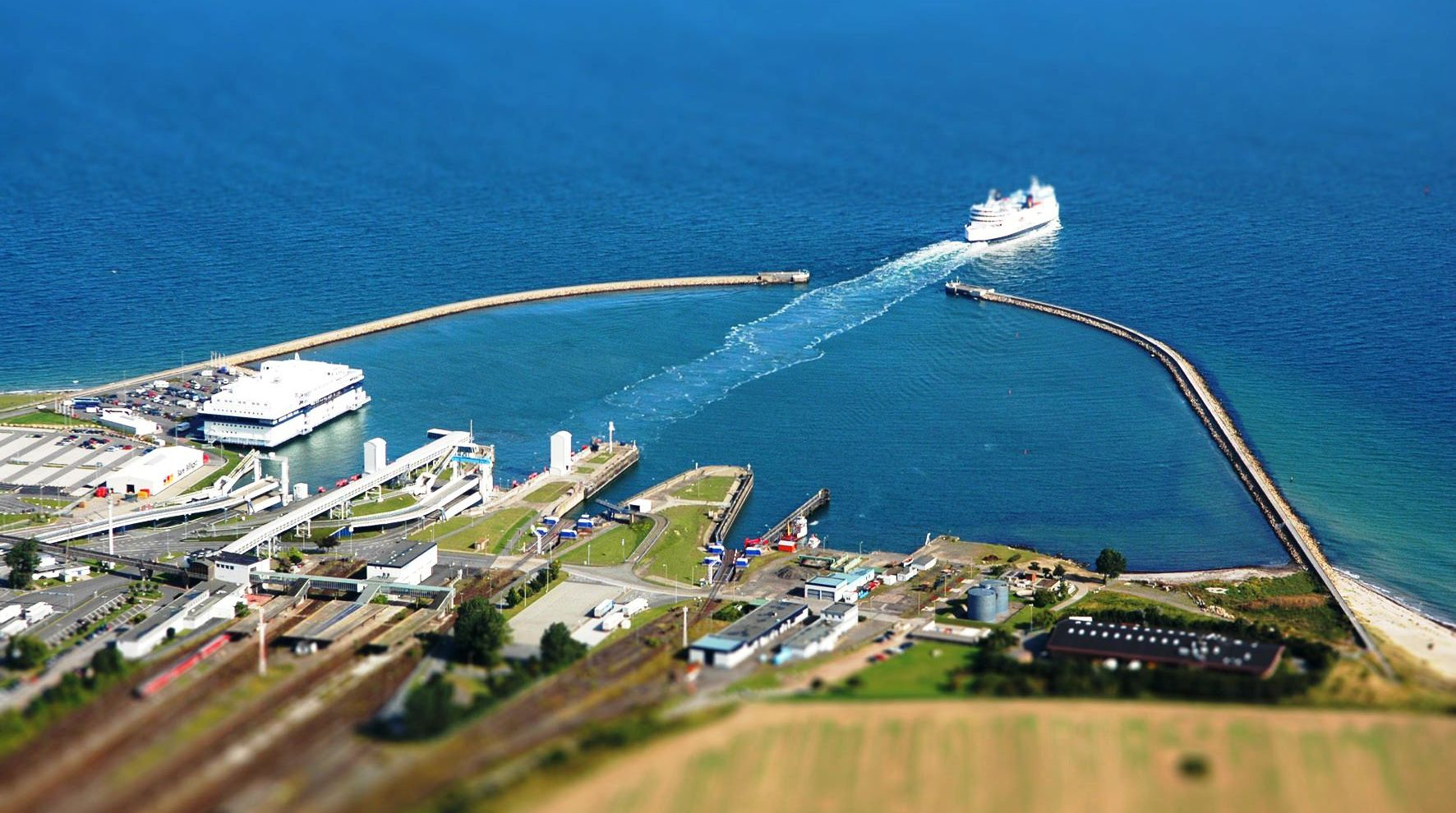
Port of Puttgarden

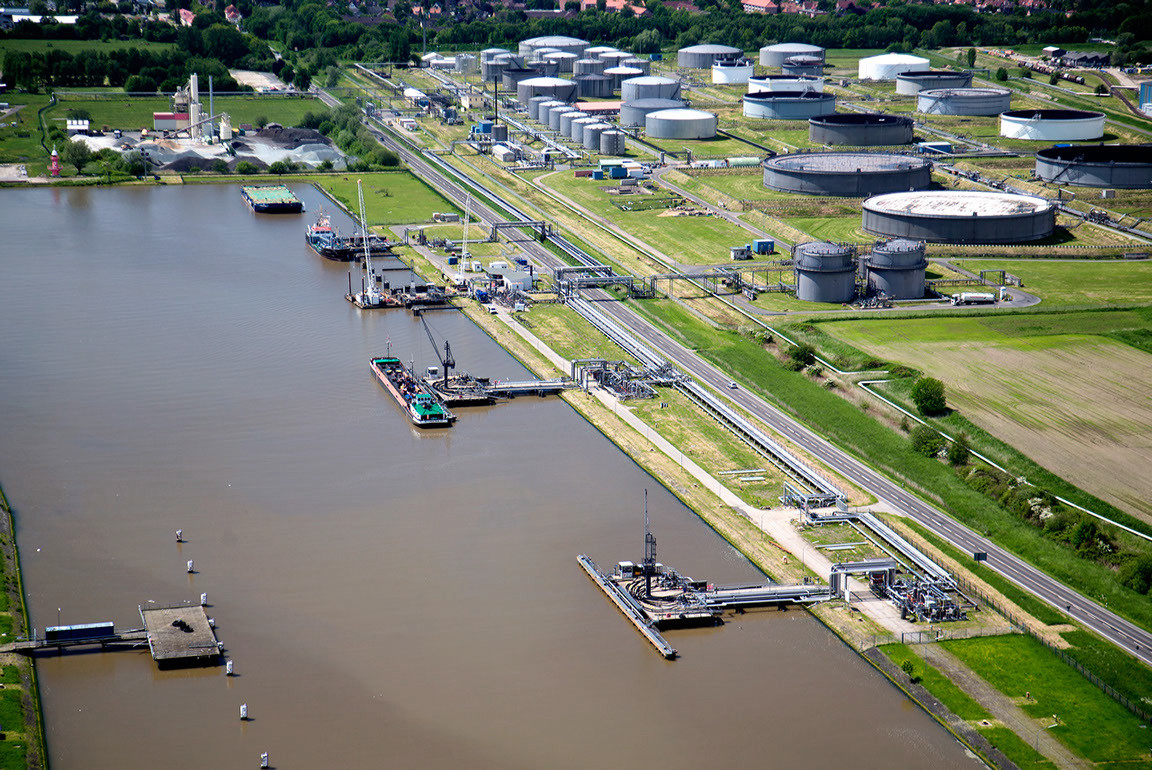
Port of Brunsbüttel

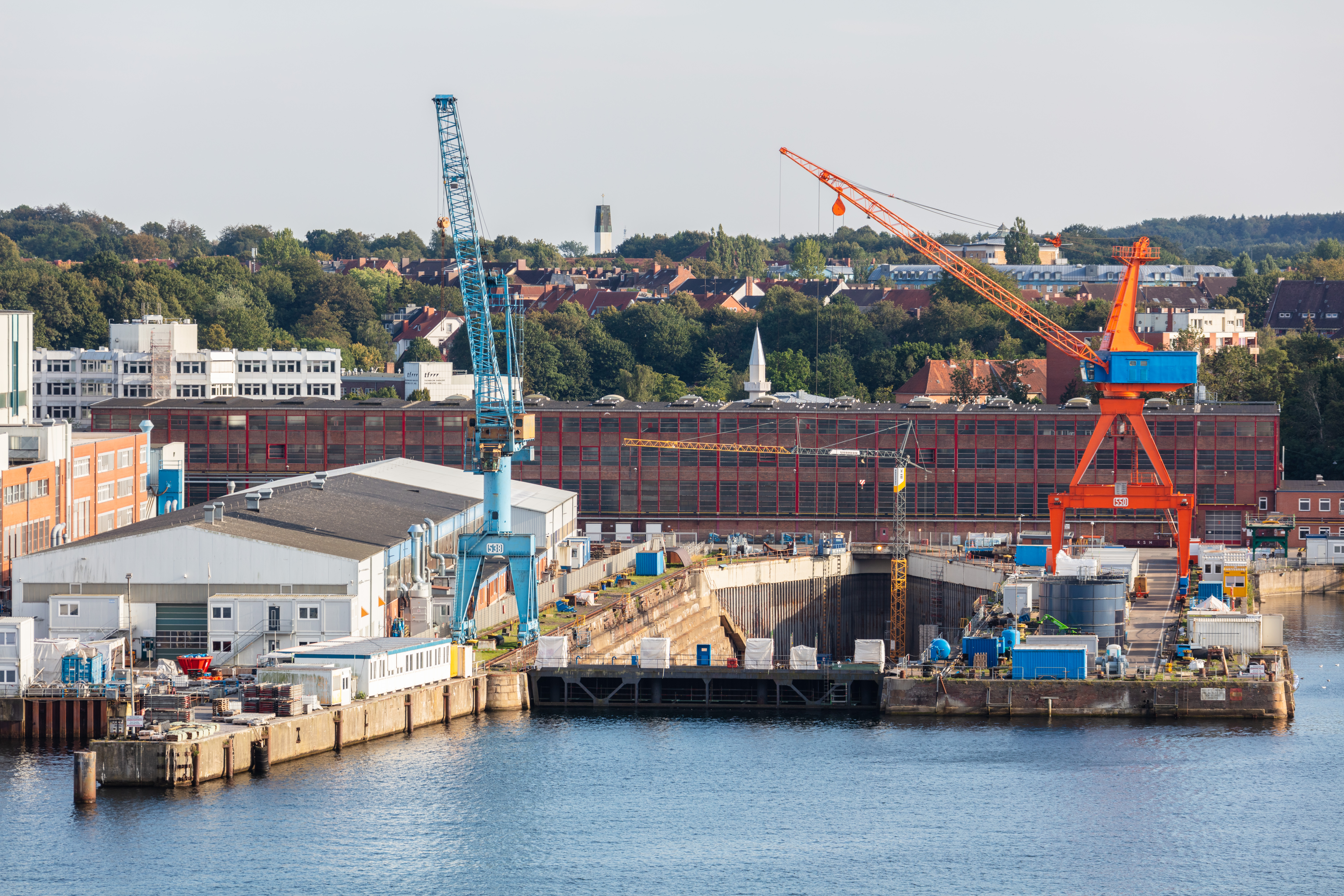
Port of Kiel

=== Air ===
Lübeck Airport and Sylt Airport are currently the only two airports which are operating in Schleswig-Holstein with the nearest international airport being Hamburg Airport which is located 89 km south of Kiel.

== Education ==
=== General education ===
In Schleswig-Holstein, the school education system begins with a four-year primary school, called Grundschule. Compulsory education applies to all children who turn six years old by June 30th of the current calendar year. In addition to the four-year primary school, the secondary level (grades 5 to 10), equivalent to middle school, consists of a two-tier school system comprising Gemeinschaftsschulen and Gymnasium. At all Gemeinschaftsschulen, Mittlere Reife can be obtained. Currently, 44 comprehensive schools also offer three additional years of highschool education, where students can complete the Abitur (higher education entrance qualification) after a total of 13 school years.

Most Gymnasium in Schleswig-Holstein offer a nine-year educational track, with only one Gymnasium leading to the Abitur in eight years. Three of the Gymnasien offer both three-year and two-year pathways for the Abitur.

The third option to obtain the Abitur is through the 'Berufliches Gymnasium' (vocational gymnasium). At the 28 berufliches Gymnasium in Schleswig-Holstein, students – unlike in the profile upper stage of regular Gymnasium and Gemeinschaftsschulen – have the opportunity to choose a specific subject area. The offered disciplines include agricultural economics, nutrition, technology, economics, as well as health and social care. Admission requirements for the berufliches Gymnasium include above-average completion of the Mittlere Reife.Currently, around one-fifth of the high school graduates in Schleswig-Holstein graduate from berufliches Gymnasium.

=== Academic education ===
There are three universities in Kiel (classical, budget 167.1 M€), Lübeck (medicine, budget 80.8 M€) and Flensburg (pedagogical, 37.4 M€). Six public Universities of Applied Sciences exist in Wedel, Altenholz, Flensburg, Heide, Kiel, and Lübeck. There is the Conservatory in Lübeck and the Muthesius Academy of Fine Arts in Kiel. There are also three private institutions of higher learning.

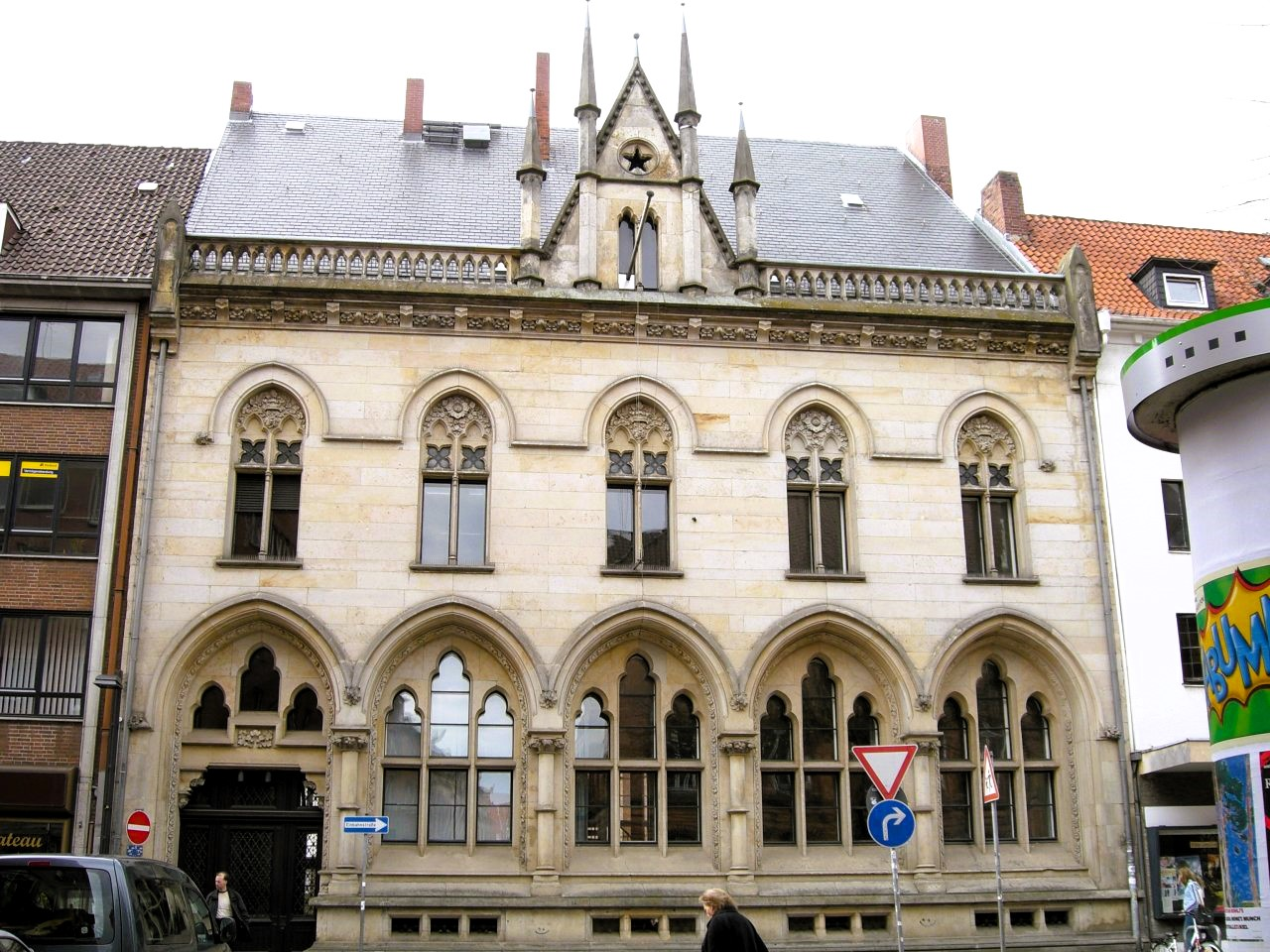
University of Lübeck

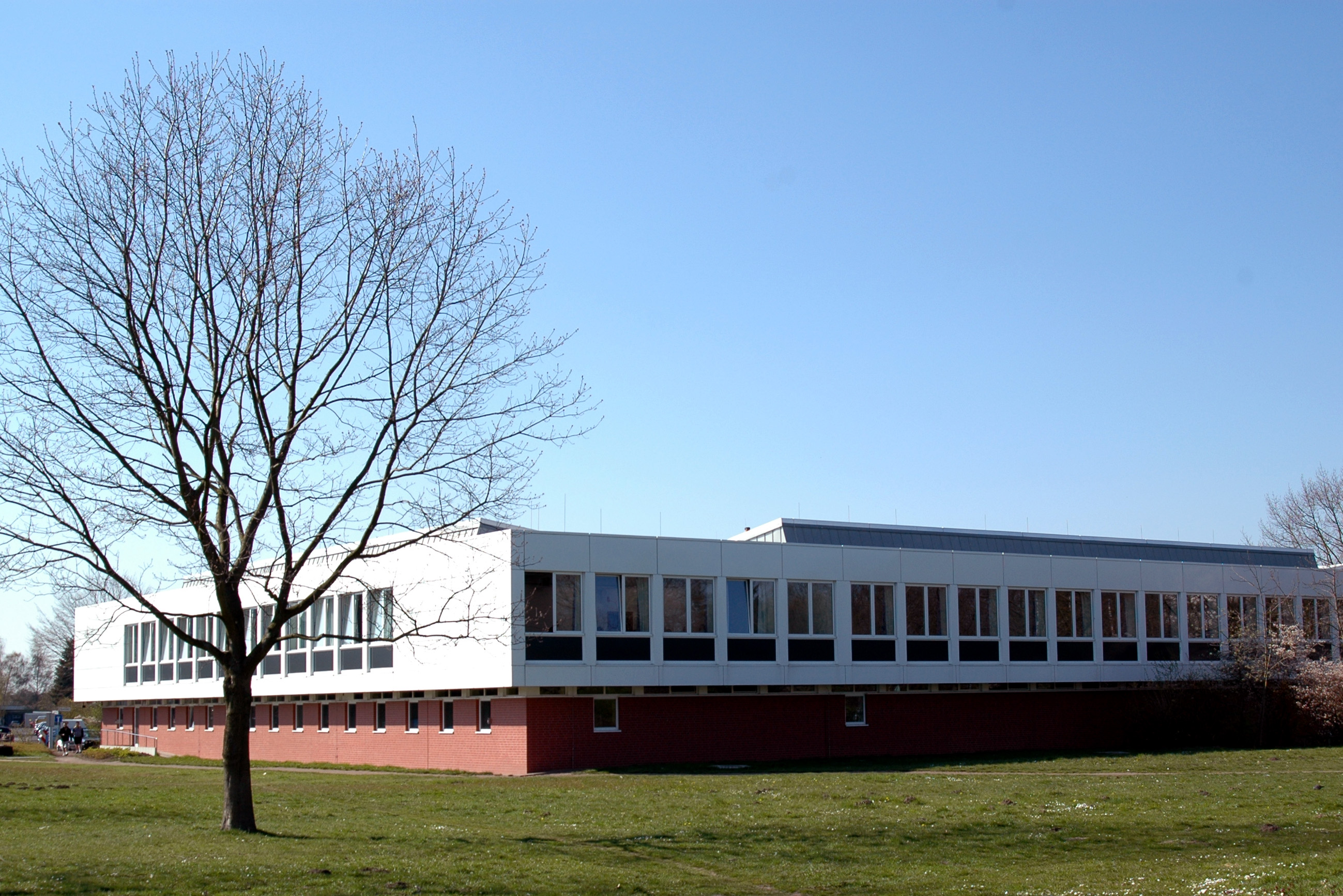
University of Applied Sciences in Lübeck

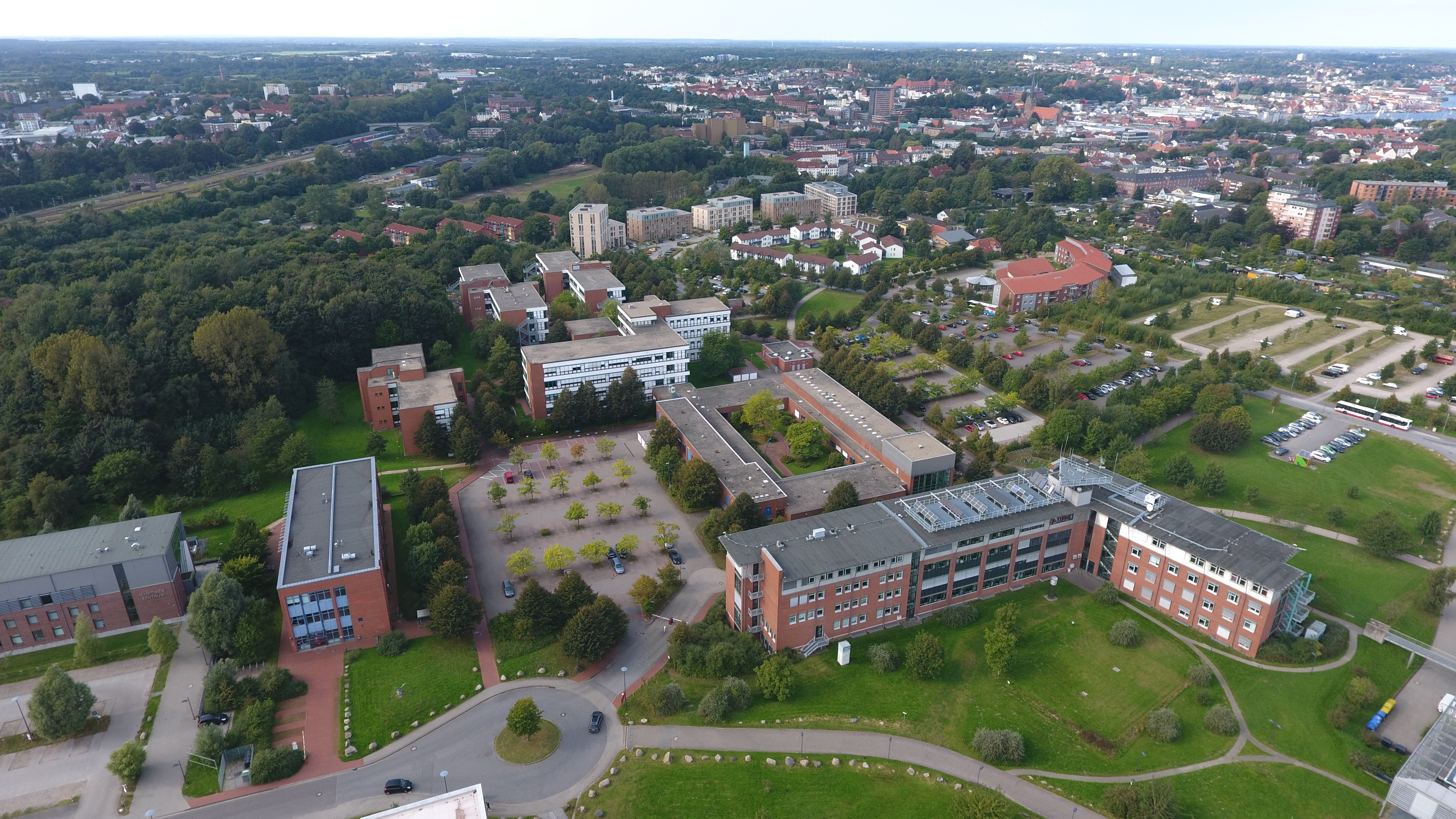
University of Applied Sciences Flensburg

== Honorary citizens ==
As of 2016, seven persons had been made honorary citizens of Schleswig-Holstein:

- Gerhard Stoltenberg †, former Ministerpräsident of Schleswig-Holstein and former federal Minister of Defence
- Uwe Ronneburger †, former chairman of the Schleswig-Holstein FDP
- Helmut Schmidt †, former German Bundeskanzler
- Siegfried Lenz †, distinguished German author; Schleswig-Holstein is the location of many of his stories
- Armin Mueller-Stahl, an actor who once worked at Lübeck Academy of Music and supported multiple museums
- Dr. Günther Fielmann †, businessman and philanthropist
- Heide Simonis †, first female Ministerpräsidentin of Schleswig-Holstein

== See also ==
- Outline of Germany
- Schleswig
- Holstein-Glückstadt
- Dukes of Holstein-Gottorp
- Schleswig-Holstein-Sonderburg
- Schleswig-Holstein-Sonderburg-Glücksburg
- Schleswig-Holstein-Sonderburg-Beck
- Schleswig-Holstein-Sonderburg-Augustenburg
- Schleswig-Holstein-Sonderburg-Plön
- Schleswig-Holstein-Sonderburg-Norburg
- Schleswig-Holstein-Sonderburg-Plön-Rethwisch
- State Constitutional Court of Schleswig-Holstein
- Coat of arms of Schleswig
- Region Sønderjylland-Schleswig
- Schleswig-Holstein Police

== Bibliography ==
Danish-language bibliography

- Rasmussen, Carsten Porskrog (2019). Hertugdømmet (in Danish). Aarhus Universitetsforlag. ISBN 978-87-7184-761-1.
- Gram-Andersen, Jesper (2020). De kongelige hertugdømmer: skydebrødre i Det Kongelige Kjøbenhavnske Skydeselskab og Danske Broderskab med relation til Slesvig og Holsten (in Danish). Kle-art. ISBN 978-87-92750-32-7.
- Jensen, N. P. (23 January 2019). Den første slesvigske krig 1848-50 (in Danish). Lindhardt og Ringhof. ISBN 978-87-26-10014-3.
- Buk-Swienty, Tom (2009). Slagtebænk Dybbøl: 18. april 1864 : historien om et slag (in Danish). Gyldendal A/S. ISBN 978-87-02-07756-8.<
- Frandsen, Steen Bo (2008). Holsten i helstaten: hertugdømmet inden for og uden for det danske monarki i første halvdel af 1800-tallet (in Danish). Museum Tusculanums Forlag, Københavns Universitet. ISBN 978-87-635-0754-7.
- Korsgaard, Ove (2024). Nationalstatens fødselsveer: Grundtvig, krig og geopolitik. Aarhus: Aarhus University Press. ISBN 978-87-7597-394-1.

German language bibliography

- Wenners, Peter (2019). Schleswig-Holstein und Dänemark: Geschichte im Spiegel der Literatur (in German). Boyens. ISBN 978-3-8042-1513-9.
- Jung, Frank (1 September 2014). 1864 - Der Krieg um Schleswig-Holstein (in German). Ellert & Richter Verlag. ISBN 978-3-8319-1016-8.

English language bibliography

- Svendsen, Nick B. (11 September 2018). Medieval wars in the Duchy of Schleswig 1410 to 1432: and the quest for the Nordic Countries. Books on Demand. ISBN 978-87-430-0687-9.
- Dicey, Edward; Lowe, Charles (9 June 2016). The Schleswig-Holstein War Between Denmark and the German States. Leonaur Limited. ISBN 978-1-78282-522-7.
- Schietzel, Kurt (2022). Unearthing Hedeby: An Archaeological Exploration of the Early Medieval Settlement of Hedeby : Documentation and Chronicle 1963-2013. Wachholtz. ISBN 978-3-529-01795-7.
- Bregnsbo, Michael; Jensen, Kurt Villads (2016). Schleswig Holstein: Contested Region(s) Through History. University Press of Southern Denmark. ISBN 978-87-7674-870-8.
- Svendsen, Nick (October 2012). Generals of the Danish Army in the First and Second Schleswig-Holstein Wars, 1848-50 And 1864: Rye, Du Plat, Schleppegrell. Helion, Limited. ISBN 978-1-908916-46-4.
- Svendsen, Nick (19 July 2010). The First Schleswig-Holstein War 1848-50. Helion and Company. ISBN 978-1-910294-19-2.
