= Constitutional court =

Court that deals primarily with constitutional law

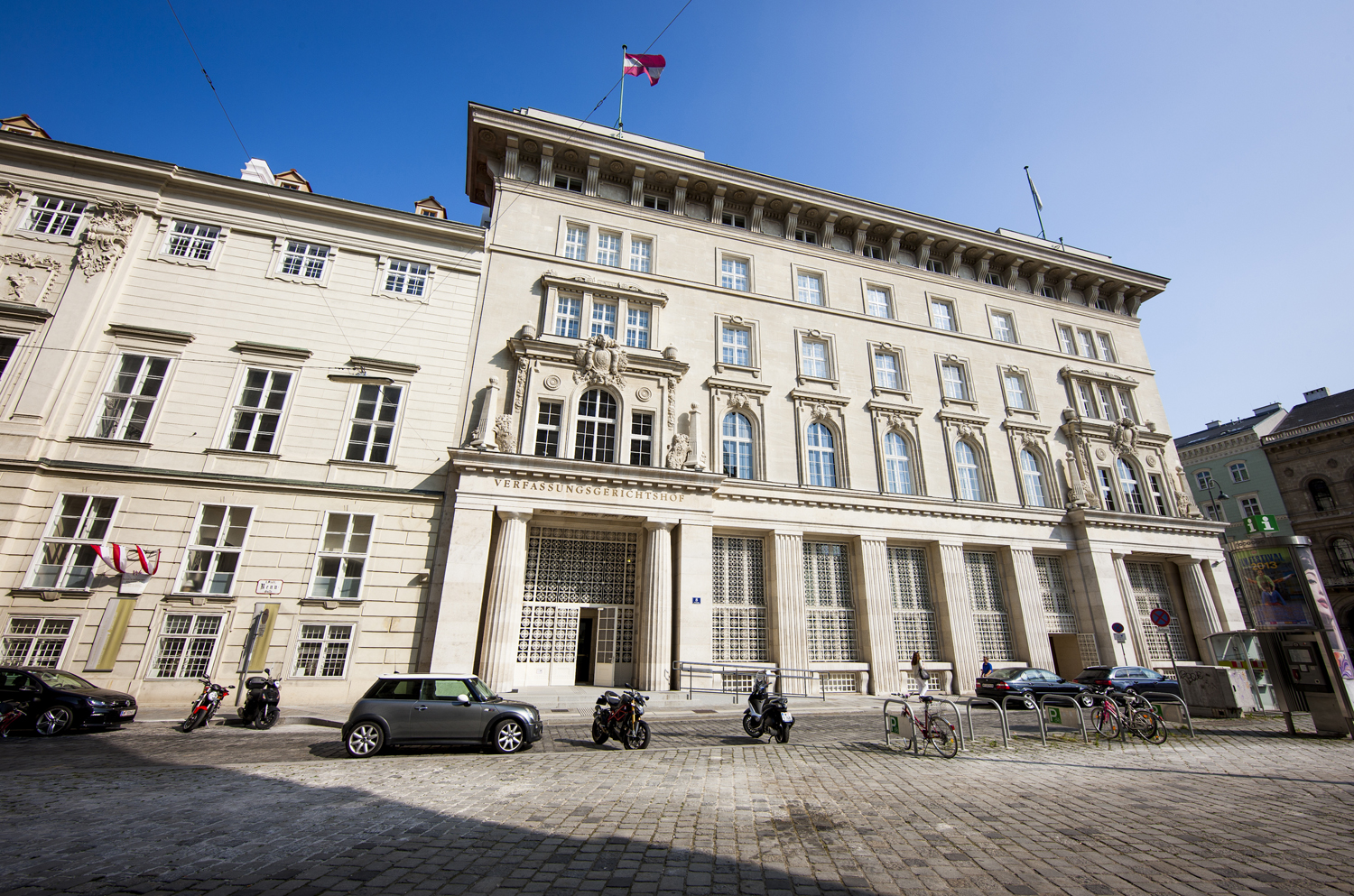
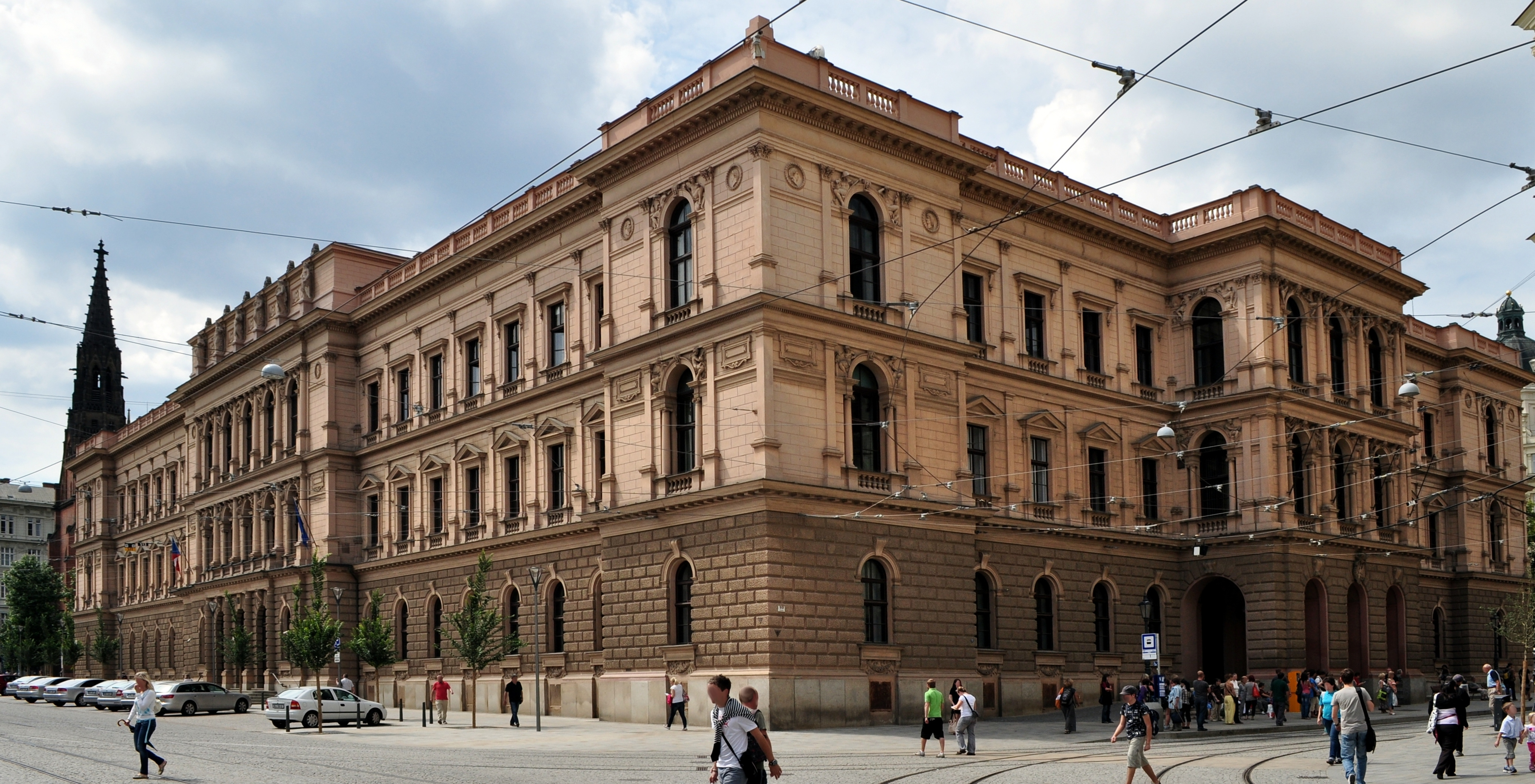
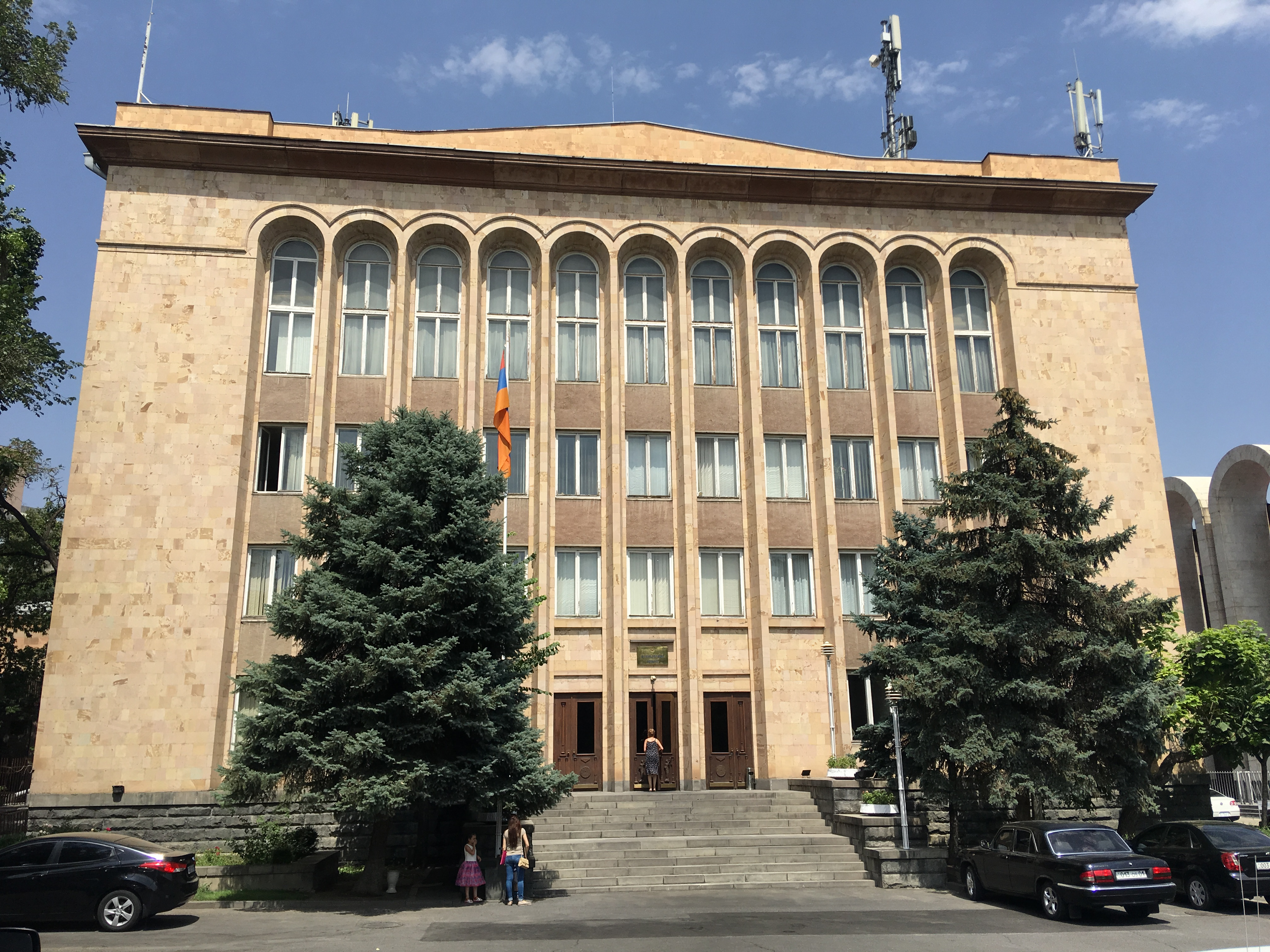
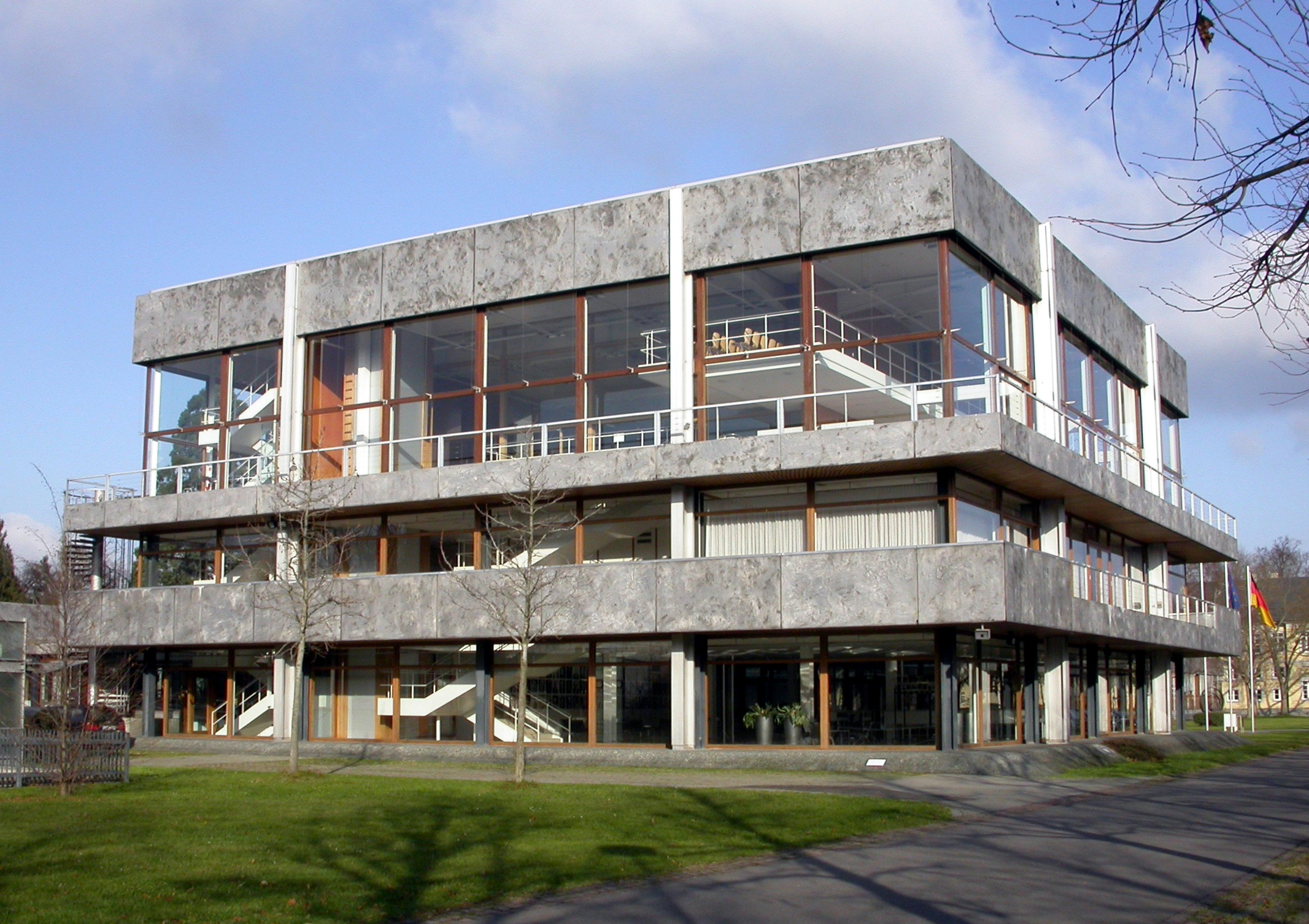
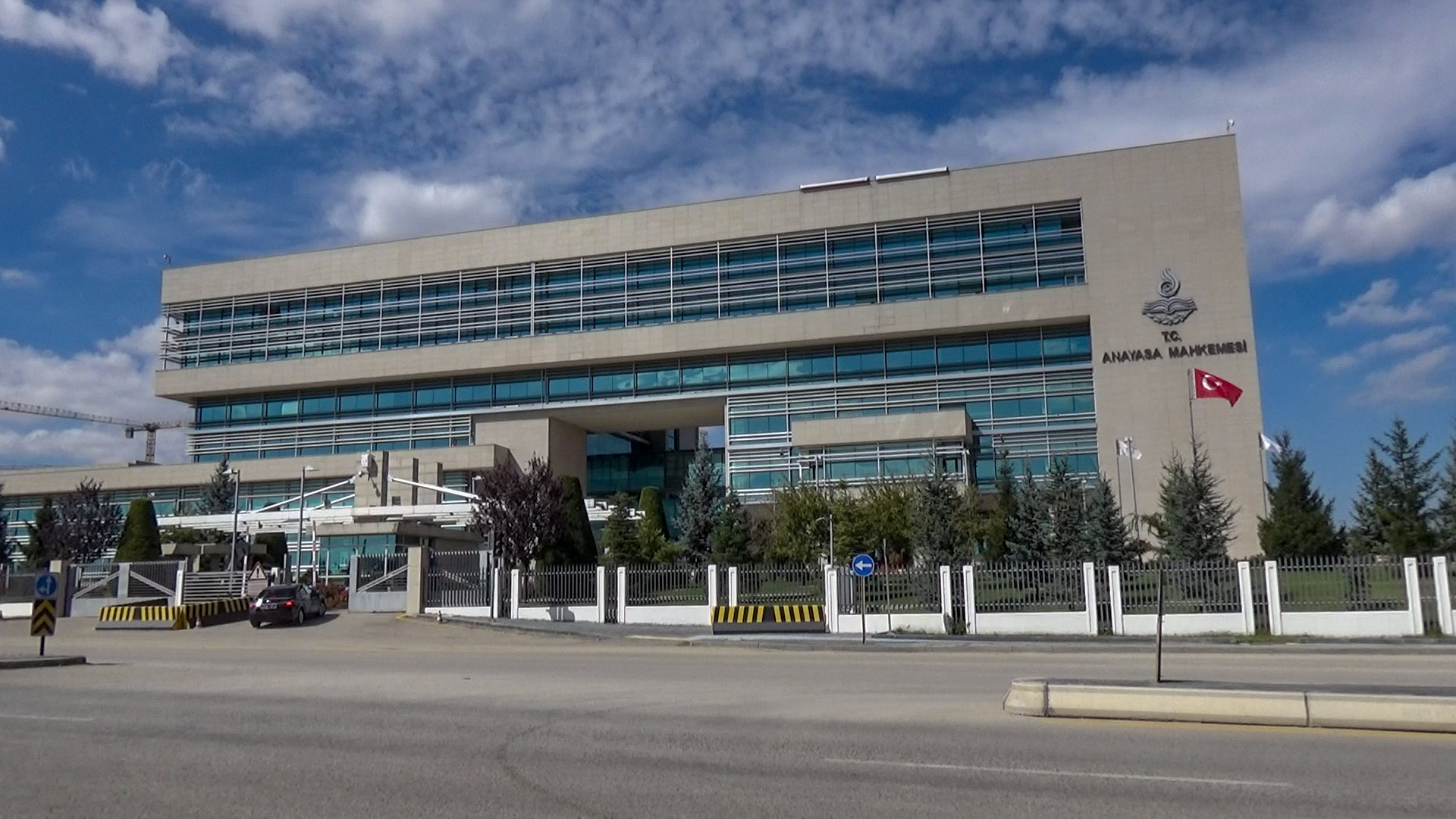
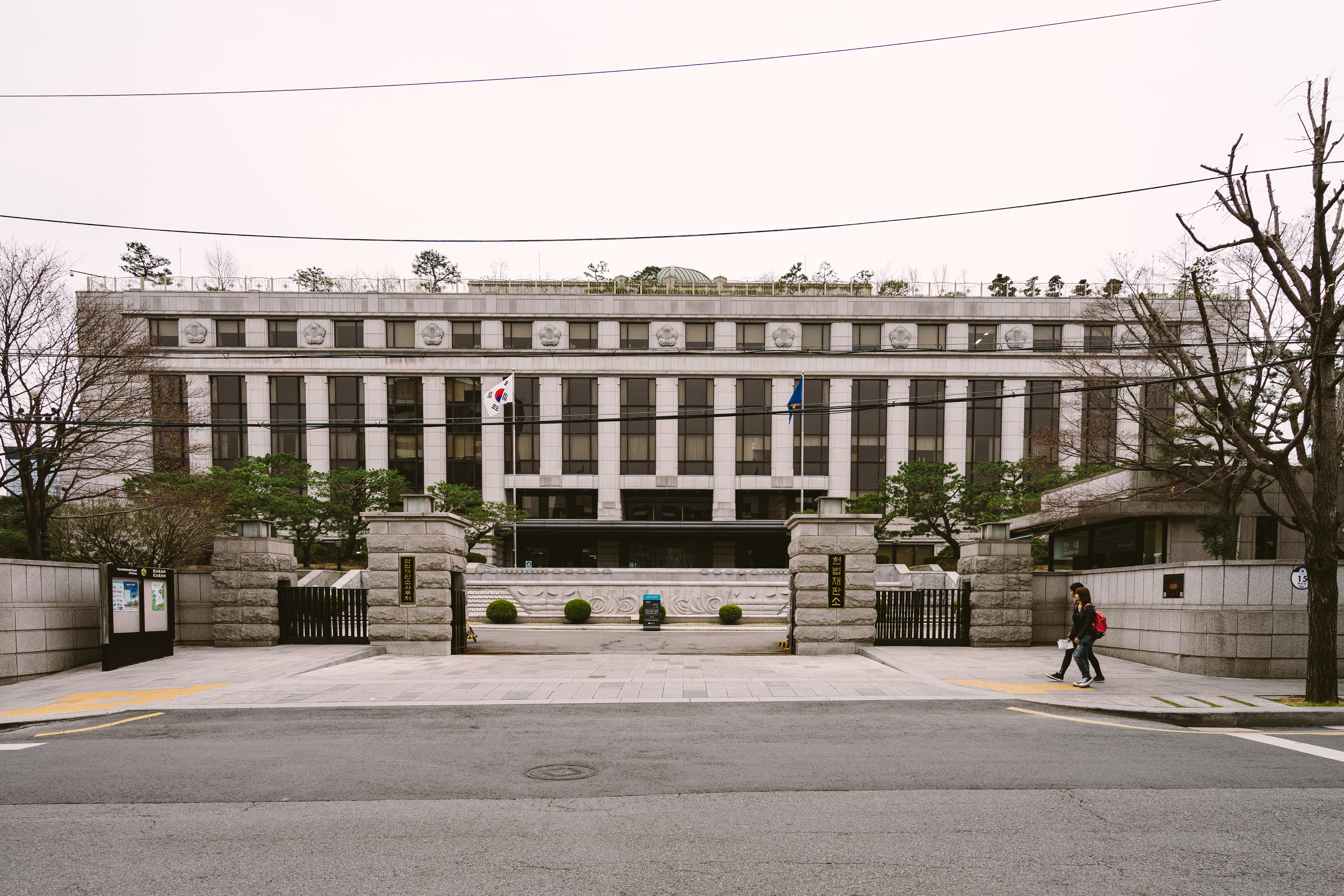
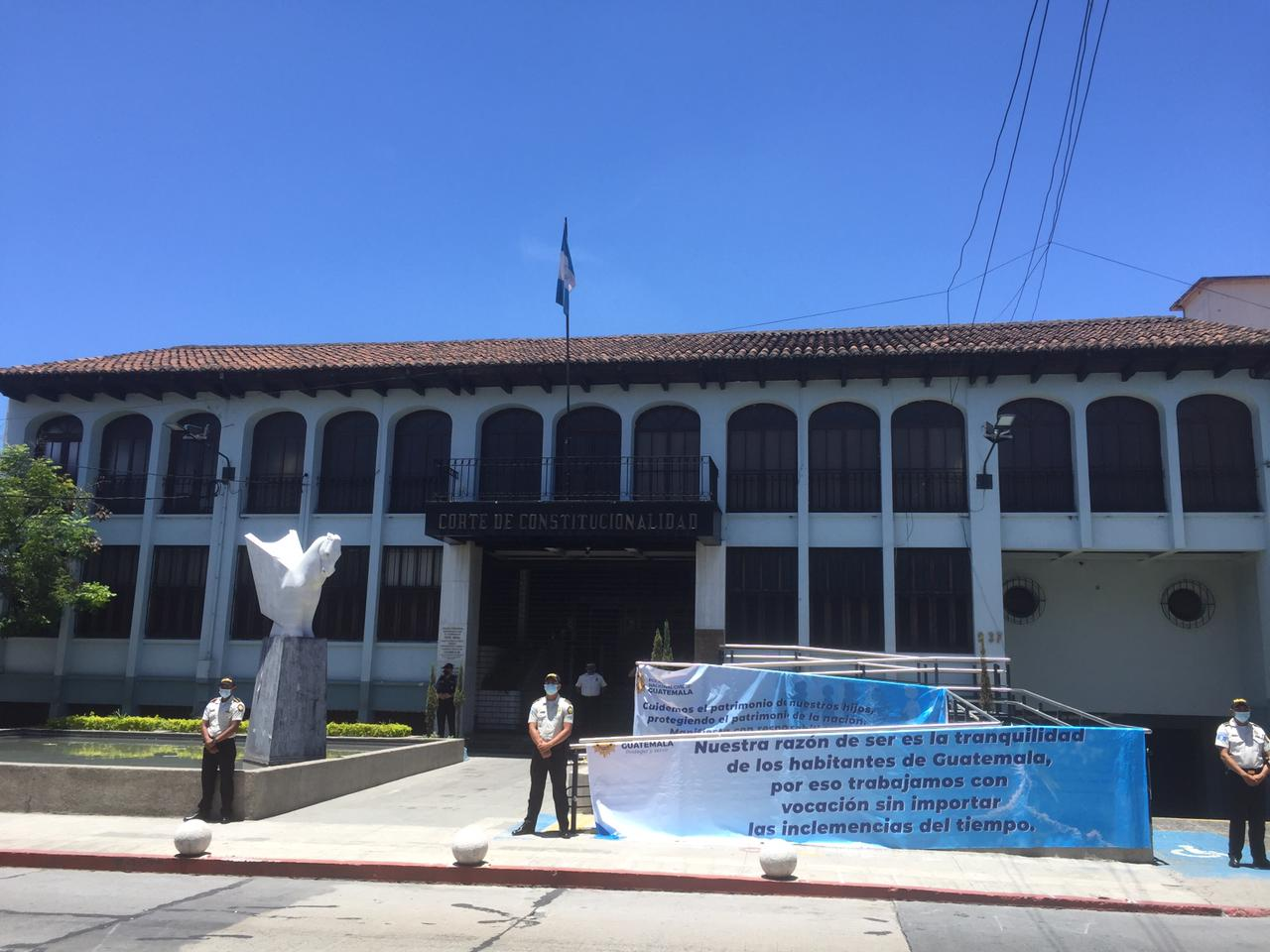
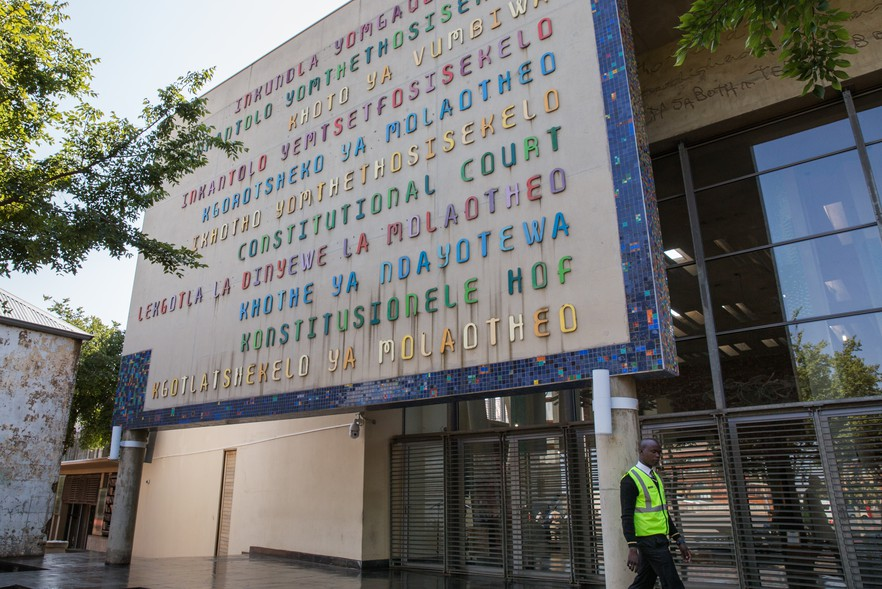
Seats of independent constitutional courts:
- Constitutional Court of Austria (Note: Austrian Constitutional Court (German: Verfassungsgerichtshof', VfGH) is the oldest constitutional court in the world established in 1921, resided in the building of the former Böhmische Hofkanzlei (English: Bohemian Court Chancellery), Judenplatz 11 in Vienna until 2012.)
- Constitutional Court of Czechia (Note: The picture shows hall for plenary sessions of the Constitutional Court of the Czech Republic in the building of the former Moravian Parliament in Brno. History of the Court follows up to 1920)

- Constitutional Court of Armenia
- Federal Constitutional Court of Germany

- Constitutional Court of Turkey
- Constitutional Court of Korea

- Constitutional Court of Guatemala
- Constitutional Court of South Africa

A constitutional court is a high court that deals primarily with constitutional law. Its main authority is to rule on whether laws that are challenged are in fact unconstitutional, i.e. whether they conflict with constitutionally established rules, rights, and freedoms, among other things.

== History ==
=== Before establishment of independent constitutional court ===
Prior to 1919, the United States, Canada and Australia had adopted the concept of judicial review by their courts, following shared principles of their similar common law legal systems, which they, in turn, had inherited from British colonial law. The Parthenopean Republic's constitution of 1799, written by Mario Pagano, envisaged an organ of magistrates reviewing constitutional law, the eforato, but lasted only 6 months. Before liberal revolutions, the Tribunal de Contrafaccions (1701-1714) of the Principality of Catalonia was established to solve and prosecute any actions, including the ones performed by the king or his officers, as well as royal edicts and minor legislation, contrary to the Catalan constitutions. The 1776 Constitution of Pennsylvania and 1777 Constitution of Vermont both establish a "Council of Censors" separate from the other branches of government, with the task of "recommending to the legislature the repealing of such laws as appear to them to have been enacted contrary to the principles of the constitution," an institution somewhat similar to a modern constitutional court.

=== After establishment of independent constitutional court ===
In 1919 the First Austrian Republic established the first dedicated constitutional court, the Constitutional Court of Austria, which however existed in name only until 10 October 1920, when the country's new constitution came into effect, upon which the court gained the power to review the laws of Austria's federal states. The 1920 Constitution of Czechoslovakia, which came into effect on 2 February 1920, was the first to provide for a dedicated court for judicial review of parliamentary laws, but the court did not convene until November 1921. The organization and competences of both courts were influenced by constitutional theories of Hans Kelsen. Subsequently, this idea of having a separate special constitutional court that only heard cases concerning the constitutionality of the national legislature's acts became known as the Austrian System, and it was subsequently adopted by many other countries e.g. Liechtenstein (1925), Greece (1927), Spain (1931), Germany (1949) etc.

== National ==
The following list consists of countries with separate constitutional courts. Some other countries do not have separate constitutional courts, but instead delegate constitutional judicial authority to their ordinary court system, with the final decision-making power resting in the supreme ordinary court. Nonetheless, such courts are sometimes also called "constitutional courts". (Note: For example, the Supreme Court of the United States has been called the world's oldest constitutional court because it was one of the earliest courts in the world to invalidate a law as unconstitutional (Marbury v. Madison), even though it is not solely a constitutional court)

- Albania
- Angola
- Armenia
- Austria
- Azerbaijan
- Belarus
- Belgium
- Benin
- Bosnia and Herzegovina
- Bulgaria
- Burundi
- Chad
- Chile
- Colombia
- Democratic Republic of the Congo
- Croatia
- Czech Republic
- Dominican Republic
- Ecuador
- Egypt
- Gabon
- Georgia
- Germany
- Guatemala
- Hungary
- Indonesia
- Iran
- Iraq
- Italy
- Jordan
- Kazakhstan
- Republic of Korea (South Korea)
- Kosovo
- Kuwait
- Kyrgyzstan
- Latvia
- Lebanon
- Lithuania
- Luxembourg
- Malta
- Moldova
- Mongolia
- Montenegro
- Myanmar
- Niger
- North Macedonia
- Pakistan
- Palestine
- Peru
- Poland
- Portugal
- Romania
- Russia
- San Marino
- Serbia
- Singapore
- Slovakia
- Slovenia
- South Africa
- Spain
- Suriname
- Republic of China (Taiwan)
- Tajikistan
- Thailand
- Turkey
- Uganda
- Ukraine
- Uzbekistan
- Zambia
- Zimbabwe

== Subnational ==
=== Germany ===
Constitutional Court of Baden-Württemberg (German: Verfassungsgerichthof für das Land Baden-Württemberg; abbreviated: VerfGH BW) is the constitutional court for the German Land (state) of Baden-Württemberg and thereby a constitutional organ on the state level. Besides its power of judicial review (Normenkontrolle), it has a number of other powers and responsibilities which are assigned to it by the state constitution.

Constitutional Court of Bavaria (German: Bayrischer Verfassungsgerichthof; abbreviated: VerfGH BY) is the state constitutional court for the Free State of Bavaria. It is, along with the Landesregierung (state government) and the Landtag (state parliament), one of the three state constitutional institutions and has the power of judicial review: It may examine the compatibility of state laws with the state constitution.

Constitutional Court of Berlin (German: Verfassungsgerichthof des Landes Berlin; abbreviated: VerfGH BE) is the constitutional court of the city-state of Berlin which is simultaneously the capital of the Federal Republic of Germany. It is located in the same building as the Kammergericht (Oberlandesgericht) and is authorized by Article 84 Constitution of the city-state of Berlin. It has the power of judicial review, the power to review electoral complaints and the power to hear cases concerning complaints against referendums and popular initiatives among others.

Composition and eligibility requirements of the constitutional courts of German states
State	Court	Justices	Deputies	Minimum age	Maximum age for non-professional judges (e.g. university professors or lawyers)	Maximum age for professional judges
Baden-Württemberg	Constitutional Court of Baden-Württemberg	9	9	—	—	—
Bavaria	Constitutional Court of Bavaria	38	38	40	—	65
Berlin	Constitutional Court of Berlin	9	—	35	—	—
Brandenburg	Constitutional Court of Brandenburg	9	—	35	68	68
Bremen	State Constitutional Court of the Free Hanseatic City of Bremen	7	7	35	—	65
Hamburg	Constitutional Court of Hamburg	9	9	40	—	65
Hesse	State Constitutional Court of Hesse	11	11	35	—	65
Lower Saxony	State Constitutional Court of Lower Saxony	9	9	35	—	—
Mecklenburg-Vorpommern	Constitutional Court of Mecklenburg-Western Pomerania	7	7	35	68	68
North Rhine-Westphalia	Constitutional Court of North Rhine-Westphalia	7	7	35	—	65
Rhineland-Palatinate	Constitutional Court of Rhineland-Palatinate	9	9	35	70	65
Saarland	Constitutional Court of Saarland	8	8	—	—	—
Saxony	Constitutional Court of the Free State of Saxony	9	9	35	70	65
Saxony-Anhalt	State Constitutional Court of Saxony-Anhalt	7	7	40	—	—
Schleswig-Holstein	State Constitutional Court of Schleswig-Holstein	7	7	40	—	—
Thuringia	Thuringian Constitutional Court	9	9	35	70	65

=== Russia ===
Before 2020, several republics of Russia had their own constitutional courts, while in other federal subjects like oblasts and federal cities they were known as charter courts, as republics are the only federal subjects to have their own constitutions. Constitutional and charter courts were completely independent and were not subordinate courts to the Constitutional Court of Russia.

Constitutional and charter courts used to hear cases relating to conformity with regional constitutions or charters of laws adopted by regional legislatures and governors' decrees, and in this category of cases constitutional and charter courts were courts of single instance.

Constitutional and charter courts of the federal subjects were disestablished by the 2020 amendments to the Constitution of Russia.

As of 2020, constitutional courts remained in force in the 12 (out of 22) following republics:

- Adygea (known as the Constitutional Chamber of Adygea until 2000)
- Bashkortostan
- Chechnya
- Dagestan
- Ingushetia
- Kabardino-Balkaria
- Karelia
- Komi
- Mari El
- North Ossetia–Alania
- Sakha
- Tatarstan (see Constitutional Court of Tatarstan)

In the republics of Buryatia and Tuva, the constitutional courts were abolished by the republican constitutional laws in 2018 and 2019, respectively. In the republics of Bashkortostan, Tatarstan, and Sakha, the disestablished constitutional courts were transformed into constitutional councils, without any judicial powers.

Until 2020, charter courts existed in following federal subjects:

- Kaliningrad Oblast
- Saint Petersburg
- Sverdlovsk Oblast

The charter court of Chelyabinsk Oblast was disestablished in 2014.

=== Former Yugoslavia ===
In addition to the federal Constitutional Court of Yugoslavia, each of the six constituent republics established its own constitutional court with the promulgation of the 1963 Constitution. The 1974 constitutional reforms further introduced provincial constitutional courts within the Socialist Republic of Serbia, namely the Constitutional Court of Vojvodina and Constitutional Court of Kosovo. Following the breakup of Yugoslavia, the republican courts (those of Bosnia and Herzegovina, Croatia, Macedonia, Montenegro, Serbia and Slovenia) became the highest bodies of constitutional review in their respective successor states. The provincial constitutional courts in Serbia were abolished in 1990.

In the immediate aftermath of the country's dissolution, the Federal Republic of Yugoslavia (Serbia and Montenegro) maintained separate subnational courts. However, following Montenegro's independence in 2006, Bosnia and Herzegovina remained the only state in the region with subnational constitutional courts: alongside the state-level Constitutional Court of Bosnia and Herzegovina, there are also the Constitutional Court of the Federation of Bosnia and Herzegovina and the Constitutional Court of Republika Srpska.

== See also ==
- Constitution
- Constitutional Council (disambiguation)
- Constitutional institution
- Constitutional law
- Constitutional review
- Constitutionalism
- Judiciary
- Judicial review
- Jurisprudence
- Parliamentary sovereignty
- Rule of law
- Rule According to Higher Law
- Venice Commission
- Association of Asian Constitutional Courts and Equivalent Institutions
