= Constitutional Court of North Rhine-Westphalia =

German state constitutional court

Constitutional Court of the state of North Rhine-Westphalia
- Verfassungsgerichtshof für das Land Nordrhein-Westfalen
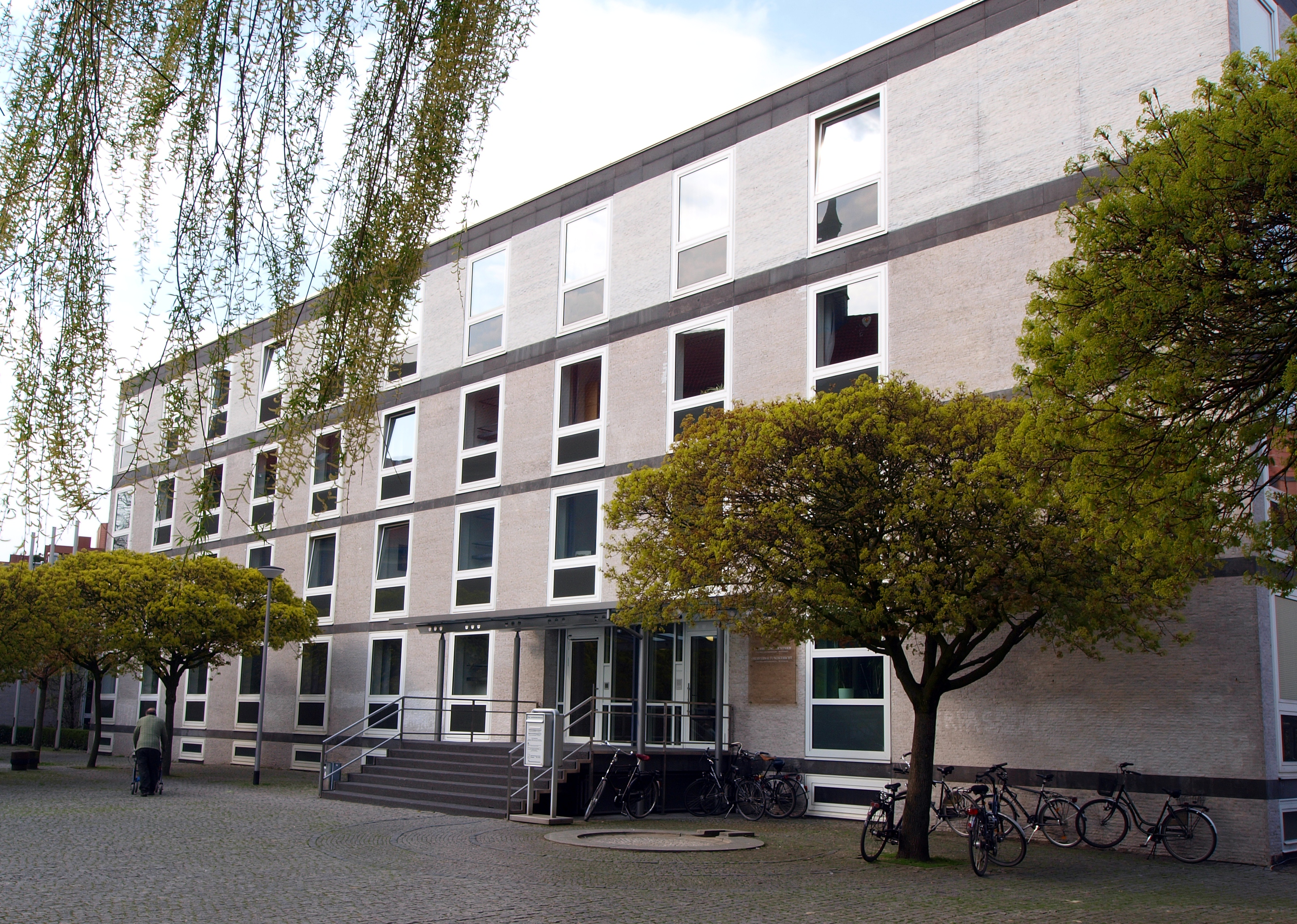
- The court building in the city of Münster
- Interactive map of Constitutional Court of the state of North Rhine-Westphalia
- Established: 1952
- Jurisdiction: State of North Rhine-Westphalia
- Appeals to: Constitutional Court of Germany
- Judge term length: 10 years, non-renewable term
- Number of positions: 7
- Website: https://www.vgh.nrw.de/index.php

President
- Currently: Barbara Dauner-Lieb
- Since: 1 June 2021

The Constitutional Court of North Rhine-Westphalia (German: Verfassungsgericht für das Land Nordrhein-Westfalen; abbreviated: VerfGH NRW or VGH NRW) is the constitutional court of the most populous German state NRW (North Rhine-Westphalia). Art. 76 of the state constitutions authorizes and establishes the court. In its history the method of composition has been changed multiple times.

The courts seat is in Münster since its founding in 1952. The city was chosen as the courts seat in order to signal its distance to the state capital of Düsseldorf and its independence from the state government. It sits in the same building as the Oberverwaltungsgericht für das Land Nordrhein-Westfalen.

From 27 February 2013 to the end of May 2021 Ricarda Brandts served as the president of the court. She was the first woman to ever hold that position.

== Composition ==
Until 2017 the President of the Oberverwaltungsgericht für das Land Nordrhein-Westfalen, the two Presidents of the oldest Oberlandesgerichte were ex officio members of the court while the four other members were elected by the Landtag of NRW to serve a non-renewable term of six years. At least half of these elected members had to Befähigung zum Richteramt, (German a certificate of competence to serve as judges; i.e. a Law Degree). In March 1952 a Law went into force that awarded the position of President of the Court to the President of the Supreme Administrative Court of the state of North Rhine-Westphalia.

On 25 October 2016 the Landtag passed a Law to amend the state constitution that changed the composition of the court. From then on all members were elected by the Landtag with a 2/3 Supermajority for a non-renewable term of 10 years and all members had to have a certificate of competence to serve as judges. Furthermore, the changed constitution no longer intended for any judge to sit on the bench ex officio.

== Juristiction ==
The Jurisdiction of the court and its powers are defined in the fifth section of the state constitution. The constitutional court shall adjudicate:

- on the interpretation of the constitution on the occasion of disputes about the scope of the rights and obligations of a top-level state authority or of other parties who have been provided with their own rights by virtue of this constitution or in the rules of procedure of a top-level state authority;
- in the case of differences of opinion or doubts about the compatibility of Land law with this constitution on application of the Landesregierung or of one-third of the members of the Landtag;
- Verfassungsbeschwerden (constitutional complaints) by individuals (Individualverfassungsbeschwerde) and municipalities (kommunale Verfassungsbeschwerde)
- Konkrete Normenkontrolle
- in other cases defined by law.

Furthermore, the Articles 32, 33 and 68 lay out additional powers and responsibilities of the court. Article 32 allows the court to prevent associations and people "who undertake to suppress national freedoms or use force against the people" from taking part in elections (i.e. voting and running for office) if it is requested by either the Landesregierung (state government) or 3/5s of the Landtag. Article 33 allows deputies of the Landtag who have lost their membership (were excluded from the Landtag) to appeal that decision to the Constitutional Court of Justice. Article 68 of the state Constitution grants it the power to hear appeals in the case that the Landesregierung has rejected the admissibility of a popular initiative.

Article 63 an article of the constitution that has since then ceased to apply used to lay out the procedure for impeaching the Ministerpräsident or any other minister. If they had been charged by the Landtag with a two-thirds majority for "deliberate or grossly violation of the constitution or of any other law" the court would have the authority to decide whether or not they had forfeited their offices. However the article had been repealed in 2016.

== Current Judges ==
The Current judges on the court are:

Judge	Born	Joined	President
Barbara Dauner-Lieb	April 28, 1955 (age 71)	June 2021	2021–present
Andrea Heusch	May 29, 1964 (age 62)	July 2014	–
Bernd Grzeszick	December 23, 1965 (age 60)	June 2021	–
Joachim Wieland	July 30, 1951 (age 75)	May 2006	–
Claudio Nedden-Boeger	January 13, 1966 (age 60)	June 2012	–
Dirk Gilberg	May 29, 1964 (age 62)	January 2020	–
Matthias Röhl	July 15, 1969 (age 57)	March 2018	–

== See also ==
- Constitution of North Rhine-Westphalia
- Constitutional review
- Judicial review
- Constitutional review in Germany
- Verfassungsbeschwerde
