= Constitutional Court of Bavaria =

The Constitutional Court of Bavaria is the state constitutional court of the Free State of Bavaria and is one of the three constitutional bodies alongside the state parliament and the state government.

== Foundation, history and buildings ==
The Constitutional Court was established in its current form by the Constitution of the Free State of Bavaria of 2 December 1946 and formally by law of 22 July 1947 (GVBl p. 147) retroactively to 1 July 1947. Its predecessor was the State Court of Bavaria, which was founded on March 30, 1850. The Bavarian Constitutional Court is now housed in the New Justice Building on Prielmayerstrasse in Munich, which also houses the civil senates of the Munich Higher Regional Court.

From 1992 to 2001, a woman headed the court for the first time: Hildegund Holzheid, President of the Higher Regional Court of Munich.

== Constitutional basis ==
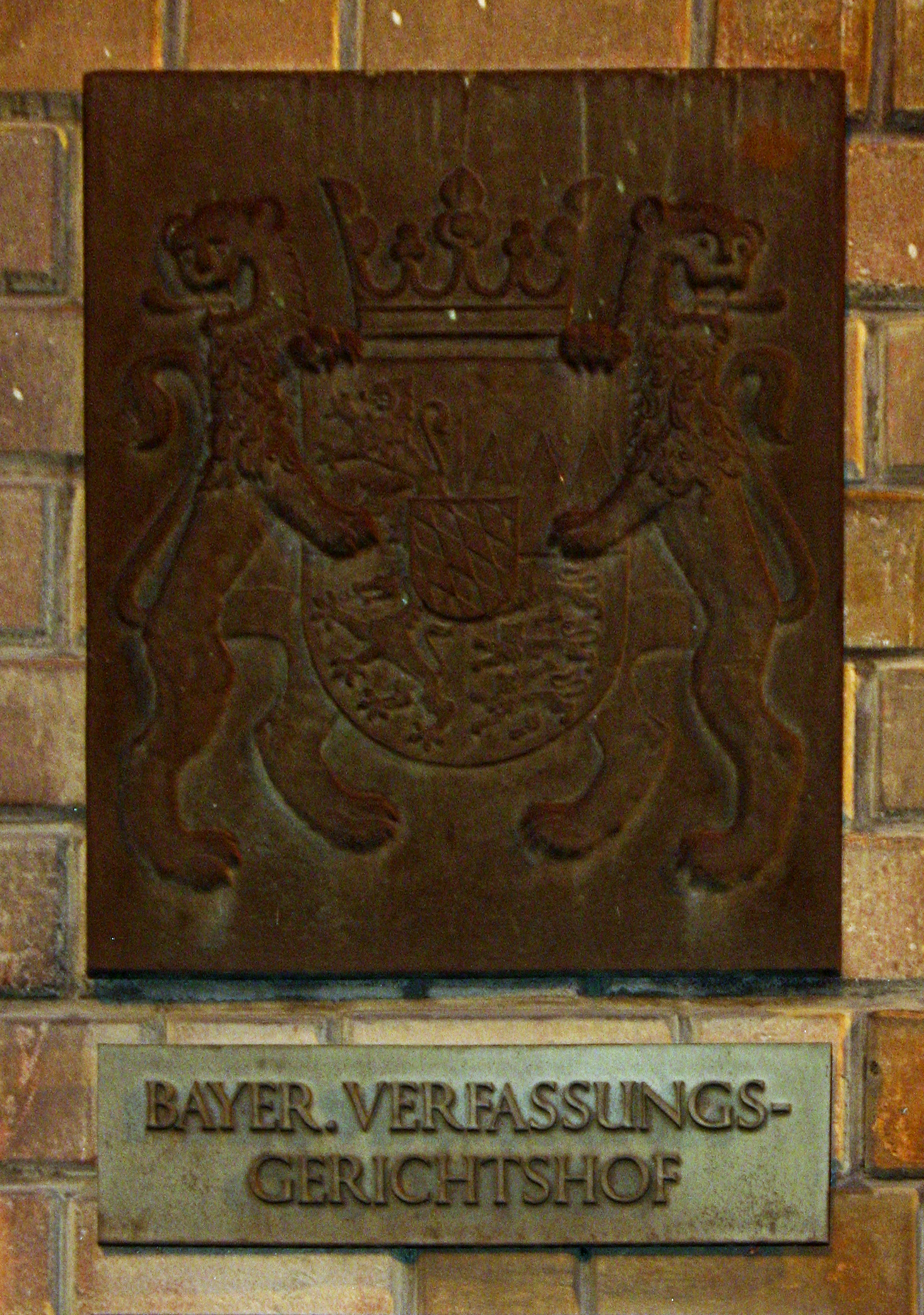
House sign

The powers and duties of the Bavarian Constitutional Court are regulated in Section 5 of the First Main Part of the Bavarian Constitution.

The Constitutional Court is the highest court for constitutional issues and decides on

- Charges against members of the Bavarian State Government or the State Parliament of Bavaria
- the exclusion of groups of voters from the election and the validity of the election
- Judicial review and constitutional procedural law on making state constitution
- Disputes between the supreme state organs

In addition, the popular lawsuit provides every citizen in Bavaria with the possibility of bringing an action against state laws, legislation or regulations before the Constitutional Court, even without being affected.

== President, members and judicial election ==
The Bavarian Constitutional Court consists of the president, 22 professional judges, 15 other members and their representatives. The president must be elected from the presidents of the Bavarian Higher Regional Courts; since 1959, the choice has always fallen on the president of the Higher Regional Court in Munich. Since 2021, Hans-Joachim Heßler has therefore served as President of the Bavarian Constitutional Court. In terms of protocol, the president of the Constitutional Court holds the third highest rank in the Free State, after the prime minister and the president of the State Parliament.

Both the president and the 38 honorary judges at the Constitutional Court are appointed by the state parliament with a simple majority. The Constitutional Court was therefore said to have a certain affinity with the Bavarian majority party, the CSU. However, a referendum to change the rules for electing judges failed in 2000.

== Proceedings ==
The procedural legal basis for proceedings before the Bavarian Constitutional Court are the provisions of the Law on the Bavarian Constitutional Court. In this connection, Article 9 of the Bavarian Constitutional Court Act refers to the provisions of the Code of Criminal Procedure regarding exclusion from the office of judge. Of particular practical relevance are the proceedings concerning constitutional complaints and the proceedings concerning interim injunctions pursuant to Article 26 of the Bavarian Constitutional Court Act.

=== Constitutional complaints ===
The procedure for the constitutional complaint before the Bavarian Constitutional Court is essentially the same as the procedure before the Federal Constitutional Court and differs only in the following four points:

- The deadline for filing a constitutional complaint is two months
- The Bavarian Constitutional Court may impose on the complainant an advance payment of up to EUR 1,500 in accordance with Article 27, paragraph 1 of the Bavarian Constitutional Court Act. In this case, the proceedings before the Bavarian Constitutional Court will only be continued if the complainant pays this advance payment in advance.
- The hearing of the Bavarian Ministry of Justice is mandatory; the Ministry of Justice can comment on the procedure or refrain from commenting
- The decisions of the Bavarian Constitutional Court must always be justified, even in cases of obvious unfoundedness

The proceedings of the Constitutional Court are generally free of charge. However, if a constitutional complaint or popular action is inadmissible or manifestly unfounded, the court can impose a fee of up to 1,500 euros on the complainant or applicant, which can also be requested in advance.

=== Interim orders ===
Interim orders are governed by Article 26 of the Bavarian Constitutional Court Act. The procedure corresponds to that of the Federal Constitutional Court Act. An example of a rejection of an interim order in a popular action procedure is the decision of 7 March 2019 concerning the Police Tasks Act of Bavaria..

=== Judgments ===
Judgments of the Bavarian Constitutional Court are not issued "in the name of the people", but according to Article 25 paragraph 1 BayVfGHG "in the name of the Free State of Bavaria".

== See also ==
- Politics of Bavaria
