= Constitutional Court of the State of Berlin =

German state constitutional court

- Verfassungsgerichtshof des Landes Berlin
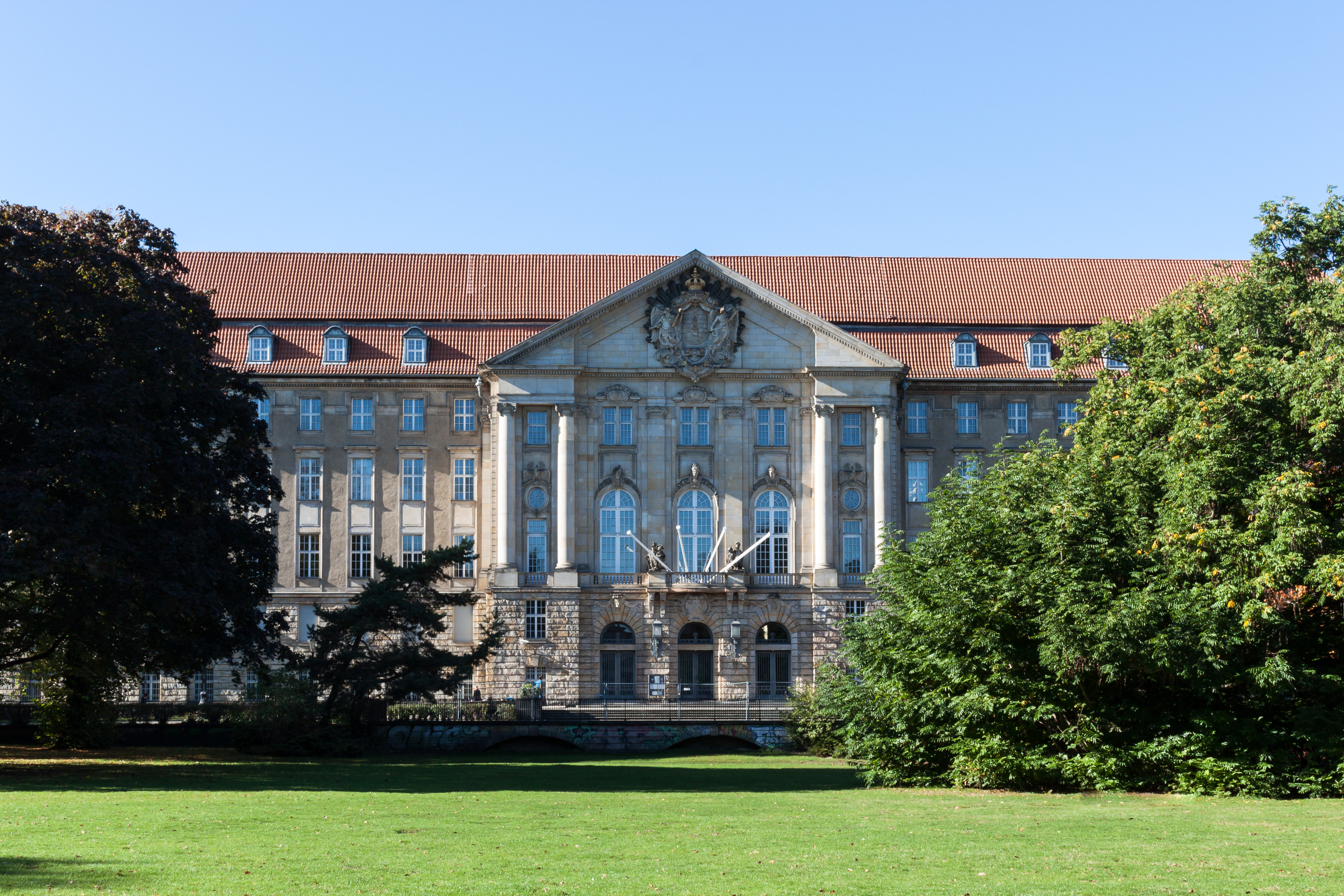
- Constitutional Court of the State of Berlin in the Kammergericht building
- Interactive map of Constitutional Court of the State of Berlin
- 52°29′33″N 13°21′26″E
- Established: 1992
- Jurisdiction: Berlin
- Location: Berlin, Germany
- Coordinates: 52°29′33″N 13°21′26″E
- Authorised by: Article 84 Verfassung von Berlin
- Judge term length: 7 years
- Number of positions: 9
- Language: German
- Website: berlin.de/gerichte/sonstige-gerichte/verfassungsgerichtshof

President of the Constitutional Court of the State of Berlin
- Currently: Ludgera Selting
- Since: November 2019

Vice-President of the Constitutional Court of the State of Berlin
- Currently: Björn Retzlaff
- Since: July 2024

The Constitutional Court of the State of Berlin (German: Verfassungsgerichtshof des Landes Berlin; abbreviated BerlVerfGH) is the state constitutional court of Berlin. It has its seat at the Kammergericht building in the Schöneberg district of Berlin. Since November 2019, Ludgera Selting is the president of the court.

== Jurisdiction ==
The jurisdiction and duties of the Constitutional Court of the State of Berlin are regulated in Article 84 of the Constitution of Berlin, as well as in the Gesetz über den Verfassungsgerichtshof (VerfGHG). The court is mainly responsible for deciding the following types of claims:

- Verfassungsbeschwerden (Article 84(2) No 5 Constitution of Berlin). In 2015, almost 96 percent of all petitions received by the court were constitutional complaints.
- Organstreit proceedings (Organstreitverfahren; Article 84(2) No 1 Constitution of Berlin)
- Abstract judicial review of statutes (Abstrakte Normenkontrollverfahren; Article 84(2) No 4 Constitution of Berlin)
- Specific judicial review of statutes (Konkrete Normenkontrollverfahren; Article 84(2) No 2 Constitution of Berlin)
- Electoral complaints (Wahlprüfungen; Section 14(2) No 1 and 2 Gesetz über den Verfassungsgerichtshof)
- Complaints concerning popular initiatives, petitions for referendums and referendums (Section 41 of the Gesetz über Volksinitiative, Volksbegehren und Volksentscheid)

== History ==
=== Institutional history ===
The Constitution of Berlin of 1 September 1950 contained in its Article 72 a mandate to establish a state constitutional court for Berlin. However, due to the special political and legal position of Berlin before the German reunification, such a court was not established and the mandate for the constitution of the court was abolished in 1974. Therefore, no state constitutional court existed in Berlin until 1992.

To rectify this situation, the Abgeordnetenhaus of Berlin passed a law on the establishment of a Berlin constitutional court in 1990, which entered into force on 2 December 1990. But even before the first election of judges for the newly established court, scheduled for 21 February 1991, the law had to be amended. The main reason for this were the rules on the compensation of the court's judges which were deemed to be unreasonably generous.

On 26 March 1992, the Abgeordnetenhaus of Berlin finally elected the first nine judges of the court and on 21 May 1992 the newly established court rendered its first decision. Klaus Finkelnburg was elected to serve as the court's first president and Ehrhart Körting was chosen as its first vice-president.

From 2007 to 2012, a woman headed the court for the first time – Margret Diwell.

=== Major decisions ===
The decision of 12 January 1993 (VerfGH 55/92), (Note: Available online at openJur 2012, 682.) that the prosecution of Erich Honecker, the former Chairman of the State Council of East Germany, was incompatible with human dignity as enshrined in Article 1 of the Basic Law for the Federal Republic of Germany due to his state of health, caused considerable controversy.

On 16 November 2022 (VerfGH 154/21), (Note: Available online at Berliner Vorschriften- und Rechtsprechungsdatenbank) the court declared the 2021 Berlin state election void and ordered a repeat election within 90 days due to "serious systematic deficiencies in the preparation" of the 2021 election. The repeat election happened on the last possible Sunday within this 90 days-period, thus on 12 February 2023. The annulment of the election was the first court-ordered voidance of a German state election since the 1991 Hamburg state election.

== Composition and judges ==
=== Composition and election ===
The Constitutional Court of the State of Berlin is composed of nine judges including its president and vice-president (Article 84(1) Constitution of Berlin). Three of the nine judges must be professional judges (Berufsrichter) and three others must be qualified to hold judicial office (Befähigung zum Richteramt). All judges are elected by the Abgeordnetenhaus of Berlin with a two-thirds majority (Article 84(1) Constitution of Berlin) for a seven-year term without the possibility of re-election.

Only persons who have reached the age of 35 and are eligible for election to the Bundestag may serve as judges of the court. Men and women must each make up at least three of the Constitutional Court judges. All judges serve in an honorary capacity and only receive a small reimbursement.

=== Presidents ===
President		Tenure (as justice)	Tenure (as president)	Tenure length (as president)	Proposal	Ref.
1	Klaus Finkelnburg	March 1992 – March 2000	March 1992 – March 2000	8 years	CDU	
2	Helge Sodan	March 2000 – April 2007	March 2000 – April 2007	7 years, 1 month	CDU	
3	Margret Diwel	June 2004 – March 2012	April 2007 – March 2012	4 years, 11 month	SPD	
4	Sabine Schudoma	March 2012 – 31 October 2019	8 March 2012 – 31 October 2019	7 years, 237 days	SPD	
5	Ludgera Selting	November 2019 – Incumbent	November 2019 – Incumbent	Incumbent	SPD	

=== Vice-Presidents ===
Vice-President		Tenure (as justice)	Tenure (as vice-president)	Tenure length (as vice-president)	Proposal	Ref.
1	Ehrhart Körting	March 1992 – March 1997	March 1992 – March 1997	5 years	SPD	
2	Ulrich Storost	May 1997 – June 2004	May 1997 – June 2004	7 years, 1 month	SPD	
3	Margret Diwel	June 2004 – March 2012	June 2004 – April 2007	2 years, 10 month	SPD	
4	Michael Hund	April 2007 – July 2014	April 2007 – July 2014	7 years, 3 month	CDU	
5	Robert Seegmüller	July 2014 – July 2024	July 2014 – July 2024	10 years	CDU	
6	Björn Retzlaff	July 2024	July 2024 – Incumbent	Incumbent	CDU, SPD, Greens, The Left	
