= State Constitutional Court of Schleswig-Holstein =

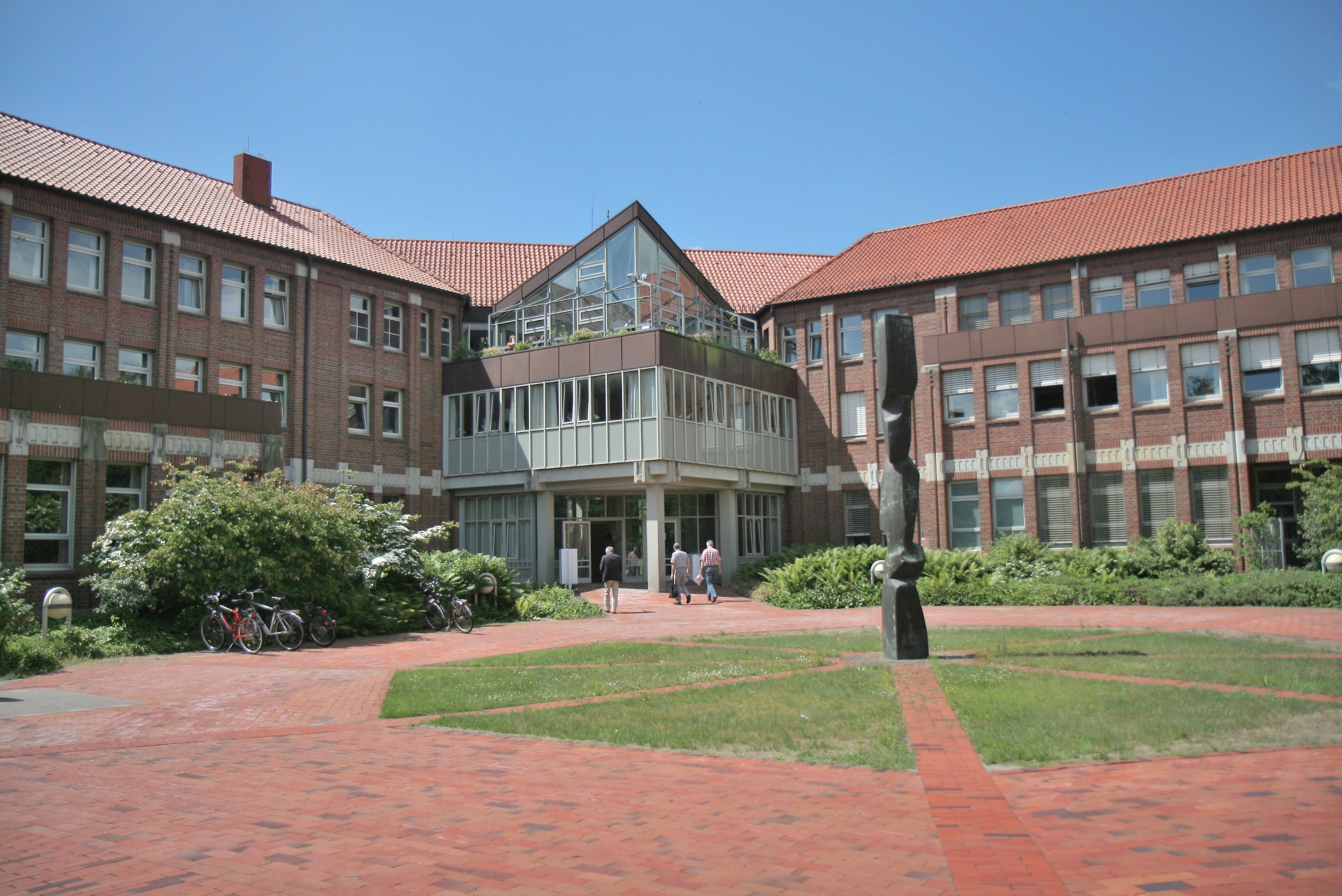
Courthouse

The State Constitutional Court of Schleswig-Holstein is the state constitutional jurisdiction of the state of Schleswig-Holstein, established on 1 May 2008. It is based in Schleswig.

== History and constitutional basis ==
Until 2008, Schleswig-Holstein was the only German state that did not have its own constitutional jurisdiction. Instead, disputes concerning state constitutional law were to be referred to the Federal Constitutional Court in accordance with Article 51 of the state constitution in conjunction with Article 99 of the Basic Law.

After the constitutional reform of 1990 continued to dispense with a separate state constitutional court, the discussion about it came up again and again. For example, in November 2004 the Schleswig-Holstein state parliament again discussed the establishment of a state constitutional court. Reasons for this consideration include, for example, that even decisions on the admissibility of popular initiatives are only made years after they have been voted on in the state parliament, often in the next electoral term. With effect from October 27, 2006, the state constitution was amended; Article 44, Paragraph 1 now provides for a state constitutional court. This requirement was implemented with the adoption of a State Constitutional Court Act.

== Responsibilities ==
The tasks of the State Constitutional Court are regulated in Article 51 of the State Constitution. According to this, the State Constitutional Court is responsible for disputes between organs, judicial review proceedings, local constitutional complaints and complaints against election review decisions. There are still no state constitutional complaints by individuals, although the basic rights of the Basic Law have been incorporated into the state constitution across the board (Article 2a).

== Election and composition ==
The seven members of the State Constitutional Court work part-time. They must be qualified to hold judicial office and are elected by the State Parliament by a two-thirds majority in accordance with Section 6 Paragraph 1 of the State Constitutional Court Act for twelve years each (in the first election pursuant to Article 68, four members for nine years and three members for six years). The members of the State Constitutional Court receive an expense allowance of one-fifteenth of the monthly basic salary of salary group R 9, rounded up to the nearest ten euros, for each month in which they attend at least one meeting or decision-making session. Members of the Constitutional Court were in April 2019:

- President: Bernhard Flor (Regional Court of Itzehoe), personal deputy: Carsten Löbbert (District Court of Lübeck)
- Vice President: Christoph Brüning (Kiel University), personal deputy: Jutta Lewin-Fries (Schleswig-Holstein State Social Court)
- Ulrike Hillmann (Kiel Regional Court), personal deputy: Ole Krönert (Lübeck Regional Court)
- Nele Matz-Lück (Kiel University), personal deputy: Ulf Hellmann-Sieg (lawyer, Hamburg)
- Achim Theis (Schleswig-Holstein Administrative Court), personal deputy: Arno Witt (lawyer, Kiel)
- Maren Thomsen (Schleswig-Holstein Higher Administrative Court), personal deputy: Susanne Rublack (Federal Administrative Court)
- Felix Welti (University of Kassel), personal deputy: Uwe Jensen (LA, Borgwedel)

In March 2021, the court consisted of:

- President: Christoph Brüning (Kiel University), personal deputy: Oswald Kleiner, lawyer and notary
- Vice President: Christine Fuchsloch President of the Schleswig-Holstein State Social Court, personal deputy: Carsten Löbbert, President of the Lübeck District Court
- Nele Matz-Lück (Kiel University), personal deputy: Ulf Hellmann-Sieg (lawyer, Hamburg)
- Nele Matz-Lück (Kiel University), personal deputy: Ulf Hellmann-SiAchim Theis (Schleswig-Holstein Administrative Court), personal deputy: Holger Bruhn, presiding judge at the Schleswig-Holstein Higher Administrative Court (RA, Hamburg)
- Frank Guido Rose, Director of the Ratzeburg District Court, personal deputy: Christiane Schmaltz, Judge at the Federal Court of Justice
- Sabine Wudtke, Vice President of the Regional Court of Itzehoe, personal deputy: Silke Reimer, lawyer and notary
- Silke Schneider, President of the Lübeck Regional Court, personal deputy: Marc Petit, Presiding Judge at the Lübeck Regional Court

== Location of the seat ==
Lübeck had applied for the seat of the court, citing its centuries-long tradition as a renowned supra-regional court of the Higher Court of Lübeck and the subsequent Higher Appeal Court of the Four Free Cities. However, after a cost-benefit analysis, the Schleswig-Holstein Justice Center Schleswig was awarded the contract, where the Higher Regional Court, the Schleswig-Holstein Administrative Court, the Higher Administrative Court and the State Social Court are already located.

== See also ==
- Constitution of the State of Schleswig-Holstein

== Literature ==
- Friedrich, Thomas: Von Wikingern, Amtshaftung und Verfassungsgerichten, in: NVwZ 1998, 1273.
- Friedrich, Thomas: Ein Landesverfassungsgericht für Schleswig-Holstein? in: SchlHA 1997, 198.
- "Internetpräsenz des Schleswig-Holsteinischen Landesverfassungsgerichts".
- "Übersicht der Rechtsprechung des Schleswig-Holsteinischen Landesverfassungsgerichts".
