= Constitutional Council =

Constitutional Council might refer to:

- Constitutional Council (Algeria)
- Constitutional Council (Cambodia)
- Constitutional Council (Chad)
- Constitutional Council (Chile)
- Constitutional Council (France)
- Constitutional Council (Ivory Coast)
- Constitutional Council (Kazakhstan)
- Constitutional Council (Lebanon)
- Constitutional Council (Mozambique)
- Constitutional Council (Sahrawi Arab Democratic Republic)
- Constitutional Council (Sri Lanka)
- Constitutional Council (Nepal)

== See also ==
- Constitutional court
