= Constitution of Thuringia =

German state constitution

The Constitution of the Free State of Thuringia is the state constitution of Thuringia; it is valid in this federal state together with the Basic Law of the Federal Republic of Germany.

Violations of the Thuringian Constitution can be asserted before the Thuringian Constitutional Court.

== Origin ==
The state of Thuringia had initially given itself a provisional state statute until a constitution came into force. This was neither a provision of constitutional rank nor statutory law, but a formal (parliamentary) law. The provisional state statute was passed by the members of the state parliament on 7 November 1990 and published in the first law gazette for the state of Thuringia. In addition, the text of the law was posted in the state parliament and the administrative authorities of the districts and read out on the radio.

The state statute stipulated that it would only be valid for a limited period of time and that it would expire no later than 31 December 1992. Originally, constitutional consultations were planned for this period. In fact, this process lasted until October 1993. An amending law was passed on December 15, 1992, to extend the validity of the state statute beyond December 31, 1992. The clause specifying the deadline was replaced by a more vague formulation: "This law [the Provisional State Statute] shall cease to apply [only] upon the entry into force of the Constitution of the State of Thuringia."

On October 25, 1993, the members of the state parliament passed the new state constitution. This did not take place in the state capital Erfurt, but at the Wartburg near Eisenach. Four days later, the Law and Ordinance Gazette was published, which contained the full text of the constitution on 14 pages. The new constitution was thus proclaimed.

It was planned that the constitution would come into force on the day after its proclamation - but initially only provisionally. Article 106, paragraph 2 explicitly stated that "This constitution shall come into force provisionally on the day after its proclamation." In addition, however, a referendum was to be held: the population was to vote on whether to finally put the text, which the state parliament had passed with a large majority, into force. A simple majority was to be decisive. And in the event that this majority was not achieved, it was planned that the Provisional State Statute would temporarily come into force again.

It was planned that the constitution would come into force on the day after its proclamation - but initially only provisionally. Article 106, paragraph 2 explicitly stated that "This constitution shall come into force provisionally on the day after its proclamation." In addition, however, a referendum was to be held: the population was to vote on whether to finally put the text, which the state parliament had passed with a large majority, into force. A simple majority was to be decisive. And in the event that this majority was not achieved, it was planned that the Provisional State Statute would temporarily come into force again.

== Content of the state constitution ==
According to Article 44 of the Constitution, the Free State is a democratic, social and constitutional state committed to the protection of the natural foundations of life.

In addition to its own catalogue of fundamental rights and extensive provisions on state objectives, the constitution contains provisions in particular on the constitutional bodies of the Thuringian State Parliament, the Thuringian State Government and the Thuringian Constitutional Court. Legislation by the State Parliament or by popular initiative and referendum is provided for. The constitution contains its own eternity clause in Article 83 paragraph 3

== Literature ==
- Carl-Christian Dressel, Thomas Poschmann (Hrsg.): Die Verfassung des Freistaates Thüringen. Kommentar. 2 Bände. Berliner Wissenschafts-Verlag, Stuttgart 2024, ISBN 978-3-8305-5551-3.
- Manfred Baldus, Joachim Linck, Joachim Lindner, Holger Poppenhäger, Matthias Ruffert (Hrsg.): Die Verfassung des Freistaats Thüringen. Handkommentar. Nomos, Baden-Baden 2013, ISBN 978-3-8329-7245-5.
  - 2. Auflage: Michael Brenner, Klaus Hinkel, Jörg Hopfe, Holger Poppenhäger, Klaus von der Weiden (Hrsg.): Die Verfassung des Freistaats Thüringen. Handkommentar. Nomos, Baden-Baden 2023, ISBN 978-3-7560-0075-3.
- Peter M. Huber: Entwicklung des Landesverfassungsrechts in Thüringen. In: JöR. Neue Folge, Bd. 52, 2004, S. 323–345.
- Steffen Raßloff: Geschichte Thüringens. Beck, München 2010, ISBN 978-3-406-60523-9.
