= Constitutional Court of Saarland =

The Constitutional Court of Saarland (also Saarland Constitutional Court) is the constitutional court of the German state of Saarland. The court also has the special status of a constitutional body (see: Constitution of Saarland). According to the Constitution of December 15, 1947, the Constitutional Court of Saarland is the third organ of the will of the people alongside the state parliament and the state government (Article 97 SVerf). The detailed regulations on the Constitutional Court are set out in the Law on the Constitutional Court.

The seat of the Constitutional Court is Saarbrücken.

== Composition and election ==
The Constitutional Court is made up of eight judges. Each of these eight judges is assigned a deputy. The judges and their respective deputies are elected for a term of six years by a two-thirds majority of the statutory number of members of the state parliament. Re-election is possible. There are certain requirements that a member of the Constitutional Court must fulfill: they must be a German citizen and eligible for election to the state parliament, be at least 35 years old and have the qualifications to hold judicial office or to hold a higher administrative service. At least two members and their deputies must be professional judges and belong to a higher regional court.

== Administration ==
The administration is carried out by the President.

== Duties ==
The Constitutional Court decides:

- on the compatibility of a state law with the constitution (abstract and concrete normative controls)
- on disputes between organs
- on constitutional complaints
- on challenges to certain decisions of the state parliament or the state government regarding popular initiatives and referendums
- on election and mandate checks on charges against members of the government and on other matters mentioned in the Constitutional Court Act.

== History ==
The Constitutional Court had been planned since the Constitution of Saarland came into force in 1947, but at that time it had very limited powers. The actual tasks of a constitutional court lay with the Constitutional Commission, which was created on the model of France. So the Constitutional Court initially only existed on paper. Only after the referendum on the Saar Statute on October 23, 1955, which rejected it and paved the way for the political and economic integration of the Saarland into the Federal Republic, was a comprehensive constitutional amendment passed in December 1956, transferring the previous powers of the Constitutional Commission to the Constitutional Court. It began its work in January 1959 with the election of its members and its president in February 1959.

== Judgements ==
- Contact tracing had t be revived in (August 2020).
- Raw measurement data must be produced to be used as evidence
- The 3-member AfD parliamentary group is not entitled to additional financing from the state parliament

== Members ==
=== Presidents since 1959 ===
| # | Name | Amtszeit | Weiteres Amt |
|---|---|---|---|
| 1 | Erich Lawall | 1959–1964 | President of the Higher Regional Court of Saarbrücken |
| 2 | Hans Oehlenschläger | 1964–1966 | President of the Higher Administrative Court of Saarland |
| 3 | Rolf Best | 1966–1971 | President of the Higher Regional Court of Saarbrücken |
| 4 | Philipp Marzen | 1971–1974 | President of the Higher Administrative Court of Saarland |
| 5 | Wilhelm Gehrlein | 1974–1985 | President of the Higher Regional Court of Saarbrücken |
| 6 | Horst Hilpert | 1986–1995 | President of the Saarland State Labour Court |
| 7 | Roland Rixecker | since 1995 | President of the Saarland Higher Regional Court |

=== Current members ===
| Members | | | Deputy | | |
| Name | Term in office | Other offices held | Name | Term in office | Other offices held |
|---|---|---|---|---|---|
| Roland Rixecker (President) | until 15 Juliy2026 | Former President of the Higher Regional Court | Christoph Schmit | until 7 December 2028 | Presiding Judge at the Administrative Court |
| Rudolf Wendt (Vice president) | until 15 July 2026 | University professor | Alma Abegg | until 17 November 2027 | Lawyer |
| Roberto Bartone | until 12 June 2024 | Judge at the Finance Court | Steffen Dick | until 17 November 2027 | President of the State Social Court |
| Anna-Catharina Marsch | until 16 February 2029 | Judge at the Finance Court | Michaela Treese | until 14 February 2029 | Legal Secretary |
| Claudia Witsch | until 17 November 2027 | Judge at the Administrative Court | Annemarie Matusche-Beckmann | until 19 Juni 2024 | University professor |
| Renate Trenz | until 15.Juli 2026 | Judge at the Administrative Court | Thomas Caspar | until 18 April 2029 | District Court Judge |
| Hans-Georg Warken | until 15.July 2026 | Lawyer | Markus Groß | until 19 June 2024 | Lawyer |
| Hans-Peter Freymann | until 17 November 2027 | President of the Higher Regional Court | Karl-Werner Dörr | until 13 September 2028 | President of the State Labour Court |

== Literature ==
- Werner Thieme: Die Entwicklung des Verfassungsrechts im Saarland von 1945 bis 1958. In: Jahrbuch des Öffentlichen Rechts der Gegenwart. Neue Folge / Bd. 9, 1960, S. 432–462.
