= Constitutional Council (Sahrawi Arab Democratic Republic) =

National constitutional court

- المجلس الدستوري; Consejo Constitucional
- Jurisdiction: Sahrawi Arab Democratic Republic
- Composition method: President of the Constitutional Council and 2 members are appointed by the President of the Sahrawi Arab Democratic Republic, 2 members by the Sahrawi National Council, 2 members by the Supreme Council of Justice

President of the Constitutional Council
- Currently: Mohamed Bouzid Mezine
- Since: 10 August 2023

The Constitutional Council (Arabic: المجلس الدستوري) is a judicial body in the government of the Sahrawi Arab Democratic Republic. It is composed of six members and a president, each two are appointed by the Sahrawi National Council, the Supreme Council of Justice, and the President of the Sahrawi Arab Democratic Republic, the latter of whom appoints the president of the council.

== Current members ==
Members of the Constitutional Council of the Sahrawi Arab Democratic Republic
Name	Position	Term	Appointed by
Mohamed Bouzid Mezine	President	2023–26	Brahim Ghali
Abbih Salahi Babaha	Member	2023–26	Brahim Ghali
Mamouni Abdullah Al-Daf	Member	2023–26	Brahim Ghali
Mohamed Saleh Al-Bashir	Member	2023–26	Brahim Ghali
Al-Mahfoud Mohamed Al-Salek	Member	2023–26	Brahim Ghali
Al-Hassan Saad Bouh Sanad	Member	2023–26	Brahim Ghali
Brahim Mohamed Ambarek	Member	2023–26	Brahim Ghali

Members of the Constitutional Council are granted immunity while performing their duties and cannot face prosecution or arrest except in the event of a severe criminal offense. Their immunity is lifted through an explicit request from the Minister of Justice, approved by the president of the council. In the case of the president, the consent of the President of the Republic is required.

== See also ==
- Supreme Court of the Sahrawi Arab Democratic Republic

== Bibliography ==
- "The Constitution of the Sahrawi Arab Democratic Republic" (PDF). policingla.info. Pretoria, South Africa: Human Rights Centre of the University of Pretoria. 20 December 2015. Archived (PDF) from the original on 16 November 2021.
