= Supreme Court of the Sahrawi Arab Democratic Republic =

Highest court of appeal in the Sahrawi Arab Democratic Republic

- المحكمة العليا للجمهورية العربية الصحراوية الديمقراطية
- Jurisdiction: Sahrawi Arab Democratic Republic
- Composition method: Appointed by the President on the recommendation of the Minister of Justice

President of the Supreme Court
- Currently: Hamdi Jalili
- Since: 14 April 2024

The Supreme Court of the Sahrawi Arab Democratic Republic (Arabic: المحكمة العليا للجمهورية العربية الصحراوية الديمقراطية) is the highest court of appeal in the Sahrawi Arab Democratic Republic. It is one of three courts within the judiciary of the SADR, along with the Court of First Instance and the Court of Appeal.

According to the Constitution, its president is a judge appointed by the President of the Sahrawi Arab Democratic Republic on the recommendation of the Minister of Justice. The current president is Hamdi Jalili.
