= Thuringian Constitutional Court =

German state constitutional court

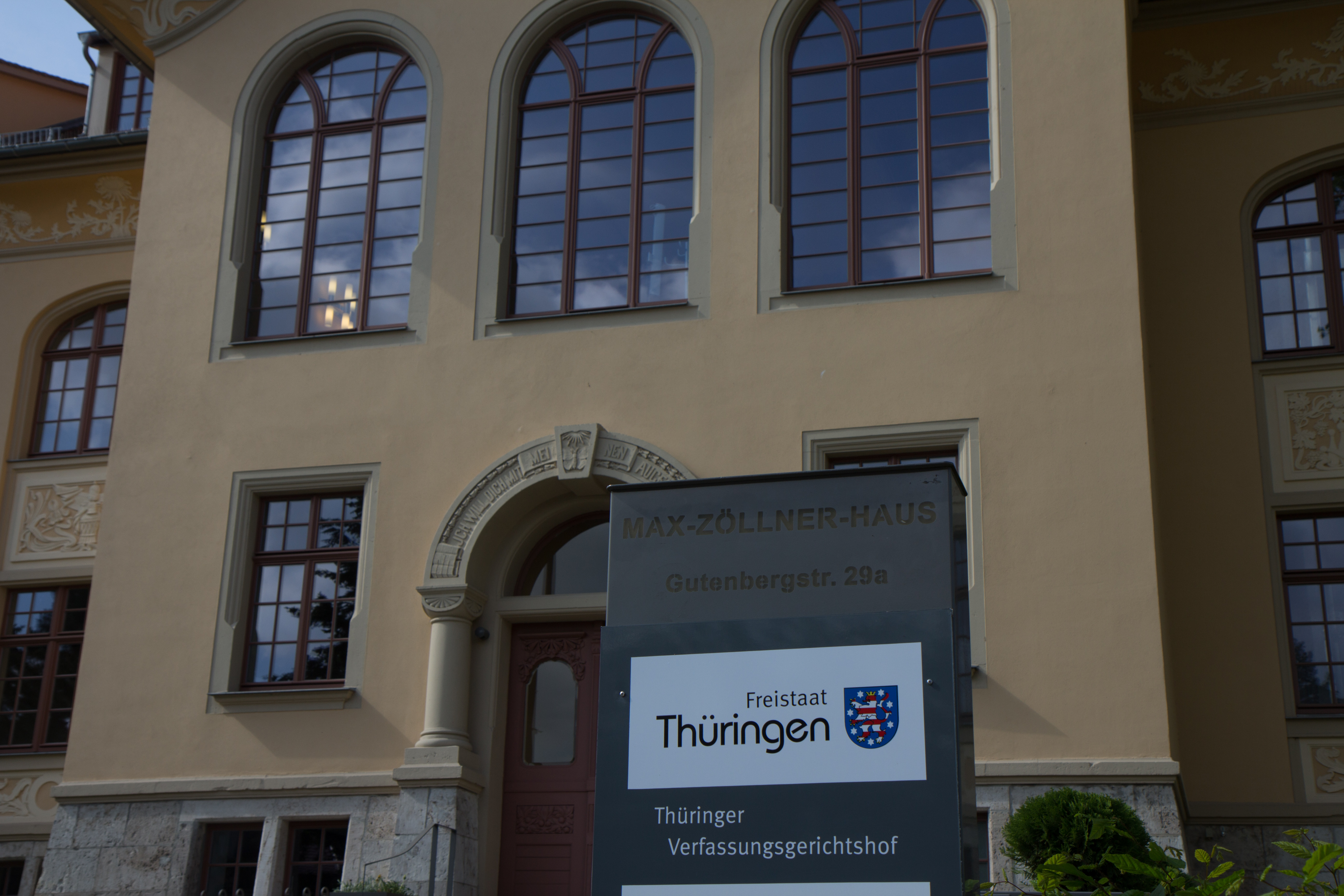
Building with the courtroom of the Constitutional Court in Weimar

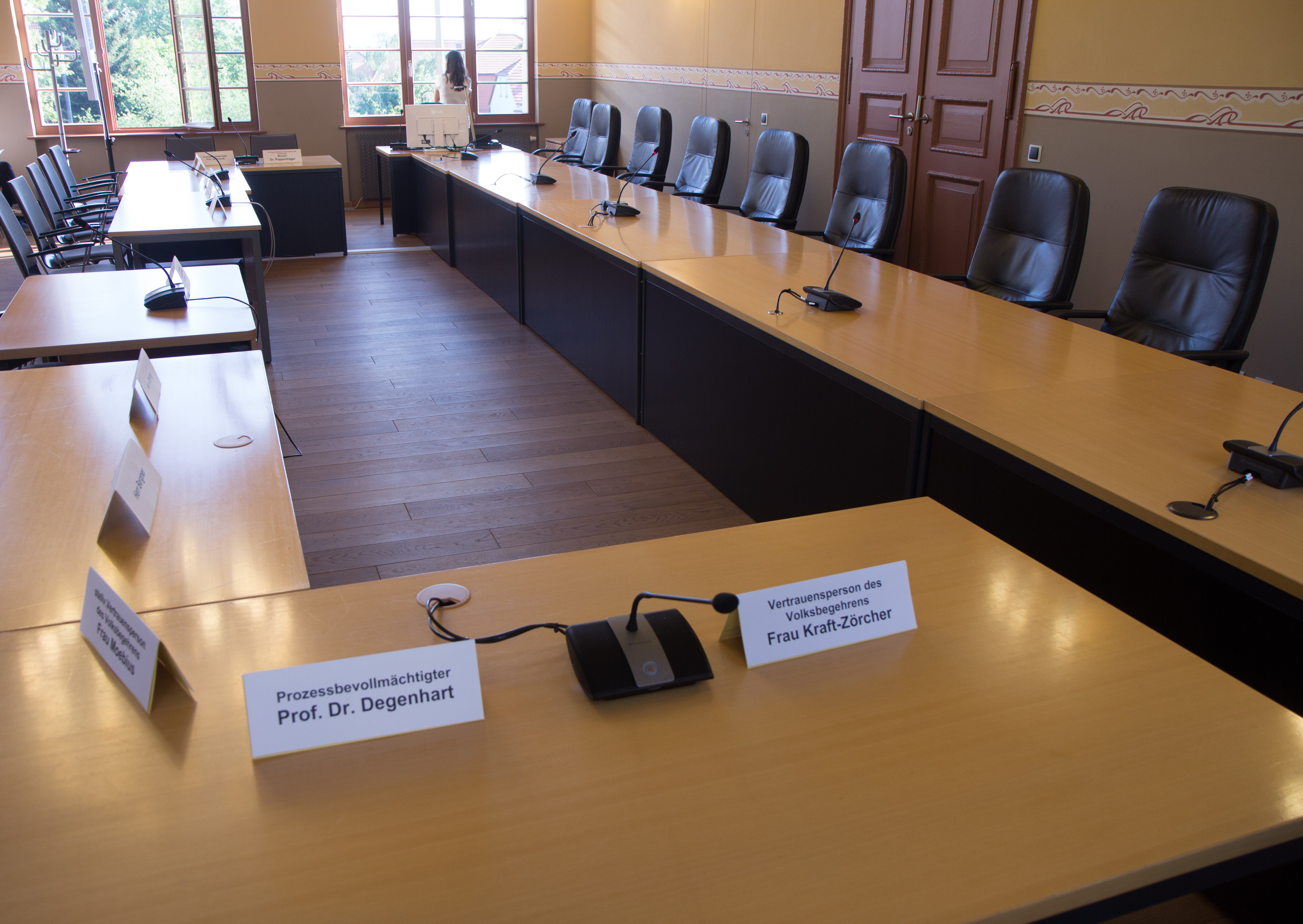
Judge's bench

The Thuringian Constitutional Court (short: ThürVerfGH) is the state constitutional court of the Free State of Thuringia. The court is located in Weimar at Jenaer Straße 2a, and oral hearings take place at Gutenbergstraße 29a.

== History ==
The Constitution of the Free State of Thuringia of October 25, 1993, provided for a Constitutional Court. The Thuringian State Parliament passed the Law on the Thuringian Constitutional Court on June 28, 1994, thereby determining the seat of the Constitutional Court to be in Weimar. It began its work about a year later, on September 13, 1995. In March 2018, the President of the Constitutional Court, Manfred Aschke, left office upon reaching the age limit. However, the parliamentary groups in the Thuringian state parliament were unable to agree on a successor. The latter must be elected by the state parliament with a two-thirds majority. The government factions favored constitutional judge Elke Heßelmann, while the CDU faction favored constitutional judge Klaus-Dieter von der Weiden. The state parliament therefore failed to hold the election on time in accordance with Section 3 Paragraph 3 Clause 3 of the Thuringian Constitutional Court Act. As a result, the position of president was vacant until further notice and the court only had a temporary quorum. The court had already determined during a brief vacancy in 2010 that the court could only have a temporary quorum. During the vacancy, the CDU favorite Klaus-Dieter von der Weiden represented the office of president. In May 2018, it was announced that CDU parliamentary group leader Mike Mohring was considering Stefan Kaufmann, President of the Thuringian Higher Regional Court, as a compromise candidate. However, there was a risk that no new president would be elected before the summer break and that the court would therefore lose its ability to act. Most recently, the Left Party also decided to support Kaufmann. The election proposal was finally supported by Alliance 90/The Greens and the SPD. With Kaufmann's departure, the presidency became vacant again because a successor was not elected within the deadline.

In 2021/2022 the vacancy was repeated and Klaus von der Weiden again headed the Court. In the summer of 2022, the Thuringian legislature amended the Constitutional Court Act and introduced the office of Vice President of the Court.

=== President ===
- 1995–2000: Gunter Becker, President of the Thuingia State Social Court
- 2000–2005: Hans-Joachim Bauer (* 1941), President of the Thuringian Higher Regional Court
- 2005–2010: Harald Graef (* 1942), Vizepräsident des Thüringer Oberverwaltungsgericht
- Vacant during April/May 2010
- 2010–2014: Joachim Lindner (* 1946), Vice President of the Thuringian Higher Administrative Court
- 2014–2018: Manfred Aschke (1950–2023), Presiding Judge at the Thuringian Higher Administrative Court
- Vacant from March 2018 until Juni 2018 (Acting: Klaus von der Weiden)
- 2018–2021: Stefan Kaufmann (* 1953), President of the Thuringian Higher Regional Court
- Vacant from December 2021 until May 2022 (Acting: Klaus von der Weiden)
- since 2022 Klaus-Dieter von der Weiden

== Legal basis and choice ==
Articles 79 and 80 of the Constitution of Thuringia regulate the position, composition and jurisdiction of the Constitutional Court. These regulations are further defined in the Law on the Thuringian Constitutional Court. The working methods of the Court are regulated in the Rules of Procedure of the Thuringian Constitutional Court.

Until 2014, the president and the eight other members of the court were elected by the Thuringian Landtag with a two-thirds majority for five years. In 2014, the term of office was increased to seven years, with only one re-election possible. This reduced the maximum term of office to 14 years. However, a transitional regulation allowed judges who had already been elected as constitutional judges several times to be elected as constitutional judges again. This enabled the re-election of judges Manfred Baldus, Walter Bayer and Hartmut Schwan. The president and two other members must be professional judges, and three other members must be qualified to hold judicial office. The court is made up primarily of lawyers.

== Members ==
=== Current composition ===
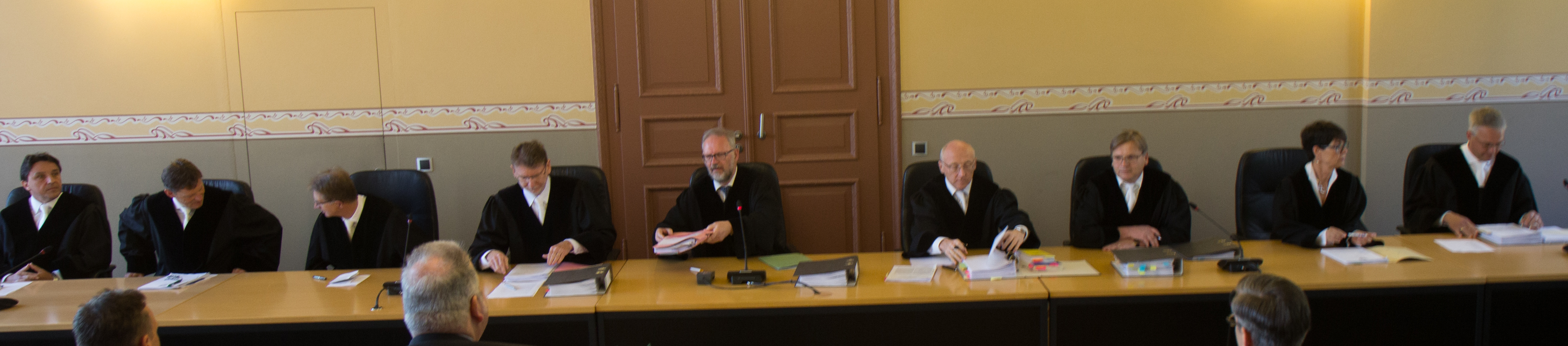
The members of the Constitutional Court at the beginning of the oral hearing on 14 June 2017 in Weimar (from left to right: Menzel, Petermann, Schwan, Bayer, Aschke, Baldus, von der Weiden, Heßelmann, Ohler)

- President: Klaus-Dieter von der Weiden (* 1962), Richter am Bundesverwaltungsgericht (2022–2029)
- Professional judges
  - Lars Schmidt, Presiding Judge at the Regional Court of Erfurt (Vice President: 2022–2029)
  - Barbara Burkert, Presiding Judge at the Regional Court of Mühlhausen (2022–2029)
- Members qualified to hold judicial office
  - Anika Klafki (* 1986), University professor at the University of Jena (2022–2029)
  - Klaus Hinkel (* 1963), President of the Thuringian Higher Administrative Court (2019–2026)
- Other members
  - Jörg Geibert, Rechtsanwalt (2022–2029)
  - Christoph Ohler (* 1967), Universitätsprofessor an der Friedrich-Schiller-Universität Jena (2015–2029)
  - Jens Petermann (* 1963), Richter am Sozialgericht Gotha (2015–2029)
  - Renate Wittmann (* 1969), Richterin am Arbeitsgericht Nürnberg (2022–2029)

=== Deputy members ===
- Professional judges
  - Ute Jung, Judge at the Higher Administrative Court (2017–2031)
  - Anja Klameth, Judge at the Regional Court of Erfurt (2022–2029)
  - Dr. René Kliebisch, Vorsitzender Judge at the Regional Court of Mühlhausen (2022–2029)
  - Michael Obhues, President of the Administrative Court of Gera (2008–2025)
  - Claus Eckart Peters, Judge at the Higher Administrative Court of Weimar (2010–2029)
  - Petra Reiser-Uhlenbruch, Judge at the District Court of Gotha (2011–2030)
- Members qualified to hold judicial office
  - Wolfgang Weißkopf, Attorney at Law (2003–2025)
- Other members
  - Kjell Eberhardt, state secretary (2012–2029)
  - Renate Licht, Regionsgeschäftsführerin Director DGB, Thuringia Region (2011–2030)

=== Former members (selection) ===
- Brigitte Baki, Trade unionist, deputy member 2005–2011
- Manfred Baldus, university professor at the an der University of Erfurt, Member 2008–2021 (elected until 2025), deputy member 2005 to 2008
- Walter Bayer (* 1956), University Professor at the Friedrich Schiller University of Jena
- Erhard Denninger, Constitutional law professor, member 1995–2000
- Michael Menzel, Rechtsanwalt (2015–2022)
- Renate Hemsteg von Fintel, Gewerkschafterin, stellvertretendes member 1995–2005
- Elke Heßelmann (* 1958), President des Administrative Court Weimar
- Evelin Groß, Politician, deputy member 2010–2012
- Martina Hornstein-Engers, Deputy Member 2005–2010
- Johanna Hübscher, German Professor Emeritus of Sports Medicine, member 2000–2010
- Christiane Kretschmer, Diplomingenieurin, stellvertretendes Mitglied 1995–2000
- Iris Martin-Gehl, Rechtsanwältin, Mitglied 2000–2015
- Karl-Ulrich Meyn, Staatsrechtslehrer, Mitglied 2005–2007, Stellvertreter 1995–2000
- Gertrud Neuwirth, President of the Regional Court of Meiningen, Member, 1995–2000
- Petra Pollak, lawyer, member
- Ulrich Rommelfanger, lawyer 1995–2000
- Matthias Ruffert, Constitutional law professor and judge at the Thuringian Higher Administrative Court, member 2010–2015
- Manfred Scherer, President of the Regional Court of Erfurt, member 1996–1999
- Hartmut Schwan, President of the Thuringian Higher Administrative Court, member 2005–2019; deputy 1995–2005
- Rudolf Steinberg, Constitutional law professor, member 1995–2000

== Types of procedures ==
The court decides on

1. Individual constitutional complaints,
2. Municipal constitutional complaints
3. Disputes between organs of the state
4. abstract judicial review applications at the request of one fifth of the members of the State Parliament, a parliamentary group or the State Government
5. concrete applications for judicial review of legality
6. Admissibility of referendums,
7. Constitutionality of investigative mandates to a committee of inquiry,
8. Electoral complaints regarding the state elections

== Literature ==
- Sebastian von Ammon: Die Urteilsverfassungsbeschwerde zum Thüringer Verfassungsgerichtshof, in: Thüringer Verwaltungsblätter (ThürVBl.), Bd. 23 (2014), S. 181–185.
- Hans-Joachim Bauer: Der Thüringer Verfassungsgerichtshof, in: Landes- und Kommunalverwaltung (LKV), 1996, S. 385–388.
- Hans-Joachim Bauer: Die Rechtsprechung des Thüringer Verfassungsgerichtshofs zum Parlamentsrecht (1996 bis 2003), in: Zehn Jahre Thüringer Landesverfassung (1993–2003), Wartburg-Verlag, Weimar 2003, S. 125–135.
- Lukas C. Gundling: Zur Frage der Funktionsfähigkeit des Thüringer Verfassungsgerichthofes beim altersbedingten Ausscheiden des Präsidenten. In: Zeitschrift für Landesverfassungsrecht und Landesverwaltungsrecht (ZLVR), Bd. 3 (2022), S. 103–108 (online).
- Lukas C. Gundling: Verfassungskrise in Thüringen abgewendet. Ein kurzer Bericht, in: Zeitschrift für Landesverfassungsrecht und Landesverwaltungsrecht (ZLVR), Bd. 3 (2018), S. 105–108 (Digitalisat online).
- Oliver W. Lembcke: Thüringer Verfassungsgerichtshof, in: Werner Reutter (Hrsg.): Landesverfassungsgerichte. Entwicklung – Aufbau – Funktionen, Springer, Wiesbaden 2017, ISBN 978-3-658-16093-7, S. 389–420.
- Julia Plattner: Das parlamentarische Untersuchungsverfahren vor dem Verfassungsgericht. Eine Betrachtung zum Rechtsschutz vor und nach dem Erlaß des Gesetzes zur Regelung des Rechts der Untersuchungsausschüsse des Deutschen Bundestages (PUAG) und in Thüringen, Duncker & Humblot, Berlin 2004, ISBN 3-428-11221-0.
- Werner Reutter: Richterinnen und Richter am Thüringer Verfassungsgerichtshof, in: LKV 2019, S. 496–501 (Digitalisat).
- Hartmut Schwan: Der Thüringer Verfassungsgerichtshof als „außerplanmäßige Revisionsinstanz“, in: ThürVBl., Bd. 21 (2012), S. 121–129.
- Dietrich Stöffler: Die Rechtsprechung des Thüringer Verfassungsgerichtshofs zum Kommunalrecht, in: Zehn Jahre Thüringer Landesverfassung (1993–2003), Wartburg-Verlag, Weimar 2003, S. 107–123.
- Klaus-Dieter von der Weiden: Funktionsunfähigkeit des Thüringer Verfassungsgerichtshofs bei verzögerter Nachwahl eines altersbedingt ausgeschiedenen Mitglieds?, in: ThürVBl., Bd. 28 (2019), S. 209–214.
