= Hildegund Holzheid =

German legal scholar (born 1936)

Hildegund Holzheid (born 31 October 1936 in Nuremberg) is a German legal scholar. After the Second State Law Examination in 1962, she worked in Bavaria as a prosecutor and criminal judge at the district court, as a clerk at the Bavarian Ministry of Justice and as a civil judge at the Higher Regional Court of Munich, whose president she became in 1992. She was a member of different commissions, councils, like German Ethics Council, Bavarian Bioethics Commission, etc.
