= Hans-Joachim Hessler =

German composer, musician, and musicologist

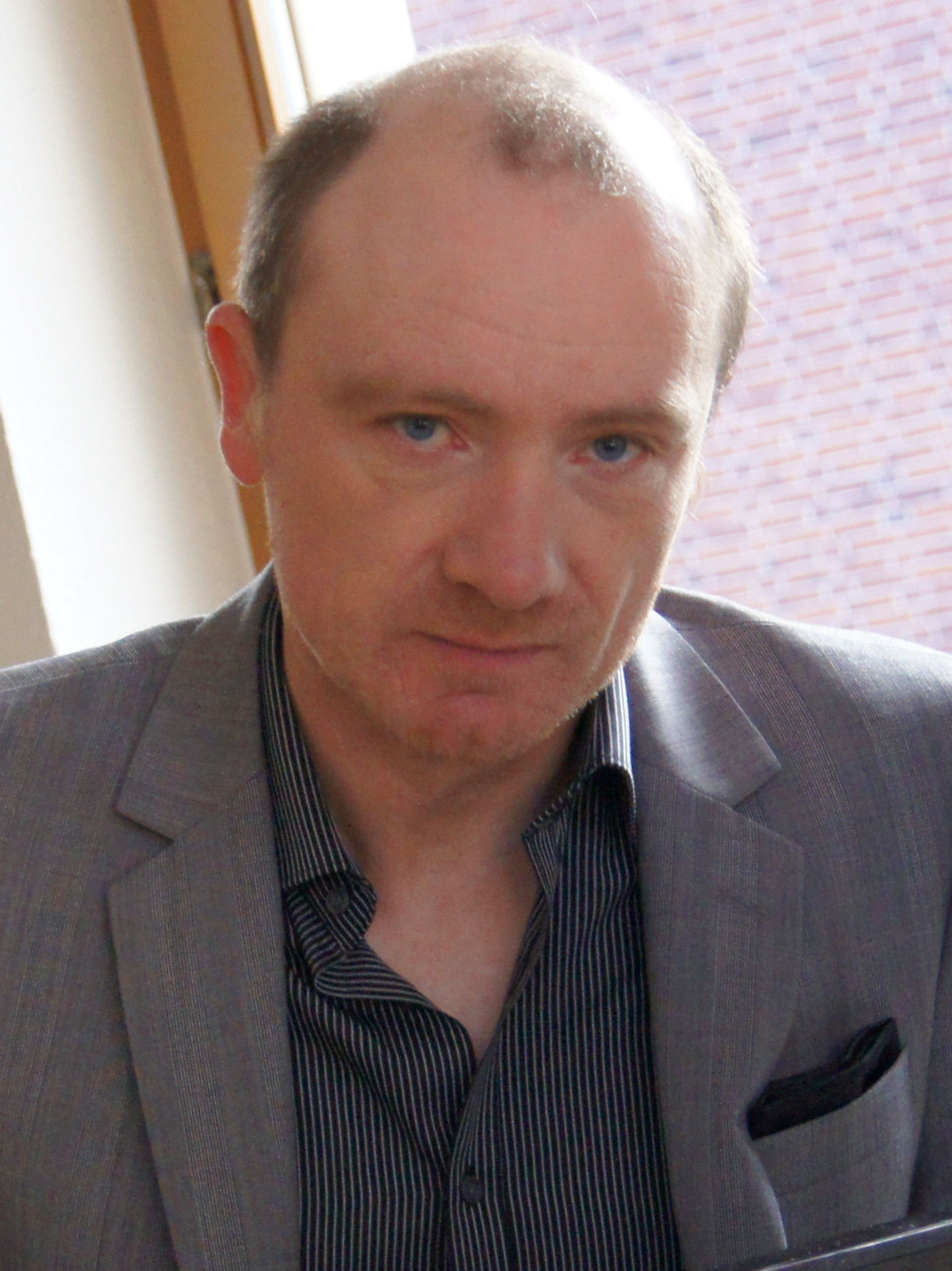
Hans-Joachim Hessler in 2012

Hans-Joachim Hessler (German: Heßler, born 7 January 1968 in Recklinghausen) is a German composer, musician and musicologist. Today, he lives in Duisburg and Diemelsee. As a contemporary composer, he attributes his work in writing and composition to the epoch of musical postmodernism.

== Life ==
He studied music theory at the University of Münster and then, from 1990 to 1997, school music and German literature at today's Technical University of Dortmund. He received his education in art from, among others, Werner Seiss and Bob Degen, in the organ from, among others, Karl Weyers and Thomas Gabriel, and in composition from, among others, Heribert Buchholz and Thomas Stanko. In 2008, he received the academic degree of Doctor of Philosophy from the University of Music and Performing Arts, Graz.

== Work ==
Poly-stylistics and boundary crossings of all kinds are a fundamental attribute of Hessler's work.

Much of Hessler's work appears to be influenced by the philosophical writings of the postmodern thinker Jean-François Lyotard; for instance his chamber music pieces "Aktualisierungszwang" [compulsion for actualisation] and "Tonregelsystem 189" [system for sound regulation 189], which deal in particular with the event philosophy of Lyotard, as well as the orchestra series "Le Différend XVII-XXIII", which are dedicated to his main philosophical work of the same title.

From the beginning of his career onwards, Hessler has been placing particular emphasis on musical breaks and the configuration of transitions between the different genres and styles. During the mid-1980s, for example, the program of the Flax-Trio, which Hessler belonged to as a formative member, pianist and keyboarder, reads: "With pleasure, the boundaries between completely different musical styles are torn down; these are then decomposed into single pieces, absorbed and brought back to the listener in entirely new forms." This compositional technique, which Hessler in leaning on Frank Zappa calls "conceptual discontinuity", significantly marks his producing until today.

== Writing (selection) ==
How close theory and practice are, can be seen in Hessler's transfer of the theory of intensities onto the practice of music in his book on Jean-François Lyotard. The theory of intensities implies that, in the case of conflict between two discourses, or rather, during the transition from one discourse to the other, intensive feelings occur. The book carries the title Philosophie der postmodernen Musik.

The fact that not only Pierre Boulez, but also Madonna need to be considered under the heading of contemporary music, becomes clear in Hessler's posthistorical considerations in relation to the "Disappearance of music" (orig. "Das Verschwinden der Musik")

In his comprehensive treatise "Der zornige Baron", Hessler shows among others that, according to his view, the musician and composer Charles Mingus can also be subsumed under the ideal type of "conceptual discontinuity".

== Political commitment ==
Hessler interprets one of the most significant key texts on the discussion around postmodernism "Überquert die Grenze, schließt den Graben!" (Cross the border, close the trench!) by Leslie Fiedler in the sense of an education mandate for artists and as a negotiated agreement of a convinced democrat to contribute, also in the area of contemporary music, to the overcoming of elitist and mass culture.

== Catalogue of works (selection) ==
=== Piano works ===
- Adagio e molto espressivo (1992)
- Allegro vivace (1992)
- Claude und der ungerade Takt [Claude and the uneven beat] (1994)
- Quasi Fuga (1992)
- S.L.Y. (1994)
- Verschwindungen Über-ES (1999)
- 10 lateinamerikanische Kompositionen [10 Latin-American compositions] (2003)
- 10 Well-Tempered Appearances of the Blues (2003)

=== Organ works ===
- A.C. D.E.B. (2006)
- Dance Macabre (2003)
- D.S.C.A. (2009)
- Evocationen Nr.1 & Nr.2 [Evocations No. 1 & No. 2] (1995)
- G.F. H.A.E. (2006)
- Impressionen Nr.1 & Nr.2 [Impressions No. 1 & No. 2] (1995)
- Irritationen 1 [Irritations 1] (2003)
- Radierungen [Erasings] (2000)

=== Chamber music ===
- Aktualisierungszwang für Klavier, Kontrabass und Violine [Compulsion for actualisation for piano, double bass and violin] (1997)
- Bitte stehen lassen für Kontrabass und Bassklarinette [Please leave standing for double bass and bass clarinet] (1987)
- CHANFLAX für Kontrabass, Bassklarinette und Klavier [CHANFLAX for double bass, bass clarinet and piano] (1988)
- Continuum contra Punctum für Klavier, Kontrabass, Violine und Marimbaphon [Continuum contra Punctum for piano, double bass, violin and marimbaphone] (1997)
- Der Bilderbuchmond für Stimme und Klavier [The storybook moon for voice and piano] (1994)
- Ein leerer Traum des Glücks für Stimme, Sopransaxophon und Klavier [An empty dream of happiness for voice, soprano saxophone and piano] (1994)
- Erwachen für Stimme, Sopransaxophon und Klavier [Awakening for voice, soprano saxophone and piano] (1992)
- Immer schön lächeln für Kontrabass, Bassklarinette und Klavier [Keep smiling for double bass, bass clarinet and piano] (1987)
- Methexis I–VII for 3 violins, double bass, 2 trombones, trumpet, flute, clarinet, vibraphone, timbal, accordion, piano and voice (1994)
- Sechs Diskurse für Violine solo [Six discourses for violin solo] (1997)
- Tanz im Vogelkäfig No. 2 (Satirical Dance) für Streichquartett mit Nebeninstrumenten [Dance in the bird cage No. 2 (Satirical Dance) for string quartet with side instruments] (2004)
- Tonregelsystem 189 für Klavier, Kontrabass, Violine und Marimbaphon [Sound regulation system 189 for piano, double bass, violin and merimbaphone] (1997)

=== Orchestra works ===
- HALB! (Hommage à Leonard Bernstein, 2000)
- Le Différend XVII (1997)
- Le Différend XXI (1997)
- Le Différend XXIII (1997)
- Nabuli Tintin (1999)
- Picturesque Sceneries: The Musical Journey Of Anna And Her Magical Flute (2005)
- Sarabanda (2010)
- WTC – Meditatio Pacis – Invocatio Pacis (on the occasion of 11 September 2001)

=== Theatre music ===
- Marat/Sade (1996)
- Requiem für einen Spion [Requiem for a spy] (1994)
- ruhr.mensch! (2003)

=== Improvisations ===
- Canción del Emperador (2009)
- Kaleidoskop No. 1 (1999)
- Spiegel im Spiegel [Mirror in the mirror] (2008)
- Tanz auf dem Vulkan [Dance on the volcano] (2006)
