= Constitution of Saarland =

The Constitution of Saarland is the state constitution of the German federal state of Saarland.

== History ==
=== Origin ===
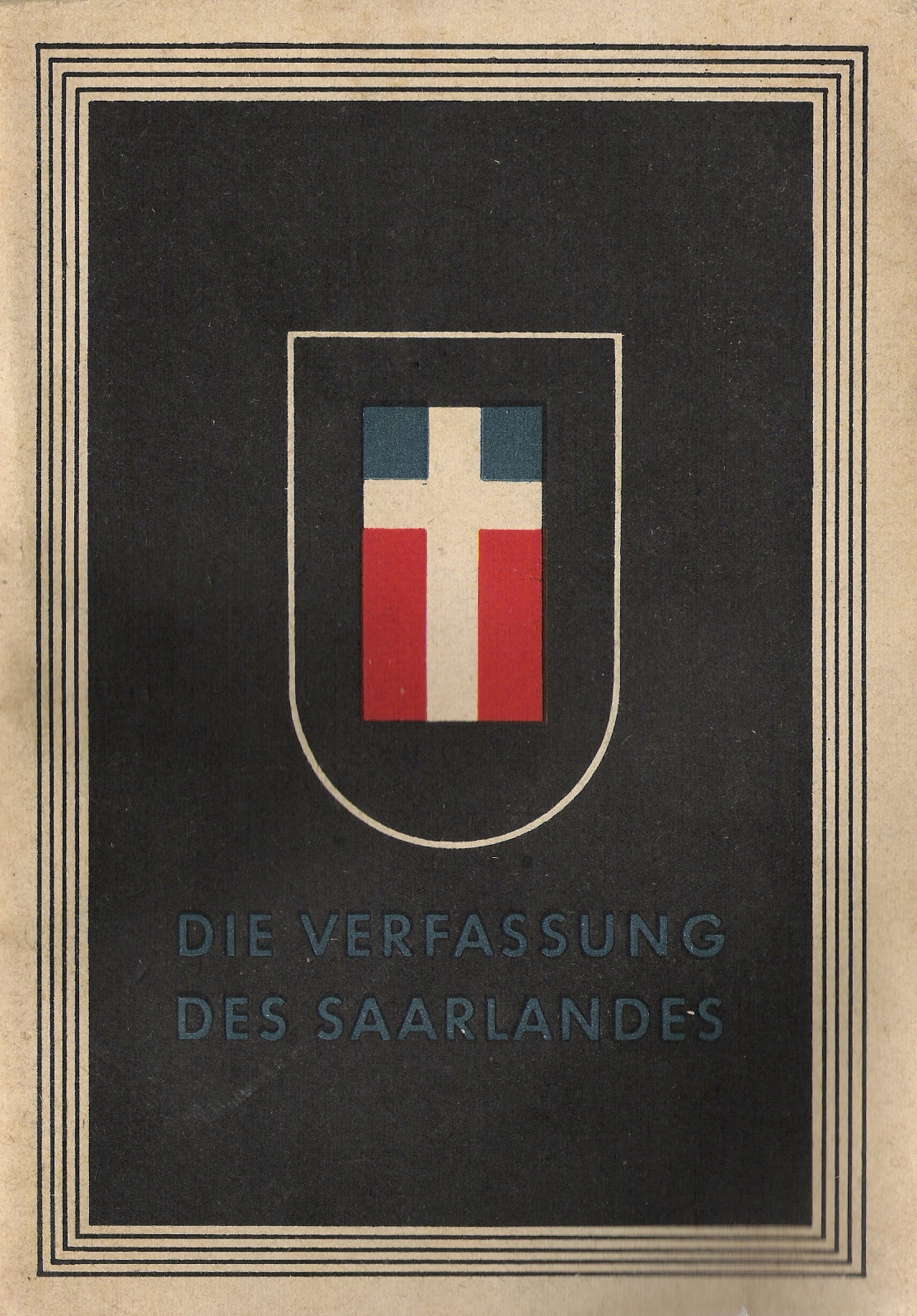
Constitution of Saarland

After the Second World War, France originally intended to secede the entire area to the left of the Rhine from Germany. However, these plans were rejected at the Allied Foreign Ministers' Conferences. As a result, France tried to force Saarland to secede from Germany and integrate Saarland economy into the French economy.

On May 23, 1947, by order of the military governor Grandval, a constitutional commission was elected by appointing 20 commission members. This commission drew up a draft constitution, which, however, was not accepted by the French occupying forces. The military government therefore submitted a memorandum to the Commission that should be taken into account in the constitution. The Saarland should:

- be linked to France economically and monetary policy-wise
- therefore adapt to French customs and currency laws
- be separated from Germany and granted political autonomy
- leave foreign relations and defence to France
- a French High Commissioner with regulatory and supervisory powers to ensure economic integration

These points were included in the preamble to the Constitution:

Preamble to the Constitution of the Saarland of 15 December 1947 (OJ p. 1077) The people of the Saar, called upon to reorganize their community life culturally, politically, economically and socially after the collapse of the German Empire, imbued with the knowledge that their existence and development can be secured by the organic integration of Saarland into the economic sphere of the French Republic, trusting in an international statute that will establish the basis for their independent existence and their resurgence, base their future on the economic connection of Saarland to the French Republic and the currency and customs unity with it, which includes: the political independence of Saarland from the German Empire, national defense and the representation of Saarland interests abroad by the French Republic, the application of French customs and currency laws in Saarland, the appointment of a representative of the government of the French Republic with the right to issue regulations to ensure customs and currency unity and supervisory authority to guarantee the observance of the statute, an organization of the judicial system that guarantees the uniformity of jurisdiction within the framework of the statute. The State Parliament of Saarland, freely elected by the people, has therefore, in order to give binding expression to this will and – after overcoming a system that degraded and enslaved the human personality – to anchor freedom, humanity, law and morality as the foundations of the new state, whose mission it is to build a bridge for understanding between peoples and to serve world peace in reverence for God, adopted the following constitution:: […]

On October 5, 1947, a constitutional assembly was elected, which drafted a constitution based on the preliminary work of the constitutional commission. The Constitution of Saarland was adopted by the Constitutional Assembly of Saarland in Saarbrücken on November 8, 1947. Dated December 15, 1947, it came into force with publication in the official gazette of Saarland on December 17, 1947.

=== Annexation to the Federal Republic of Germany ===
On October 23, 1955, after a heated election campaign, a referendum on the future of the country was finally held, with Saarlanders voting against the Saar Statute. On October 27, 1956, the Saar Treaty was concluded in Luxembourg, and in 1957 the region became the tenth state (excluding Berlin) to join the Federal Republic of Germany.

This development was also reflected in the constitution, which was amended by laws no. 548 of 20 December 1956 (OJ p. 1657) and no. 640 of 1 July 1958 (OJ p. 735). Among other things, the preamble, which closely aligned Saarland with the French Republic, was deleted without replacement. Numerous formulations were brought into line with the versions commonly used in the Federal Republic.

== Content and structure ==
The constitution is divided into 3 main parts, which are in turn divided into sections. They regulate: 1. Main part: Fundamental rights and duties

1. The individual
2. Marriage and family
3. Upbringing, teaching, public education, cultural activities, sport
4. Churches and religious communities
5. Economic and social order
6. Protection of natural resources, animal welfare

2. Main part: Tasks and structure of the state

1. Section on Basic Law
2. Section on elections and referendums
3. Section on Organs of the WIll of the People (Landtag of Saarland, Saar state government, Constitutional Court of Saarland)
4. Legislation
5. Finance
6. Judiciary
7. Administration and officials
8. Local self-government

3. Main part: Final and transitional provisions

== Literature ==
- Peter Krause: Die Verfassungsentwicklung im Saarland seit 1980. In: Jahrbuch des öffentlichen Rechts der Gegenwart. Neue Folge, Bd. 51, 2003, S. 403–457.
- Werner Thieme: Die Entwicklung des Verfassungsrechts im Saarland von 1945 bis 1958. In: Jahrbuch des öffentlichen Rechts der Gegenwart. Neue Folge, Bd. 9, 1960, S. 432–462.
- Rudolf Wendt/Roland Rixecker: Verfassung des Saarlandes, Kommentar. Herausgegeben von den Mitgliedern des Verfassungsgerichtshofs des Saarlandes, Verlag Alma Mater, Saarbrücken 2009, ISBN 978-3-935009-37-9; auch als PDF.
