= Constitution of the State of Schleswig-Holstein =

Constitution of the State of Schleswig-Holstein in the version of 2 December 2014 in German and Low German versions

The Constitution of the State of Schleswig-Holstein of December 13, 1949 came into force on January 12, 1950, under the title State Statute for Schleswig-Holstein. A constitutional and parliamentary reform also led to a change in title on June 13, 1990. The current publication of the constitution of the state of Schleswig-Holstein dates from December 2, 2014.

== History ==
=== Pre-history ===
The German lawyer and civil servant Uwe Jens Lornsen, who was temporarily employed by Denmark, had already done some preliminary work in the first half of the 19th century with his writings on the constitutional situation of the duchies of Schleswig and Holstein, which were linked to the Danish crown. At that time, Schleswig was a fief of Denmark, Holstein a member state of the German Confederation - but both territories were ruled by the Danish king in personal union as duke. Lornsen, however, demanded more autonomy for Schleswig-Holstein within Danish politics, which was still very much influenced by absolutism.

At the beginning of the Schleswig-Holstein uprising on July 24, 1848, a commission of the provisional government had already presented a draft of a "Basic State Law for the Duchies of Schleswig = Holstein". Article 3 of the draft stated: "The Duchies of Schleswig = Holstein are a part of the German State Union". In 1854, the Danish government presented a constitution for Schleswig and Holstein.

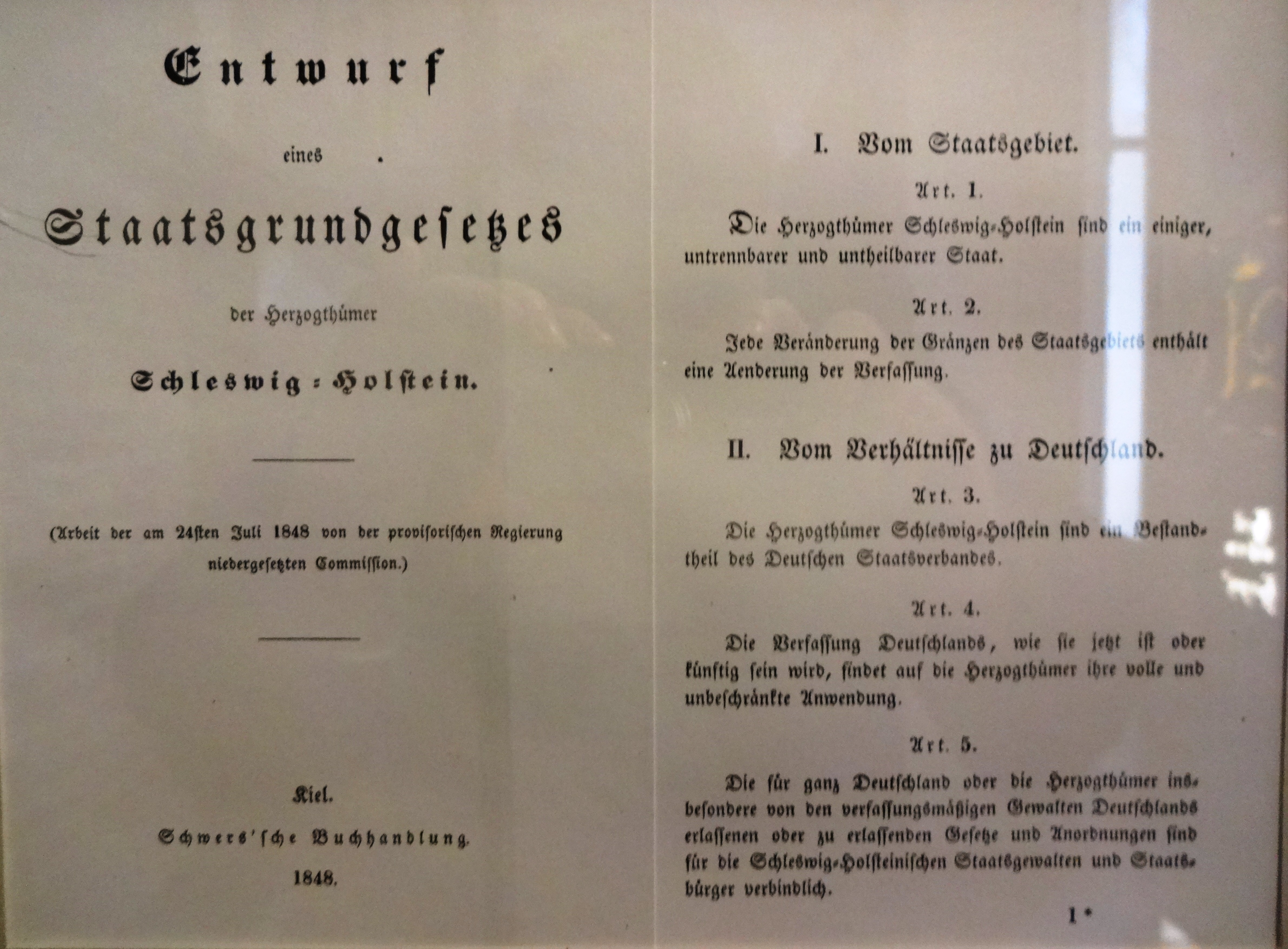
Draft of a Basic Law for Schleswig-Holstein from 1848

After the Second World War, Schleswig-Holstein was governed by the British military government. In 1946, the British military government issued a provisional state statute as a provisional constitution. The appointed state parliament approved this law on June 12, 1946. This provisional constitution formed the legal framework in Schleswig-Holstein until the 1949 constitution was passed.

=== Origin ===
In 1949, the first elected state parliament of Schleswig-Holstein, which emerged from the Prussian province of the same name, passed a state statute. The term "statute" was chosen instead of "constitution" because, like the Basic Law of the Federal Republic, it was only to be valid until the divided Germany was reunited in one state.

The debate on the constitution took place in a poisonous atmosphere. After the state elections in Schleswig-Holstein in 1947, the SPD had an absolute majority of representatives in the state parliament thanks to the right to vote, despite only receiving 41.1% of the vote. In the local elections on 24 October 1948 and the federal election in 1949, the CDU had even become stronger than the SPD. Due to this constellation, the SPD rejected the opposition's demand to convene a constitutional assembly and decided that the state parliament should adopt the state statutes. The opposition parties' resistance to the constitutional provision that the constitution should be adopted with an absolute majority, but that future amendments to the constitution would require a two-thirds majority, was even fiercer.

Through these regulations, the SPD intended to permanently secure the highly controversial core points of its policy, the six-year primary school and land reform.

After the Minister of the Interior, Wilhelm Käber, presented the draft of the state statutes containing these regulations on October 24, 1949, the representative Hermann von Mangoldt of the CDU Schleswig-Holstein demanded that the CDU not participate in the constitutional consultations on this basis and would contest the result before the Federal Constitutional Court. The SSW also expressed sharp criticism of the procedure and the draft.

The SPD was not prepared to comply with the opposition's wishes. The consultations therefore only took place with the SPD and SSW representatives. The CDU had only sent Hans-Jürgen Klinker and Emmy Lüthje as observers.

Minister-President Hermann Lüdemann (SPD) tried to find a compromise by proposing to delete the paragraph on the six-year primary school. His party rejected this proposal with the argument that other majorities could then abolish this regulation again in the future.

Due to this situation, the discussion on the bill resulted in only a few changes. The length of the legislative period was extended from 3 to 4 years compared to the draft (although this rule would only apply from the next election) and a constructive vote of no confidence was introduced. The regulations on land reform (Article 8) and primary school remained in the constitution. The constitution was adopted on December 13, 1949, with the votes of 42 SPD MPs against the votes of the two CDU observers and the SSW. Only the two SSW MPs Berthold Bahnsen and Victor Graf von Reventlow-Criminil abstained..

=== Corrections in 1950 ===
The SPD's efforts to use the constitution to permanently protect the core points of its policy against democratic opinion-forming were unsuccessful. In the 1950 state election in Schleswig-Holstein, the party lost 16.3% of the vote and had to go into opposition. On November 20, 1950, the constitutional provisions on the six-year primary school and land reform were deleted from the state statutes.

=== New version in 1990 ===
The Kiel affair involving the then Prime Minister Uwe Barschel led to a comprehensive constitutional and parliamentary reform in 1990, which culminated in the law amending the state statutes for Schleswig-Holstein of 13 June 1990 (GVOBl. Schl.-H. p. 391).

=== Reform in 2014 ===
In April 2013, all parliamentary groups decided to set up a special committee on constitutional reform with the aim of examining and presenting, among other things, the following points:

- Introduction of a preamble
- Introduction of a catalogue of fundamental rights
- Enactment of minority schooling
- Strengthening the Parliament in the European multi-level system
- Improving cooperation with other federal states
- Strengthening direct democratic participation opportunities
- Introduction of a state constitutional complaint and a right of action for the State Audit Office of Schleswig-Holstein
- Review of municipal financial equalization
- Inclusion of further state objectives

The deliberations of the special committee also dealt with suggestions from the public and associations, some of which were also taken into account. The special committee's deliberations also dealt with suggestions from the public and associations, some of which were also taken into account. The decision in the state parliament was made on October 8, 2014. 61 of the 66 members present voted for the inter-party motion to amend the constitution. The new constitution lowers the quorums for referendums. The protection of digital privacy and the further development of basic digital services, like the school system for the Danish minority, are given constitutional status. The inclusion of students with disabilities and a citizen-oriented administration are also state tasks (the constitution speaks of "state goals"). The state parliament is given more rights and can in future force the government to file a constitutional complaint with the Federal Constitutional Court. There was no majority in the state parliament to amend the constitution to include a reference to God. Two motions to subsequently include a reference to God in the constitution were also rejected in July 2016.

== Contents ==
According to Article 1 of its constitution, Schleswig-Holstein is a member state of the Federal Republic of Germany. Like the Basic Law, the state constitution stipulates the separation of powers between legislative power (legislature, the state parliament), executive power (executive, the state government and administration) and judicial power (judiciary, the courts). Another constitutional body is the State Audit Office. In addition, there is a so-called vertical separation of powers between the state level and the municipal level, which each have their own responsibilities and tasks. The constitution also contains far-reaching elements of direct democracy. A new element of the constitution from 1990 onwards are so-called state objectives, such as the protection of minorities of the Frisian and Danish ethnic groups and, according to the state parliament resolution of 14 November 2012, of the German Sinti and Roma in the country (Article 5), the promotion of equality between men and women (Article 6), the protection of natural resources (Article 7) or the protection and promotion of culture, including the Low German language (Article 9).

Until the establishment of a state constitutional court in Schleswig in May 2008, jurisdiction for state constitutional disputes lay with the Federal Constitutional Court.

== Literature ==
- Ausführliche Protokolle über die gemeinsamen Sitzungen der Ausschüsse für Verfassung und Geschäftsordnung und innere Verwaltung vom 8. November bis 6. Dezember 1949 zur Beratung des Entwurfs einer Landessatzung für Schleswig-Holstein. Landtag, Kiel 1949 (Landesvorlage Nr. 263/3, 3. Schleswig-Holsteinischer Landtag)
- Karl Mannzen: Die Landessatzung für Schleswig-Holstein. In: Jahrbuch des öffentlichen Rechts der Gegenwart. Mohr Siebeck, Tübingen 1957 ISSN 0075-2517, Bd. 6.1957, S. 251–283
- Harald Nydahl: Landessatzung für Schleswig-Holstein. Textausgabe mit Sachverzeichnis. Nydahl, Kiel 1972
- Uwe Barschel, Volkram Gebel: Landessatzung für Schleswig-Holstein. Kommentar Wachholtz, Neumünster 1976, ISBN 3-529-06158-1
- Magnus G. Staak: Landessatzung für Schleswig-Holstein. Textausgabe mit Verweisungen und einer erläuternden Einführung. 2., neubearb. Aufl. Deutscher Gemeindeverlag, Köln 1977, ISBN 3-555-10060-2
- Zur Entstehung der Verfassung 1949/50. In: Erich Maletzke, Klaus Volquartz: Der Schleswig-Holsteinische Landtag – Zehn Wahlperioden im Haus an der Förde. Kiel 1983, S. 54–57
- Vorläufige Verfassung des Landes Schleswig-Holstein vom 12. Juni 1946. Grundlage des parlamentarisch-demokratischen Neubeginns oder überholtes Dokument eines verfassungspolitischen Übergangs? Dokumentation der Vortragsveranstaltung vom 12. Juni 1986 hrsg. vom Vorstand des Lorenz-von-Stein-Instituts für Verwaltungswissenschaft an der Christian-Albrechts-Universität zu Kiel. Kiel 1986 (Quellen zur Verwaltungsgeschichte 2)
- Edzard Schmidt-Jortzig: Reformüberlegungen für die Landessatzung Schleswig-Holstein. Verfassungsrechtliche Konsequenzen aus der Barschel-Pfeiffer-Affäre. Kiel 1988 (Schriften der Hermann-Ehlers-Akademie 25)
- Reinhard Eckstein: Die Reform der Landessatzung für Schleswig-Holstein 1989/90. Kiel 1991 (Kiel, Univ., M. A., 1992)
- Dorothee Hassenpflug-Hunger: Verfassungsrechtliche Abmessungen parlamentarischer Opposition nach dem Grundgesetz und Art. 12 der Verfassung des Landes Schleswig-Holstein. Lang, Frankfurt am Main 1999, ISBN 3-631-33467-2 (Kiel, Univ., Diss., 1998)
- De Verfaten vun dat Land Sleswig-Holsteen. Die Verfassung des Landes Schleswig-Holstein. Op Plattdüütsch und Hochdeutsch (Hrsg. Der Präsident des Schleswig-Holsteinischen Landtages). Übertragung ins Niederdeutsche von W. Diercks; J. Waack; E.R. Andersen. Präsident des Schleswig-Holsteinischen Landtags, Kiel 2000
- Johannes Caspar (Hrsg.): Verfassung des Landes Schleswig-Holstein. Kommentar. Lorenz-von-Stein-Inst. für Verwaltungswiss., Kiel 2006, ISBN 3-936773-25-4 (Landesrecht Schleswig-Holstein 2)
- Felix Welti: Der Schutz pflegebedürftiger Menschen durch die Verfassung des Landes Schleswig-Holstein. In: Festschrift für das Schleswig-Holsteinische Landesverfassungsgericht. Lorenz-von-Stein-Instituts für Verwaltungswissenschaft an der Christian-Albrechts-Universität zu Kiel, Kiel 2008, S. 179–198 (Arbeitspapier / Lorenz-von-Stein-Institut 85)
