= Constitutional review in Germany =

The constitution (Grundgesetz) of the Federal Republic of Germany establishes a separate Federal Constitutional Court of Germany (Bundesverfassungsgericht) that is empowered with reviewing acts of the legislature (which mainly refers to the Federal Republic's Congress – the Bundestag and Bundesrat) for their constitutionality.

Most states (Bundesländer) also have separate courts for the according purpose. These are separate Supreme Courts that do not deal with appellate cases in civil and criminal law – but rather, just in constitutional cases.

The Federal Constitutional Court of Germany can also review and reject constitutional amendments on the grounds that they are contradictory to the rest of the Federal Constitution ("Verfassungswidriges Verfassungsrecht"), unlike, for instance, the Supreme Court of the United States and the Supreme Court of Canada. An amendment may only be rejected however if it conflicts with the principles of Article 1 and 20, since they may never be changed as determined by Article 79 (eternity clause).

== See also ==
- Constitutional complaint (Germany) – Procedure permitting private persons to initiate review of a particular state action that may be in violation of their own subjective rights under constitutional law before the Federal Constitutional Court
