= Constitution of North Rhine-Westphalia =

Constitutional document governing the German state of North Rhine-Westphalia

The Constitution of North Rhine-Westphalia (German: Verfassung für das Land Nordrhein-Westfalen) is the constitutional document that governs the responsibilities and rights of various offices and the Landtag (State Parliament) of North Rhine-Westphalia, in Germany.

== Background ==
After the collapse of the Third Reich after the Second World War, the area now covered by North Rhine-Westphalia was administered by Britain as part of the Allied occupation of Germany. The British unified the former Prussian province of Westphalia (Westfalen in German) and the northern part of the Prussian Rhine province (Rheinprovinz) on August 23, 1946. The duchy of Lippe-Detmold was combined with these around six months later, in January 1947.

On June 6, 1950, after three years of discussion, the Landtag of North Rhine-Westphalia by a narrow vote enacted a permanent constitution. This was ratified by the public in a plebiscite of 18 June 1950, with a majority of 57% voting for. This was in accordance with Article 90 of the constitution itself, which demanded such a vote.

== Provisions ==
The constitution, as amended, has 92 articles, covering the operation of the state.

=== Articles 1, 2 and 3: Fundamental Principles ===
Article 1 establishes North Rhine-Westphalia as a member state of the Federal Republic of Germany, with its own subdivisions, and its own right to choose a flag and coat of arms (the coat of arms of North Rhine-Westphalia). Article 2 establishes the principle of a plebiscite, and article 3 the separation of powers between parliament and the courts.

=== Articles 4–29: Fundamental Rights and the Organisation of Community Life ===
Together, the section covers basic human rights (Article 4), the rights of the family (Articles 5 and 6), education (Articles 7–17), religion and the churches (Articles 18–23), work, the economy and the environment (Articles 24–29).

=== Articles 30–88: The Bodies and Tasks of the Land ===
This section of the constitution focussed mostly on the operation of the government of North Rhine-Westphalia. The first sub-section cover the actions and organisation of the Landtag (Parliament), with Articles 30–50. Articles 51–64 cover the Landesregiergung (State cabinet, similar to the Bundesregierung), its intersections with the Landtag and some details of the role of the minister-president; articles 65–71 legislation within North Rhine-Westphalia; and articles 72–76 the law courts. Administration is also covered in this section (Articles 77–80), along with financial provisions (Articles 81–88).

Articles 88–92 finished the constitution and its institution, along with the transition to the new system.

The constitution was signed by the members of the state government.
