= Constitutional review =

Legal procedure on constitutional matters

Constitutional review, also called constitutionality review or constitutional control, is the evaluation, in some countries, of the constitutionality of the laws. It is intended to be a system of preventing violation of rights granted by the constitution, assuring efficacy, stability, and preservation.

There are very specific cases in which the constitutional review differs from common law to civil law and judicial review in general.

Written and rigid constitutions represent the supreme norm of the juridical order and are at the top of the pyramid of norms. Also called fundamental law, supreme law, law of the laws, and basic law, they have more formal procedures to updating them than other laws, which are sub-constitutional. The term "constitutional review" is often characterized as a Civil Law concept, but some of the ideas behind it come from Common Law countries with written constitutions. For instance, the United States was the first country to adopt judicial review based directly on its constitution (see Marbury v. Madison), even though the functions of the Constitutional Court and of the Court of the Last Resort are separated at neither Federal nor State level in the United States.

The judicial control of constitutionality applies to normative acts as well.

== Control systems ==
Depending on how each country decides to organize his constitutional reviews, it can be attributed to a different organ. In some countries, part of the review can be attribution of a political organ. For instance, In Brazil, the declaration of unconstitutionality in a concrete case by the Supreme Federal Court (STF) can be suggested to senate to give to this declaration global effects.

== Bans on constitutional review ==
Countries can put a ban on constitutional review. Historically, the allowance of judicial review of legislative acts for constitutionality was rare prior to the 20th century. Especially following World War II, many countries began to adopt systems of constitutional review, such that in the 21st century, the lack of such a system is considered exceptional.

=== Ban on constitutional review in the Netherlands ===
The Constitution of the Netherlands explicitly forbids courts to rule on the constitutionality of laws passed by parliament, making the Netherlands one of the few constitutional democracies to lack constitutional review as of 2020. The reason for this ban is that constitutional review would put the judiciary in a legislative position, which conflicts with the idea of the separation of powers. The Dutch parliament is responsible for the adherence of the laws it passes to the Constitution. The Supreme Court of the Netherlands has ruled that this ban on constitutional review also extends to rulings on the creation of laws, rulings based on the Charter for the Kingdom of the Netherlands and general principles of law. The monist Constitution does explicitly allow the review of laws by treaties that contain provisions binding all members. Consequently, treaties like the European Convention on Human Rights in practice have taken a constitutional review-like effect.

== In specific jurisdictions ==
- Constitutional review in Germany

== See also ==
- Constitutional Review Commission (Tanzania)
- Judicial interpretation
- Judicial review
- List of constitutional courts
- Rule of law
- Rule According to Higher Law
