= Constitution of Berlin =

The Constitution of Berlin (German: Verfassung von Berlin) is the state constitution of the German state of Berlin.

The current constitution was introduced November 23, 1995, and was passed by the Abgeordnetenhaus of Berlin on June 8, 1995, and confirmed by the majority of Berliners in the referendum on October 22, 1995.

== History ==
It replaced the constitution of September 1, 1950. Section II contained significant additions to the previous constitution: the catalogue of fundamental rights was expanded, state objectives were introduced into the constitution, and the prohibition of discrimination was enshrined for the first time. Section III expanded the rights of members of parliament and established the office of data protection officer. Section V was expanded to include options for popular legislation in a three-stage process of popular initiative, referendum, and popular vote. Finally, Section VII laid the foundation for the Constitutional Court of Berlin.

The constitution of 1950 already claimed in Article 4 that it was valid for all of Berlin, but until reunification it could de facto only be enforced in West Berlin, not in East Berlin. Since January 11, 1991, it has been valid for all of Berlin.

The Constitution of Berlin has no reference to God. Article 10 paragraph 2 includes protection against discrimination based on sexual orientation.

== Structure and content ==
The Constitution of Berlin is divided into 9 sections and 101 articles:

Preamble Resolving to protect the freedom and the rights of every individual, to afford democratic order to the community and the economy, and to serve the spirit of social progress and peace, Berlin, the capital of the united Germany, has adopted the following Constitution:

I	Fundamental Provisions
II	Basic Rights; State Aims
III	Representation of the People (the Berlin House of Representatives)
IV	The Government (the Senate of Berlin)
V	Legislation
VI	The Administrative Apparatus
VII	Administration of Justice
VIII	Finance
IX	Transitional and Final Provisions

== Sources ==
- Breunig, Werner (1990). Verfassungsgebung in Berlin 1945–1950 (in German). Berlin: Duncker & Humblot. doi:10.3790/978-3-428-46965-9. ISBN 3-428-06965-X.
- Driehaus, Hans-Joachim, ed. (2020). Verfassung von Berlin: Taschenkommentar (in German) (4 ed.). Baden-Baden: Nomos Verlagsgesellschaft. ISBN 978-3-8487-5595-0.
- Pestalozza, Christian (2014). Verfassungen der deutschen Bundesländer – mit dem Grundgesetz (in German) (10 ed.). München: C.H. Beck. p. 64. ISBN 978-3-406-66242-3.
- Pfennig, Gero; Neumann, Manfred J., eds. (2000). Verfassung von Berlin: Kommentar. Sammlung Guttentag (in German) (3 ed.). Berlin: de Gruyter. doi:10.1515/9783110898033. ISBN 3-11-015524-9.
- Reichhardt, Hans Joachim, ed. (1990). Die Entstehung der Verfassung von Berlin: Eine Dokumentation (in German). Berlin: de Gruyter. doi:10.1515/9783110906301. ISBN 3-11-012414-9.
- Wassermann, Hendrik; van Ooyen, Robert; Schmidt-Rögnitz, Andreas (2024). Verfassung und Verwaltung von Berlin (in German) (5 ed.). Berliner Wissenschaftsverlag. ISBN 978-3-8305-5557-5.
- Wilke, Dieter; Ziekow, Jan (1988). "Die Entwicklung von Status und Verfassung des Landes Berlin seit 1945". Jahrbuch des öffentlichen Rechts der Gegenwart (in German). 37: 167–334. ISBN 3-16-645461-6.

== See also ==
- Constitution of Berlin (East), the provisional East Berlin constitution in the period of reunification in 1990
