= Constitutional complaint (Germany) =

Legal remedy in Germany

The (individual) constitutional complaint (German: (Individual-)Verfassungsbeschwerde) is an extraordinary legal remedy in German law. The procedure serves to vindicate constitutional rights (mostly under the Basic Law of the Federal Republic of Germany – Grundgesetz, abbreviated GG). Constitutional complaints at the federal level are adjudicated solely by the Federal Constitutional Court.

In 2024, according to the Court, 4,595 constitutional complaints were decided; of these, 39 were granted. Relief may extend to voiding a statute that is found to be unconstitutional. (Note: Bundesverfassungsgerichtsgesetz § 95, para. 3, sentence 1 - enacted pursuant to GG art. 93, para. 5, sentence 2.)

The constitutional complaint is set out in the Bundesverfassungsgerichtsgesetz (abbreviated BVerfGG), (Note: Refer to sec. 90 et seq., BVerfGG - available in English at Gesetze im Internet.de, https://www.gesetze-im-internet.de/englisch_bverfgg/englisch_bverfgg.html#p0400) which is the law establishing the Federal Constitutional Court itself, pursuant to GG art. 93, para. 5, sentence 1.

The constitutional complaint was originally codified in federal law (BVerfGG §§ 90 et seq.) and was not initially guaranteed by the constitution itself. It was incorporated into the constitution in 1969 as a political bargain. The constitution was then controversially amended to allow the declaration of a state of exception (Notstandsverfassung), allowing temporary restrictions on Basic Rights. It was felt that the constitutional complaint remedy had to be enshrined in the constitution to prevent its abolition by a simple repeal of the BVerfGG.

== Admissibility of complaints ==
Art. 94, para. 1, no. 4a of the Basic Law enumerates the rights that may be the subject of a constitutional complaint. These are the Basic Rights (Grundrechte) found in GG articles 1–19, as well as rights considered equivalent (GG art. 33, 38, 101, 103 or 104; also, art. 20, para. 4), (Note: GG art. 94 - available in English via Gesetze-im-Internet.de at https://www.gesetze-im-internet.de/englisch_gg/englisch_gg.html#p0520) like the right to stand for election or to be heard by a judge.

The constitutional complaint is open to natural persons and legal persons. However, constitutional rights apply to legal persons only insofar as they can be sensibly applied to them (GG art. 19, para. 3).

A constitutional complaint is admissible only if complainants, at the time of filing, have the legal standing (Beschwerdebefugnis) to do so. They must allege that one of their Basic Rights or equivalent rights (see the enumeration above) has been violated by an action or omission of German state power. That includes acts carried out by any level of government (not those, however, directly carried out by European Union agencies, which are not part of the German state), and any function of government (executive, judicial, legislative).
In particular, the act or omission must

1. affect the complainant themselves;
2. be affecting them currently (already or still);
3. and they must be affected directly, that is, there are no intermediate acts that need to be taken before the complainant is legally affected (immediacy).

Standing is virtually always given when there is a court judgment or administrative order against the complainant. Violations of constitutional rights by a law are also actionable, but most laws are not self-executing and therefore fail the immediacy requirement.

As an extraordinary remedy the constitutional complaint is subsidiary to regular remedies, especially appeals to higher courts, which means two things. In the first place, the appellants must have exhausted all other possible remedies, including, if appropriate, a complaint on the procedural grounds of not being judicially heard (for instance, a violation of audi alteram partem). Therefore, constitutional complaints are in practice mostly directed against judicial acts, not acts of the executive (which can still be contested before the administrative courts). Secondly, the complainant must have already raised the issue of the violation while in the course of their other remedies and so many complaints are dismissed as inadmissible.

Further, the complaint must be submitted in written form, and the case must be argued, with appropriate evidence attached. (Note: BVerfGG § 23, para. 1.) The action or omission by which the complainant alleges their rights have been violated must be specified, as well as the specific right that is alleged to have been violated. (Note: BVerfGG § 92, paras. 1 and 3.) Complaints against a law must be lodged within one year after it comes into force. and those against other acts must be filed within one month after service or notification. (Note: BVerfGG § 92, paras. 1 and 3.)

== Comparable remedies in other legal orders ==
The Verfassungsbeschwerde resembles, in certain respects, the writ of amparo, a remedy available in some Spanish-speaking nations.

== Sources ==
- Hillgruber, Christian; Goos, Christoph (2020). Verfassungsprozessrecht. Heidelberg: C.F. Müller.
