= List of supreme courts by country =

A supreme court is the highest court within the hierarchy of courts in most legal jurisdictions. Supreme courts include:

== List of supreme courts ==
=== States recognised by the United Nations ===
State	Court(s)	Mode of selection	Term (Years)	Retirement age	Number of members
Afghanistan	Supreme Court of Afghanistan (Note: This court is not independent of either the legislature and/or executive of that country.)	Appointed by the supreme leader	-	-	-
Albania	Constitutional Court of Albania	3 members appointed by the President 3 members elected by 3/5 of the Assembly 3 members elected by the High Court	9	70	9
Albania	Supreme Court of Albania	Appointed by the President with the consent of Parliament	9	70	17
Algeria	Constitutional Court of Algeria	4 members appointed by the President 2 elected by the Supreme Court 2 elected by the Council of State	6	-	12
Algeria	Supreme Court of Algeria	appointed by the executive	-	-	-
Andorra	Superior Court of Justice	-	-	-	5
Angola	Supreme Court of Angola	appointed by the president			
Angola	Constitutional Court of Angola	Four are appointed by the President, four by the National Assembly, two by the Superior Council of the Judiciary, and one elected by the public			11
Antigua and Barbuda	Eastern Caribbean Supreme Court				
Antigua and Barbuda	Judicial Committee of the Privy Council (see below)				
Argentina	Supreme Court of Argentina	Presidential nomination with Senate of Argentina confirmation (Judges) Ministers of the Supreme Court (President)	-	75	5
Armenia	Constitutional Court of Armenia	Elected/appointed by the National Assembly with an equal number of nominations by the president, the government and a general meeting of judges	12 years, non-renewable	70	9
Armenia	Court of Cassation				
Australia	High Court of Australia	Appointed by Governor-General following nomination by Prime Minister, and advice from Attorney-General and Cabinet		70	7
Austria	Constitutional Court of Austria	Justices are sworn in by the President on nomination of either the Government, the National Council, or the Federal Council		Mandatory retirement at 70 years of age	14 members (including the President and the Vice President) 6 substitute members
Austria	Supreme Court of Justice	Presidential appointment on nomination of the minister of justice			60
Austria	Administrative Court of Austria				
Azerbaijan	Constitutional Court of Azerbaijan				
Azerbaijan	Supreme Court of Azerbaijan				
Bahamas	Supreme Court of the Bahamas				11
Bahamas	Judicial Committee of the Privy Council (see below)				
Bahrain	Constitutional Court				
Bahrain	Court of Cassation				
Bahrain	Supreme Court of Appeal				
Bahrain	High Sharia Court of Appeal				
Bangladesh	Supreme Court of Bangladesh	The Chief Justice of Bangladesh and other judges of the Supreme Court are appointed by the President of Bangladesh with prior mandatory consultation with the Prime Minister.		67	6 in Appellate Division 95 in High Court Division
Barbados	Supreme Court of Judicature				
Barbados	Caribbean Court of Justice				
Belarus	Constitutional Court of Belarus				12
Belarus	Supreme Court of Belarus				
Belgium	Constitutional Court				12
Belgium	Court of Cassation				30
Belize	Supreme Court of Belize				
Belize	Caribbean Court of Justice				
Benin	Constitutional Court of Benin				7
Benin	Supreme Court of Benin				
Benin	High Court of Justice				
Bhutan	Supreme Court of Bhutan	The Chief Justice of the Supreme Court (also called the "Chief Justice of Bhutan"), as well as its Drangpons are appointed by the Druk Gyalpo from among their juniors and peers, or from among other eminent jurists.	10	65	5
Bolivia	Plurinational Constitutional Court				
Bolivia	Supreme Court of Justice				9
Bosnia and Herzegovina	Constitutional Court of Bosnia and Herzegovina				9
Bosnia and Herzegovina	Court of Bosnia and Herzegovina				
Botswana	Court of Appeal				
Brazil	Supreme Federal Court	Presidential nomination with Senate confirmation	-	75	11
Brazil	Superior Court of Justice	Presidential nomination with Senate confirmation	-	75	33
Brunei	Supreme Court of Brunei				
Brunei	Judicial Committee of the Privy Council (see below)				
Bulgaria	Supreme Court of Cassation of Bulgaria				
Bulgaria	Supreme Administrative Court of Bulgaria				
Burkina Faso	Supreme Court of Burkina Faso				
Burundi	Supreme Court of Burundi	Nominated by the Judicial Service Commission and appointed by the President of the Republic after the approval of the Senate	5 years non-renewable		9 (Maximum of 15)
Burundi	Constitutional Court of Burundi	Appointed by the President of the Republic after approval by the Senate with at least 4 of the members appointed being career magistrates	8 years non-renewable		7
Cambodia	Constitutional Council of Cambodia				9
Cambodia	Supreme Court of Cambodia				9
Cameroon	Supreme Court of Cameroon				
Canada	Supreme Court of Canada	Judicial appointments in Canada		75	9
Cape Verde	Supreme Court of Justice				5 (minimum)
Central African Republic	Constitutional Court of the Central African Republic				
Central African Republic	Supreme Court of the Central African Republic				
Chad	Constitutional Council of Chad				9
Chad	Supreme Court of Chad				16
Chile	Constitutional Court of Chile				10
Chile	Supreme Court of Chile				21
China	Supreme People's Court	Elected (de facto appointed) by the National People's Congress or Standing Committee of the National People's Congress			400 (approximate)
China	Standing Committee of the National People's Congress (de facto, Hong Kong and Macau)				175
China	Court of Final Appeal (de jure, Macau)	Appointed by the Chief Executive on nomination of the Independent Judicial Officers Recommendation Commission.			
China	Court of Final Appeal (de jure, Hong Kong)	Appointed by the Chief Executive on nomination of the Judicial Officers Recommendation Commission and with the approval of the Legislative Council		70	
Colombia	Constitutional Court of Colombia				9
Colombia	Supreme Court of Justice				23
Colombia	Council of State				27
Comoros	Supreme Court of the Comoros				
(Republic of the Congo) Congo-Brazzaville	Supreme Court of Republic of the Congo				
(Democratic Republic of the Congo) Congo-Kinshasa	Constitutional Court				9
(Democratic Republic of the Congo) Congo-Kinshasa	Court of Cassation				26
(Democratic Republic of the Congo) Congo-Kinshasa	Council of State				
Costa Rica	Supreme Court of Justice of Costa Rica				
Croatia	Supreme Court of Croatia	Elected by the State Judicial Council	Five years in the first term, life tenure after renewal	70	42
Cuba	People's Supreme Court of Cuba				
Cyprus	Supreme Court of Cyprus				13
Czech Republic	Constitutional Court of the Czech Republic				15
Czech Republic	Supreme Court of the Czech Republic				
Czech Republic	Supreme Administrative Court of the Czech Republic				
Denmark	Supreme Court of Denmark	Appointed by the Minister of Justice upon the recommendation by an independent board		70	18
Djibouti	Supreme Court of Djibouti				
Dominica	Eastern Caribbean Supreme Court				
Dominica	Caribbean Court of Justice (see below)				
Dominican Republic	Supreme Court of the Dominican Republic	Elected by the National Council of Magistracy	9	-	16
Ecuador	Constitutional Court of Ecuador				
Ecuador	National Court of Justice of Ecuador				
Egypt	Supreme Constitutional Court of Egypt				
Egypt	Court of Cassation				
El Salvador	Supreme Court of El Salvador				
Equatorial Guinea	Constitutional Court of Equatorial Guinea				
Equatorial Guinea	Supreme Court of Equatorial Guinea				
Eritrea	High Court of Eritrea				
Estonia	Supreme Court of Estonia				
Eswatini	High Court of Eswatini				
Ethiopia	Federal Supreme Court				
Fiji	Supreme Court of Fiji				
Finland	Supreme Court of Finland				15 - 1 President a minimum of 14 others. (Currently 17)
Finland	Supreme Administrative Court of Finland				
France	Constitutional Council	3 members selected by the President of the Republic; 3 members selected by the President of the Senate; 3 members selected by the President of the National Assembly	9 years (non-renewable)		9 + 2 former presidents of the Republic (de facto)
France	Court of Cassation				
France	Council of State				
Gabon	Supreme Court of Gabon				
Gambia	Supreme Court of the Gambia				
Georgia	Constitutional Court of Georgia	3 Judges Appointed by the President of Georgia; 3 Judges Elected by the Parliament of Georgia; 3 Judges designated by the Supreme Court of Georgia	10		9
Georgia	Supreme Court of Georgia				
Germany	Federal Constitutional Court	Election by Bundestag and Bundesrat	12	68	16
Germany	Federal Court of Justice				
Germany	Federal Administrative Court				
Germany	Federal Fiscal Court				
Germany	Federal Labour Court				
Germany	Federal Social Court				
Ghana	Supreme Court of Ghana				
Greece	Supreme Special Court				
Greece	Supreme Civil and Criminal Court of Greece				
Greece	Council of State				
Greece	Court of Audit				
Grenada	Eastern Caribbean Supreme Court				
Grenada	Judicial Committee of the Privy Council (see below)				
Guatemala	Constitutional Court				
Guatemala	Supreme Court of Justice				
Guinea	Supreme Court of Guinea				
Guinea-Bissau	Supreme Court of Guinea-Bissau				
Guyana	Supreme Court of Judicature				
Guyana	Caribbean Court of Justice				
Haiti	Supreme Court of Haiti				
Honduras	Supreme Court of Honduras				
Hungary	Constitutional Court of Hungary				
Hungary	Curia of Hungary				
Iceland	Supreme Court of Iceland	Presidential appointment after Minister of Justice nomination following Qualifications Committee selection. Parliamentary confirmation before appointment if minister nomination differs from committee selection.	no term limit	Life tenure	7 (by statute)
India	Supreme Court of India	Appointed by the President, on recommendations (Note: Such recommendations are binding upon the President as per the Three Judges Cases) of the Supreme Court Collegium consisting of the 5 senior-most judges of the Supreme Court including the Chief Justice.	no term limit	65	38 including the Chief Justice of India
Indonesia	Constitutional Court of Indonesia				
Indonesia	Supreme Court of Indonesia				
Iran	Supreme Court of Iran	The chief of the Supreme Court is nominated by the head of the judiciary	5		42
Iraq	Court of Cassation of Iraq Federal Supreme Court of Iraq	Appointed by the Supreme Judicial Council of Iraq and approved by the Council of Representatives as per Article 61 of the Constitution. Appointed by a council composed of the heads of the Supreme Judicial Council, Federal Supreme Court, Judicial Supervisory Commission and Public Prosecutor’s Office.		72	Legal minimum of 15. Current composition is 26 judges + Chief Justice 8 judges + Chief Justice
Ireland	Supreme Court of Ireland	Appointed by the President, acting on the binding advice of the Government	Once appointed, a judge may only be removed by the Oireachtas for stated misbehaviour or incapacity	Mandatory retirement at age 70	10 and 2 ex officio members
Israel	Supreme Court of Israel	Presidential appointment upon nomination by the Judicial Selection Committee		70	15
Italy	Constitutional Court of Italy	Elected/appointed in equal portions by Italian Parliament, President of the Italian Republic, and highest Italian courts	9 years (not renewable)		15
Italy	Supreme Court of Cassation				
Ivory Coast	Constitutional Council				
Ivory Coast	Supreme Court of the Ivory Coast				
Jamaica	Court of Appeal				
Jamaica	Judicial Committee of the Privy Council (see below)				
Japan	Supreme Court of Japan	Selected by the Cabinet of Japan		Mandatory retirement at age 70	15
Jordan	Court of Cassation				
Kazakhstan	Constitutional Council of Kazakhstan				
Kazakhstan	Supreme Court of Kazakhstan				
Kenya	Supreme Court of Kenya				
Kiribati	Court of Appeal of Kiribati				
Kiribati	Judicial Committee of the Privy Council (see below)				
Kuwait	High Court of Appeal of Kuwait				
Kyrgyzstan	Supreme Court of Kyrgyzstan				
Laos	People's Supreme Court of Laos				
Latvia	Constitutional Court of Latvia	Elected/appointed in 3 portions by Saeima, 2 by Government of Latvia, and 2 by Supreme Court of Latvia	10	-	7
Latvia	Supreme Court of Latvia				
Lebanon	Constitutional Council				
Lebanon	Court of Cassation				
Lesotho	Lesotho Court of Appeal				
Liberia	Supreme Court of Liberia	Presidential nomination with Senate confirmation	no term limit	70	5
Libya	Supreme Court of Libya				
Liechtenstein	Supreme Court of Liechtenstein				
Lithuania	Constitutional Court of Lithuania	Renewed by a third every three years, each judge nominated by the President, Speaker of Seimas and the Head of the Supreme Court and appointed by Seimas	9 years (only one term allowed)		9
Lithuania	Supreme Court of Lithuania				
Luxembourg	Constitutional Court				
Luxembourg	Superior Court of Justice				
Luxembourg	Administrative Court				
Madagascar	High Constitutional Court of Madagascar	3 appointed by the President of the Republic, 2 elected by the National Assembly, 2 by the Senate and 2 by the Superior Council of the Judiciary	7	No mandatory retirement	9
Madagascar	Supreme Court of Madagascar	proposed by the Superior Council of the Judiciary then appointed by the Council of Ministers		No mandatory retirement	105
Malawi	High Court of Malawi				
Malawi	Supreme Court of Appeal				
Malaysia	Federal Court of Malaysia	Royal appointment with the advice of the Prime Minister		Compulsory retirement at age 66 and 6 months	15
Maldives	Supreme Court of the Maldives	Presidential Nomination and then People's Majlis Confirmation		Mandatory retirement at age 70	7
Mali	Supreme Court of Mali				
Malta	Constitutional Court of Malta				
Malta	Court of Civil Appeals of Malta				
Malta	Court of Criminal Appeals of Malta				
Marshall Islands	Supreme Court of the Marshall Islands				
Mauritania	Supreme Court of Mauritania				
Mauritius	Supreme Court of Mauritius	By the President, after consultation with the Prime Minister		67	17
Mauritius	Judicial Committee of the Privy Council (see below)				
Mexico	Supreme Court of Justice of the Nation	By Popular vote	15		11
Micronesia	Supreme Court of the Federated States of Micronesia				
Moldova	Constitutional Court of Moldova				
Moldova	Supreme Court of Justice of Moldova				
Monaco	Supreme Court of Monaco				
Mongolia	Constitutional Court of Mongolia	Parliamentary, presidential and judicial selection with parliamentary confirmation			9
Mongolia	Supreme Court of Mongolia	Appointment by President of Mongolia after presentation by the General Council of the Courts			25
Montenegro	Constitutional Court of Montenegro, Supreme Court of Montenegro				
Morocco	Constitutional Court of Morocco	6 members are appointed by the King, including one member proposed by the head of High Council of Ulema; 3 members are elected by the House of Representatives; 3 members are elected by the House of Councillors.			
Morocco	Supreme Court of Morocco				
Mozambique	Supreme Court of Mozambique				
Myanmar	Constitutional Tribunal of Myanmar				
Myanmar	Supreme Court of Myanmar				
Namibia	Supreme Court of Namibia				
Nauru	Supreme Court of Nauru				
Nepal	Supreme Court of Nepal	Presidential nomination with Parliament confirmation		65	21
Netherlands	Supreme Court of the Netherlands	Selected by the House of Representatives on advice of the Supreme Court and appointed by royal decree		70	36
Netherlands	Council of State				
New Zealand	Supreme Court of New Zealand	Appointed by the Governor-General on behalf of King Charles III on the advice of the Prime Minister (Chief Justice) and Attorney-General (Justices)		70	6
Nicaragua	Supreme Court of Nicaragua				
Niger	Constitutional Court of Niger				
Niger	Supreme Court of Niger				
Nigeria	Supreme Court of Nigeria	Presidential nomination with Senate confirmation	no term limit	70	21
North Korea	Supreme Court of the Democratic People's Republic of Korea	President and justices elected by the Supreme People's Assembly and its Standing Committee, respectively	5		unknown
North Macedonia	Constitutional Court of North Macedonia				
North Macedonia	Supreme Court of North Macedonia				
Norway	Supreme Court of Norway				20
Oman	Supreme Court of Oman				
Pakistan	Supreme Court of Pakistan	The President on the nomination of Judicial Commission of Pakistan and approval of the Parliamentary Committee.		65	17
Pakistan	Federal Shariat Court	The President of Pakistan has the power to appoint the judges of the court.		65	8
Palau	Supreme Court of Palau				
Palestine	Supreme Constitutional Court				
Palestine	Supreme Court of Palestine				
Panama	Supreme Court of Justice				
Papua New Guinea	Supreme Court of Papua New Guinea		10 year term, renewable		
Paraguay	Supreme Court of Justice				
Peru	Constitutional Court of Peru				
Peru	Supreme Court of Peru				
Philippines	Supreme Court of the Philippines	Presidential appointment from the shortlist of candidates submitted by the Judicial and Bar Council		70	15
Poland	Constitutional Tribunal				
Poland	Supreme Court of Poland				
Poland	Supreme Administrative Court				
Portugal	Constitutional Court of Portugal				
Portugal	Supreme Court of Justice				
Qatar	Court of Cassation of Qatar				
Romania	Constitutional Court of Romania	Senate selection (3 members); Chamber of Deputies selection (3 members); President selection (3 members)	9		9
Romania	High Court of Cassation and Justice				
Russia	Constitutional Court of Russia	Appointment by Federation Council with nomination by President of Russia	-	70 (76 for the Deputy President and none for the President)	11 (including the President and the Deputy President)
Russia	Supreme Court of Russia	Appointment by Federation Council with nomination by President of Russia based on the proposal by Prime Minister of Russia	-	70 (76 for the Deputy Chief Justices and none for the Chief Justice)	170
Rwanda	Supreme Court of Rwanda				
Saint Kitts and Nevis	Eastern Caribbean Supreme Court				
Saint Kitts and Nevis	Judicial Committee of the Privy Council (see below)				
Saint Lucia	Eastern Caribbean Supreme Court				
Saint Lucia	Caribbean Court of Justice (see below)				
Saint Vincent and the Grenadines	Eastern Caribbean Supreme Court				
Saint Vincent and the Grenadines	Judicial Committee of the Privy Council (see below)				
Samoa	Court of Appeal of Samoa				
Samoa	Supreme Court of Samoa				
San Marino	Council of Twelve				
São Tomé and Príncipe	Supreme Court of Justice				
Saudi Arabia	Supreme Judicial Council				
Senegal	Constitutional Council				
Senegal	Court of Cassation				
Serbia	Constitutional Court of Serbia	Parliament selection (5 members) Presidential selection (5 members); Supreme Court selection (5 memb.)	9	65	15
Serbia	Supreme Court of Serbia	Elected by the High Magistrate Council	life tenure	65	50
Seychelles	Supreme Court of Seychelles				
Sierra Leone	Supreme Court of Sierra Leone				
Singapore	Supreme Court of Singapore	Executive selection		65	
Slovakia	Constitutional Court of Slovakia				
Slovakia	Supreme Court of Slovakia				
Slovakia	Supreme Administrative Court of Slovakia				
Slovenia	Constitutional Court of Slovenia				
Slovenia	Supreme Court of Slovenia				
Solomon Islands	Court of Appeal of Solomon Islands				
Somalia	Constitutional Court				
Somalia	Federal High Court				
South Africa	Constitutional Court of South Africa				
South Africa	Supreme Court of Appeal of South Africa				
South Korea	Constitutional Court of Korea	Appointed by President upon nomination of equal portions from National Assembly, Supreme Court Chief Justice and the President	6 years, renewable	70	9
South Korea	Supreme Court of Korea	Appointed by President with consent of National Assembly (for associate Justices, nomination of Chief Justice is additionally required)	6 years, renewable	70	14
South Sudan	Supreme Court of South Sudan				
Spain	Constitutional Court of Spain	Appointed by the King after being nominated by the Parliament, the General Council of the Judiciary and the Government.	9		12
Spain	Supreme Court of Spain	Appointed by Monarch on selection by the General Council of the Judiciary		70	79
Sri Lanka	Supreme Court of Sri Lanka				
Sudan	Supreme Court of Sudan				
Suriname	High Court of Justice of Suriname				
Sweden	Supreme Court of Sweden	Government-appointed with parliamentary notification	Life tenure	67	16
Sweden	Supreme Administrative Court of Sweden				
Switzerland	Federal Supreme Court of Switzerland				
Syria	Supreme Constitutional Court	Presidential appointment			7
Syria	Supreme Judicial Council				
Tajikistan	Supreme Court of Tajikistan				
Tanzania	Court of Appeal of Tanzania				
Thailand	Supreme Court of Thailand				
Timor-Leste	Supreme Court of Justice				
Togo	Supreme Court of Togo				
Tonga	Court of Appeal of Tonga				
Tonga	Privy Council of Tonga (hereditary estates and titles)				
Trinidad and Tobago	Supreme Court of Trinidad and Tobago				
Trinidad and Tobago	Judicial Committee of the Privy Council (see below)				
Tunisia	Constitutional Court				
Tunisia	Court of Cassation				
Turkey	Constitutional Court of Turkey	Legislative/Executive appointment	12	65	15
Turkey	Court of Cassation	Council of Judges and Prosecutors	12	65	380
Turkey	Council of State	Council of Judges and Prosecutors	12	65	115
Turkey	Court of Jurisdictional Disputes	Appointed by other supreme courts	4	65	13
Turkmenistan	Supreme Court of Turkmenistan				
Tuvalu	High Court of Tuvalu				
Tuvalu	Judicial Committee of the Privy Council (see below)				
Uganda	Constitutional Court of Uganda				
Uganda	Supreme Court of Uganda				
Ukraine	Constitutional Court of Ukraine	Presidential, Parliamentary and Congress of Judges nomination	9	65	18
Ukraine	Supreme Court of Ukraine	Presidential-parliamentary appointment	5-year term, renewable		48
United Arab Emirates	Federal Supreme Court	Presidential appointment			20
United Kingdom	Supreme Court of the United Kingdom	Appointed by the Monarch on the advice of the Prime Minister, following approval of a recommendation by the Lord Chancellor		75	12
United Kingdom	* Scotland; High Court of Justiciary (Scotland–Criminal Appeals concerning violations of the Human Rights Act 1998 may be heard in the Supreme Court alongside civil cases)	Appointment by the Monarch on recommendation of the First Minister of Scotland who receive a recommendation from the Judicial Appointments Board for Scotland		75	36
United Kingdom	Judicial Committee of the Privy Council				
United States	Supreme Court of the United States	Presidential nomination with Senate confirmation		Life tenure	9
Uruguay	Supreme Court of Uruguay	Appointed by the General Assembly by two thirds of the votes.	10		5
Uzbekistan	Supreme Court of Uzbekistan	Constitutional Court of Uzbekistan			
Vanuatu	Supreme Court of Vanuatu				
Vatican City/Holy See	Supreme Court of Vatican City				3
Venezuela	Supreme Tribunal of Justice				
Vietnam	Supreme People's Court of Vietnam				
Yemen	Supreme Court of Yemen				
Zambia	Constitutional Court of Zambia				
Zambia	Supreme Court of Zambia				
Zimbabwe	Constitutional Court of Zimbabwe				
Zimbabwe	Supreme Court of Zimbabwe				

=== States recognised by at least one United Nations member ===
State	Court(s)
Abkhazia	Supreme Court of Abkhazia
Cook Islands	Judicial Committee of the Privy Council (see below)
Kosovo	Supreme Court of Kosovo
Niue	Judicial Committee of the Privy Council (see below)
Northern Cyprus	Supreme Court of Northern Cyprus
Somaliland	Supreme Court of Somaliland
Taiwan	Constitutional Court, Supreme Court of the Republic of China
South Ossetia	Supreme Court of South Ossetia
Western Sahara	Constitutional Council, Supreme Court of the Sahrawi Arab Democratic Republic

=== States not recognised by any United Nations members ===
State	Court(s)
Transnistria	Supreme Court of Transnistria

=== Sui generis entities ===
State	Court(s)
Common Market for Eastern and Southern Africa	COMESA Court of Justice
East African Community	East African Court of Justice
European Union	European Court of Justice
Sovereign Military Order of Malta	Magistral Court of the Sovereign Military Order of Malta

=== International courts ===
There are a number of international courts that are the highest courts of appeal for members of the Organisation of Eastern Caribbean States (OECS) and some of the countries of the Commonwealth of Nations respectively. However, the members of those organisations do sometimes have high courts of their own and their jurisdiction may be limited.

Organisation	Court(s)
Benelux Union	Benelux Court of Justice
Caribbean Community	Caribbean Court of Justice
Commonwealth of Nations	Judicial Committee of the Privy Council
Council of Europe	European Court of Human Rights
European Free Trade Association	EFTA Court
Organisation of Eastern Caribbean States	Eastern Caribbean Supreme Court

== See also ==
- List of national governments
- List of national leaders
- List of national legislatures
- Lists of supreme court justices

Other lists of supreme and constitutional courts:

- List of constitutional courts
- List of subnational constitutional courts
- List of state and territorial supreme courts in the United States
