= High court =

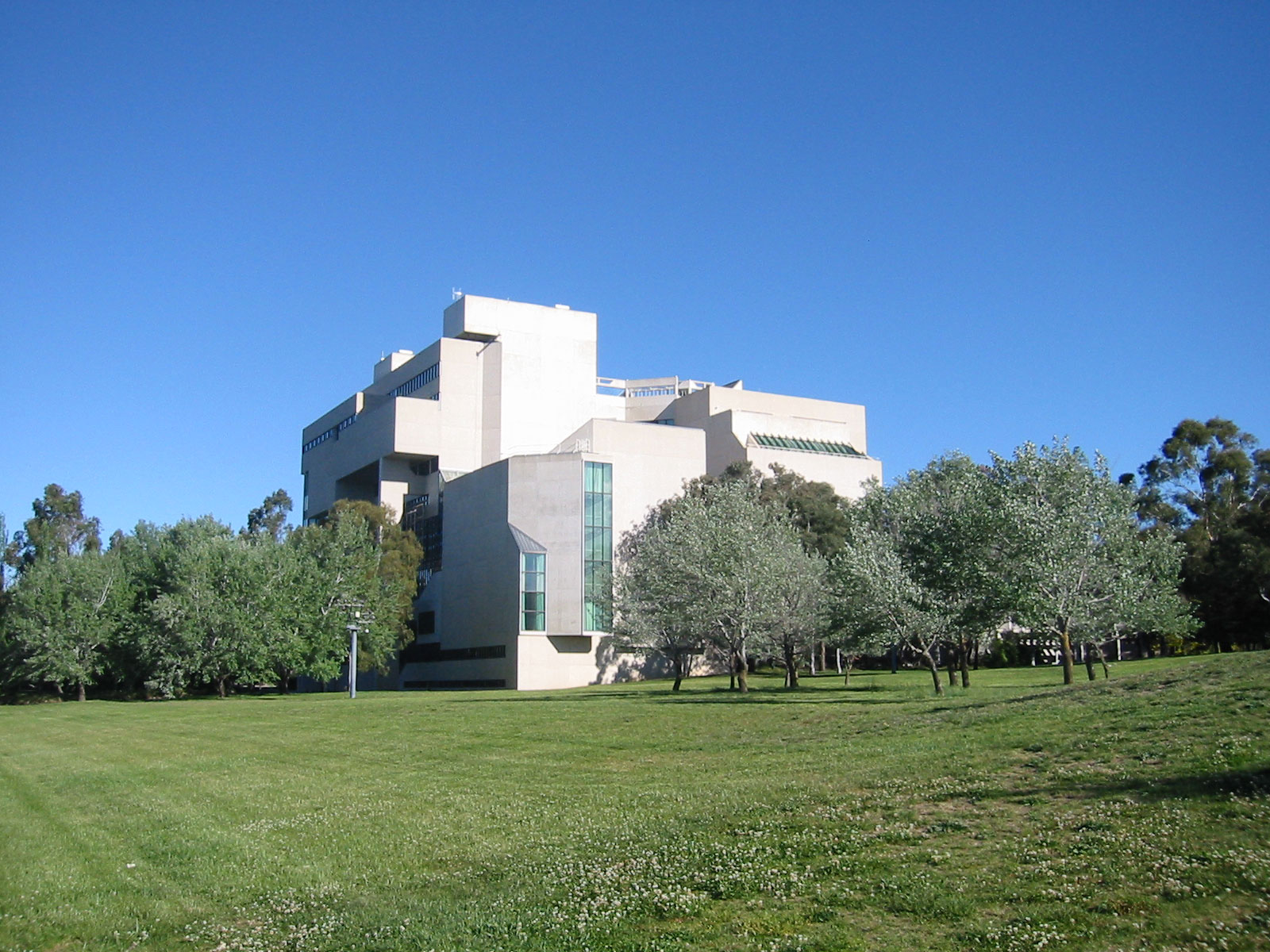
High Court of Australia

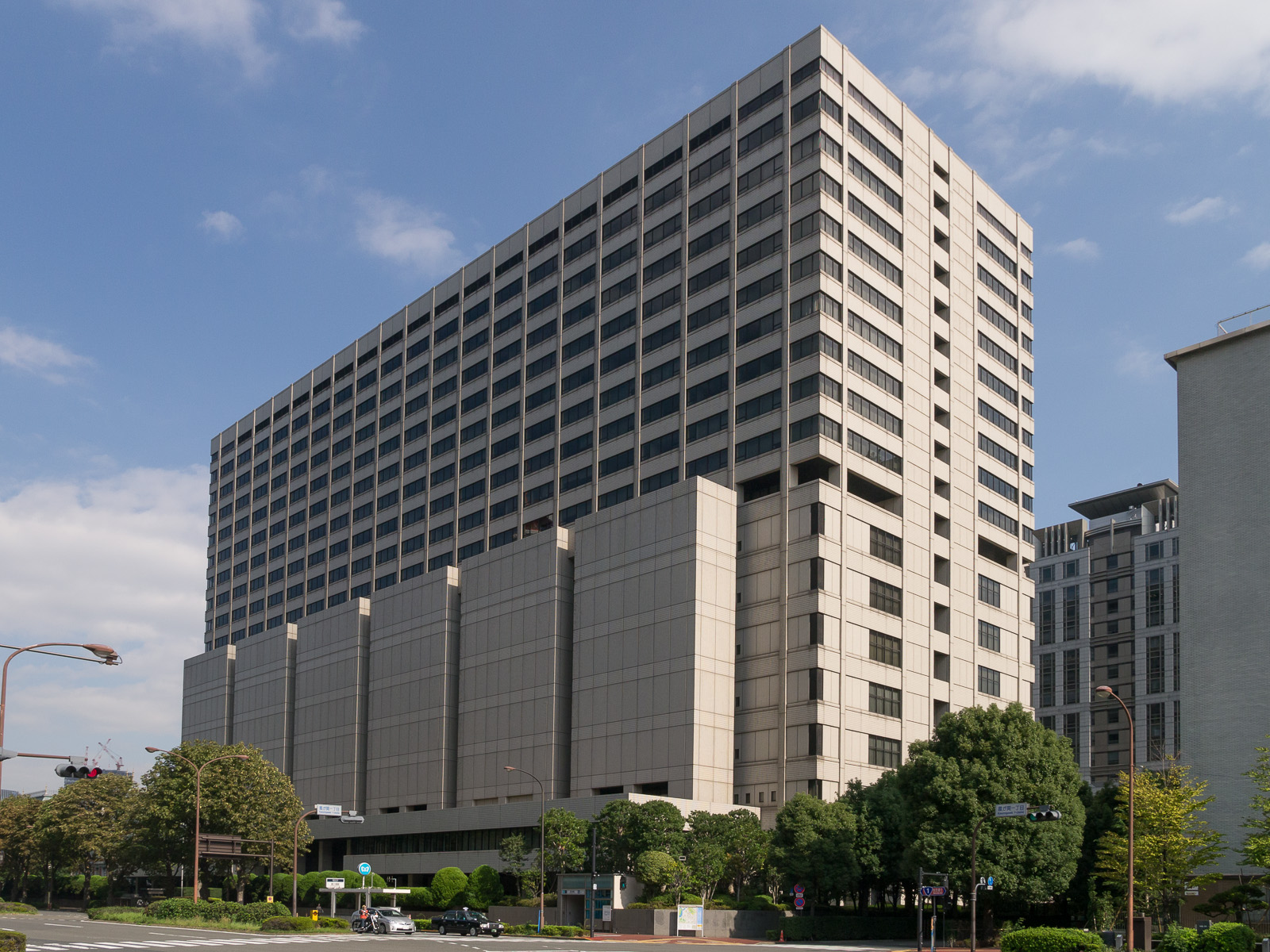
Tokyo High Court

While the Tokyo High Court is a second instance appellate court, which is lower than the Supreme Court of Japan, the High Court of Australia is the national supreme court. Yet both of these courts are named high court.

High court is a name for a variety of courts, often with jurisdiction over the most serious issues.

For countries with a civil law system, the term 'high court' usually refers to an appellate court dealing with first stage of appeal from a trial court, serving as an intermediate body before appeal to the constitutional court, court of cassation, supreme court, or other highest judicial body.

In common law countries, mainly those in the former British Empire, the high court is often the superior trial court, and has plenary original jurisdiction, with lower courts (such as district courts or magistrates' courts) having limited jurisdiction; often, the high court tries the most serious offences such as murder, rape, and terrorism. The Tokyo High Court of Japan is an example of such a body, hearing appeals from district courts (the general trial courts).

Additionally, a high court may serve as an intermediate appellate body before appeal to a supreme or constitutional court. Some jurisdictions, especially federations, may have multiple high courts each with jurisdiction over a particular region. One notable exception is the High Court of Australia, which has both original and appellate jurisdiction in addition to performing constitutional court-like functions. The tasks of a typical Commonwealth high court are handled by the state supreme courts and the Federal Court.

== List of high courts ==
Alphabetically by name of associated country:

- High Court of Australia
- High Court of Bangladesh
- High Court of Bhutan
- High Court of Botswana
- High people's courts in China
- The Eastern and Western high courts of Denmark
- High Court of Justice (England and Wales), presided over by a High Court judge of that jurisdiction
- High Court of Eswatini
- High Court of Fiji
- High Court (France)
- High Court (Germany)
- Supreme Court of Judicature (Guyana)
- High Court of the Hong Kong SAR
- High courts of India, several courts
- High Court (Ireland)
- High Court of Justice (Isle of Man)
- High courts of Japan
- Haute Cour of Jerusalem
- High Court of Kenya
- High Court (Lesotho)
- High Court (Malawi)
- High court (Malaysia), two courts
- High Court (Maldives) (not the Supreme Court)
- High Court (Morocco)
- High Court (Nepal)
- High Court of New Zealand
- High Court (Niue)
- High Court of Justice (Northern Ireland)
- High courts of Pakistan, several courts
- High Court of Cassation and Justice (Romania)
- High Court of Justiciary (Scotland)
- High Court of Singapore
- High Court of Sri Lanka
- High Court of South Africa
- High courts of South Korea
- Spanish high courts of justice, several courts
- High court (Taiwan), several courts
- High Court (Trinidad and Tobago)
- High Court of Tuvalu

== See also ==
- The Roman Rota, and, in exceptional cases, the Apostolic Signatura, are the high courts of the Holy See and Vatican City, under the Pope, who can choose to intervene afterward or beforehand, and has final say
- High Court of Justice
- Superior court
- Appellate court
- Supreme court
- List of supreme courts by country
