= Lists of supreme court justices =

The following are lists of justices of several national Supreme Courts:

- Australia : List of justices of the High Court of Australia
- Canada : List of justices of the Supreme Court of Canada
- Germany : List of justices of the Federal Constitutional Court
- Ghana : List of justices of the Supreme Court of Ghana
- Iceland : List of justices of the Supreme Court of Iceland
- India : List of sitting judges of the Supreme Court of India
- Ireland : List of judges of the Supreme Court of Ireland
- Japan : List of justices of the Supreme Court of Japan
- Nepal : List of sitting judges of the Supreme Court of Nepal
- Pakistan : List of justices of the Supreme Court of Pakistan
- Philippines : List of justices of the Supreme Court of the Philippines
- Russia : List of judges of the Constitutional Court of Russia
- South Korea : List of justices of the Constitutional Court of Korea
- Sri Lanka : List of justices of the Supreme Court of Sri Lanka
- Swiss : List of judges of the Federal Supreme Court of Switzerland
- United Kingdom :
  - List of judges of the Supreme Court of the United Kingdom
  - List of Lords of Appeal in Ordinary
- Scotland : List of senators of the College of Justice
- United States : List of justices of the Supreme Court of the United States
  - List of justices of the Supreme Court of the United States by court composition
  - List of justices of the Supreme Court of the United States by seat

== See also ==
- Supreme court
- List of national supreme courts
