= Noureddine Ghazouani =

Tunisian lawyer and university lecturer

- Born: May 29, 1946 (age 80); Fernana, Tunisia
- Occupations: Lawyer, Educator

Noureddine Ghazouani (born 29 May 1946 at Fernana, Tunisia) is a lawyer and university lecturer.

He is a lawyer in the Court of cassation, where he was called to the bar in Tunis in 1973 and was elected by his peers as Secretary General of the National Order of Tunisian Lawyers for two consecutive terms.

He is a founder of CAG Law Firm.

As well as being a renowned lawyer, since 1974 he has been a lecturer at the Tunis Faculty of Law and Political Science. and at the Magistrates' Higher Institute (French: Institut Supérieur de la Magistrature) and the Legal Professionals' Higher Institute (French: Institut Supérieur de la Profession d’Avocat).

== Youth ==
Ghazouani started his education in Souk el-Arba at the gymnasium (school) Mosbah el-Inoubli. In the same year he achieved his certificate of completion of primary education, his sixth-stage Ministry and sixth-stage French Mission exams.

Because of these excellent results, he was sent to the French lycée at Mutuelleville to study for a French diploma, and then to the mixed-sex lycée at Bizerte for his Tunisian diploma. Although his diploma was awarded by the highly regarded University of Ez-Zitouna, his father chose to enrol him into the French lycée, against the advice of the governor of Souk el-Arba, who suggested he sever all ties with the French colonial empire. Unfortunately, the French lycée at Mutuelleville did not accept domestic students, so he was required to go to Bizerte.

To be near his family, he transferred to a secondary college in Souk el-Arba. After two years of study, he then went to the mixed-sex lycée at Béja, where he majored in Literary Letters and the following year a baccalauréat in Philosophy.

== Early career ==
Ghazouni enrolled at the Tunis Faculty of Law and Political Science and at the same time at the Tunis National School of Administration (ENA), the same year (1971) passing the entrance exams in private law and the Diploma of the ENA.

He had been studying towards a licence in practice for public law, which he passed with merit in 1970. But on results day he was summoned by the Dean of the Faculty of Law and Economics, Professor Chedly Ayari, who informed him that at his teachers' request he had been shifted to study private law. This change of plan was approved by the Examinations Office, who thought he would get better marks in private law. Once again there was a change of plan.

However, this provided another challenge because the Tunisian law schools did not study to a high enough level. Ghazouni opted to go to the Panthéon-Assas University in Paris ("Paris II") where he obtained a Doctoral Diploma of Higher Studies (DES) in general private law.

After this, he studied for a diploma in Criminal Science. Puis, il prépare avec succès le diplôme d’études approfondies en Sciences Criminelles. During his first year of studies he was forced to return to Tunisia to finance his studies. The second year proved easier, because he could work at small jobs to earn a living.

In 1987, Ghazouani was awarded the State Doctorate in Law by the famous professor Jean Pradel. His teaching career was assured by having doctorates in all branches of the law.

== Lawyer ==
Ghazouani is a lawyer before the Court of Cassation, being called to the bar in Tunis in 1973. He is a co-founder of the C. A. G. Law firm. He specialises in business law, commercial arbitration law and is one of the best-known criminal lawyers.

As a young lawyer, he defended the rebel Ezzeddine Cherif, in the famous case of the Gafsa Uprising. He was lawyer for members of the Tunisian General Labour Union (UGTT) during the events of 1978, where a group led by Habib Achour was brought before the State National Court of Security by President Habib Bourguiba. Several times he was also lawyer for the Islamist movement.

On the international stage, he has advocated for large Tunisian businesses in international arbitration at Geneva, Milan and Paris. He is also a retained lawyer for the Libyan State, and for the Qatar Friendship Fund (QFF).

== Educator ==
Since 1973, Ghazouani has been the Chairman of the Board at the Faculty of Law and Political Science in Tunis. He is the author of courses on international arbitration (doctoral studies) and on civil procedure, commercial law, criminal law, and an introduction to civil law.

He has examined doctoral theses and post-doctoral studies.

Between 1987 and 2003 he was a professor at the Higher Institute of Magistrature, and is now a professor at the Higher Institute for the Legal Profession.

== Other responsibilities ==
Ghazouani has been Président de l’Association Tunisienne de l’Arbitrage et des Procédures Judiciaires since its creation in the 1990s. He participates in international and domestic arbitration in Tunisia and abroad, as a member of the Arbitration Tribunal.

Ghazouani has organised several international conferences and symposia both nationally and internationally, and has participated in numerous conferences on different topics.

He has taken part in several preparatory commissions for law under the Ministry of Justice and took part in the Tuniso-Libyan Commission for the unification of legislation in 1989.

He has been a member of the Commission for the law concerning the conduct of the lawyers, which was stayed but has re-emerged after the 2011 revolution.

In 2012 he was charged by the Tunisian President to chair the National Commission on reform of the civil law.

== Publications ==
Ghazouani is the author of many publications in specialist journals, on themes including:

- Les conditions objectives de la convention d’arbitrage ("Objective conditions on the conventions for arbitrage")
- L’Exequatur des jugements étrangers ("Acknowledgement of foreign judgments")
- La nouvelle juridiction commerciale en Tunisie ("The new commercial law in Tunisia")
- La propriété intellectuelle dans les pays du Maghreb ("Intellectual property in the state of Maghreb")
- Réflexions sur la sanction de la vente de la chose d’autrui ("Reflections on sales sanctions and third-party property")
- Le tiers et le procès civil ("The tiers and processes of civil law")
- Commentaire de la loi du 01/09/1986 portant modification des dispositions du Code des Procédures Civiles et Commerciales (CPCC) ("Commentary on the law of 1 September 1986 concerning modification of the Civil Codes and Procedures")
- Les nouvelles fonctions de la Cour de Cassation ("New roles of the Court of Cassation")
- Les règles de procédure civile et commerciale dans le Code des obligations et des contrats ("Rules and commercial and civil procedure in the law of tort and contract")

He is author of a book on civil and commercial procedure (2011) and a commentary on the same (1996).
