= Supreme Court of Judicature =

Supreme Court of Judicature may refer to:

- Supreme Court of Judicature (Barbados). Supreme Court of Barbados
- Supreme Court of Judicature (Guyana), Supreme Court of Guyana
- Supreme Court of Judicature (Ireland), the supreme court in Ireland from 1877 to 1920
- Supreme Court of Judicature, until 2009 the title of the superior court in Northern Ireland; see Courts of Northern Ireland
- Senior Courts of England and Wales, formerly known as "the Supreme Court of Judicature"
- Supreme Court of Judicature of Japan, existed from 1875 to 1946
- Court of Judicature of Northern Ireland, formerly known as "the Supreme Court of Judicature"

== See also ==
- Supreme Court of Civil Judicature (New South Wales)
- Supreme Court of Judicature at Fort William (Bengal)
