= Life rank =

Life rank may refer to:

- Life peer, a nobility rank for life
- Life tenure, a political rank acquired for life
- Life Scout, a rank in the Boy Scouts of America
