= List of justices of the Supreme Court of the United States by court composition =

The Supreme Court of the United States is the highest ranking judicial body in the United States. Established by Article III of the Constitution, the detailed structure of the court was laid down by the 1st United States Congress in 1789. Congress specified the Court's original and appellate jurisdiction, created 13 judicial districts, and fixed the initial size of the Supreme Court. The number of justices on the Supreme Court was changed six times before settling at the present total of nine in 1869. A total of 115 persons have served on the Supreme Court since 1789. Justices have life tenure, and so they serve until they die in office, resign or retire, or are impeached and removed from office.

The graphical timeline below lists the justices of the Supreme Court of the United States by court composition. As Supreme Court historians categorize eras in the court's history by the name of the presiding chief justice, the timeline is divided into sections, according to who was chief justice at the time. The incumbent associate justices at the start of each court era are listed in order of their seniority at that time. Justices joining the court during an era are listed below them in the order of their appointment. The bars are color-coded to show the changes in seniority among the justices during each era.

== List of justices ==
=== Jay Court ===
The Jay Court era, under the leadership of John Jay, lasted from February 2, 1790, when the court held its inaugural session, to June 29, 1795. The Judiciary Act of 1789 set the number of Supreme Court justices at six: one chief justice and five associate justices. Eight justices served during this court.

Note: The red vertical line denotes September 24, 1789, the date on which the U.S. federal judiciary was established by Congress. The green vertical line denotes February 2, 1790, the date on which the U.S. Supreme Court convened for the first time. Seniority key:
Chief justice • 1st assoc. justice • 2nd assoc. justice • 3rd assoc. justice • 4th assoc. justice • 5th assoc justice

=== Rutledge Court ===
The Rutledge Court era, under the leadership of John Rutledge, lasted from August 12, 1795, when Rutledge received a recess appointment from President Washington to serve as chief justice, through late-December 1795, following the U.S. Senate's rejection of his nomination to a lifetime appointment to the chief justice position. Rutledge had previously served on the Court from 1790 to 1791 as an associate justice. Six justices served during this court.

Seniority key:
Chief justice • 1st assoc. justice • 2nd assoc. justice • 3rd assoc. justice • 4th assoc. justice • 5th assoc justice

=== Ellsworth Court ===
The Ellsworth Court era, under the leadership of Oliver Ellsworth, lasted from March 8, 1796 to December 15, 1800. Eight justices served during this court.

Seniority key:
Chief justice • 1st assoc. justice • 2nd assoc. justice • 3rd assoc. justice • 4th assoc. justice • 5th assoc justice

=== Marshall Court ===
The Marshall Court era lasted from February 4, 1801 to July 6, 1835. In 1807, Congress passed the Seventh Circuit Act, which added a sixth associate justice to the Supreme Court; 16 justices served during this court.

Note: + denotes new seat Seniority key:
Chief justice • 1st assoc. justice • 2nd assoc. justice • 3rd assoc. justice • 4th assoc. justice • 5th assoc justice • 6th assoc. justice

=== Taney Court ===
The Taney Court era, under the leadership of Roger Taney, lasted from March 28, 1836 to October 12, 1864. Two associate justice seats were added to the court in 1837, as a result of the Eighth and Ninth Circuits Act; another one was added in 1863, by the Tenth Circuit Act, enlarging the court to 10 justices; 20 justices served during this court.

Note: + denotes new seat Seniority key:
Chief justice • 1st assoc. justice • 2nd assoc. justice • 3rd assoc. justice • 4th assoc. justice • 5th assoc justice • 6th assoc. justice • 7th assoc. justice • 8th assoc. justice • 9th assoc. justice

=== Chase Court ===
The Chase Court era, under the leadership of Salmon P. Chase, lasted from December 15, 1864 to May 7, 1873. Two associate justice seats were abolished as a result of the Judicial Circuits Act of 1866, which provided for the gradual elimination of seats on the court from ten to seven justices. The size of the court was later changed to nine members through the Judiciary Act of 1869. 13 justices served during this court.

Note: + denotes new seat; − denotes abolished seat Seniority key:
Chief justice • 1st assoc. justice • 2nd assoc. justice • 3rd assoc. justice • 4th assoc. justice • 5th assoc justice • 6th assoc. justice • 7th assoc. justice • 8th assoc. justice • 9th assoc. justice

=== Waite Court ===
The Waite Court era, under the leadership of Morrison Waite, lasted from March 4, 1874 to March 23, 1888; 15 justices served during this court.

Seniority key:
Chief justice • 1st assoc. justice • 2nd assoc. justice • 3rd assoc. justice • 4th assoc. justice • 5th assoc justice • 6th assoc. justice • 7th assoc. justice • 8th assoc. justice

=== Fuller Court ===
The Fuller Court era, under the leadership of Melville Fuller, lasted from October 10, 1888 to July 4, 1910; 20 justices served during this court.

Seniority key:
Chief justice • 1st assoc. justice • 2nd assoc. justice • 3rd assoc. justice • 4th assoc. justice • 5th assoc justice • 6th assoc. justice • 7th assoc. justice • 8th assoc. justice

=== White Court ===
The White Court era, under the leadership of Edward Douglass White, lasted from December 19, 1910 to May 19, 1921. White had been an associate Supreme Court justice for 16 years, 282 days at the time of his appointment as chief justice; 13 justices served during this court.

Seniority key:
Chief justice • 1st assoc. justice • 2nd assoc. justice • 3rd assoc. justice • 4th assoc. justice • 5th assoc justice • 6th assoc. justice • 7th assoc. justice • 8th assoc. justice

=== Taft Court ===
The Taft Court era, under the leadership of William Howard Taft, lasted from July 11, 1921 to February 3, 1930; 13 justices served during this court. Taft was also the nation's 27th president (1909–13), and is the only person to serve as both President of the United States and Chief Justice of the United States.

Seniority key:
Chief justice • 1st assoc. justice • 2nd assoc. justice • 3rd assoc. justice • 4th assoc. justice • 5th assoc justice • 6th assoc. justice • 7th assoc. justice • 8th assoc. justice

=== Hughes Court ===
The Hughes Court era, under the leadership of Charles Evans Hughes, lasted from February 24, 1930 to June 30, 1941. Hughes had previously served on the Court from 1910 to 1916 as an associate justice; 16 justices served during this court.

Seniority key:
Chief justice • 1st assoc. justice • 2nd assoc. justice • 3rd assoc. justice • 4th assoc. justice • 5th assoc justice • 6th assoc. justice • 7th assoc. justice • 8th assoc. justice

=== Stone Court ===
The Stone Court era, under the leadership of Harlan F. Stone, lasted from July 3, 1941 to April 22, 1946. Stone had been an associate Supreme Court justice for 16 years, 123 days at the time of his appointment as chief justice; 11 justices served during this court.

Seniority key:
Chief justice • 1st assoc. justice • 2nd assoc. justice • 3rd assoc. justice • 4th assoc. justice • 5th assoc justice • 6th assoc. justice • 7th assoc. justice • 8th assoc. justice

=== Vinson Court ===
The Vinson Court era, under the leadership of Fred M. Vinson, lasted from June 24, 1946 to September 8, 1953: 11 justices served during this court.

Seniority key:
Chief justice • 1st assoc. justice • 2nd assoc. justice • 3rd assoc. justice • 4th assoc. justice • 5th assoc justice • 6th assoc. justice • 7th assoc. justice • 8th assoc. justice

=== Warren Court ===
The Warren Court era, under the leadership of Earl Warren, lasted from October 5, 1953, after Warren received a recess appointment from President Eisenhower to serve as chief justice, to June 23, 1969; 17 justices served during this court.

Seniority key:
Chief justice • 1st assoc. justice • 2nd assoc. justice • 3rd assoc. justice • 4th assoc. justice • 5th assoc justice • 6th assoc. justice • 7th assoc. justice • 8th assoc. justice

=== Burger Court ===
The Burger Court era, under the leadership of Warren E. Burger, lasted from June 23, 1969 to September 26, 1986; 13 justices served during this court.

Seniority key:
Chief justice • 1st assoc. justice • 2nd assoc. justice • 3rd assoc. justice • 4th assoc. justice • 5th assoc justice • 6th assoc. justice • 7th assoc. justice • 8th assoc. justice

=== Rehnquist Court ===
The Rehnquist Court era, under the leadership of William Rehnquist, lasted from September 26, 1986 to September 3, 2005. Rehnquist had been an associate Supreme Court justice for 14 years, 285 days at the time of his appointment as chief justice; 14 justices served during this court.

Seniority key:
Chief justice • 1st assoc. justice • 2nd assoc. justice • 3rd assoc. justice • 4th assoc. justice • 5th assoc justice • 6th assoc. justice • 7th assoc. justice • 8th assoc. justice

=== Roberts Court ===
The Roberts Court era, under the leadership of John Roberts, began September 29, 2005, and is ongoing; 16 justices have served during this court.

Note: The bronze vertical line denotes "now" (October 2026). Seniority key:
Chief justice • 1st assoc. justice • 2nd assoc. justice • 3rd assoc. justice • 4th assoc. justice • 5th assoc justice • 6th assoc. justice • 7th assoc. justice • 8th assoc. justice

== See also ==
- History of the Supreme Court of the United States
- Timeline of justices, graphical timeline depicting the progression of the justices (justices to justice succession) on the Supreme Court
