= List of justices of the Supreme Court of the United States =

The Supreme Court of the United States is the highest-ranking judicial body in the United States. Its membership, as set by the Judiciary Act of 1869, consists of the chief justice of the United States and eight associate justices, any six of whom constitute a quorum. Article II, Section 2, Clause 2 of the Constitution grants plenary power to the president of the United States to nominate, and with the advice and consent of the United States Senate, appoint justices to the Supreme Court; justices have life tenure.

== Background ==
The Supreme Court was created by Article III of the United States Constitution, which stipulates that the "judicial power of the United States, shall be vested in one Supreme Court," and was organized by the 1st United States Congress. Through the Judiciary Act of 1789, Congress specified the Court's original and appellate jurisdiction, created thirteen judicial districts, and fixed the number of justices at six (one chief justice and five associate justices).

Since 1789, Congress has occasionally altered the size of the Supreme Court, historically in response to the country's own expansion in size. An 1801 act would have decreased the Court's size to five members upon its next vacancy. However, an 1802 act negated the effects of the 1801 act upon the Court before any such vacancy occurred, maintaining the Court's size at six members. Later legislation increased its size to seven members in 1807, to nine in 1837, and to ten in 1863. An 1866 act was to have reduced the Court's size from ten members to seven upon vacancies, and two of three vacancies did occur. However, before a third vacancy occurred, the Judiciary Act of 1869 intervened, changing the Court's size to nine members, where it has remained ever since.

While the justices of the Supreme Court are appointed for life, many have retired or resigned. Beginning in the early 20th century, many justices who left the Court voluntarily did so by retiring from the Court without leaving the federal judiciary altogether. A retired justice, according to the United States Code, is no longer a member of the Supreme Court, but remains eligible to serve by designation as a judge of a U.S. Court of Appeals or District Court, and many retired justices have served in these capacities. Historically, the average length of service on the Court has been less than 15 years. However, since 1970 the average length of service has increased to about 26 years.

== List of justices ==
Since the Supreme Court was established in 1789, 116 people have served on the Court. The length of service on the Court for the 107 non-incumbent justices ranges from William O. Douglas's 36 years, 209 days to John Rutledge's 1 year, 18 days as associate justice and, separated by a period of years off the Court, his 138 days as chief justice. As of October 28, 2026, the length of service for the nine incumbent justices ranges from Clarence Thomas's 35 years, 5 days to Ketanji Brown Jackson's 4 years, 120 days. Five individuals, who were confirmed for associate justice, were later appointed chief justice separately: John Rutledge, (Note: Served on the Supreme Court twice: first as associate justice and then, after a period of years off the Court, as chief justice.) Edward Douglass White, (Note: Elevated from associate justice to chief justice while serving on the Supreme Court. Such appointments are subject to a separate confirmation process.) Charles Evans Hughes, Harlan F. Stone and William Rehnquist. While listed twice, each of them has been assigned only one index number. The justices of the Supreme Court are listed below.

No.	Name (birth–death)	State (Note: State or federal district of residence at the time of appointment. For example, in 1971, Rehnquist was appointed from Arizona, but in 1986, when elevated to chief justice, he was appointed from Virginia.)	Position	Succeeded	Confirmation Vote Date	Term (Note: The start date given for each justice is the day they took the prescribed judicial oath of office, with the end date being the date of the justice's death, resignation, or retirement.)	Duration	Appointer
1	John Jay (1745–1829)	NY	Chief; Justice	Inaugural	September 26, 1789 (Acclamation)	October 19, 1789 – June 29, 1795 (Resigned)	5 years, 253 days	George Washington
2	John Rutledge (1739–1800)	SC	Associate; Justice	Inaugural	September 26, 1789 (Acclamation)	February 15, 1790 (Note: While Justice Wilson was the first to take the oath of office, § 1 of the Judiciary Act of 1789 prescribes precedence of the associate justices by the dates their judicial commissions bear. This rule of precedence exists to this day, codified at Title 28, U.S. Code § 4. The commissions of the first four associate justices bear the following dates: Rutledge, Sept. 26, 1789; Cushing, Sept. ;27; Wilson, Sept. ;29; and Blair, Sept. 30.) – March 5, 1791 (Resigned)	1 year, 18 days (Note: John Rutledge's total duration on the Court was 1 year, 156 days.)	George Washington
3	William Cushing (1732–1810)	MA	Associate; Justice	Inaugural	September 26, 1789 (Acclamation)	February 2, 1790 – September 13, 1810 (Died)	20 years, 223 days	George Washington
4	James Wilson (1742–1798)	PA	Associate; Justice	Inaugural	September 26, 1789 (Acclamation)	October 5, 1789 – August 21, 1798 (Died)	8 years, 320 days	George Washington
5	John Blair (1732–1800)	VA	Associate; Justice	Inaugural	September 26, 1789 (Acclamation)	February 2, 1790 – October 25, 1795 (Resigned)	5 years, 265 days	George Washington
6	James Iredell (1751–1799)	NC	Associate; Justice	Inaugural	February 10, 1790 (Acclamation)	May 12, 1790 – October 20, 1799 (Died)	9 years, 161 days	George Washington
7	Thomas Johnson (1732–1819)	MD	Associate; Justice	J. Rutledge	November 7, 1791 (Acclamation)	September 19, 1791 (Note: Recess appointment. Note: the date on which the justice took the judicial oath is here used as the date of the beginning of their service, not the date of the recess appointment.) – January 16, 1793 (Resigned)	1 year, 119 days	George Washington
8	William Paterson (1745–1806)	NJ	Associate; Justice	T. Johnson	March 4, 1793 (Acclamation)	March 11, 1793 – September 9, 1806 (Died)	13 years, 181 days	George Washington
2	John Rutledge (1739–1800)	SC	Chief; Justice	Jay	December 15, 1795 (10–14) (Note: This was the first Supreme Court nomination to be rejected by the Senate. Rutledge remains the only "recess appointed" justice not to be subsequently confirmed by the Senate.)	August 12, 1795 – December 15, 1795 (Resigned, nomination having been rejected)	138 days	George Washington
9	Samuel Chase (Note: Was impeached, but not convicted, and remained in office.) (1741–1811)	MD	Associate; Justice	Blair	January 27, 1796 (Acclamation)	February 4, 1796 – June 19, 1811 (Died)	15 years, 135 days	George Washington
10	Oliver Ellsworth (1745–1807)	CT	Chief; Justice	J. Rutledge	March 4, 1796 (21–1)	March 8, 1796 – December 15, 1800 (Resigned)	4 years, 282 days	George Washington
11	Bushrod Washington (1762–1829)	VA	Associate; Justice	Wilson	December 20, 1798 (Acclamation)	November 9, 1798 – November 26, 1829 (Died)	31 years, 17 days	John Adams
12	Alfred Moore (1755–1810)	NC	Associate; Justice	Iredell	December 9, 1799 (Acclamation)	April 21, 1800 – January 26, 1804 (Resigned)	3 years, 280 days	John Adams
13	John Marshall (1755–1835)	VA	Chief; Justice	Ellsworth	January 27, 1801 (Acclamation)	February 4, 1801 – July 6, 1835 (Died)	34 years, 152 days	John Adams
14	William Johnson (1771–1834)	SC	Associate; Justice	Moore	March 24, 1804 (Acclamation)	May 7, 1804 – August 4, 1834 (Died)	30 years, 89 days	Thomas Jefferson
15	Henry Brockholst Livingston (1757–1823)	NY	Associate; Justice	Paterson	December 17, 1806 (Acclamation)	January 20, 1807 – March 18, 1823 (Died)	16 years, 57 days	Thomas Jefferson
16	Thomas Todd (1765–1826)	KY	Associate; Justice	New seat	March 2, 1807 (Acclamation)	May 4, 1807 – February 7, 1826 (Died)	18 years, 279 days	Thomas Jefferson
17	Gabriel Duvall (1752–1844)	MD	Associate; Justice	S. Chase	November 18, 1811 (Acclamation)	November 23, 1811 – January 14, 1835 (Resigned)	23 years, 50 days	James Madison
18	Joseph Story (1779–1845)	MA	Associate; Justice	Cushing	November 18, 1811 (Acclamation)	February 3, 1812 – September 10, 1845 (Died)	33 years, 219 days	James Madison
19	Smith Thompson (1768–1843)	NY	Associate; Justice	Livingston	December 9, 1823 (Acclamation)	September 1, 1823 – December 18, 1843 (Died)	20 years, 108 days	James Monroe
20	Robert Trimble (1776–1828)	KY	Associate; Justice	Todd	May 9, 1826 (25–5)	June 16, 1826 – August 25, 1828 (Died)	2 years, 70 days	John Quincy Adams
21	John McLean (1785–1861)	OH	Associate; Justice	Trimble	March 7, 1829 (Acclamation)	March 12, 1829 – April 4, 1861 (Died)	32 years, 23 days	Andrew Jackson
22	Henry Baldwin (1780–1844)	PA	Associate; Justice	Washington	January 6, 1830 (41–2)	January 18, 1830 – April 21, 1844 (Died)	14 years, 94 days	Andrew Jackson
23	James M. Wayne (1790–1867)	GA	Associate; Justice	W. Johnson	January 9, 1835 (Acclamation)	January 14, 1835 – July 5, 1867 (Died)	32 years, 172 days	Andrew Jackson
24	Roger B. Taney (1777–1864)	MD	Chief; Justice	J. Marshall	March 15, 1836 (29–15)	March 28, 1836 – October 12, 1864 (Died)	28 years, 198 days	Andrew Jackson
25	Philip P. Barbour (1783–1841)	VA	Associate; Justice	Duvall	March 15, 1836 (30–11)	May 12, 1836 – February 25, 1841 (Died)	4 years, 289 days	Andrew Jackson
26	John Catron (1786–1865)	TN	Associate; Justice	New seat	March 8, 1837 (28–15)	May 1, 1837 – May 30, 1865 (Died)	28 years, 29 days	Andrew Jackson
27	John McKinley (1780–1852)	AL	Associate; Justice	New seat	September 25, 1837 (Acclamation)	January 9, 1838 – July 19, 1852 (Died)	14 years, 192 days	Martin Van Buren
28	Peter V. Daniel (1784–1860)	VA	Associate; Justice	Barbour	March 2, 1841 (25–5)	January 10, 1842 – May 31, 1860 (Died)	18 years, 142 days	Martin Van Buren
29	Samuel Nelson (1792–1873)	NY	Associate; Justice	Thompson	February 14, 1845 (Acclamation)	February 27, 1845 – November 28, 1872 (Retired)	27 years, 275 days	John Tyler
30	Levi Woodbury (1789–1851)	NH	Associate; Justice	Story	January 31, 1846 (Acclamation)	September 23, 1845 – September 4, 1851 (Died)	5 years, 346 days	James K. Polk
31	Robert Cooper Grier (1794–1870)	PA	Associate; Justice	Baldwin	August 4, 1846 (Acclamation)	August 10, 1846 – January 31, 1870 (Retired)	23 years, 174 days	James K. Polk
32	Benjamin Robbins Curtis (1809–1874)	MA	Associate; Justice	Woodbury	December 20, 1851 (Acclamation)	October 10, 1851 – September 30, 1857 (Resigned)	5 years, 355 days	Millard Fillmore
33	John Archibald Campbell (1811–1889)	AL	Associate; Justice	McKinley	March 22, 1853 (Acclamation)	April 11, 1853 – April 30, 1861 (Resigned)	8 years, 19 days	Franklin Pierce
34	Nathan Clifford (1803–1881)	ME	Associate; Justice	Curtis	January 12, 1858 (26–23)	January 21, 1858 – July 25, 1881 (Died)	23 years, 185 days	James Buchanan
35	Noah Haynes Swayne (1804–1884)	OH	Associate; Justice	McLean	January 24, 1862 (38–1)	January 27, 1862 – January 24, 1881 (Retired)	18 years, 363 days	Abraham Lincoln
36	Samuel Freeman Miller (1816–1890)	IA	Associate; Justice	Daniel	July 16, 1862 (Acclamation)	July 21, 1862 – October 13, 1890 (Died)	28 years, 84 days	Abraham Lincoln
37	David Davis (1815–1886)	IL	Associate; Justice	Campbell	December 8, 1862 (Acclamation)	December 10, 1862 – March 4, 1877 (Resigned)	14 years, 84 days	Abraham Lincoln
38	Stephen Johnson Field (1816–1899)	CA	Associate; Justice	New seat	March 10, 1863 (Acclamation)	May 20, 1863 – December 1, 1897 (Retired)	34 years, 195 days	Abraham Lincoln
39	Salmon P. Chase (1808–1873)	OH	Chief; Justice	Taney	December 6, 1864 (Acclamation)	December 15, 1864 – May 7, 1873 (Died)	8 years, 143 days	Abraham Lincoln
40	William Strong (1808–1895)	PA	Associate; Justice	Grier	February 18, 1870 (No vote recorded)	March 14, 1870 – December 14, 1880 (Retired)	10 years, 275 days	Ulysses S. Grant
41	Joseph P. Bradley (1813–1892)	NJ	Associate; Justice	New seat	March 21, 1870 (46–9)	March 23, 1870 – January 22, 1892 (Died)	21 years, 305 days	Ulysses S. Grant
42	Ward Hunt (1810–1886)	NY	Associate; Justice	Nelson	December 11, 1872 (Acclamation)	January 9, 1873 – January 27, 1882 (Retired)	9 years, 18 days	Ulysses S. Grant
43	Morrison Waite (1816–1888)	OH	Chief; Justice	S. P. Chase	January 21, 1874 (63–0)	March 4, 1874 – March 23, 1888 (Died)	14 years, 19 days	Ulysses S. Grant
44	John Marshall Harlan (1833–1911)	KY	Associate; Justice	Davis	November 29, 1877 (Acclamation)	December 10, 1877 – October 14, 1911 (Died)	33 years, 308 days	Rutherford B. Hayes
45	William Burnham Woods (1824–1887)	GA	Associate; Justice	Strong	December 21, 1880 (39–8)	January 5, 1881 – May 14, 1887 (Died)	6 years, 129 days	Rutherford B. Hayes
46	Stanley Matthews (1824–1889)	OH	Associate; Justice	Swayne	May 12, 1881 (24–23)	May 17, 1881 – March 22, 1889 (Died)	7 years, 309 days	James A. Garfield
47	Horace Gray (1828–1902)	MA	Associate; Justice	Clifford	December 20, 1881 (51–5)	January 9, 1882 – September 15, 1902 (Died)	20 years, 249 days	Chester A. Arthur
48	Samuel Blatchford (1820–1893)	NY	Associate; Justice	Hunt	March 22, 1882 (Acclamation)	April 3, 1882 – July 7, 1893 (Died)	11 years, 95 days	Chester A. Arthur
49	Lucius Quintus Cincinnatus Lamar (1825–1893)	MS	Associate; Justice	Woods	January 16, 1888 (32–28)	January 18, 1888 – January 23, 1893 (Died)	5 years, 5 days	Grover Cleveland
50	Melville Fuller (1833–1910)	IL	Chief; Justice	Waite	July 20, 1888 (41–20)	October 8, 1888 – July 4, 1910 (Died)	21 years, 269 days	Grover Cleveland
51	David J. Brewer (1837–1910)	KS	Associate; Justice	Matthews	December 18, 1889 (53–11)	January 6, 1890 – March 28, 1910 (Died)	20 years, 81 days	Benjamin Harrison
52	Henry Billings Brown (1836–1913)	MI	Associate; Justice	Miller	December 29, 1890 (Acclamation)	January 5, 1891 – May 28, 1906 (Retired)	15 years, 143 days	Benjamin Harrison
53	George Shiras Jr. (1832–1924)	PA	Associate; Justice	Bradley	July 26, 1892 (Acclamation)	October 10, 1892 – February 23, 1903 (Retired)	10 years, 136 days	Benjamin Harrison
54	Howell E. Jackson (1832–1895)	TN	Associate; Justice	L. Lamar	February 18, 1893 (Acclamation)	March 4, 1893 – August 8, 1895 (Died)	2 years, 157 days	Benjamin Harrison
55	Edward Douglass White (1845–1921)	LA	Associate; Justice	Blatchford	February 19, 1894 (Acclamation)	March 12, 1894 – December 18, 1910 (Continued as chief justice)	16 years, 281 days (Note: Edward White's total duration on the Court was 27 years, 67 days.)	Grover Cleveland
56	Rufus W. Peckham (1838–1909)	NY	Associate; Justice	H. Jackson	December 9, 1895 (Acclamation)	January 6, 1896 – October 24, 1909 (Died)	13 years, 291 days	Grover Cleveland
57	Joseph McKenna (1843–1926)	CA	Associate; Justice (Note: Acted as chief justice under 36 Stat. 1152, May 19 – July 11, 1921.)	Field	January 21, 1898 (Acclamation)	January 26, 1898 – January 5, 1925 (Retired)	26 years, 345 days	William McKinley
58	Oliver Wendell Holmes Jr. (1841–1935)	MA	Associate; Justice (Note: Acted as chief justice under 36 Stat. 1152, February 3–24, 1930.)	Gray	December 4, 1902 (Acclamation)	December 8, 1902 – January 12, 1932 (Retired)	29 years, 35 days	Theodore Roosevelt
59	William R. Day (1849–1923)	OH	Associate; Justice	Shiras	February 23, 1903 (Acclamation)	March 2, 1903 – November 13, 1922 (Retired)	19 years, 256 days	Theodore Roosevelt
60	William Henry Moody (1853–1917)	MA	Associate; Justice	Brown	December 12, 1906 (Acclamation)	December 17, 1906 – November 20, 1910 (Retired)	3 years, 338 days	Theodore Roosevelt
61	Horace Harmon Lurton (1844–1914)	TN	Associate; Justice	Peckham	December 20, 1909 (Acclamation)	January 3, 1910 – July 12, 1914 (Died)	4 years, 190 days	William Howard Taft
62	Charles Evans Hughes (1862–1948)	NY	Associate; Justice	Brewer	May 2, 1910 (Acclamation)	October 10, 1910 – June 10, 1916 (Resigned)	5 years, 244 days (Note: Charles Hughes's total duration on the Court was 17 years, 5 days.)	William Howard Taft
55	Edward Douglass White (1845–1921)	LA	Chief; Justice	Fuller	December 12, 1910 (Acclamation)	December 19, 1910 – May 19, 1921 (Died)	10 years, 151 days	William Howard Taft
63	Willis Van Devanter (1859–1941)	WY	Associate; Justice	E. D. White	December 15, 1910 (Acclamation)	January 3, 1911 (Note: While Willis Van Devanter and Joseph Rucker Lamar were sworn in as associate justice on the same date, their seniority (precedence) on the Supreme Court was determined by the dates borne on their judicial commissions—President Taft issued the judicial commission of Justice Van Devanter on Dec. 16, 1910, bearing that date; the commission of Justice Lamar issued the next day, Dec. 17.) – June 2, 1937 (Retired)	26 years, 150 days	William Howard Taft
64	Joseph Rucker Lamar (1857–1916)	GA	Associate; Justice	Moody	December 15, 1910 (Acclamation)	January 3, 1911 – January 2, 1916 (Died)	4 years, 364 days	William Howard Taft
65	Mahlon Pitney (1858–1924)	NJ	Associate; Justice	J. Harlan	March 13, 1912 (50–26)	March 18, 1912 – December 31, 1922 (Resigned)	10 years, 288 days	William Howard Taft
66	James Clark McReynolds (1862–1946)	TN	Associate; Justice	Lurton	August 29, 1914 (44–6)	October 12, 1914 – January 31, 1941 (Retired)	26 years, 111 days	Woodrow Wilson
67	Louis Brandeis (1856–1941)	MA	Associate; Justice	J. Lamar	June 1, 1916 (47–22)	June 5, 1916 – February 13, 1939 (Retired)	22 years, 253 days	Woodrow Wilson
68	John Hessin Clarke (1857–1945)	OH	Associate; Justice	Hughes	July 24, 1916 (Acclamation)	October 9, 1916 – September 18, 1922 (Retired)	5 years, 344 days	Woodrow Wilson
69	William Howard Taft (1857–1930)	CT	Chief; Justice	E. D. White	June 30, 1921 (Acclamation)	July 11, 1921 – February 3, 1930 (Retired)	8 years, 207 days	Warren G. Harding
70	George Sutherland (1862–1942)	UT	Associate; Justice	Clarke	September 5, 1922 (Acclamation)	October 2, 1922 – January 17, 1938 (Retired)	15 years, 107 days	Warren G. Harding
71	Pierce Butler (1866–1939)	MN	Associate; Justice	Day	December 21, 1922 (61–8)	January 2, 1923 – November 16, 1939 (Died)	16 years, 318 days	Warren G. Harding
72	Edward Terry Sanford (1865–1930)	TN	Associate; Justice	Pitney	January 29, 1923 (Acclamation)	February 19, 1923 – March 8, 1930 (Died)	7 years, 17 days	Warren G. Harding
73	Harlan F. Stone (1872–1946)	NY	Associate; Justice (Note: Acted as chief justice under 36 Stat. 1152, June 30 – July 3, 1941.)	McKenna	February 5, 1925 (71–6)	March 2, 1925 – July 2, 1941 (Continued as chief justice)	16 years, 122 days (Note: Harlan Stone's total duration on the Court was 21 years, 50 days.)	Calvin Coolidge
62	Charles Evans Hughes (1862–1948)	NY	Chief; Justice	Taft	February 13, 1930 (52–26)	February 24, 1930 – June 30, 1941 (Retired)	11 years, 126 days	Herbert Hoover
74	Owen Roberts (1875–1955)	PA	Associate; Justice	Sanford	May 20, 1930 (Acclamation)	June 2, 1930 – July 31, 1945 (Resigned)	15 years, 59 days	Herbert Hoover
75	Benjamin N. Cardozo (1870–1938)	NY	Associate; Justice	Holmes	February 24, 1932 (Acclamation)	March 14, 1932 – July 9, 1938 (Died)	6 years, 117 days	Herbert Hoover
76	Hugo Black (1886–1971)	AL	Associate; Justice (Note: Acted as chief justice under 36 Stat. 1152, April 22 – June 24, 1946, and again, under 62 Stat. 869, September 8 – October 5, 1953.)	Van Devanter	August 17, 1937 (63–16)	August 19, 1937 – September 17, 1971 (Retired)	34 years, 29 days	Franklin D. Roosevelt
77	Stanley Forman Reed (1884–1980)	KY	Associate; Justice	Sutherland	January 25, 1938 (Acclamation)	January 31, 1938 – February 25, 1957 (Retired)	19 years, 25 days	Franklin D. Roosevelt
78	Felix Frankfurter (1882–1965)	MA	Associate; Justice	Cardozo	January 17, 1939 (Acclamation)	January 30, 1939 – August 28, 1962 (Retired)	23 years, 210 days	Franklin D. Roosevelt
79	William O. Douglas (1898–1980)	CT	Associate; Justice	Brandeis	April 4, 1939 (62–4)	April 17, 1939 – November 12, 1975 (Retired)	36 years, 209 days	Franklin D. Roosevelt
80	Frank Murphy (1890–1949)	MI	Associate; Justice	Butler	January 16, 1940 (Acclamation)	February 5, 1940 – July 19, 1949 (Died)	9 years, 164 days	Franklin D. Roosevelt
73	Harlan F. Stone (1872–1946)	NY	Chief; Justice	Hughes	June 27, 1941 (Acclamation)	July 3, 1941 – April 22, 1946 (Died)	4 years, 293 days	Franklin D. Roosevelt
81	James F. Byrnes (1882–1972)	SC	Associate; Justice	McReynolds	June 12, 1941 (Acclamation)	July 8, 1941 – October 3, 1942 (Resigned)	1 year, 87 days	Franklin D. Roosevelt
82	Robert H. Jackson (1892–1954)	NY	Associate; Justice	Stone	July 7, 1941 (Acclamation)	July 11, 1941 – October 9, 1954 (Died)	13 years, 90 days	Franklin D. Roosevelt
83	Wiley Rutledge (1894–1949)	IA	Associate; Justice	Byrnes	February 8, 1943 (Acclamation)	February 15, 1943 – September 10, 1949 (Died)	6 years, 207 days	Franklin D. Roosevelt
84	Harold H. Burton (1888–1964)	OH	Associate; Justice	O. Roberts	September 19, 1945 (Acclamation)	October 1, 1945 – October 13, 1958 (Retired)	13 years, 12 days	Harry S. Truman
85	Fred M. Vinson (1890–1953)	KY	Chief; Justice	Stone	June 20, 1946 (Acclamation)	June 24, 1946 – September 8, 1953 (Died)	7 years, 76 days	Harry S. Truman
86	Tom C. Clark (1899–1977)	TX	Associate; Justice	Murphy	August 18, 1949 (73–8)	August 24, 1949 – June 12, 1967 (Retired)	17 years, 292 days	Harry S. Truman
87	Sherman Minton (1890–1965)	IN	Associate; Justice	W. Rutledge	October 4, 1949 (48–16)	October 12, 1949 – October 15, 1956 (Retired)	7 years, 3 days	Harry S. Truman
88	Earl Warren (1891–1974)	CA	Chief; Justice	Vinson	March 1, 1954 (Acclamation)	October 5, 1953 – June 23, 1969 (Retired)	15 years, 261 days	Dwight D. Eisenhower
89	John Marshall Harlan II (1899–1971)	NY	Associate; Justice	R. Jackson	March 16, 1955 (71–11)	March 28, 1955 – September 23, 1971 (Retired)	16 years, 179 days	Dwight D. Eisenhower
90	William J. Brennan Jr. (1906–1997)	NJ	Associate; Justice	Minton	March 19, 1957 (Acclamation)	October 16, 1956 – July 20, 1990 (Retired)	33 years, 277 days	Dwight D. Eisenhower
91	Charles Evans Whittaker (1901–1973)	MO	Associate; Justice	Reed	March 19, 1957 (Acclamation)	March 25, 1957 – March 31, 1962 (Retired)	5 years, 6 days	Dwight D. Eisenhower
92	Potter Stewart (1915–1985)	OH	Associate; Justice	Burton	May 5, 1959 (70–17)	October 14, 1958 – July 3, 1981 (Retired)	22 years, 262 days	Dwight D. Eisenhower
93	Byron White (1917–2002)	CO	Associate; Justice	Whittaker	April 11, 1962 (Acclamation)	April 16, 1962 – June 28, 1993 (Retired)	31 years, 73 days	John F. Kennedy
94	Arthur Goldberg (1908–1990)	IL	Associate; Justice	Frankfurter	September 25, 1962 (Acclamation)	October 1, 1962 – July 25, 1965 (Resigned)	2 years, 297 days	John F. Kennedy
95	Abe Fortas (1910–1982)	TN	Associate; Justice	Goldberg	August 11, 1965 (Acclamation)	October 4, 1965 – May 14, 1969 (Resigned)	3 years, 222 days	Lyndon B. Johnson
96	Thurgood Marshall (1908–1993)	NY	Associate; Justice	Clark	August 30, 1967 (69–11)	October 2, 1967 – October 1, 1991 (Retired)	23 years, 364 days	Lyndon B. Johnson
97	Warren E. Burger (1907–1995)	VA	Chief; Justice	Warren	June 9, 1969 (74–3)	June 23, 1969 – September 26, 1986 (Retired)	17 years, 95 days	Richard Nixon
98	Harry Blackmun (1908–1999)	MN	Associate; Justice	Fortas	May 12, 1970 (94–0)	June 9, 1970 – August 3, 1994 (Retired)	24 years, 55 days	Richard Nixon
99	Lewis F. Powell Jr. (1907–1998)	VA	Associate; Justice	Black	December 6, 1971 (89–1)	January 7, 1972 (Note: Although Lewis Powell and William H. Rehnquist were both sworn into office as associate justice on the same day, Powell by law took precedence as the more senior associate justice, his judicial commission bearing the date Dec. 9, 1971; Rehnquist's commission bore the date of Dec. 16, 1971.) – June 26, 1987 (Retired)	15 years, 170 days	Richard Nixon
100	William Rehnquist (1924–2005)	AZ	Associate; Justice	J. Harlan II	December 10, 1971 (68–26)	January 7, 1972 – September 26, 1986 (Continued as chief justice)	14 years, 262 days (Note: William Rehnquist's total duration on the Court was 33 years, 239 days.)	Richard Nixon
101	John Paul Stevens (1920–2019)	IL	Associate; Justice (Note: Acted as chief justice under 62 Stat. 869, September 3–29, 2005.)	Douglas	December 17, 1975 (98–0)	December 19, 1975 – June 29, 2010 (Retired)	34 years, 192 days	Gerald Ford
102	Sandra Day O'Connor (1930–2023)	AZ	Associate; Justice	Stewart	September 21, 1981 (99–0)	September 25, 1981 – January 31, 2006 (Retired)	24 years, 128 days	Ronald Reagan
100	William Rehnquist (1924–2005)	VA	Chief; Justice	Burger	September 17, 1986 (65–33)	September 26, 1986 – September 3, 2005 (Died)	18 years, 342 days	Ronald Reagan
103	Antonin Scalia (1936–2016)	VA	Associate; Justice	Rehnquist	September 17, 1986 (98–0)	September 26, 1986 – February 13, 2016 (Died)	29 years, 140 days	Ronald Reagan
104	Anthony Kennedy (born 1936)	CA	Associate; Justice	Powell	February 3, 1988 (97–0)	February 18, 1988 – July 31, 2018 (Retired)	30 years, 163 days	Ronald Reagan
105	David Souter (1939–2025)	NH	Associate; Justice	Brennan	October 2, 1990 (90–9)	October 9, 1990 – June 29, 2009 (Retired)	18 years, 263 days	George H. W. Bush
106	Clarence Thomas (born 1948)	GA	Associate; Justice	T. Marshall	October 15, 1991 (52–48)	October 23, 1991 – present	35 years, 5 days	George H. W. Bush
107	Ruth Bader Ginsburg (1933–2020)	NY	Associate; Justice	B. White	August 3, 1993 (96–3)	August 10, 1993 – September 18, 2020 (Died)	27 years, 39 days	Bill Clinton
108	Stephen Breyer (born 1938)	MA	Associate; Justice	Blackmun	July 29, 1994 (87–9)	August 3, 1994 – June 30, 2022 (Retired)	27 years, 331 days	Bill Clinton
109	John Roberts (born 1955)	MD	Chief; Justice	Rehnquist	September 29, 2005 (78–22)	September 29, 2005 – present	21 years, 29 days	George W. Bush
110	Samuel Alito (born 1950)	NJ	Associate; Justice	O'Connor	January 31, 2006 (58–42)	January 31, 2006 – present	20 years, 270 days	George W. Bush
111	Sonia Sotomayor (born 1954)	NY	Associate; Justice	Souter	August 6, 2009 (68–31)	August 8, 2009 – present	17 years, 81 days	Barack Obama
112	Elena Kagan (born 1960)	MA	Associate; Justice	Stevens	August 5, 2010 (63–37)	August 7, 2010 – present	16 years, 82 days	Barack Obama
113	Neil Gorsuch (born 1967)	CO	Associate; Justice	Scalia	April 7, 2017 (54–45)	April 10, 2017 – present	9 years, 201 days	Donald Trump
114	Brett Kavanaugh (born 1965)	MD	Associate; Justice	Kennedy	October 6, 2018 (50–48)	October 6, 2018 – present	8 years, 22 days	Donald Trump
115	Amy Coney Barrett (born 1972)	IN	Associate; Justice	Ginsburg	October 26, 2020 (52–48)	October 27, 2020 – present	6 years, 1 day	Donald Trump
116	Ketanji Brown Jackson (born 1970)	DC	Associate; Justice	Breyer	April 7, 2022 (53–47)	June 30, 2022 – present	4 years, 120 days	Joe Biden

== Timeline of justices ==
This graphical timeline depicts the progression of the justices on the U.S. Supreme Court. Information regarding each justice's predecessors, successors, and fellow justices, as well as their tenure on the court, can be gleaned (and comparisons between justices drawn) from it. There are no formal names or numbers for the individual seats of the associate justices, which are listed in the table below simply by number. Additionally, the progression of U.S. presidents is shown at the top of the timeline to give a more detailed historical context.

== See also ==
- Law of the United States
- List of courts of the United States
- List of supreme courts by country
