= Court of cassation =

Type of judicial institution

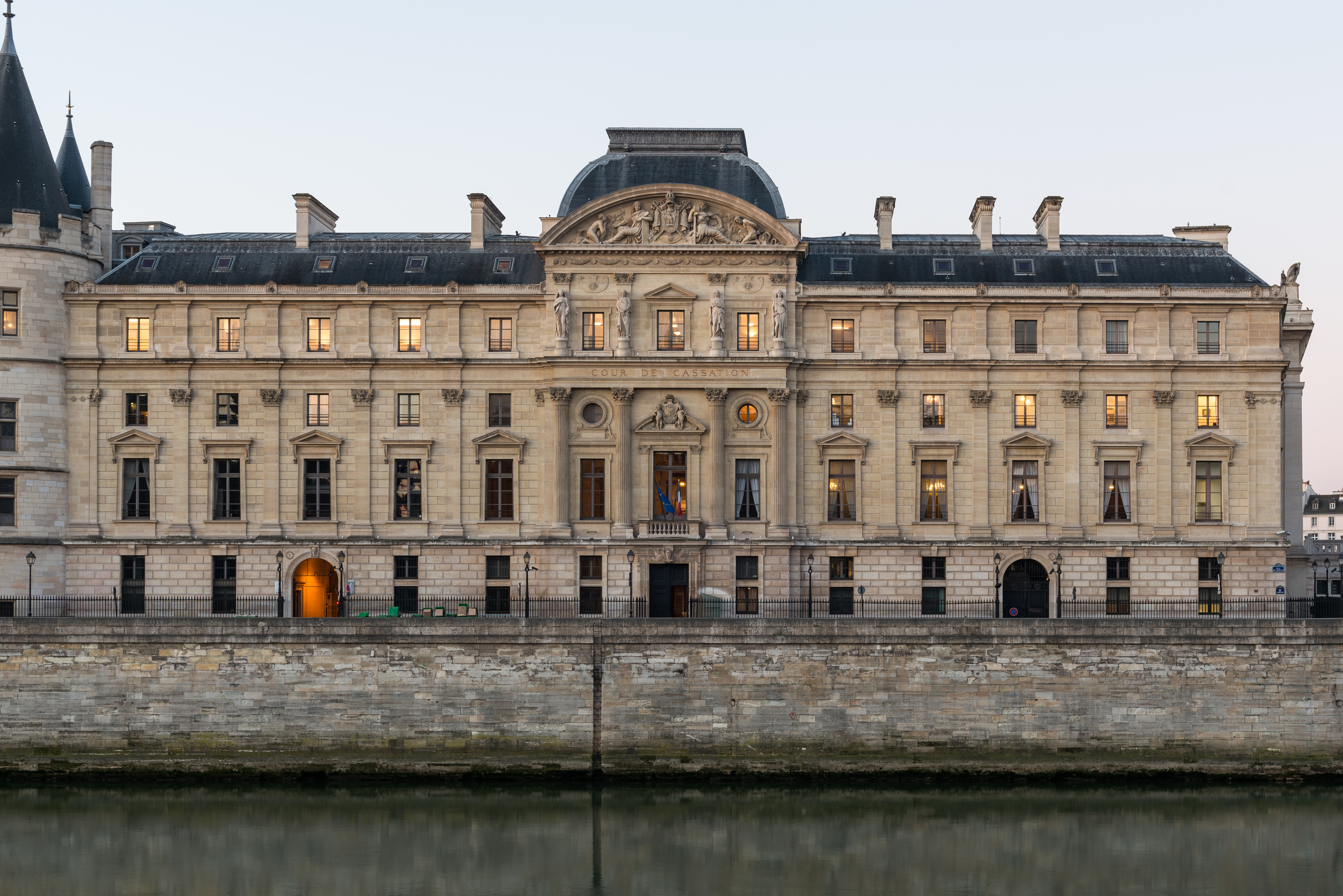
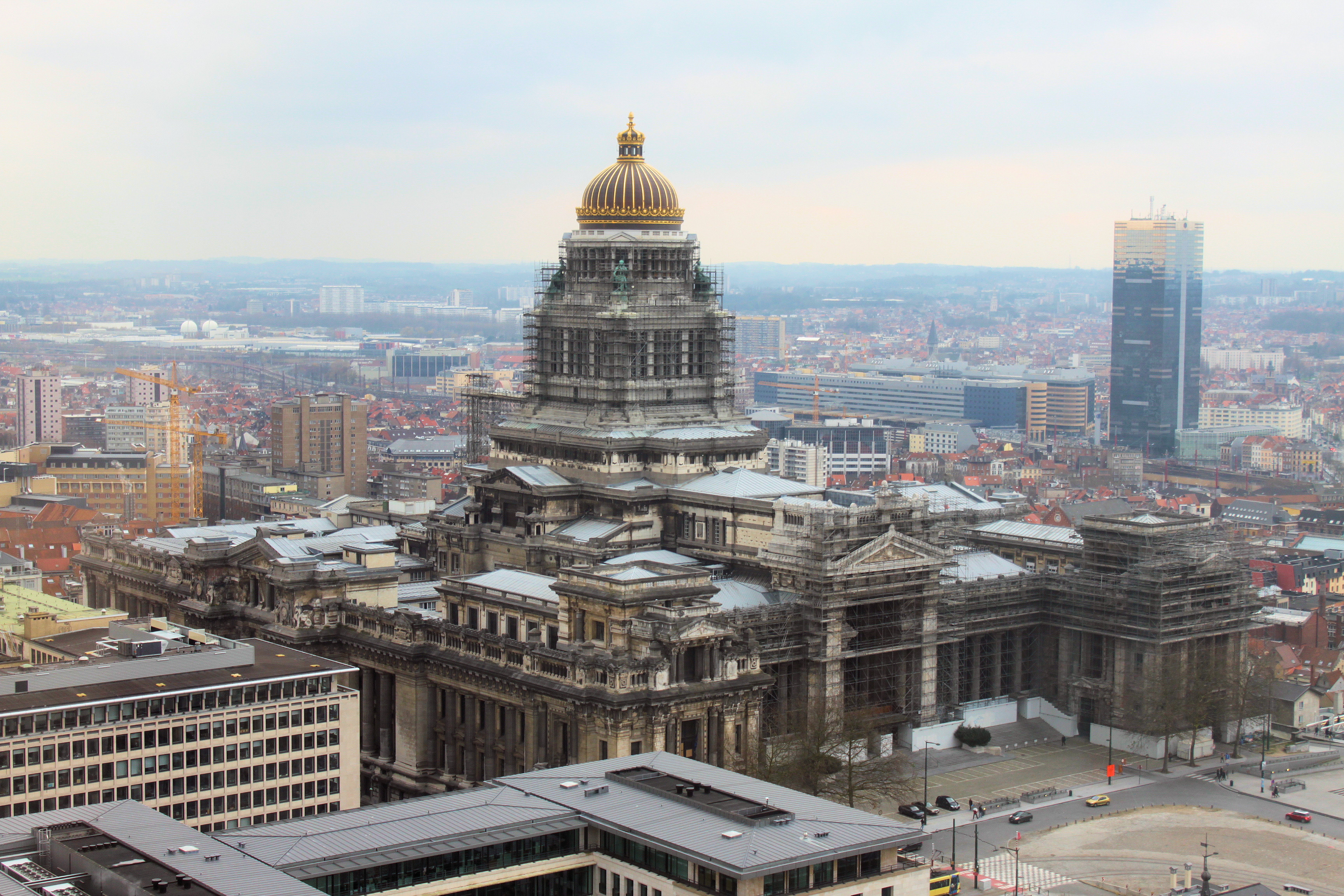
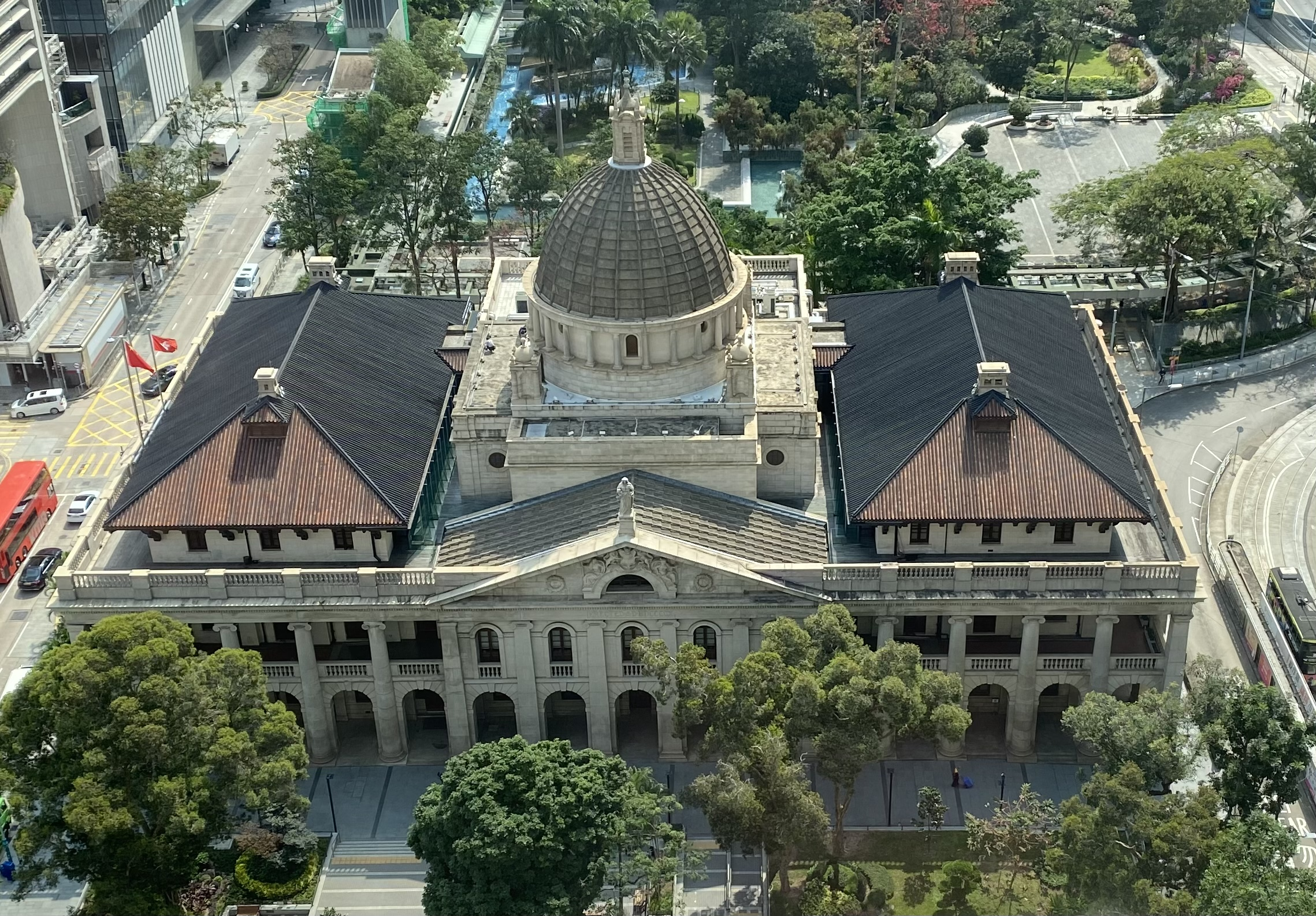
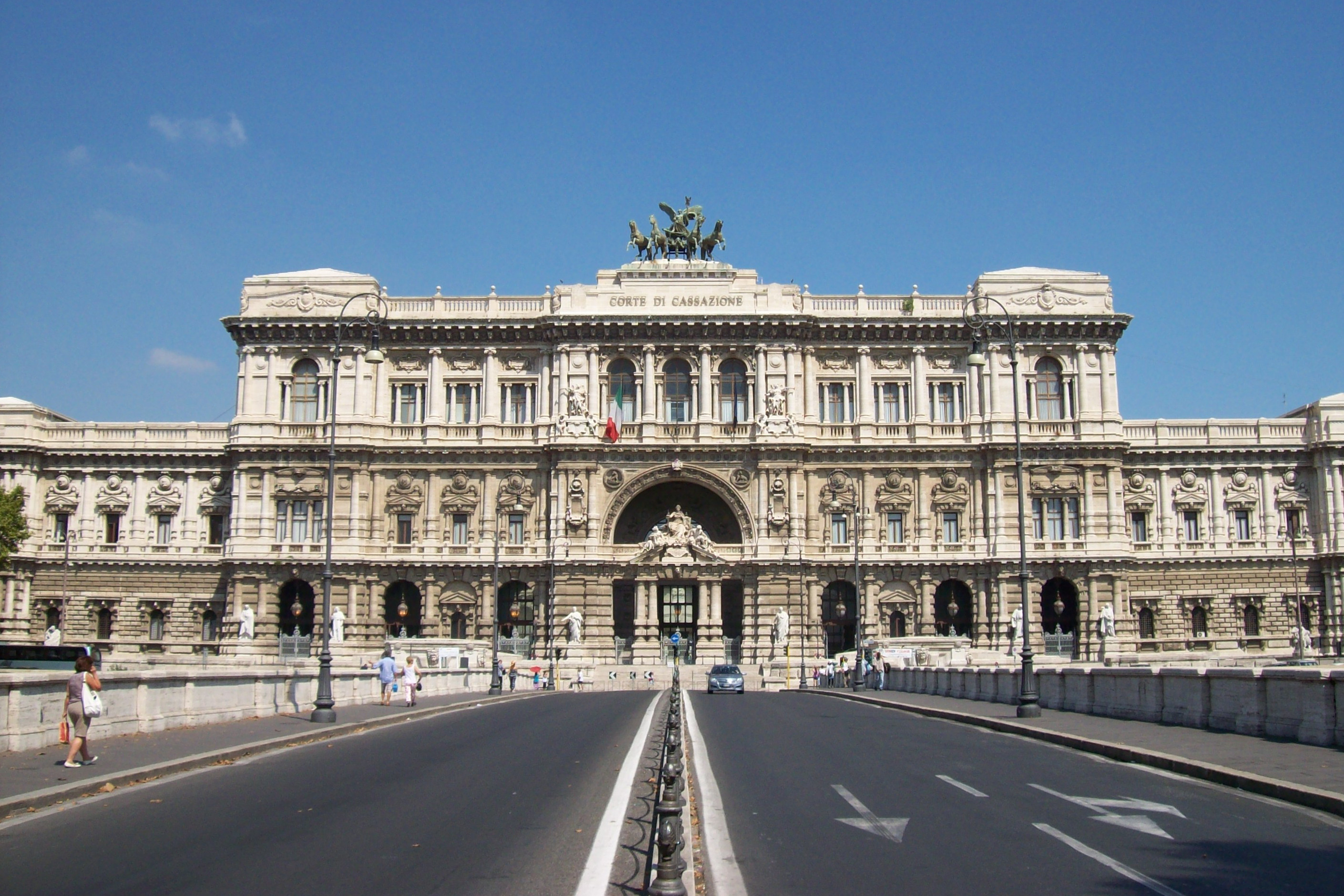
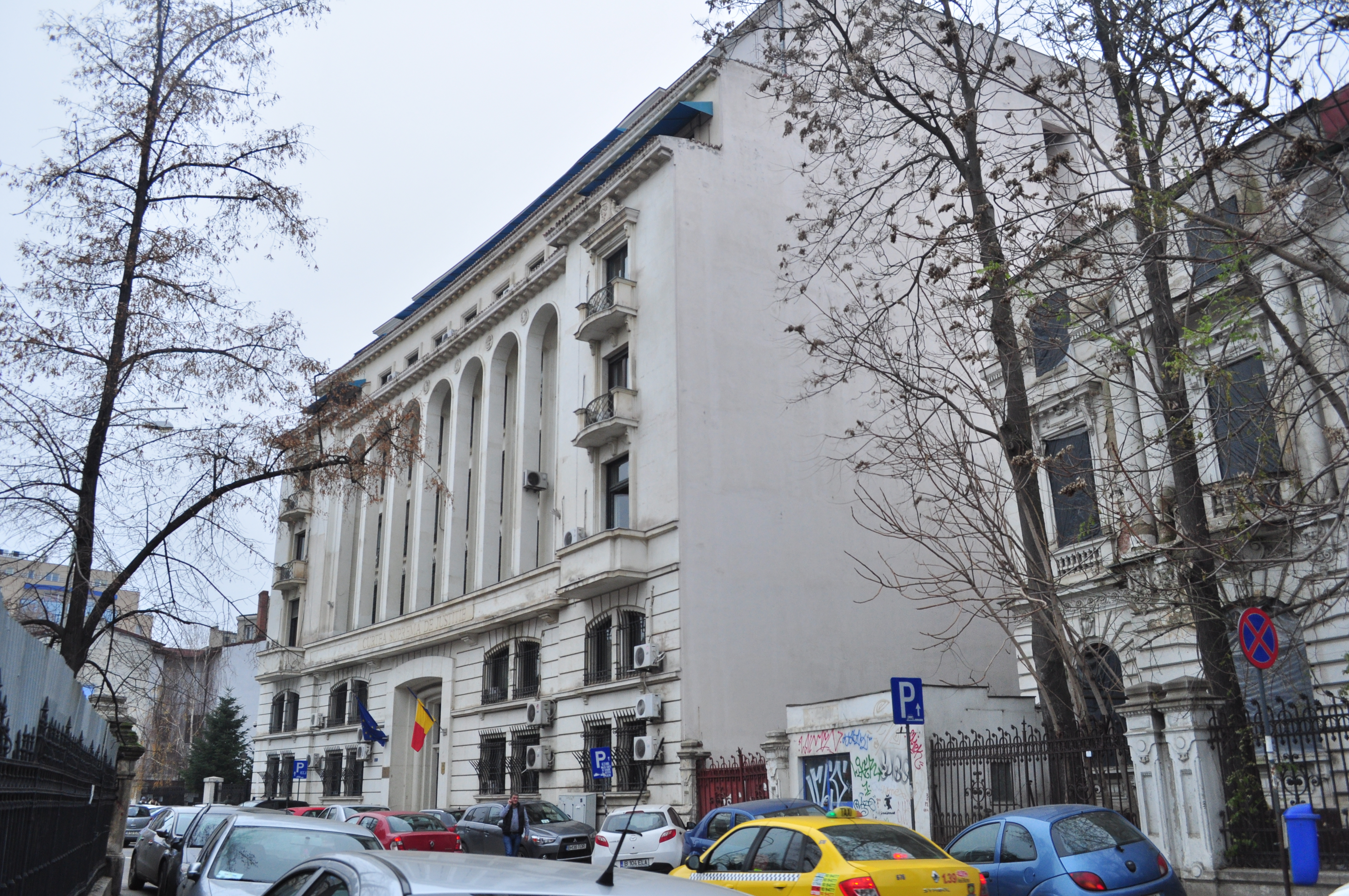
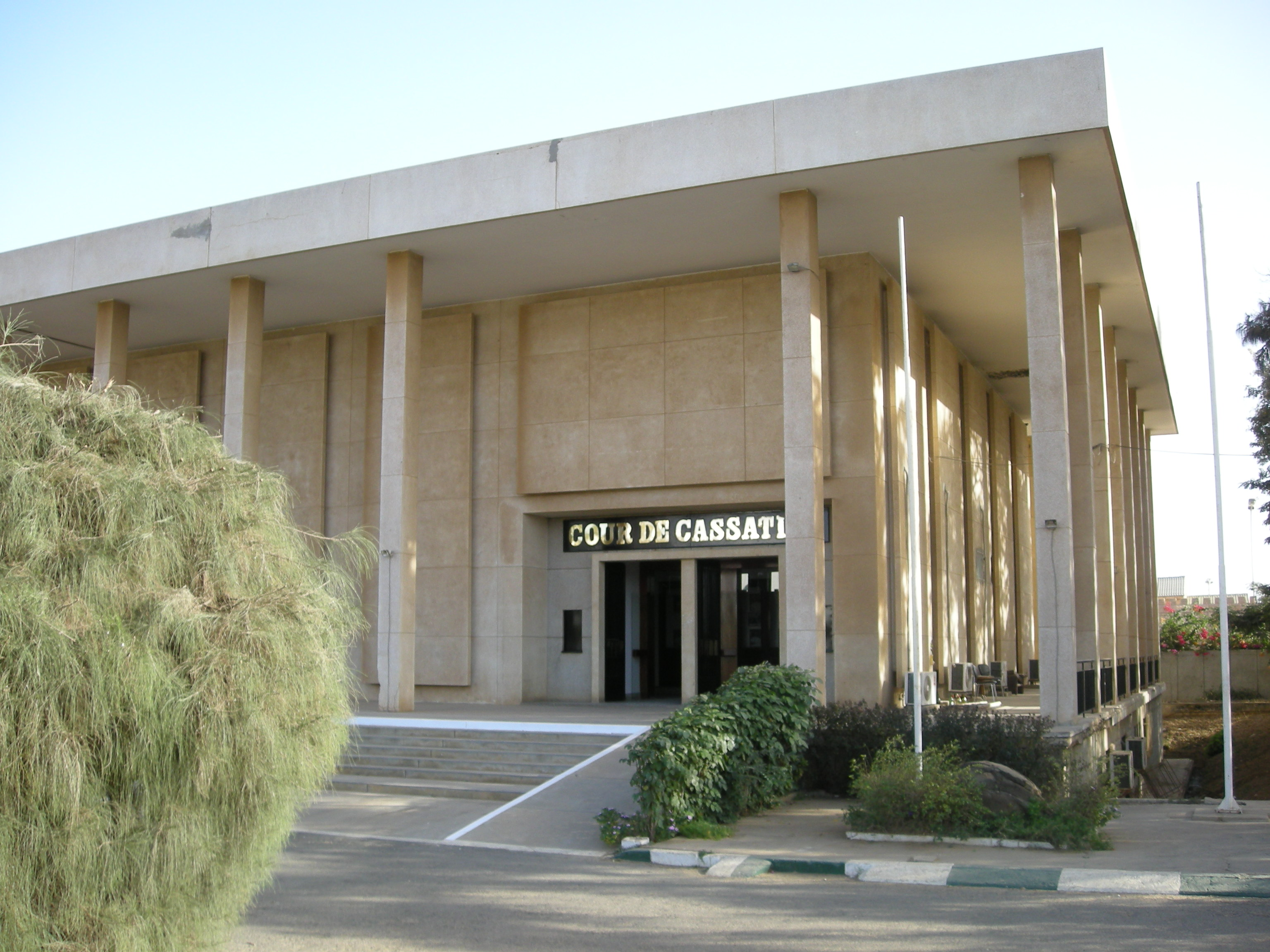
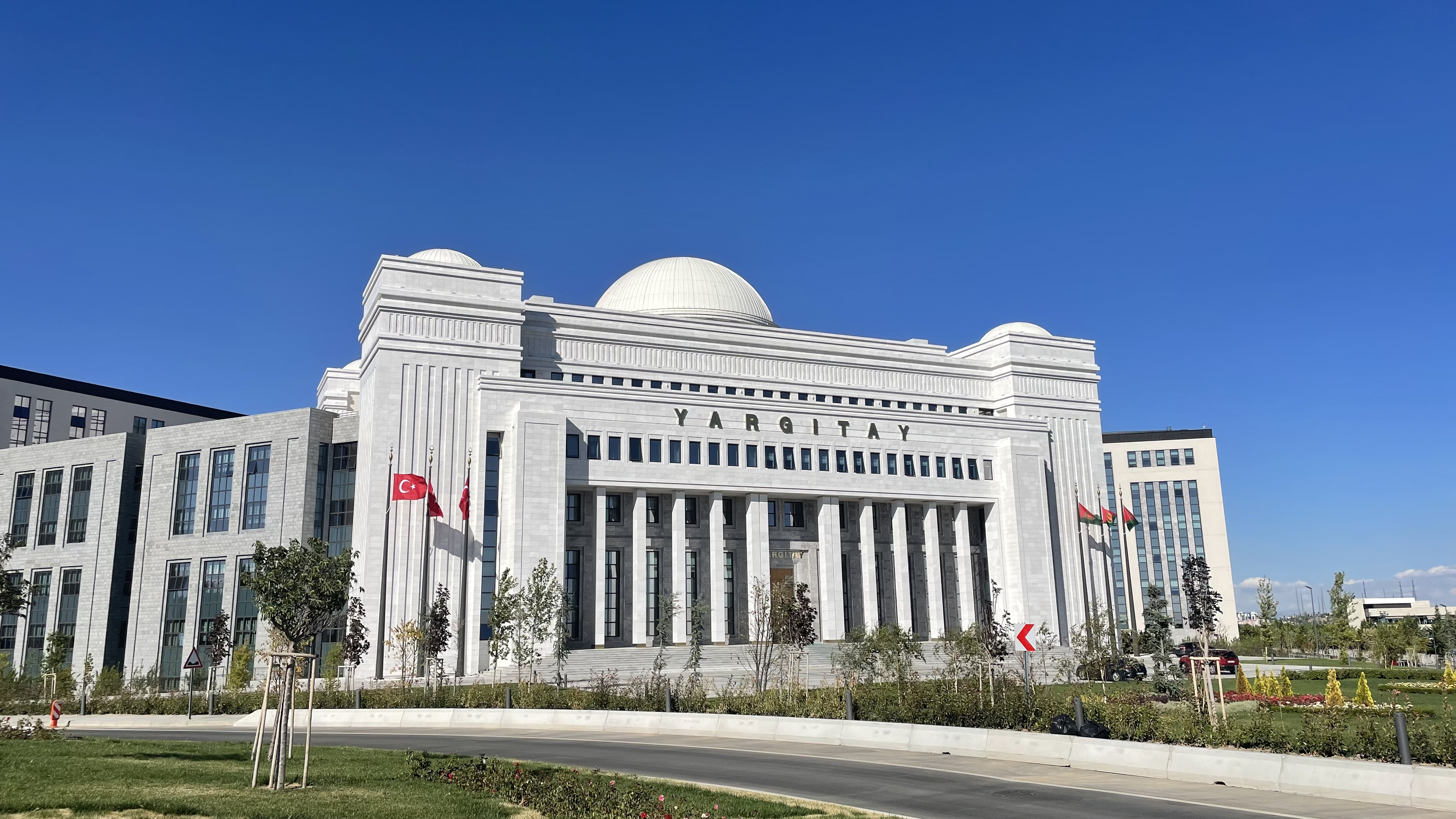
Seats of courts of cassation:
- French Court of Cassation
- Belgian Court of Cassation

- Haitian Court of Cassation
- Hong Kong Court of Final Appeal

- Italian Supreme Court of Cassation
- Romanian High Court of Cassation and Justice

- Senegalese Court of Cassation
- Turkish Court of Cassation

A court of cassation is a high-instance court that exists in some judicial systems. Courts of cassation do not re-examine the facts of a case; they only interpret the relevant law. In this, they are appellate courts of the highest instance. In this way, they differ from systems that have a supreme court that can rule on both the facts of a case and the relevant law. The term derives from the Latin cassare, "to reverse or overturn".

The European Court of Justice (ECJ) answers questions of European Union law following a referral from a court of a member state. In exercising this function it is not a court of cassation: it issues binding advice to the national courts on how EU law ought to be interpreted, it does not overturn decisions of those courts. However, the ECJ can act as a court of cassation when it hears appeals in particular cases from decisions of the General Court of the European Union.

Many common-law supreme courts, like the United States Supreme Court, use a similar system, whereby the court vacates the decision of the lower court and remands the case for retrial in a lower court consistent with the decision of the court hearing the appeal. Where the system differs is that in legal systems such as the American federal courts, mid-tier appeals courts (courts of appeals) generally also remand cases to first-instance courts. In contrast, in France, for example, courts of appeal hear cases on the facts and the law also, and only in the higher court of cassation is examination confined to matters of law. In this sense, a petition for a writ of certiorari is akin to a pourvoi en cassation.

== Particular courts of cassation by country or jurisdiction ==
Cassation courts are listed below.

- Supreme Court of Albania
- Court of Cassation of Austria
- Court of Cassation (Armenia)
- Supreme Court of the Republic of Azerbaijan
- Court of Cassation (Belgium)
- Superior Court of Justice (Brazil)
- Supreme Court of Cassation of Bulgaria
- Court of Cassation (Catalonia), defunct
- Court of Cassation (Democratic Republic of the Congo)
- Supreme Court of the Czech Republic
  - Supreme Administrative Court of the Czech Republic
- Corte Nacional de Justicia (Ecuador)
- Court of Cassation (Egypt)
- Supreme Court of Estonia
- Court of Cassation (France)
- Supreme Court of Georgia
- Court of Cassation (Greece)
- In Germany:
  - the Federal Court of Justice,
  - the Federal Administrative Court,
  - the Federal Labour Court,
  - the Federal Social Court,
  - and the Federal Fiscal Court
- Court of Cassation (Haiti)
- Court of Final Appeal (Hong Kong)
- Supreme Court of Indonesia (Indonesia)
- Court of Cassation (Iraq)
- Supreme Court of Cassation (Italy)
- Supreme Court of Japan
- Court of Cassation (Jordan)
- Supreme Court of Korea (South Korea)
- Court of Cassation (Kuwait)
- Court of Cassation (Lebanon)
- Supreme Court of Lithuania
- Court of Cassation (Luxembourg)
- Court of Cassation (Morocco)
- Supreme Court of the Netherlands
- Supreme Court of Poland
- Court of Cassation (Qatar)
- High Court of Cassation and Justice (Romania)
- Supreme Court of Russia
- Court of Cassation (Senegal)
- Supreme Court of Cassation of Serbia
- Supreme Court of the Slovak Republic
- Supreme Court of Spain
- Court of Cassation (Sudan)
- Supreme Court of the Republic of China (Taiwan)
- Court of Cassation (Tunisia)
- Court of Cassation (Turkey)
- Supreme Specialized Court of Ukraine for Civil and Criminal Cases (Ukraine)
- Court of Cassation (Vatican City)

== See also ==
- Vacation and remand, similar doctrines in common-law countries, such as the United States.
