= Fernana =

Coordinates: 36°39′N 8°42′E

- Commune and town
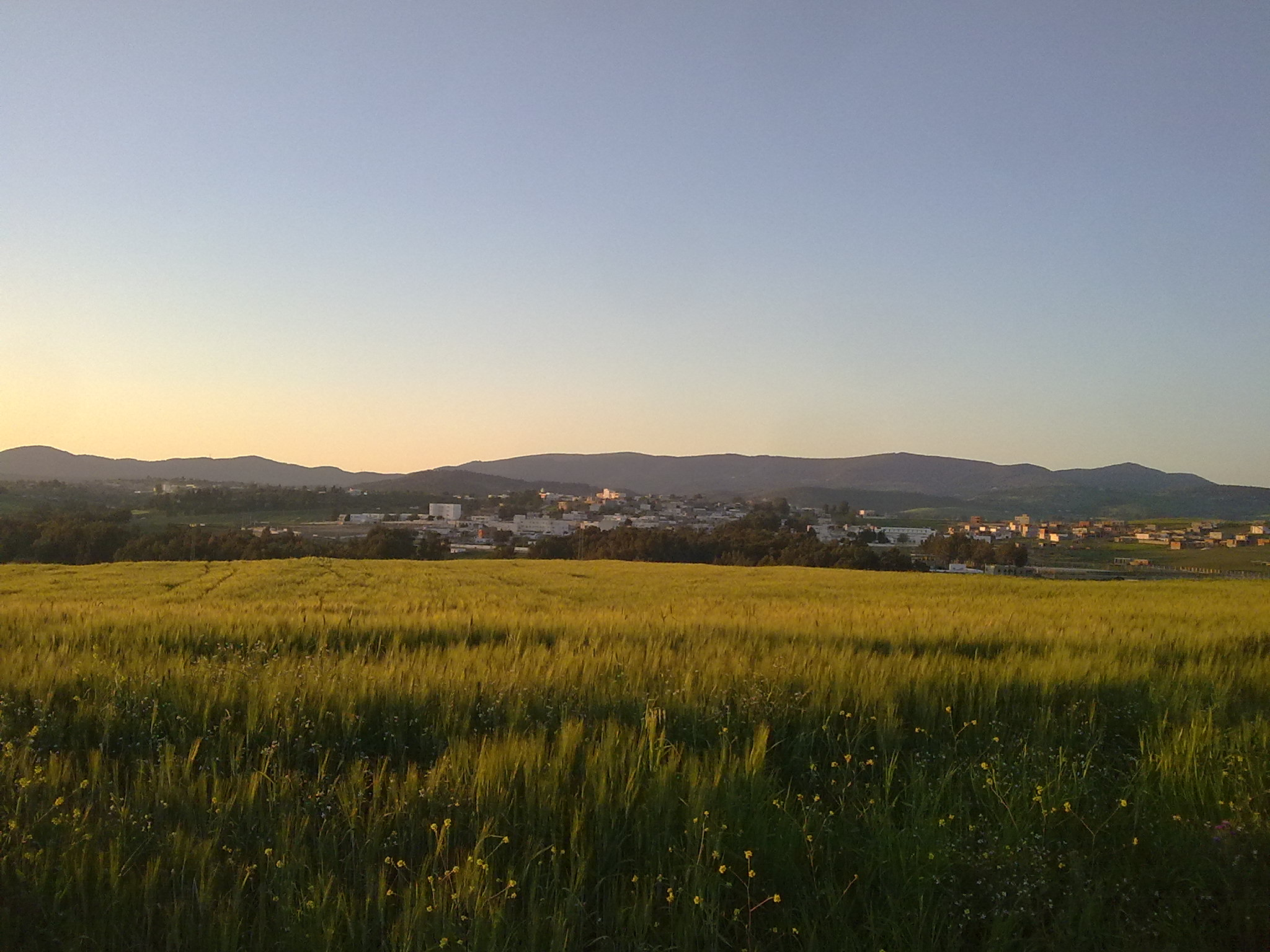
- Interactive map of Fernana
- Country: Tunisia
- Governorate: Jendouba Governorate

Population (2014)
  - Total: 4,681
- Time zone: UTC+1 (CET)

Fernana is a town and commune in the Jendouba Governorate about 170 km from Tunis, Tunisia. In 2006 the municipal center of the commune had a population of 3,206. It is now estimated to more than 5,000 inhabitants. The whole commune has about 50,000 inhabitants (52,690 in 2006). Most inhabitants work in agriculture, particularly in tobacco farming.

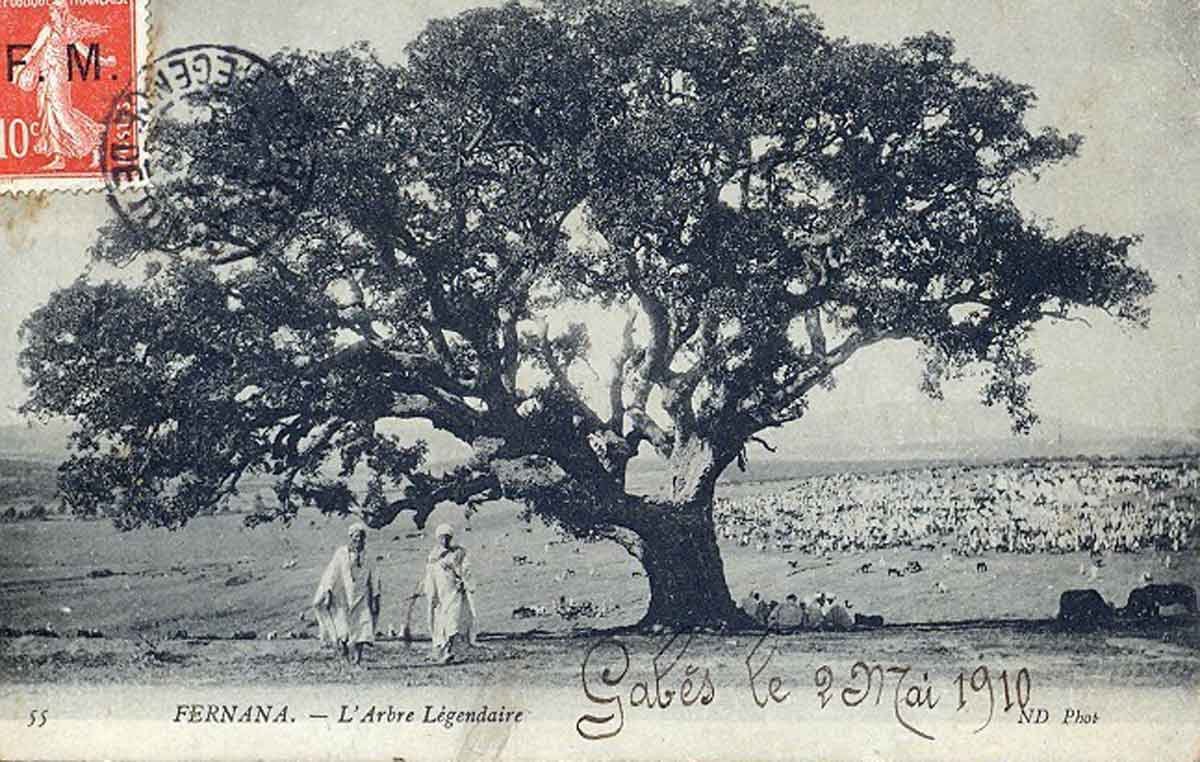
Arbre à palabres

== Notable people ==
- Noureddine Ghazouani (born 1946), lawyer and university lecturer

== See also ==
- List of cities in Tunisia
