= Supreme Court of Guinea-Bissau =

The Supreme Court of Guinea-Bissau is Guinea-Bissau's Supreme court. It exercises original jurisdiction over serious matters in Guinea-Bissau of which a lower court (or, a magistrate's court) does not have the proper authority to operate and/or act on. The Supreme Court also serves as the Constitutional Court. After the coup d'état on 26 November 2025, the High Military Command for the Restoration of National Security and Public Order published a transitional charter on 10 December 2025, where the military junta announced to establish a constitutional court, one proposal of the constitutional referendum on 30 August 2026 was the establishment of a Constitutional court.
