= Jean Pradel =

French jurist (1933–2021)

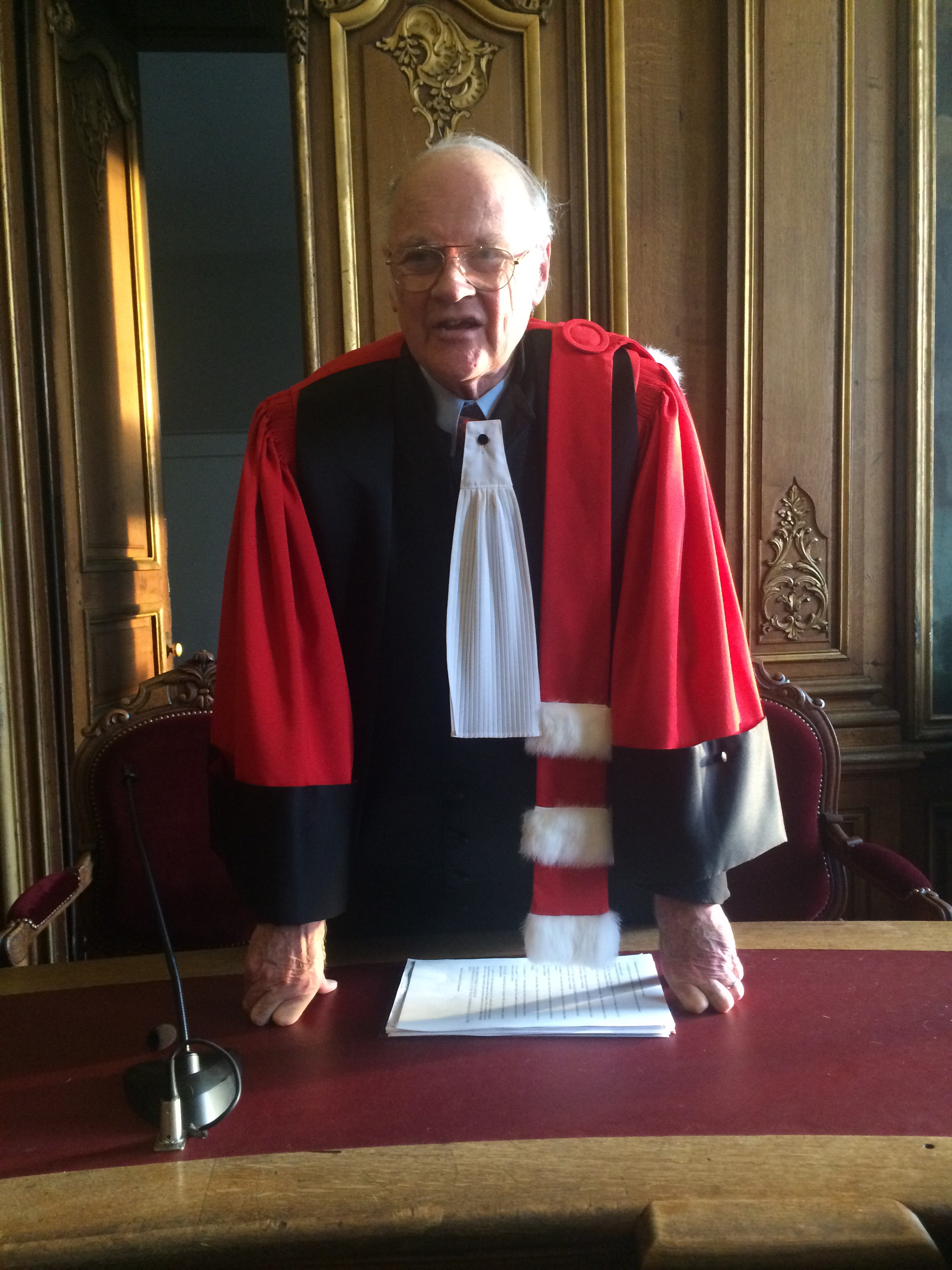
- Pradel in 2015
- Born: 29 October 1933; Châtellerault, France
- Died: 12 July 2021 (aged 87)
- Occupations: Jurist; Professor

Jean Pradel (29 October 1933 – 12 July 2021) was a French jurist, magistrate, and professor. He specialised in criminal law.

== Biography ==
Pradel studied at the Faculty of Law at the University of Poitiers from 1951 to 1957 and subsequently passed the entrance exam for the French National School for the Judiciary. He briefly served as a deputy judge at the Tribunal de grande instance of Brest before serving in the Algerian War from 1958 to 1960. In 1962, he became a Deputy Procureur de la République and a military prosecutor in Nemours.

In 1970, Pradel became an associate lecturer at the Faculty of Law of Tunis University before returning to his alma mater, the Faculty of Law of Poitiers, in 1972 as a professor. He retired in 2003. While at Poitiers, he directed the institute of judicial studies and the institute of criminal sciences. He served on the Conseil national des universités from 1984 to 1997. In 2000, he became a professor of criminal studies at the Institut catholique d'études supérieures in La Roche-sur-Yon.

Jean Pradel died on 12 July 2021 at the age of 87.
