= Judiciary of Northern Cyprus =

The Judiciary of Northern Cyprus is the system of courts which interprets and applies the law in Northern Cyprus. Judicial independence is safeguarded by the Constitution of the country.

Regulations applied in Northern Cyprus' courts are specified in Courts Law's 38th article. According to this article, the applied regulations are those: (a) Constitution of Northern Cyprus (b) regulations in force (as far as they do not violate the Constitution) (c) common law, i.e., judge-made law (as far as they do not violate the Constitution) (d) Evkaf Rules (e) regulations on Sea Law that was in execution on 21 December 1963.

== Supreme Court ==
The Supreme Court is the highest court in Northern Cyprus.

== District courts ==
There are 5 district courts: 1. Lefkoşa (Nicosia) district court 2. Gazimağusa (Famagusta) district court 3. Girne (Kyrenia) district court 4. Güzelyurt (Morphou) district court 5. İskele (Trikomo) district court.

== Immovable Property Commission ==
The Immovable Property Commission was set up under the Immovable Property Law (No. 67/2005) in accordance with the rulings of the European Court of Human Rights in the case of Xenides-Arestis v. Turkey. The purpose of this measure was to establish an effective domestic remedy for claims relating to abandoned properties in Northern Cyprus.

== Relevant European Court of Human Rights decisions ==
The European Court of Human Rights (ECtHR) has made decisions on the validity of the legal system of Northern Cyprus.

=== Legality of domestic Turkish Republic of Northern Cyprus (TRNC) legislation ===
On 2 July 2013, ECtHR decided that "...notwithstanding the lack of international recognition of the regime in the northern area, a de facto recognition of its acts may be rendered necessary for practical purposes. Thus, the adoption by the authorities of the "TRNC" of civil, administrative or criminal law measures, and their application or enforcement within that territory, may be regarded as having a legal basis in domestic law for the purposes of the Convention." This statement related to affirming TRNC legislation on trespassing and conservation of historic sites and dismissed the complaint, on the basis that this legislation sufficed to make interrupting a religious service held without a permit on a historic site, permissible under the Convention.

=== The legality, independence, and impartiality of the TRNC's courts ===
On 2 September 2015, the European Court of Human Rights (ECtHR) decided that "...the court system in the "TRNC", including both civil and criminal courts, reflected the judicial and common-law tradition of Cyprus in its functioning and procedures, and that the "TRNC" courts were thus to be considered as "established by law" with reference to the "constitutional and legal basis" on which they operated......the Court has already found that the court system set up in the "TRNC" was to be considered to have been "established by law" with reference to the "constitutional and legal basis" on which it operated, and it has not accepted the allegation that the "TRNC" courts as a whole lacked independence and/or impartiality......when an act of the "TRNC" authorities was in compliance with laws in force within the territory of northern Cyprus, those acts should in principle be regarded as having a legal basis in domestic law for the purposes of the convention.." "Laws in force within the territory of northern Cyprus" refers to laws promulgated and implemented by the TRNC (See ECtHR's above 02.07.2013 decision).

=== Differences in the legal systems of the TRNC and Transnistria, Abkhazia, and Crimea ===
On 25 June 2024, the European Court of Human Rights (ECtHR) [Ukraine v. Russia Case (Crimea); Applications 20958/14 and 38334/18] explained the reasons for the legality of the actions of TRNC laws in the north of Cyprus under the ECtHR framework and in particular, why the situation of the TRNC differs from that of Crimea, Transnistria, and Abkhazia:

930. Whereas the Court held that "TRNC Domestic Law" was based on the Anglo-Saxon legal tradition and was therefore accepted as "law" for the purposes of the Convention, in cases concerning Transdniestria (the "MRT"), the Court found "no basis for assuming that [in the 'MRT'] there is a system reflecting a judicial tradition compatible with the Convention similar to the one in the remainder of the Republic of Moldova". The Court has reached similar conclusions regarding the "law" of Abkhazia and the "lawfulness" of Abkhaz courts.

932....Moreover, while the "MRT" and Abkhaz-related cases concerned the "law" of unrecognised entities that did not reflect "a judicial tradition ... similar to the one in the remainder of the Republic of Moldova" or "to the rest of Georgia" respectively, in Cyprus v. Turkey (merits) the Court held that "the civil courts operating in the 'TRNC' were in substance based on the Anglo-Saxon tradition and were not essentially different from the courts operating before the events of 1974 and from those which existed in the southern part of Cyprus".

The court emphasized that this continuity creates a difference in the case of Ukraine v. Russia and Cyprus v. Turkey.

"The Cyprus v. Turkey case concerned the continued application of pre-existing Cypriot law valid in the territory of the "TRNC" before Turkey had obtained actual control of that territory, whereas [Ukraine v. Russia] concerns the application in Crimea of the law of the Russian Federation (or the "law" of the local authorities, as its derivative) replacing the previously applicable and valid Ukrainian law."
