= Supreme Administrative Court of Slovakia =

Supreme Administrative Court of the Slovak Republic
- Najvyšší Správny Súd Slovenskej republiky
- Established: 1 January 2021
- Location: Bratislava, Slovak Republic
- Composition method: Presidential appointment after nomination of the Judicial Council of the Slovak Republic
- Authorised by: Constitution of the Slovak Republic
- Judge term length: life (maximum of 67 years of age )
- Number of positions: 30 (currently 25)
- Website: https://www.nssud.sk/

President
- Currently: vacant
- Since: vacant

The Supreme Administrative Court of the Slovak Republic is the highest juridical authority and the last court of appeals in Slovakia on matters of administrative law. It also has original jurisdiction on matters of banning of political parties, disciplinary trials of judges, prosecutors, notaries and court executors, deciding the constitutionality and legality of an disputed election of local sel-governance bodies (regions, towns and municipalities ) and cases between public institutions over matters of jurisdiction.

== History ==
In the past, administrative cases in Slovakia were decided by Regional Courts as first-instance courts, and the Supreme Court as the appellate court. This changed with a modification of the constitution in 2020, creating the Supreme Administrative Court in 2021. The National Council also created by a law passed in 2022 (effective since 2023), three Administrative Courts in Bratislava, Bánska Bystrica and Košice, to serve as first-instance courts in matters of administrative law.

== Judges ==
The full number of judges should be 30, but currently the court only has 25. Since 19 May 2026, the position of chief judge has been vacant. Current judges are:

Judges of the Supreme Administrative Court of Slovak Republic
Judge	On the Court since	appointed as a judge	before his service on supreme administrative court	Note
Pavol Naď	18.5. 2021	31.3. 2006 (appointed by President Ivan Gašparovič)	judge of Regional court of Košice	Chief Judge 18.5 2021–18.5.2026 (appointed by President Zuzana Čaputová);</ref> Chair of a pannel since 10.12.2021
Kristína Babiaková	20.7. 2021	20.7. 2021 (appointed by President Zuzana Čaputová)	attorney	Chair of a pannel since 15.12.2022
Marián Fečík	20.7.2021	20.7.2021 (appointed by President Zuzana Čaputová)	Prosecutor	Chair of a pannel since 1.6.2022
Zuzana Šabová	20.7. 2021	20.7. 2021 (appointed by President Zuzana Čaputová)	government employee	Chair of a pannel since 21.6. 2024
Juraj Vačok	20.7. 2021	20. 7. 2021; (appointed by President Zuzana Čaputová)	University professor	Chair of a pannel since 15.12.2022
Juraj Vališ	20. 7. 2021	20.7.2021 (appointed by President Zuzana Čaputová)	attorney	Chair of a pannel since 15.12.2022
Elena Berthotyová	1. August 2021	27. April 1994; 18. máj 1998 (elected by National Council)	judge of the Supreme Court	chair of a pannel since 13.3. 2015(then on the Supreme Court)
Katarína Benczová	1. August 2021	20. March 1996; 14. March 2000 (elected by National Council)	Judge of the Supreme Court	chair of a pannel since 1. 1.2019(then on the Supreme Court)
Anita Filová	1. August 2021	4. December 2017; (appointed by President Andrej Kiska)	Judge of the Region Court of Trnava	chair of a pannel since 10.12. 2021
Jana Hatalová	1. August 2021	24. August 1992; (appointed by Presidium of the Slovak National Council)	Judge of the Supreme Court	chair of a pannel since 1. 1.2008(then on the Supreme Court)
Petra Príbelská	1. August 2021	29. oktober 2004; (appointed by President Ivan Gašparovič)	Judge of the Supreme Court	chair of a pannel since 15.5. 2017(then on the Supreme Court)
Viola Takáčová	1. August 2021	29. April 1991; (elected by Slovak National Council)	Judge of the Supreme Court	chair of a pannel since 2018(then on the Supreme Court)
Marián Trenčan	1. August 2021	1. July 1996; 15. June 2000 (elected by National Council)	Judge of the Supreme Court	Deputy Chief Judge since 12.10. 2021 acting Chief Judge since 19.5.2026 (appointed by President Zuzana Čaputová);
Monika Valašiková	1. August 2021	1. January 1992; (ex lege)	Judge of the Supreme Court	
Jana Martinčeková	20. August 2021	12. December 1996; 6. December 2000 (elected by National Council)	Judge of Regional Court of Žilina	chair of a pannel since 10. December.2021
Michal Novotný	20. August 2021	26. August 2014; (appointed by President Andrej Kiska)	Judge of Rebgional Court of Trnava	chair of a pannel since 1. June. 2022
Katarína Cangárová	26. August 2021	26. August 2021; (appointed by President Zuzana Čaputová)	attorney	
Michal Matulník	26. August 2021	26. August 2021; (appointed by President Zuzana Čaputová)	attorney	chair of a pannel since 15.12. 2022
Peter Potásch	26. August 2021	26. August 2021; (appointed by President Zuzana Čaputová)	University Professor	chair of a pannel since 1.June.2022
Martin Tiso	21. November 2022	21. November 2022; (appointed by President Zuzana Čaputová)	assistant of an Judge of the Supreme Administrative Court	
Michal Dzurdzík	1. January 2023	13. 5. 2013; (appointed by President Ivan Gašparovič)	Judge of Regional Court of Bratislava	chair of a pannel since 21.June 2024
Rastislav Dlugoš	1. June 2023	15. June 2006; (appointed by President Ivan Gašparovič)	Judge of Regional Court Trenčín	
Peter Mach	1. June 2023	14. December 2022; (appointed by President Zuzana Čaputová)	judge of Disctrict Court Bratislava I	
Vlastimil Pavlikovský	1. January 2026	29. oktober 2004; (appointed by President Ivan Gašparovič)	Judge of Regional Court of Bratislava	
Eva Vékonyová	1. January 2026	20. June 2005; (appointed by President Ivan Gašparovič)	Judge of Regional Court of Trenčín	

The judges of the Supreme Administrative court are divided between pannels of 3 and 5 judges and one panel of 7 judges. Lay Judges are also at the Court in disciplinary cases.
