= Court of Cassation (Tunisia) =

Court in Tunisia

The Court of Cassation (French: Cour de cassation) is the highest court in Tunisia. It is based on the model of the French Court of Cassation. In his publication on Tunisian Judicial system: A Continuous Progress toward the Judicial Independence, Baya Amouri described the Court of Cassation or the Tunisian Supreme Court as Tunisia's court of final appeal. The court which was established in 1956 under the name “Tribunal de Cassation” by the decree of August 3, 1956.

== See also ==
- Politics of Tunisia
- Court of cassation (for a list of other courts of cassation around the world)
