= Supreme Court of the Slovak Republic =

- Najvyšší súd Slovenskej republiky
- Interactive map of Supreme Court of the Slovak Republic
- Established: 1 January 1970
- Location: Bratislava, Slovak Republic
- Composition method: Presidential appointment after nomination of the Judicial Council of the Slovak Republic
- Authorised by: Constitution of the Slovak Republic
- Judge term length: life (maximum of 67 years of age)
- Number of positions: 79 (currently 73)
- Website: https://www.nsud.sk/

President
- Currently: JUDr. František Mozner
- Since: 21. maj. 2025

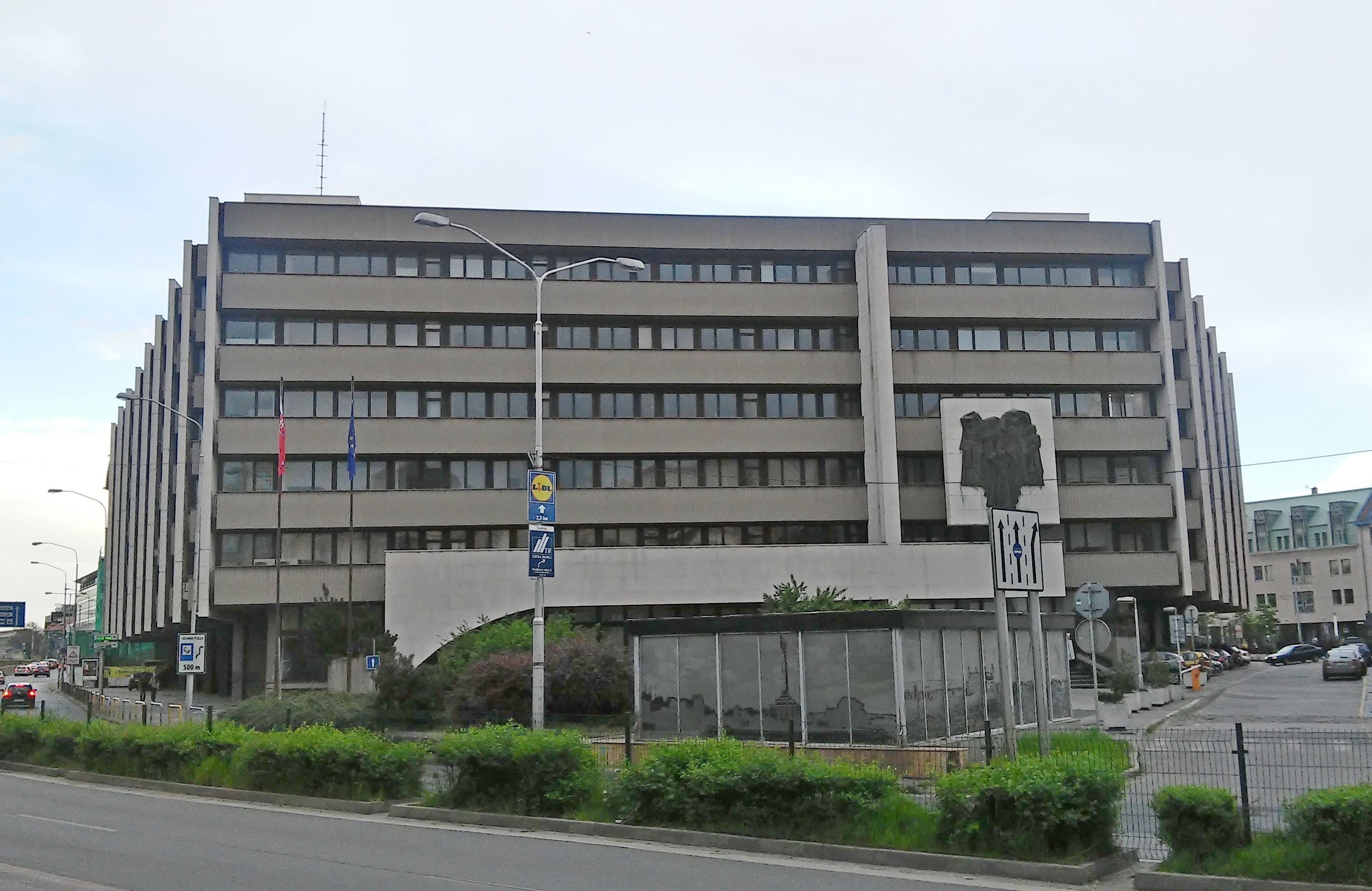
Supreme Court of the Slovak Republic

The Supreme Court of the Slovak Republic is the highest juridical authority in the Slovakia and is based in Bratislava. It was established on 1 January 1993, by succeeding and being the continuation of the Supreme Court of the Slovak Republic inside the federation following the division of Czechoslovakia into the Czech Republic and the Slovak Republic. The court is the ultimate appeals court for the lower courts within Slovakia. For the cases of Administrative law the ultimate court of appeals is Supreme Administrative Court of Slovakia

== History ==
It was established on 1 January 1970, then as the Supreme Court of the Slovak Socialist Republic. It became the supreme court of an independent Slovakia on 1 January 1993.

== Appointment ==
The judges of the Supreme Court are appointed by the President of the Slovak Republic after being seen as qualified enough by the Judicial Council of the Slovak Republic. Any person who has fulfilled 30 years of age, is in possession of a master's degree in law and agrees to accept the post of a judge at Supreme Court after having passed the electoral process, may qualify for the post.

== Roles ==
It is the appeals court for the regional and district courts as well as for the Slovak military courts. The court decides in panels composed by three or five judges. The three member panels decide on the matters regarding the lower courts. The five member panel decides on matters which concern verdicts of courts composed by the three member panels of the Supreme Court.

== Judges and panels ==
The court has four divisions, which are the Criminal Division, the Civil Division and the Commercial Division. Each division includes an amount of panels with three members. The Commercial Division has fourteen judges serving in eight panels, the civil division has twenty-nine judges and 8 panels, and the Criminal Division has nineteen judges and eight panels.

== Controversy ==
In October 2020, Supreme Court judges Jarmila Urbancová and Jozef Kolcon were accused of corruption and arrested.
