= Supreme Court of Judicature (Guyana) =

High Court of Guyana

The Supreme Court of Judicature is Guyana's Supreme court. It exercises original jurisdiction over serious matters in Guyana of which a lower court (or, a magistrate's court) does not have the proper authority to operate and/or act on. Both Criminal and Civil appeals are made to the Supreme Court before moving to an appeals court. Thus, in Guyana the court hierarchy is a magistrate's court, the Supreme Court, and then the Appeals Court.The Supreme Court's hierarchy is a chancellor as the president of the court, assisted by a chief justice, with additional advisory justices if needed.
