= Life tenure =

Term of office that lasts for the office holder's lifetime

A life tenure or service during good behaviour is a term of office that lasts for the office holder's lifetime, unless the office holder decides personally to resign or is removed from office because of misbehaving in office or due to extraordinary circumstances.

Some judges and members of upper chambers (e.g., senators for life) have life tenure. The primary goal of life tenure is to insulate the office holder from external pressures. Certain heads of state, such as monarchs and presidents for life, are also given life tenure. United States federal judges have life tenure once appointed by the president and confirmed by the Senate.

In some cases, life tenure lasts only until a mandatory retirement age. For example, Canadian senators are appointed for life, but are forced to retire at 75. Likewise, many judges, including justices of the Supreme Court of the United Kingdom and the Supreme Court of Canada, have life tenure but must retire at 75. In some jurisdictions, a judge who reaches mandatory retirement age may continue to serve as a supernumerary judge, but may no longer have the guarantees of tenure.

Life tenure also exists in various religious organizations. The Pope, as the Bishop of Rome and leader of the worldwide Catholic Church, has life tenure, but other Catholic bishops are required to submit their resignations at age 75.

Senior professors at academic institutions may also be granted life tenure, which is intended to protect principles of academic freedom.
