= Judiciary of Germany =

Overview of German court system

The judiciary of Germany is the system of courts that interprets and applies the law in Germany.

The German legal system is a civil law mostly based on a comprehensive compendium of statutes, as compared to the common law systems. In criminal and administrative law, Germany uses an inquisitorial system where the judges are actively involved in investigating the facts of the case, as compared to an adversarial system where the role of the judge is primarily that of an impartial referee between the prosecutor or plaintiff and the defendant or defense counsel.

In Germany, the independence of the judiciary is historically older than democracy. The organisation of courts is traditionally strong, and almost all federal and state actions are subject to judicial review.

Judges follow a distinct career path. At the end of their legal education at university, all law students must pass a state examination before they can continue on to an apprenticeship that provides them with broad training in the legal profession over two years. They then must pass a second state examination that qualifies them to practice law. At that point, the individual can choose either to be a lawyer or to enter the judiciary. Judicial candidates start working at courts immediately. However, they are subjected to a probationary period of up to five years before being appointed as judges for life.

The judicial system is established and governed by part IX of the Basic Law for the Federal Republic of Germany. Article 92 of the Basic Law establishes the courts, and states that "the judicial power shall be vested in the judges; it shall be exercised by the Federal Constitutional Court, by the federal courts provided for in this Basic Law, and by the courts of the Länder."

== History ==
Germany used jury trials from the Middle Ages onwards, for example in the Landgerichte. The jury system was implemented in the German Empire by the Gerichtsverfassungsgesetz (GVG) of 27 January 1877 with the jury court (Schwurgericht) consisting of 3 judges and 12 jurymen. During a state of emergency under Article 48 (of the Weimar Constitution), and about one month before the trial of Adolf Hitler February 1924 for the Beer Hall Putsch of November 1923, the Emminger Reform (a Notverordnung, or emergency decree) was passed in January 1924 abolishing juries and replacing them with the mixed system of judges and lay judges that is still used today.

== Law ==
Germany's legal system is a civil law system, whose highest source of law is the 1949 Basic Law for the Federal Republic of Germany (which serves as the nation's constitution), which sets up the modern judiciary, but the law adjudicated in court comes from the German Codes; thus, German law is primarily codal in nature. The court system adjudicates (1) public law (öffentliches Recht), that is, administrative law (civil-government litigation or litigation between two government bodies) and criminal law, and (2) private law (Privatrecht). German law—especially private law—is mainly based on early Byzantine law, specifically Justinian's Code, and to a much lesser extent the Napoleonic Code.

German law is not impregnated with legal positivism to the extent of Napoleonic legal systems, so Germany's judiciary is not subordinated to the legislature; the Basic Law directly invests supreme judicial power in the Constitutional Court as well as other federal courts and the courts of each Länder, and case law has greater importance, though not to the extent of common law systems.

In contrast to the adversarial system used by common law countries, the German system of criminal (and administrative) procedure is inquisitorial. Rather than allowing cross-examination between the defense and prosecutors, the judges conduct the majority of the trial. During a trial, the parties are expected to give all their evidence to the judges, who will then call forward and question the witnesses, after which the defense counsel and prosecutor may question the witnesses.

== Courts ==
The primary legislation concerning court organization is the Courts Constitution Act (Gerichtsverfassungsgesetz, or GVG). The courts are characterized by being specialist, regional, and hierarchically integrated at the federal level. There are five basic types of courts, plus the Federal Constitutional Court and the Länder's constitutional courts:

- Ordinary courts, dealing with criminal and most civil cases
- Administrative law courts
- Tax law courts
- Labour law courts
- Social law courts
- Constitutional law courts, focusing on judicial review and constitutional interpretation

The main difference between the Federal Constitutional Court and the Federal Court is that the Federal Constitutional Court may only be called if a constitutional matter within a case is in question (e.g., a possible violation of human rights in a criminal trial), while the Federal Court of Justice may be called in any case. Only the Constitutional Court can declare an Act of Parliament invalid.

Ordinary courts are the most numerous by far. Currently there are 828 ordinary courts (687 local, 116 regional, 24 appellate, one federal), 142 labour courts (122 local, 19 appellate, one federal), 69 administrative courts (52 local, 16 higher, one federal), 20 tax courts (19 local, one federal), 86 social courts (69 local, 16 appellate, one federal) and 17 constitutional courts (16 State Constitutional Courts, one Federal Constitutional Court).

More recently, specialized commercial courts have been created. In January 2018, the Chamber for International Commercial Disputes of the Landgericht Frankfurt am Main was established. There is also the Commercial Court based in Stuttgart and Mannheim specializing in major commercial and international disputes.

=== Ordinary courts ===
Trial courts in criminal matters are composed of:

Trial Court		Composition	Jurisdiction
Amtsgerichte	Strafrichter	1 judge	Criminal offences in which the sentence is expected to be less than two years.
Amtsgerichte	Schöffengericht	1 or 2 judges, 2 lay judges	Criminal offenses in which the sentence is expected to be between two and four years.
Landgerichte	große Strafkammer or Staatsschutzkammer	2 or 3 judges, 2 lay judges	Cases in which the sentence is expected to exceed four years, cases where the prosecutor decided to be not tried by Amtsgerichte, and minor political crimes.
Landgerichte	Schwurgericht or Wirtschaftsstrafkammer	3 judges, 2 lay judges	Specially constituted Strafkammer for felonies resulting in death and economics crimes.
Oberlandesgerichte	Strafsenat	3 or 5 judges	Serious political crimes.

The appellate courts in criminal matters are composed of:

Appellate Court		Composition	Jurisdiction
Landgerichte	kleine Strafkammer	1 judge, 2 lay judges	Appeal for review of facts and law from the Amtsgerichte.
Oberlandesgerichte	Strafsenat	3 judges	Appeal for error of law from certain decisions of Amtsgerichte.
Bundesgerichtshof (Federal Court of Justice)	Strafsenat	5 judges	Appeal for error of law from trial decisions of the Landgerichte and Oberlandesgerichte.

For a comparison of the relative activity of the ordinary courts, in 1969 there were 468,273 criminal cases in Germany, and 388,619 or 83% of these were held in the Amtsgericht composed of a single judge.

=== Specialized courts ===
Specialized courts deal with five distinct subject areas: administrative, labour, social, fiscal, and patent law. Like the ordinary courts, they are organized hierarchically with the state court systems under a federal appeals court.

- Administrative law courts (Verwaltungsgerichte) consist of local administrative courts, higher administrative courts, and the Federal Administrative Court. In these courts, individuals can have wrongful administrative acts overturned. For instance, many lawsuits have been brought in administrative courts by citizens against the government concerning the location and safety standards of nuclear power plants. They also decide certain disputes between governmental institutions, eg between a municipality and a state agency or between mayor and council of a municipality. The Federal Administrative Court (Bundesverwaltungsgericht), located in Karlsruhe, is the highest administrative law court.
- Labour law courts (Arbeitsgerichte) also function on three levels and address disputes over collective bargaining agreements and working conditions. The Federal Labour Court (Bundesarbeitsgericht), located in Erfurt, is the highest labour law court.
- Social law courts (Sozialgerichte), organized at three levels, adjudicate cases relating to the system of social insurance, which includes unemployment compensation, workers' compensation, and social security payments. They are also responsible for several other cases on social security law, like support for disabled persons or victims of crimes. The Federal Social Court (Bundessozialgericht), located in Kassel, is the highest social law court.
- Fiscal Courts (Finanzgerichte), also called tax law courts or finance courts, hear tax-related cases and have only a two-tier structure. The Federal Fiscal Court (Bundesfinanzhof), located in Munich, is the highest tax law court and hears appeals against the decisions of the Fiscal Courts.
- The Federal Patent Court hears certain intellectual property cases on patents, utility rights and trademarks. In patent, utility rights and trademark matters there is a bifurcation of judiciary responsibilities in Germany between the Federal Patent Court and the various German Regional Courts. This bifurcated court system has a long tradition in Germany and is based on the notion that decisions of the Deutsches Patent- und Markenamt (German Patent and Trademark Office) shall be checked by a particular court created for that purpose, namely, the Federal Patent Court in Munich. Court of appeals is in all cases the (ordinary) Federal Court of Justice of Germany.

=== Constitutional courts ===
==== State ====
Each one of the Länder has its own state constitutional court (see e.g. the Constitutional Court of the State of Berlin or the Constitutional Court of Saxony). These courts are administratively independent and financially autonomous from any other government body. For instance, a state constitutional court can write its own budget and hire or fire employees, powers that represent a degree of independence unique in the government structure. The courts of each state are also directly authorized by the Basic Law for the Federal Republic.

==== Federal ====
The Federal Constitutional Court (Bundesverfassungsgericht, or BVerfG) is the supreme constitutional court established by the constitution or Basic Law of Germany. Since its inception with the beginning of the Federal Republic of Germany, the court has been located in the city of Karlsruhe—intentionally in a certain geographical distance from the other federal institutions in Berlin (earlier in Bonn), Munich, and Frankfurt.

The sole task of the court is judicial review, and it may declare any federal or state legislation unconstitutional, thus rendering them ineffective. In this respect, it is similar to other supreme courts with judicial review powers, like the Supreme Court of the United States; yet the Court possesses a number of additional powers, and is regarded as among the most interventionist and powerful national courts in the world. Unlike other supreme courts, the constitutional court is not an integral stage of the judicial or appeals process (aside from in cases concerning constitutional or public international law), and does not serve as a regular appellate court from lower courts or the Federal Supreme Courts on any violation of federal laws.

The court's jurisdiction is focused on constitutional issues and the compliance of all governmental institution with the constitution. Constitutional amendments or changes passed by the Parliament are subject to its judicial review, since they have to be compatible with the most basic principles of the Grundgesetz (per the "eternity clause"), those being the principles of human dignity, unalienable human rights, democracy, republicanism, social responsibility, federalism and separation of powers (separation of the judiciary from political powers).

The court's practice of enormous constitutional control frequency on the one hand, and the continuity in judicial restraint and political revision on the other hand, have created a unique defender of the Grundgesetz since World War II and given it a valuable role in Germany's modern democracy.

== Personnel ==
=== Professional judges ===
The federal courts are administered by the federal government; all the other courts belong to a state and are administered by it. The independence of the judiciary that is laid down in the federal constitution (article 97 para. 1) only refers to the judicial decision-making process of any individual judge, not to the judicial power as a whole. In line with this, the courts are administrative bodies subordinate to the respective department of justice, special rules only applying to the judicial decision-making process and the status of the judges.

All professional judges are members of a common corps into which they are recruited through a common process and their career is governed largely by federal law. However, most judges are state (Länder) civil servants and follow state rules on legal education, appointment, and promotion.

==== State ====
As a rule, each decision on the initial employment, vesting with lifetime tenure or promotion of a judge is taken by the department of justice. Yet in some of the states there is some kind of a parliamentary body that needs to be heard or even has a say in some of the decisions on careers of individual judges (Richterwahlausschuss). The mostly decisive influence of the administration on the career of judges is exceptional in continental Europe, where mostly bodies of judges, elected by and within the judiciary take this kind of decision (e.g., France: conseil superieur de la magistrature, Italy: consiglio superiore della magistratura). By some it is regarded as a threat to judicial independence that with a view to their personal career judges might be inclined to specially regard possible political effects of their decisions or may choose to support a political party.

==== Federal ====
Federal judges are picked in an in camera procedure by a body composed of a Minister of the federal state, federal MPs and ministers of the states (article 95 para. 2 of the federal constitution). Candidates do not have to be professional judges, but must be lawyers. There are neither public hearings, nor would the identity of any candidate even be disclosed to the public. Judicial members of the federal constitutional court are elected in turns by the federal chambers (article 94 of the federal constitution). This decision requiring a large majority, it usually follows a political compromise. Public discussion about candidates is very unusual.

=== Lay judges ===
Lay judges (Schöffen) are ordinary members of the public selected for this role by a special committee, at the suggestion of a municipal council, for a five-year term. Lay judges must be German citizens who have neither been convicted of nor are under investigation for any serious crime. In addition, certain groups of individuals shall not be chosen as lay judges, such as people under the age of 25 or over the age of 69, or individuals working in the court system in a professional capacity (such as lawyers and judges). In addition, individuals over the age of 65 may refuse to serve, as may, for instance, members of federal or state legislatures, doctors, nurses, and those who have served as lay judges in the preceding term. Applications to become lay judges can be made by interested citizens and local governments will typically encourage applications before a new term begins. Welfare institutions, sports clubs, financial and health insurance institutions, trade unions, industrial companies and other public authorities are sometimes called upon to nominate candidates.

Except for most crimes for which the trier of fact is a single professional judge and serious political crimes which are tried before a panel of professional judges, all charges are tried before mixed tribunals on which lay judges sit alongside professional judges. The German Code of Criminal Procedure requires a two-thirds majority for most decisions unfavorable to the defendant; denial of probation by simple majority is an important exception. In most cases, lay judges do not have access to the case file.

The lay judges needed to staff the various tribunals are selected by a selection committee from lists that are passed by the municipal councils (Gemeinderat) with a two-thirds majority of attending local councillors. Given the high threshold for inclusion on the municipal council lists, in practice these lists are first compiled by municipal bureaucracies and the political parties in Germany, but some municipal councils rely on registers of residents and generate names randomly. The selection committee consists of a judge from the Amtsgericht, a representative of the state government, and ten "trusted citizens" (Vertrauenspersonen, German: [fɛɐ̯ˈtʁaʊ̯ənspɛʁˌzoːnən]) who are also elected by two thirds of the municipal council.

Lay judges have historically been predominantly middle-aged men from middle-class backgrounds; more recently, the share of male and female judges was about the same. A study conducted in 1969 found that, of the lay judges in its sample, approximately 25% were civil service employees, compared to only about 12% from blue-collar backgrounds. A study published in 2009 put the proportions at 27% civil service employees versus 8% of the general population and noted the relatively high numbers of housewives, the relatively low number of private sector employees, and the relative old age of lay judges.

=== Prosecutors ===
Public prosecutors, who earn as much as judges, are nonetheless simple ordinary servants lacking the independence of the Bench.

The switching between prosecutorial office and the bench is not only accepted but encouraged so as to allow for the greatest amount of experience.

=== Attorneys ===
A lawyer can only qualify as a defense attorney if they fulfill/possess the so-called Befähigung zum Richteramt. This translates literally as "aptitude to be a judge"; however, the basic meaning is to have successfully completed a study of law at roughly a master's degree level, being finally examined by the state itself (Staatsexamen), and to have served for two years as an associate to different lawyers from each of their most popular occupations (attorney, judge, administrative official, etc.; this is called the Referendariat). However, to actually become a judge, besides the Befähigung zum Richteramt the expectations include outstanding results in the respective exams, which is not expected for attorneys (but, roughly, is expected for prosecutors and administrative officials).

Defense attorneys are grouped into divisions of their local or state bar associations in which membership is mandatory.

== Sentencing practices ==
If a defendant is convicted, the court will usually credit the period of pre-trial confinement as part of the sentence. Sentences can range from one month to life, and typically do not exceed 15 years. Defendants sentenced to life in prison can typically apply for parole after 15 years, and if the application is rejected, the defendant can re-apply after a set period no longer than two years. If the court determines that there is a "severe gravity of guilt", parole can be delayed for a non-specific period beyond 15 years.

In addition to reducing an offender's sentence, Germany's corrections system has a form of punishment called suspended sentencing. Depending on the crime, some sentences can take away jail or prison time and replace it with probation. If a person is convicted of a crime, they can be put on a probationary sentence where they do not have to go to prison if "the person sentenced should demonstrate that being sentenced was itself sufficient warning that he will not commit any further crimes". Despite having to be put under "supervision of a probation officer", the person is able to avoid the negative aspects of prison such as being "torn away from his previous life, work, and social contracts". Sentences of six months or less are automatically suspended by the court as well as those sentences between six months to a year unless it is "necessary for the person to serve the sentence to preserve legal order". After an offender serves two thirds of their prison sentence, it is possible to have their sentence suspended. The process for having a sentence suspended after serving time is the same as applying for parole. It is also possible for offenders serving life sentences to receive a suspended sentence after serving at least fifteen years. Just like any other probation sentence, if the offender breaks their probation or commits another crime, they can have their freedom revoked and be sent back to prison.

== Analysis and criticism ==
Selection of lay judges has been described as a "highly political and discriminatory process". It has been argued that personal acquaintance, political affiliation and occupation have all historically played an important, if publicly unacknowledged, role in the selection procedure.
