= Landesgericht (Germany) =

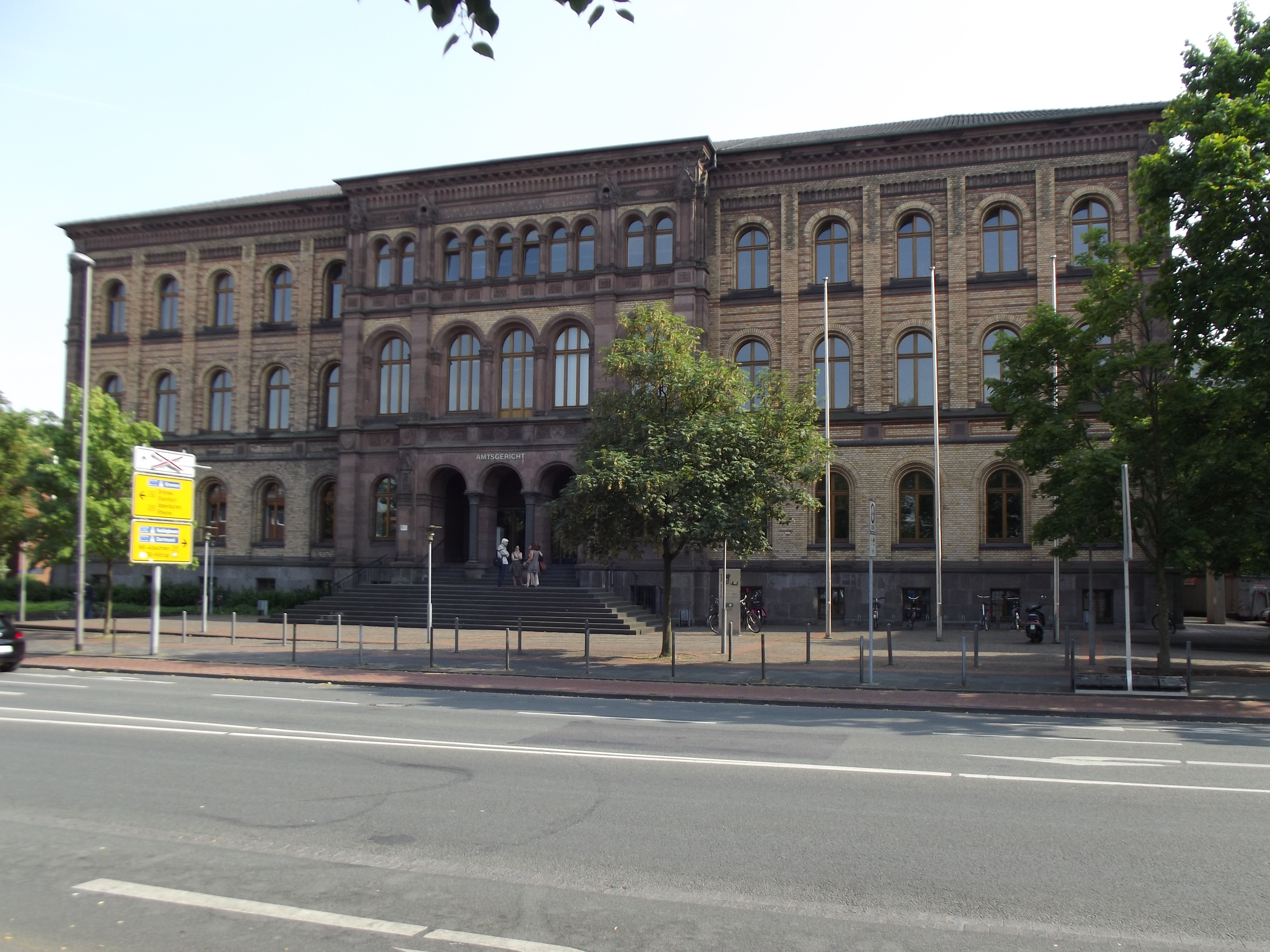
The Amtsgericht in Münster. It is a Landesgericht.

In Germany, Landesgerichte (German: [ˈlandəsɡəˌʁɪçtə]) or Gerichte der Länder are courts which are established and operated by one or several of the sixteen Länder of the Federal Republic of Germany. Their opposite are the Federal Courts. According to article 92 of the Basic Law for the Federal Republic of Germany, the judicial power is exercised by the Constitutional Court, by the Federal Courts enumerated in the Basic Law, and otherwise by the courts of the states.

Courts of the states are:

- Amtsgerichte, Landgerichte and Oberlandesgerichte as the first, second and third instances of ordinary jurisdiction (except some cases in which the Oberlandesgerichte act as federal courts, see the corresponding article)
- Labour Courts and State Labour Courts as the first and second instance of labour jurisdiction
- Administrative Courts and Oberverwaltungsgerichte as the first and second instance of administrative jurisdiction
- Social Courts and State Social Courts as the first and second instance of social jurisdiction
- Finance Courts as the first instance of financial jurisdiction
- the states' constitutional courts.

== See also ==
- Judiciary of Germany
- Landgericht
