= Supreme court =

Highest court in a jurisdiction

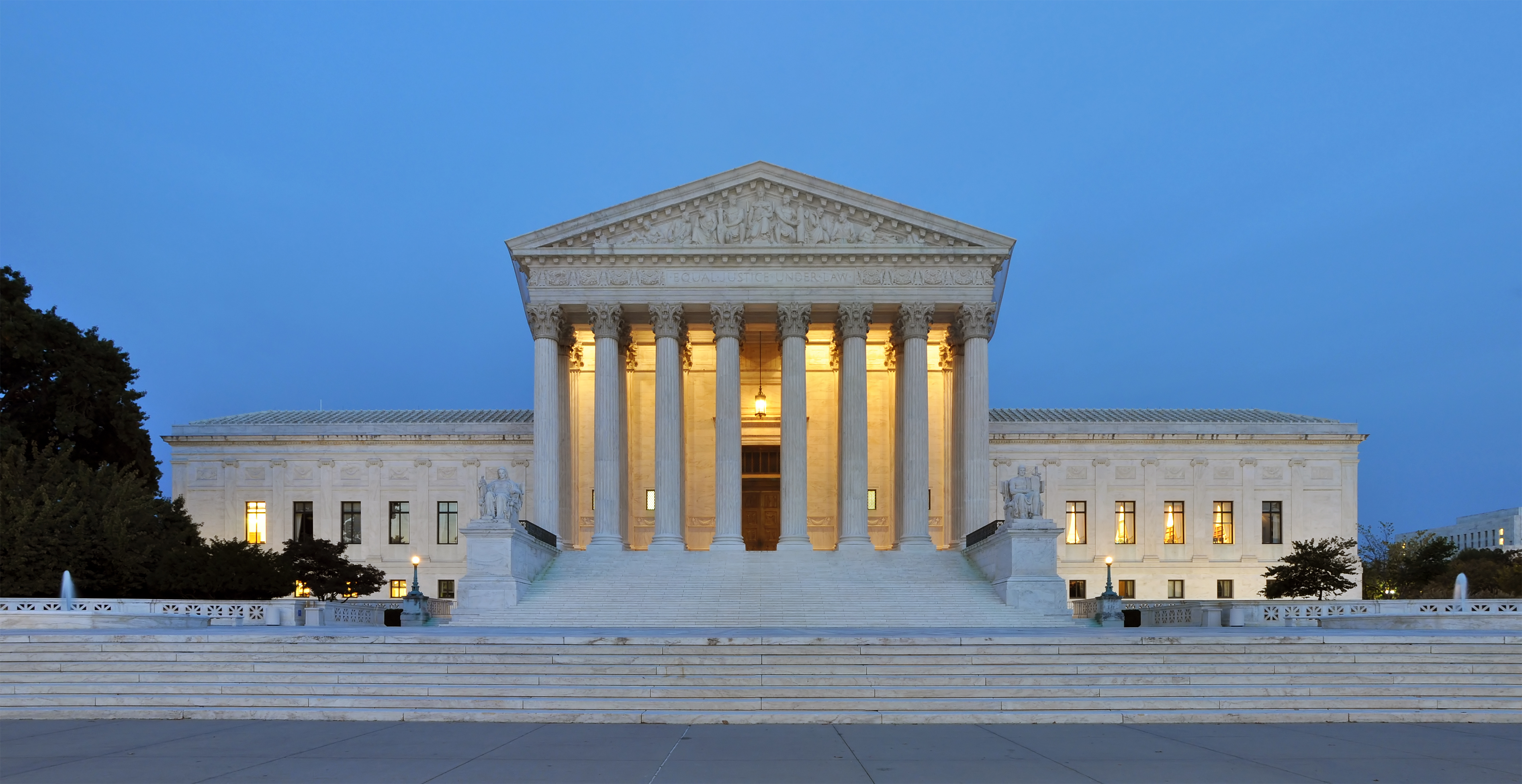
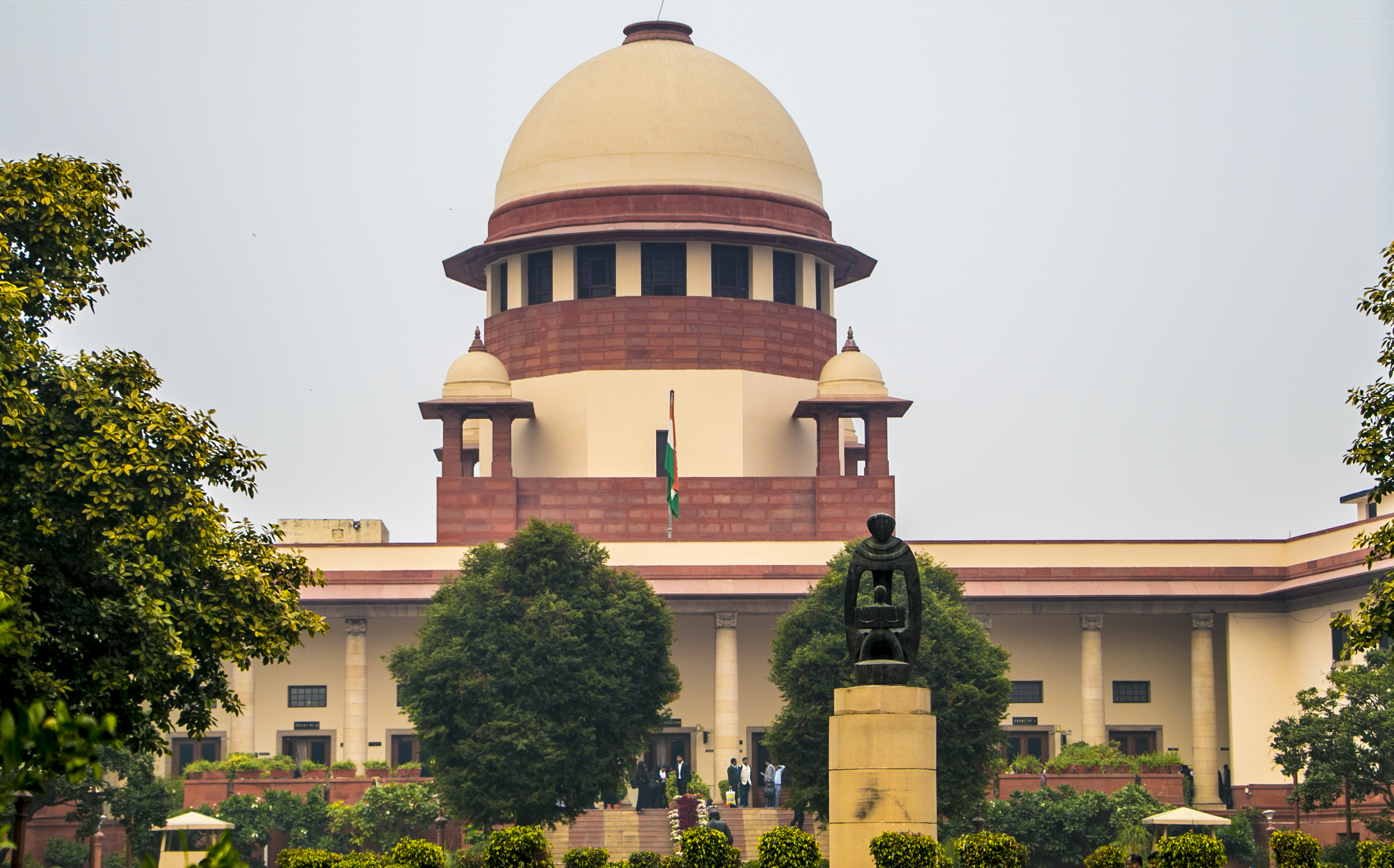
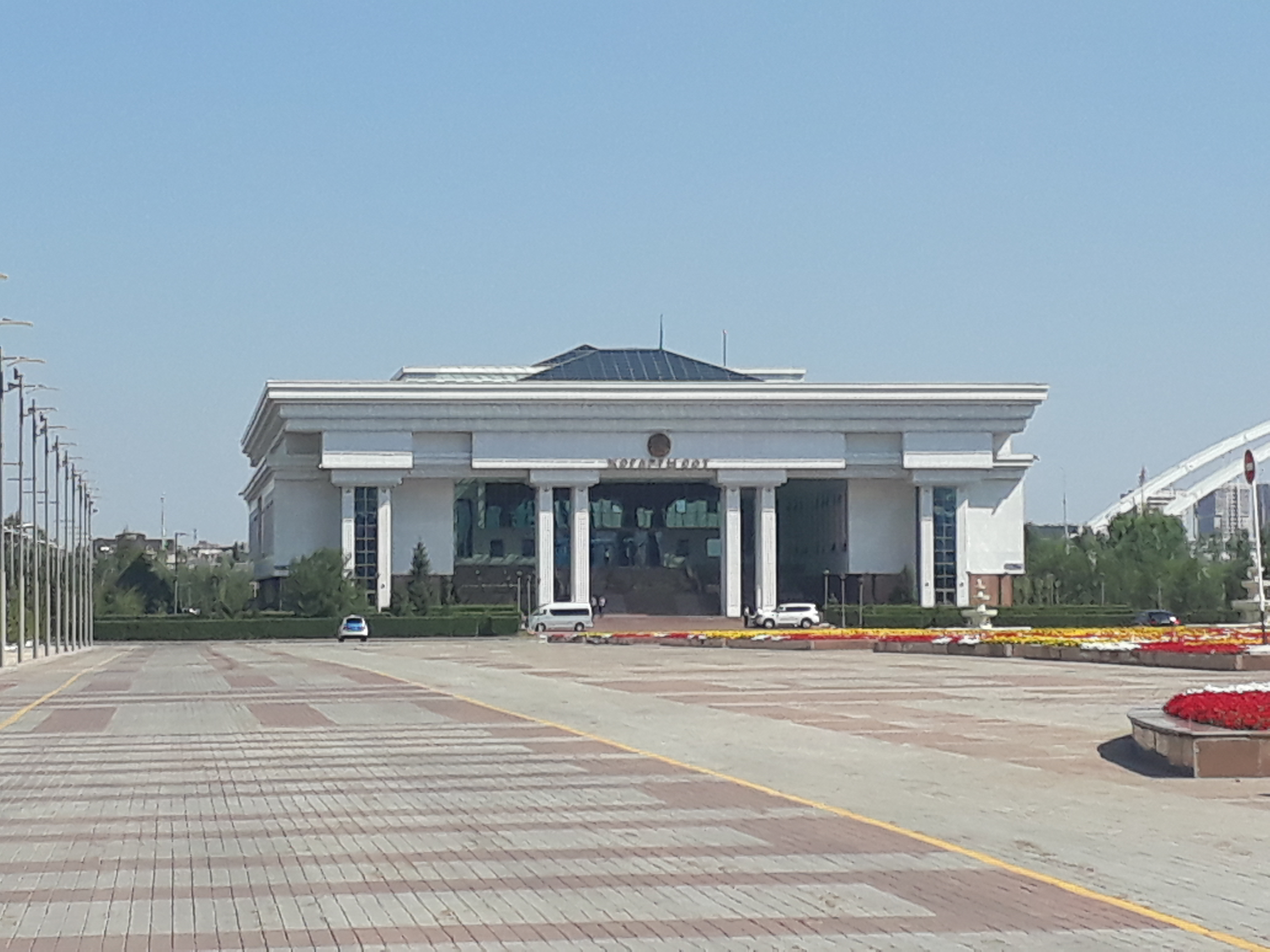
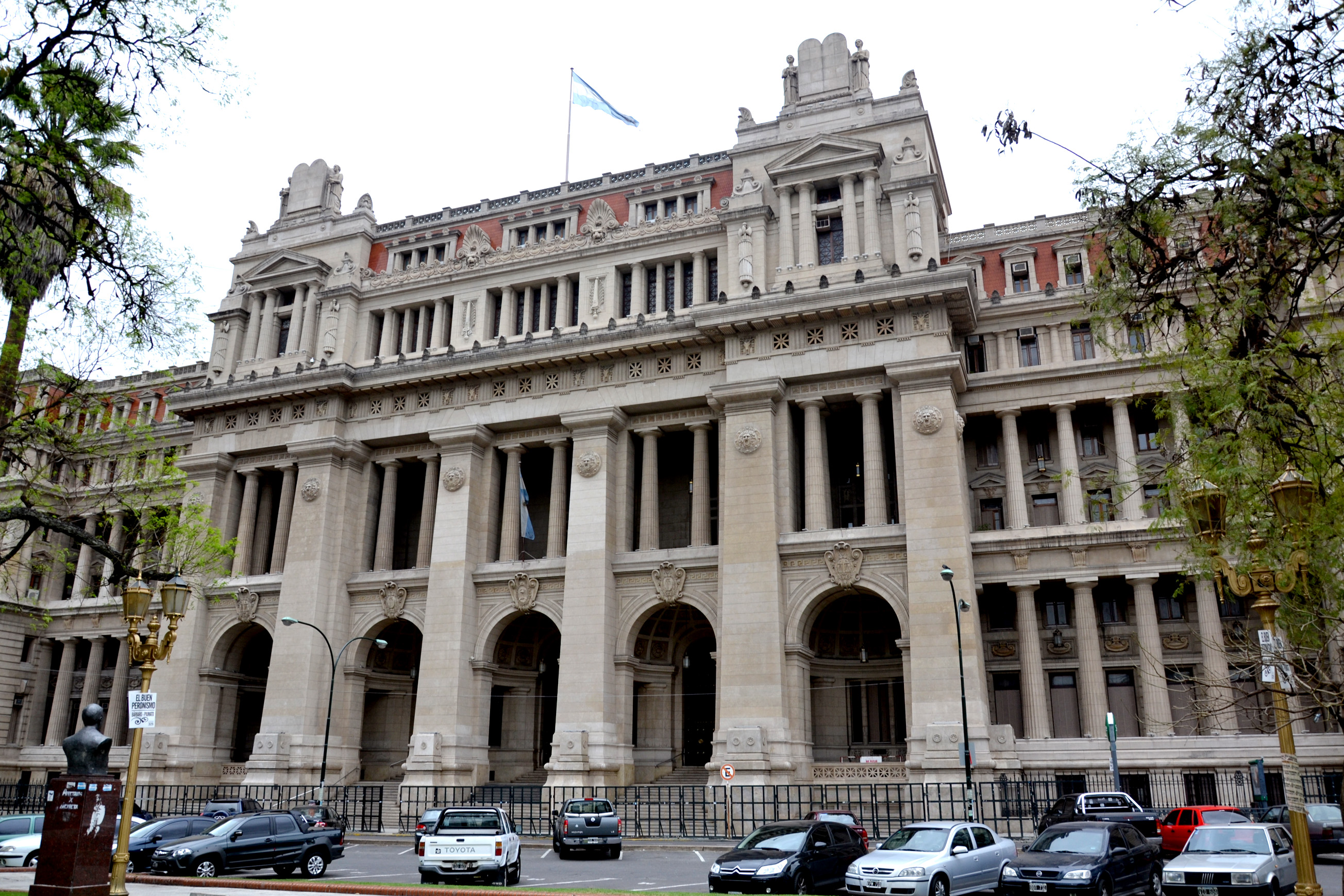
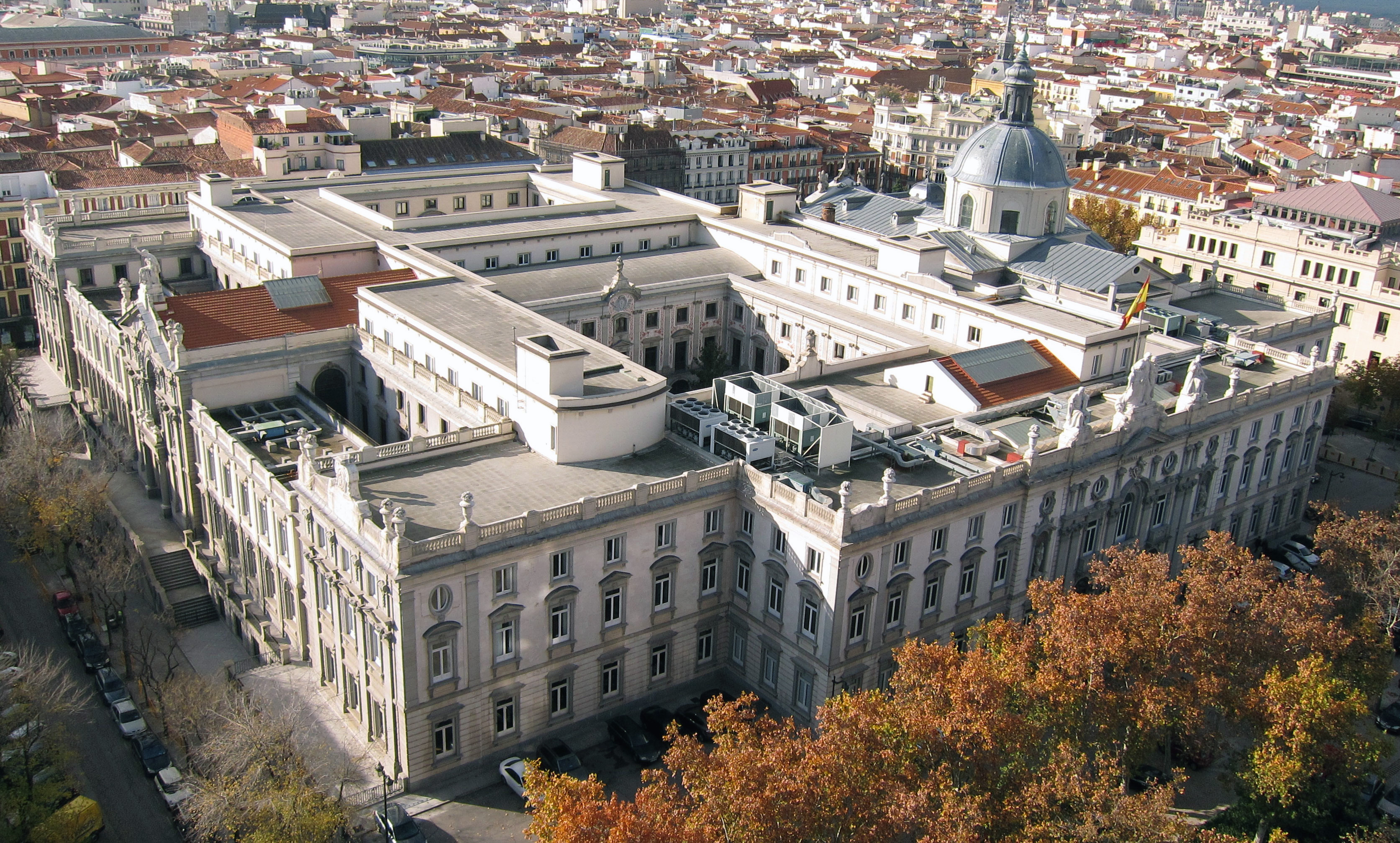
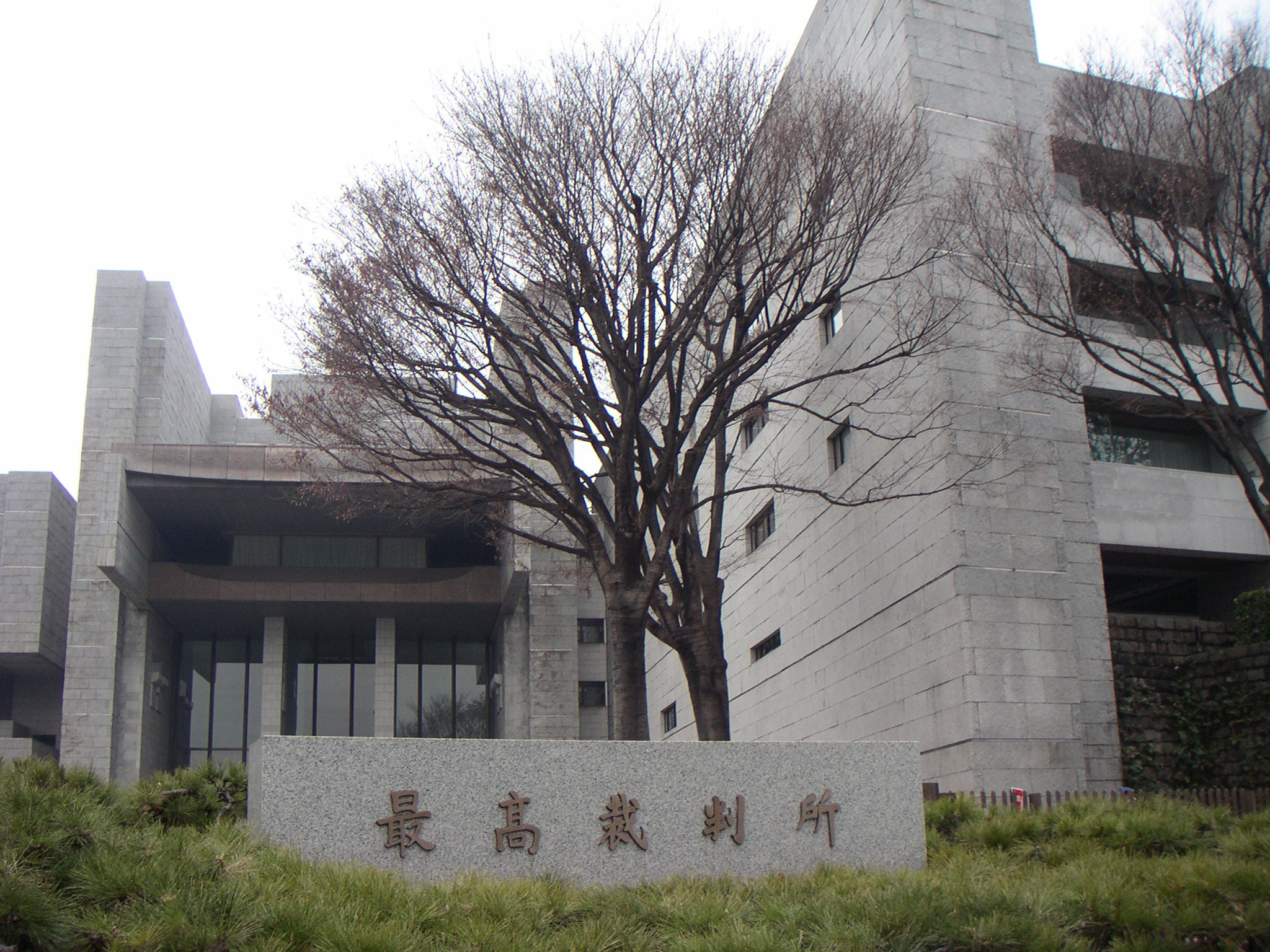
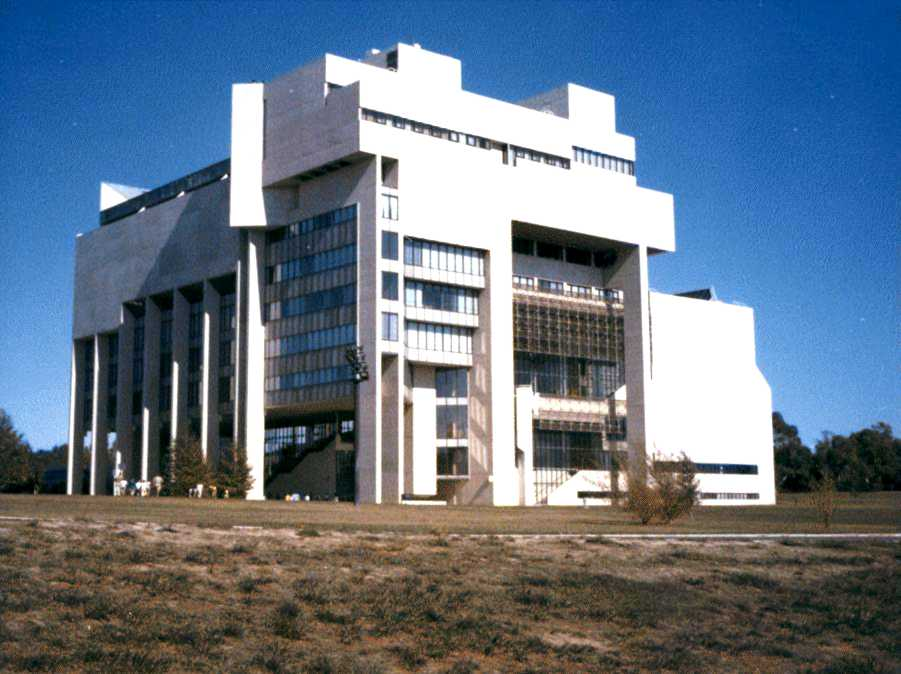
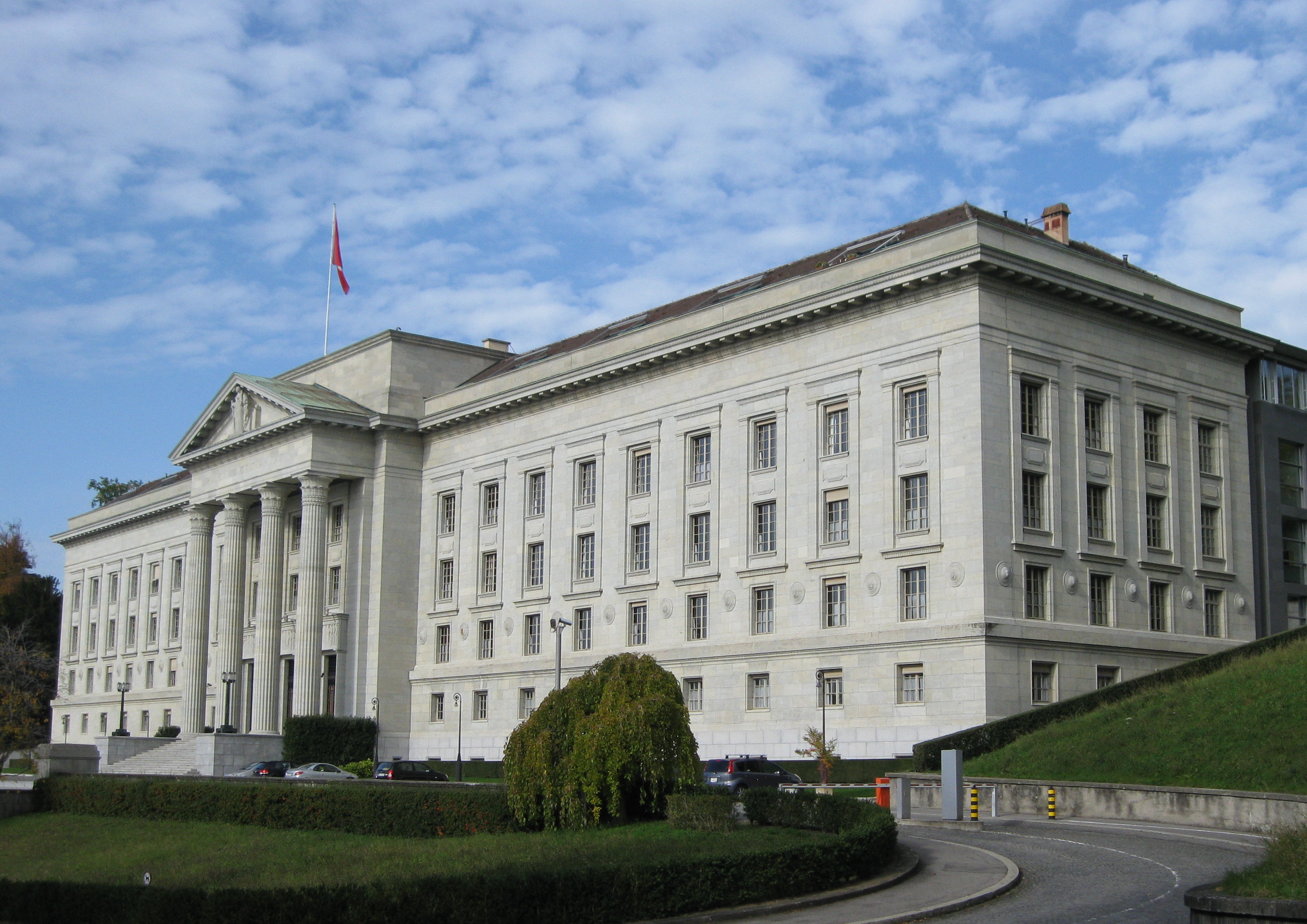
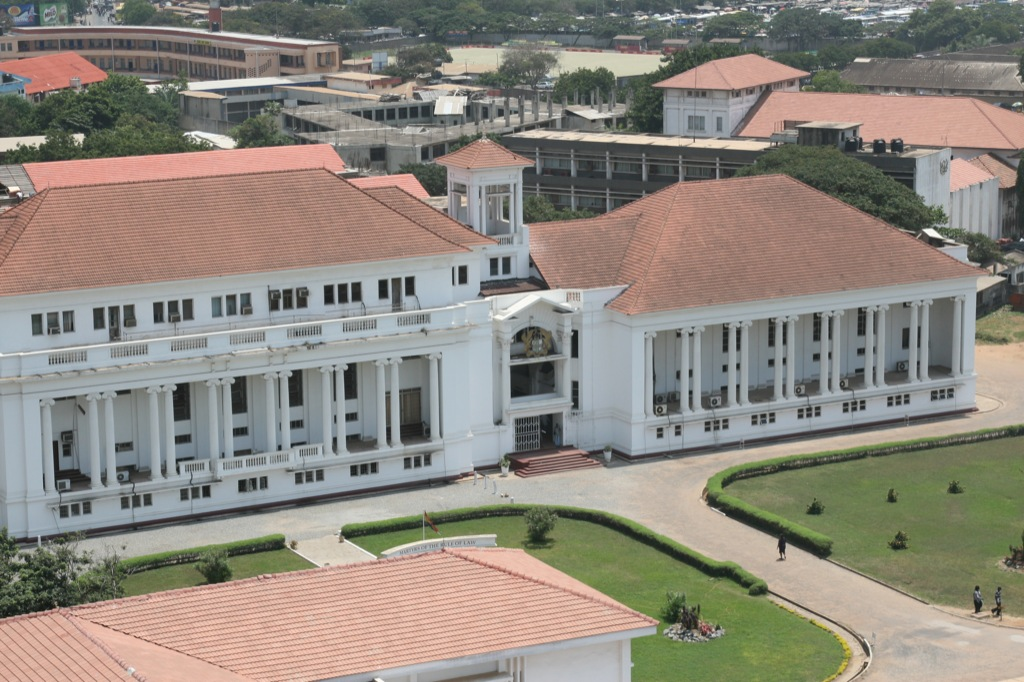
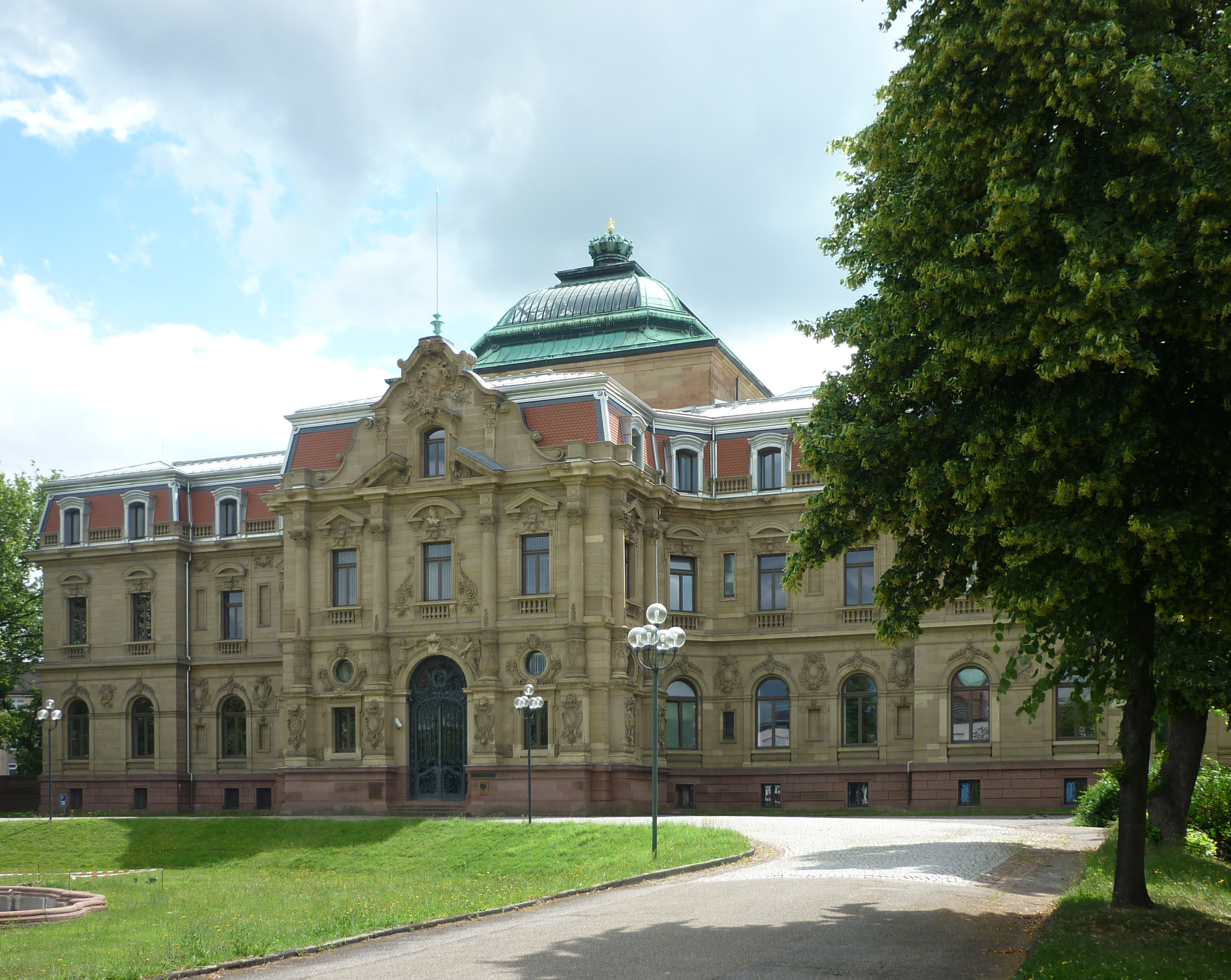
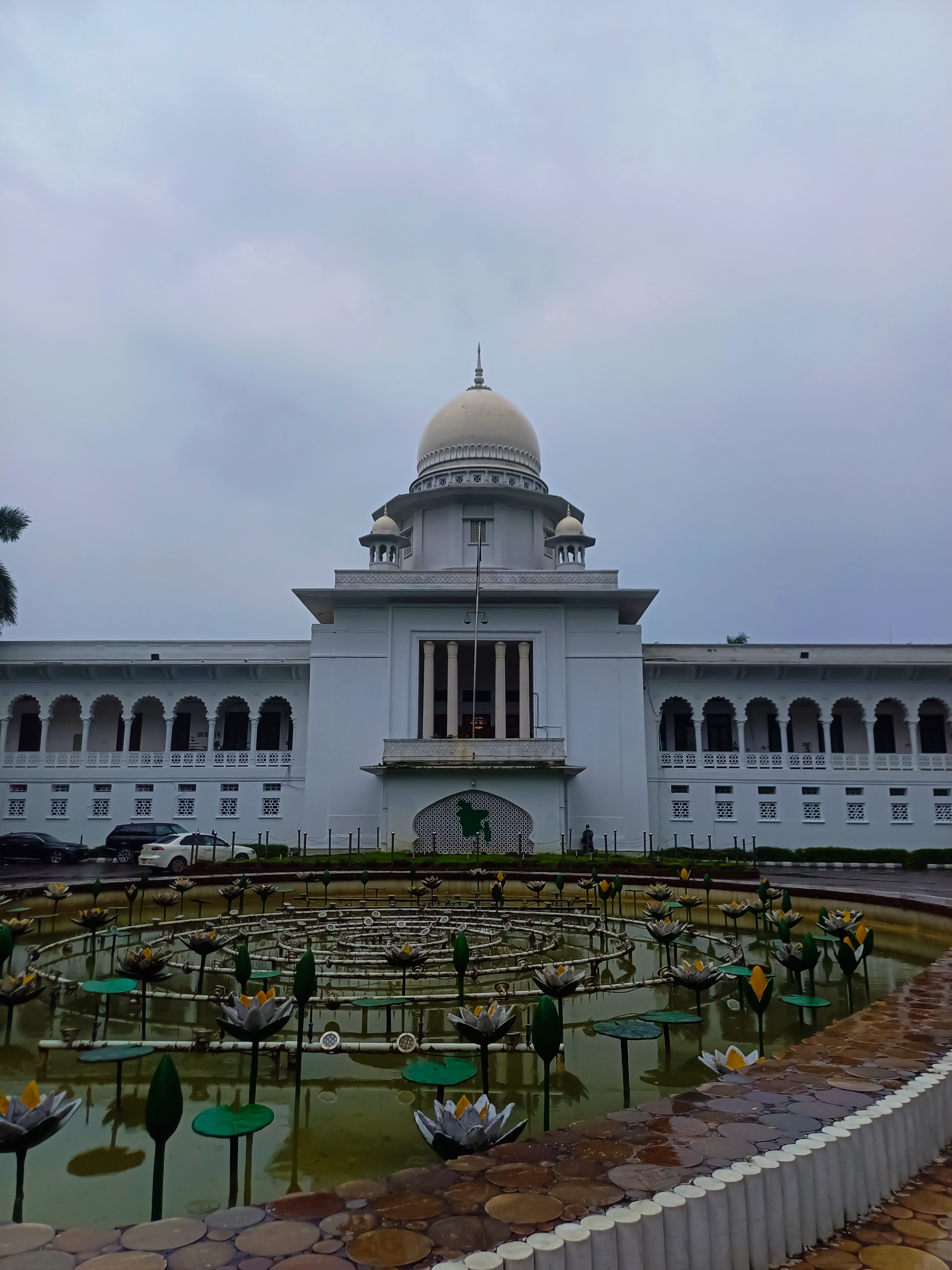
Seats of supreme courts:
- Supreme Court of the United States
- Supreme Court of India

- Supreme Court of Kazakhstan
- Supreme Court of Argentina

- Supreme Court of Costa Rica
- Supreme Court of Spain

- Supreme Court of Japan
- High Court of Australia

- Federal Supreme Court of Switzerland
- Supreme Court of Ghana

- Federal Court of Justice, Germany
- Supreme Court of Bangladesh

In most legal jurisdictions, a supreme court (also known as a court of last resort, apex court, high (or final) court of appeal, and court of final appeal) is the highest court within the hierarchy of courts. Broadly speaking, the decisions of a supreme court are binding on all other courts in a nation and are not subject to further review by any other court. Supreme courts typically function primarily as appellate courts, hearing appeals from decisions of lower trial courts, or from intermediate-level appellate courts. A supreme court can also, in certain circumstances, act as a court of original jurisdiction.

Civil law states tend not to have a single highest court. Some federations, such as the United States, also do not have a single highest court. The highest court in some jurisdictions is not named the "Supreme Court", for example, the High Court of Australia. On the other hand, in some places the court named the "Supreme Court" is not the highest court; examples include the New York Supreme Court, the supreme courts of several Canadian provinces/territories, and the former Supreme Court of Judicature of England and Wales and Supreme Court of Judicature of Northern Ireland, which are all subordinate to higher courts of appeal.

== Single or multiple supreme courts ==
Some countries have multiple "supreme courts" whose respective jurisdictions have different geographical extents, or which are restricted to particular areas of law. Some countries with a federal system of government may have both a federal supreme court (such as the Supreme Court of the United States), and supreme courts for each member state (such as the Supreme Court of Nevada), with the former having jurisdiction over the latter only to the extent that the federal constitution extends federal law over state law. However, other federations, such as Canada, may have a supreme court of general jurisdiction, able to decide any question of law. Jurisdictions with a civil law system often have a hierarchy of administrative courts separate from the ordinary courts, headed by a supreme administrative court (such as the Supreme Administrative Court of Finland, for example). A number of jurisdictions also maintain a separate constitutional court or other judicial or quasi-judicial body (first developed in the Czechoslovak Constitution of 1920), such as Austria, France, Germany, Italy, Luxembourg, Portugal, Russia, Spain and South Africa. Within the former British Empire, the highest court within a colony was often called the "Supreme Court", even though appeals could be made from that court to the United Kingdom's Privy Council (based in London). A number of Commonwealth jurisdictions retain this system, but many others have reconstituted their own highest court as a court of last resort, with the right of appeal to the Privy Council being abolished.

=== Divisions within a single court ===
In some cases, a single supreme court may be divided into multiple divisions or chambers with jurisdiction over different areas of law. For example, the Supreme Court of Spain is divided into five ordinary chambers dealing with civil law, criminal law, administrative law, labour law, and military law respectively along with four special chambers.

== History ==
The idea of a supreme court owes much to the framers of the Constitution of the United States. It was while debating the division of powers between the legislative and executive departments that delegates to the 1787 Constitutional Convention established the parameters for the national judiciary. Creating a separate "third branch" of government was a novel idea; in the English tradition, judicial power is just one aspect of the sovereign authority of the Crown. It was also proposed in the Constitutional Convention that the judiciary should have a role in checking the executive power to exercise a veto or to revise laws. In the end, the Framers of the Constitution compromised by sketching only a general outline of the judiciary, vesting of federal judicial power in "one supreme Court, and in such inferior Courts as the Congress may from time to time ordain and establish". They delineated neither the exact powers and prerogatives of the Supreme Court nor the organization of the Judicial Branch as a whole.

== Common law jurisdictions ==
In jurisdictions using a common law system, the doctrine of stare decisis applies, whereby the principles applied by the supreme court in its decisions are binding upon all lower courts; this is intended to apply a uniform interpretation and implementation of the law. In civil law jurisdictions the doctrine of stare decisis is not generally considered to apply, so the decisions of the supreme court are not necessarily binding beyond the immediate case before it; however, in practice the decisions of the supreme court usually provide a very strong precedent, or jurisprudence constante, for both itself and all lower courts.

=== Australia ===
The High Court of Australia is the supreme court in the Australian court hierarchy and the final court of appeal in Australia. It has both original and appellate jurisdiction, the power of judicial review over laws passed by the Parliament of Australia and the parliaments of the states, and the ability to interpret the Constitution of Australia and thereby shape the development of federalism in Australia.

The High Court is mandated by section 71 of the Constitution, which vests in it the judicial power of the Commonwealth of Australia. The Court was constituted by, and its first members were appointed under, the Judiciary Act 1903. It now operates under sections 71 to 75 of the Constitution, the Judiciary Act 1903, and the High Court of Australia Act 1979. It is composed of seven Justices: the Chief Justice of Australia, currently Stephen Gageler AC, and six other Justices. They are appointed by the Governor-General of Australia on the advice of the federal government, and under the constitution must retire at age 70.

=== Bangladesh ===
Supreme Court of Bangladesh (SCB) (Note: Bengali: বাংলাদেশ সুপ্রীম কোর্ট, romanized: Baṅladeś Suprim Korṭ, pronounced [ˈbaŋlaˌdeʃ ˈsupɾim ˈkoɾt]) is the highest court of law in the People's Republic of Bangladesh. It is composed of the High Court Division and the Appellate Division, and was established by Part VI, Chapter I (Article 94) of the Constitution of Bangladesh, adopted in 1972. This is also the office of the chief justice, Appellate Division judges, and High Court Division judges of Bangladesh. As of February 2026, the Appellate Division consists of 6 judges, while the High Court Division has 103 judges (77 are permanent and 26 are additional).

=== Hong Kong ===
In Hong Kong, the Supreme Court of Hong Kong (now known as the High Court of Hong Kong) was the final court of appeal during its colonial times which ended with transfer of sovereignty in 1997. The final adjudication power, as in any other British Colonies, rested with the Judicial Committee of the Privy Council (JCPC) in London, United Kingdom. Now the power of final adjudication is vested in the Court of Final Appeal created in 1997. Under the Basic Law, its constitution, the territory remains a common law jurisdiction. Consequently, judges from other common law jurisdictions (including England and Wales) can be recruited and continue to serve in the judiciary according to Article 92 of the Basic Law. On the other hand, the power of interpretation of the Basic Law itself is vested in the Standing Committee of the National People's Congress (NPCSC) in Beijing (without retroactive effect), and the courts are authorised to interpret the Basic Law when trying cases, in accordance with Article 158 of the Basic Law. This arrangement became controversial in light of the right of abode issue in 1999, raising concerns for judicial independence.

=== India ===
The Supreme Court of India is the supreme judicial authority and the highest court in India. It is the highest appellate court for all civil and criminal cases in India. The court is led by the Chief Justice of India and has a maximum sanctioned strength of 37 judges excluding the chief justice. It was established on 28 January 1950, two days after India became a republic, and replaced the Judicial Committee of the Privy Council and the Federal Court of India as the highest court of appeal. It has operated from the Supreme Court building in New Delhi since 1958. With expansive authority to initiate actions and wield appellate jurisdiction over all courts and the ability to invalidate amendments to the constitution, the Supreme Court of India is widely acknowledged as one of the most powerful supreme courts in the world.

=== Ireland ===
The Supreme Court is the highest court in the Republic of Ireland. It has authority to interpret the constitution, and strike down laws and activities of the state that it finds to be unconstitutional. It is also the highest authority in the interpretation of the law. Constitutionally it must have authority to interpret the constitution but its further appellate jurisdiction from lower courts is defined by law. The Irish Supreme Court consists of its presiding member, the Chief Justice, and seven other judges. Judges of the Supreme Court are appointed by the President in accordance with the binding advice of the Government. The Supreme Court sits in the Four Courts in Dublin.

The Supreme Court of the Irish Free State was subordinate to the Privy Council until 1933, when the right of appeal to the Privy Council from Ireland was abolished.

=== Nauru ===
In Nauru, there is no single highest court for all types of cases. The Supreme Court has final jurisdiction on constitutional matters, but any other case may be appealed further to the Appellate Court. In addition, an agreement between Nauru and Australia in 1976 provided for appeals from the Supreme Court of Nauru to the High Court of Australia in both criminal and civil cases, with the notable exception of constitutional cases.

=== New Zealand ===
In New Zealand, the right of appeal to the Privy Council was abolished following the passing of the Supreme Court Act (2003). A right of appeal to the Privy Council remains for criminal cases which were decided before the Supreme Court was created, but it was the case of Teina Pora in 2015 was the final case to the Privy Council from New Zealand – which ruled in his favour.

The new Supreme Court of New Zealand was officially established at the beginning of 2004, although it did not come into operation until July. The High Court of New Zealand was until 1980 known as the Supreme Court. The Supreme Court has a purely appellate jurisdiction and hears appeals from the Court of Appeal of New Zealand. In some cases, an appeal may be removed directly to the Supreme Court from the High Court. For certain cases, particularly cases which commenced in the District Court, a lower court (typically the High Court or the Court of Appeal) may be the court of final jurisdiction.

=== Nigeria ===
The Supreme Court of Nigeria is the highest court in Nigeria. The Supreme Court mainly regulates in disputes between states and/or the federal government. Another power of the Supreme court rests in its authority to oversee any decisions over presidential elections and term lengths.

=== Pakistan ===
The Supreme Court has been the apex court for Pakistan since the declaration of the republic in 1956 (previously the Privy Council had that function from 1947 to 1950 and the Federal Court of Pakistan from 1950 to 1956). The Supreme Court has the final say on matters of constitutional law, federal law or on matters of mixed federal and provincial competence. It can hear appeals on matters of provincial competence only if a matter of a constitutional nature is raised.

With respect to Pakistan's autonomous territories (i.e. Azad Kashmir and Gilgit-Baltistan) the Supreme Court's jurisdiction is rather limited and varies from territory to territory; it can hear appeals only of a constitutional nature from Azad Kashmir and Gilgit-Baltistan. Azad Kashmir has its own courts system and the constitution of Pakistan does not apply to it as such; appeals from Azad Kashmir relate to its relationship with Pakistan.

The provinces have their own courts system, with the High Court as the apex court, except insofar as where an appeal can go to the Supreme Court as mentioned above.

=== United Kingdom ===
The Supreme Court of the United Kingdom is the ultimate court for criminal and civil matters in England, Wales and Northern Ireland and for civil matters in Scotland. (The supreme court for criminal matters in Scotland is the High Court of Justiciary.) The Supreme Court was established by the Constitutional Reform Act 2005 with effect from 1 October 2009, replacing and assuming the judicial functions of the House of Lords. Devolution issues under the Scotland Act 1998, Government of Wales Act and Northern Ireland Act were also transferred to the new Supreme Court by the Constitutional Reform Act, from the Judicial Committee of the Privy Council.

The Supreme Court shares its members and accommodation at the Middlesex Guildhall in London with the Judicial Committee of the Privy Council which hears final appeals from certain smaller Commonwealth realm countries, admiralty cases, and certain appeals from the ecclesiastical courts and statutory private jurisdictions, such as professional and academic bodies.

(The Constitutional Reform Act also renamed the Supreme Court of Judicature of Northern Ireland to the Court of Judicature, and the rarely cited Supreme Court of Judicature for England and Wales as the Senior Courts of England and Wales).

The Supreme Court was set up in 2009; until then the House of Lords was the ultimate court in addition to being a legislative body, and the Lord Chancellor, with legislative and executive functions, was also a senior judge in the House of Lords.

=== United States ===
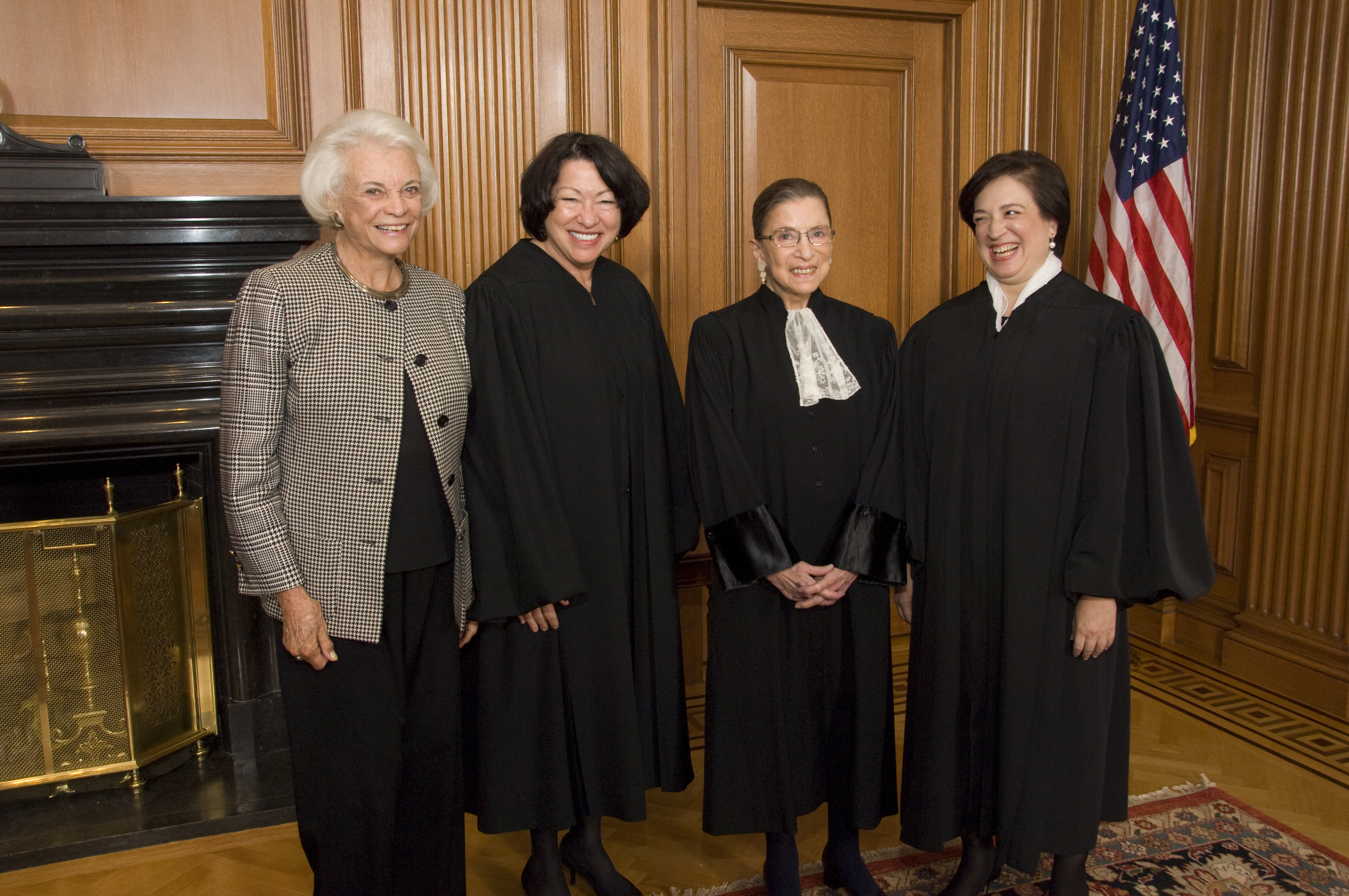
The first four female justices of the Supreme Court of the United States: Sandra Day O'Connor, Sonia Sotomayor, Ruth Bader Ginsburg and Elena Kagan.

The Supreme Court of the United States, established in 1789, is the highest federal court in the United States. It has final appellate powers over the federal court system, and can perform judicial review in matters involving US federal law (which applies to all the states). There are currently nine members of the US Supreme Court; however, there is no number specified in the Constitution. New members are nominated to life terms by the President of the United States and must be confirmed by the Senate. There are no specific requirements set out in the Constitution for Supreme Court nominees.

Each U.S. state also has its own state supreme court, the highest authority in interpreting that state's law and administering that state's judiciary. The courts of Oklahoma and Texas have separate criminal and civil courts of last resort, while Delaware has separate courts for appellate and equity functions.

The official names of state supreme courts vary, as do the titles of its members, which can cause confusion between jurisdictions. Alternative names for supreme courts includes Court of Appeals, Supreme Court of Appeals and Supreme Judicial Court. However the New York Supreme Court, Appellate Division is a lower court, not a supreme court. The titles for judicial officeholders can cause confusion, even within the same jurisdiction. In Texas, the posts of Justice, Judge, and Justices of the Peace are members of successively lower levels of courts.

== Civil law jurisdictions ==
The Roman law and the Corpus Juris Civilis are generally held to be the historical model for civil law. From the late 18th century onwards, civil law jurisdictions began to codify their laws, most of all in civil codes.

=== Argentina ===
The Supreme Court functions as a last resort tribunal. Its rulings cannot be appealed. It also decides on cases dealing with the interpretation of the constitution (for example, it can overturn a law passed by Congress if it deems it unconstitutional).

=== Armenia ===
According to the Armenian constitution the Court of Cassation of Armenia is the highest court in Armenia, except in the sphere of constitutional justice, in which the Constitutional Court of Armenia maintains authority.

=== Austria ===
In Austria, the Austrian Constitution of 1920 (based on a draft by Hans Kelsen) introduced judicial review of legislative acts for their constitutionality. This function is performed by the Constitutional Court (Verfassungsgerichtshof), which is also charged with the review of administrative acts on whether they violate constitutionally guaranteed rights. Other than that, administrative acts are reviewed by the Administrative Court (Verwaltungsgerichtshof). The Supreme Court (Oberste Gerichtshof (OGH)), stands at the top of Austria's system of "ordinary courts" (ordentliche Gerichte) as the final instance in issues of private law and criminal law.

=== Brazil ===
In Brazil, the Supreme Federal Court (Supremo Tribunal Federal) is the highest court. It is both the constitutional court and the court of last resort in Brazilian law. It only reviews cases that may be unconstitutional or final habeas corpus pleads for criminal cases. It also judges, in original jurisdiction, cases involving members of congress, senators, ministers of state, members of the high courts and the President and Vice-President of the Republic. The Superior Court of Justice (Superior Tribunal de Justiça) reviews State and Federal Circuit courts decisions for civil law and criminal law cases, when dealing with federal law or conflicting rulings. The Superior Labour Court (Tribunal Superior do Trabalho) reviews cases involving labour law. The Superior Electoral Court (Tribunal Superior Eleitoral) is the court of last resort of electoral law, and also oversees general elections. The Superior Military Court (Tribunal Superior Militar) is the highest court in matters of federal military law.

=== Croatia ===
In Croatia, the supreme jurisdiction is given to the Supreme Court, which secures a uniform application of laws. The Constitutional Court exists to verify constitutionality of laws and regulations, as well as decide on individual complaints on decisions on governmental bodies. It also decides on jurisdictional disputes between the legislative, executive and judicial branches.

=== Denmark ===
In Denmark, all ordinary courts have original jurisdiction to hear all types of cases, including cases of a constitutional or administrative nature. As a result, there exists no special constitutional court, and therefore final jurisdiction is vested with the Danish Supreme Court (Højesteret) which was established 14 February 1661 by king Frederik III.

=== France ===
In France, supreme appellate jurisdiction is divided among three judicial bodies:

- for judicial cases, i.e., civil or criminal matters: Court of Cassation (Cour de cassation)
- for administrative cases: Council of State (Conseil d'État)
- constitutional challenges of statutory laws: Constitutional Council (Conseil constitutionnel)

When there is jurisdictional dispute between judicial and administrative courts: the Court of Arbitration (Tribunal des conflits), which is empanelled half from the Court of Cassation and half from the Council of State and presided over by the Minister of Justice, is called together to settle the dispute or hand down a final decision.

The High Court (Haute Cour) exists only to impeach the President of the French Republic in case of "breach of his duties patently incompatible with his continuing in office". Since a constitutional amendment of 2007, the French Constitution states that the High Court is composed of all members of both Houses of Parliament. As of 2023, it has never been convened.

Members of the French government, except the President, are subject to the same laws as other French citizens. However, since 1993, a new and different court was introduced to judge them in place of normal courts, the Justice Court of the Republic (Cour de Justice de la République). It has since been highly criticized and its abolition was recommended in 2022 after a public consultation.

=== Germany ===
In Germany, there is no de jure single supreme court. Instead, cases are decided in the final instance by one of five federal high courts (see below), depending on their nature.

Final interpretation of the German Constitution, the Grundgesetz, is the task of the Bundesverfassungsgericht (Federal Constitutional Court), which is the de facto highest German court, as it can declare both federal and state legislation ineffective. In addition, it has the power to overrule decisions of all other courts, despite not being a court of appeals in the German court system. It is also the only court possessing the power and authority to outlaw political parties, should their manifests or activism prove unconstitutional.

When it comes to civil and criminal cases, the Bundesgerichtshof (Federal Court of Justice) is at the top of the hierarchy of courts. The other branches of the German judicial system each have their own appellate systems, each topped by a high court; these are the Bundessozialgericht (Federal Social Court) for matters of social security, the Bundesarbeitsgericht (Federal Labour Court) for employment and labour, the Bundesfinanzhof (Federal Fiscal Court) for taxation and financial issues, and the Bundesverwaltungsgericht (Federal Administrative Court) for administrative law. The so-called Gemeinsamer Senat der Obersten Gerichtshöfe (Joint Senate of the Supreme Courts) is not a supreme court itself, but an ad-hoc body that is convened only when one high court intends to diverge from another high court's legal opinion. As the courts have well-defined areas of responsibility, situations like these are rather rare and the Joint Senate gathers very infrequently.

=== Iceland ===
The Supreme Court of Iceland (Icelandic: Hæstiréttur Íslands, lit. Highest Court of Iceland) was founded under Act No. 22/1919 and held its first session on 16 February 1920. The Court holds the highest judicial power in Iceland. The court system was transformed from a two level system to a three level system in 2018 with the establishment of Landsréttur.

=== Indonesia ===
Law of Indonesia at the national level is following of civil law (commonly known as Continental European in Indonesia) from the tradition of Roman-Dutch law.

Indonesian law also recognizes customary law from the tradition of the traditional Adat. The Sharia law is applied in one province: Aceh. Laws in regional jurisdictions can vary from province to province as the governors and mayors may issue regulations, although the legal hierarchy of regional laws are lower than the national laws, and the Constitution is at the top.

The Supreme Court of Indonesia is the main judicial arm of the state, functioning as the final court of appeal as well as a means to re-open cases previously closed. The Supreme Court, which consists of a total of 51 justices, also oversees the regional high courts. It was founded at the same year of the country's independence in 1945.

The Constitutional Court of Indonesia, on the other hand, is a part of the judicial branch tasked with review of bills and government actions for constitutionality, as well as regulation of the interactions between various arms of the state. The constitutional amendment to establish the court was passed in 2001, and the court itself was established in 2003. The Constitutional Court consists of nine justices serving nine year terms, and they're appointed in tandem by the Supreme Court, the President of Indonesia and the People's Representative Council.

=== Israel ===
Israel's Supreme Court is at the head of the court system in the State of Israel. It is the highest judicial instance. The Supreme Court sits in Jerusalem. The area of its jurisdiction is the entire State. A ruling of the Supreme Court is binding upon every court, other than the Supreme Court itself. The Israeli supreme court is both an appellate court and the high court of justice. As an appellate court, the Supreme Court considers cases on appeal (both criminal and civil) on judgments and other decisions of the District Courts. It also considers appeals on judicial and quasi-judicial decisions of various kinds, such as matters relating to the legality of Knesset elections and disciplinary rulings of the Bar Association. As the High Court of Justice (Hebrew: Beit Mishpat Gavoha Le'Zedek בית משפט גבוה לצדק; also known by its initials as Bagatz בג"ץ), the Supreme Court rules as a court of first instance, primarily in matters regarding the legality of decisions of State authorities: Government decisions, those of local authorities and other bodies and persons performing public functions under the law, and direct challenges to the constitutionality of laws enacted by the Knesset. The court has broad discretionary authority to rule on matters in which it considers it necessary to grant relief in the interests of justice, and which are not within the jurisdiction of another court or tribunal. The High Court of Justice grants relief through orders such as injunction, mandamus and Habeas Corpus, as well as through declaratory judgments. The Supreme Court can also sit at a further hearing on its own judgment. In a matter on which the Supreme Court has ruled – whether as a court of appeals or as the High Court of Justice – with a panel of three or more justices, it may rule at a further hearing with a panel of a larger number of justices. A further hearing may be held if the Supreme Court makes a ruling inconsistent with a previous ruling or if the Court deems that the importance, difficulty or novelty of a ruling of the Court justifies such hearing. The Supreme Court also holds the unique power of being able to order "trial de novo" (a retrial).

=== Italy ===
Italy has different supreme courts.

The Italian court of last resort for most disputes is the Supreme Court of Cassation. There is also a separate constitutional court, the Constitutional Court, which has a duty of judicial review, and which can strike down legislation as being in conflict with the Constitution. As with France, administrative cases are ruled by the Council of State.

=== Japan ===
In Japan, the Supreme Court of Japan is called 最高裁判所 (Saikō-Saibansho; called 最高裁 Saikō-Sai for short), located in Chiyoda, Tokyo, and is the highest court in Japan. It has ultimate judicial authority within Japan to interpret the Constitution and decide questions of national law (including local bylaws). It has the power of judicial review (i.e., it can declare Acts of Diet and Local Assembly, and administrative actions, unconstitutional).

=== Luxembourg ===
In Luxembourg, challenges on the conformity of the law to the Constitution are brought before the Cour constitutionnelle (Constitutional Court). The most used and common procedure to present these challenges is by way of the "question préjudicielle" (prejudicial question).
The Court of last resort for civil and criminal proceedings is the "Cour de cassation".
For administrative proceedings the highest court is the "Cour administrative" (Administrative Court).

=== Macau ===
The supreme court of Macau is the Court of Final Appeal (Portuguese: Tribunal de Última Instância; Chinese: 澳門終審法院), though like Hong Kong, the power to interpret the Basic Law is vested in the Standing Committee of the National People's Congress (NPCSC) in Beijing, without retroactive effect.

=== Mexico ===
The Supreme Court of Justice of the Nation (Spanish: Suprema Corte de Justicia de la Nación) is the highest court in Mexico.

=== Netherlands ===
In the Netherlands, the Supreme Court of the Netherlands is the highest court. Its decisions, known as "arresten", are absolutely final. The court is banned from testing legislation against the constitution, pursuant to the principle of the sovereignty of the States-General; the court can, however, test legislation against treaties such as the European Convention on Human Rights. Next to the Hoge Raad, in administrative law there are also other highest courts of appeal. Which highest court has jurisdiction in this field of law depends on the subject of the case. The most important of these courts is the Department of Justice of the Council of State (Afdeling Bestuursrechtspraak van de Raad van State).

=== Portugal ===
In Portugal, there are several supreme courts, each with a specific jurisdiction:

- The Supreme Court of Justice (Supremo Tribunal de Justiça) – for judicial (civil and criminal) matters;
- The Constitutional Court (Tribunal Constitucional) – for the constitutional matters;
- The Supreme Administrative Court (Supremo Tribunal Administrativo) – for administrative and fiscal matters;
- The Court of Auditors (Tribunal de Contas) – for auditing the public expenditure.

Until 2003, a fifth supreme court also existed for the military jurisdiction, this being the Supreme Military Court (Supremo Tribunal Militar). Presently, in time of peace, the supreme court for military justice matters is the Supreme Court of Justice, which now includes four military judges.

=== Republic of China (Taiwan) ===
In the Republic of China (Taiwan), there are four different courts of last resort:

- Supreme Court of the Republic of China (中華民國最高法院): civil and criminal cases.
- Supreme Administrative Court of the Republic of China (中華民國最高行政法院): executive cases.
- Disciplinary Court of the Republic of China (中華民國懲戒法院): disciplinary cases of civil servants and judges. (The Public Functionary Disciplinary Sanction Commission was a previous form of disciplinary court until 2020.)
- Constitutional Court (憲法法庭): abstract review of the constitutionality of statutes and regulations, constitutional complaint against the final court decisions, disputes between constitutional organs, dissolution of political parties in violation of the Constitution, protection of local self-governments, uniform interpretation of statutes and regulations, trial of impeachments against the President or Vice President. The Constitutional Court consists of 15 justices. The Council of Grand Justices was a previous Constitutional review organ until 2022.

All four courts are directly under the Judicial Yuan, whose president also serves as Chief Justice of the Constitutional Court.

=== Scotland ===
Founded by papal bull in 1532, the Court of Session is the supreme civil court of Scotland, and the High Court of Justiciary is the supreme criminal court. However, the absolute highest court (excluding criminal matters) is the Supreme Court of the United Kingdom.

=== South Korea ===
In South Korea, role of highest court is divided among two constitutional judicial bodies of judicial branch.

- for major constitutional cases, Constitutional Court of Korea
- for every cases except jurisdiction of the Constitutional Court of Korea, Supreme Court of Korea

=== Spain ===
The Spanish Supreme Court is the highest court for all cases in Spain (both private and public). Only those cases related to human rights can be appealed at the Constitutional Court of Spain (which also decides about acts accordance with the Spanish Constitution).
In Spain, high courts cannot create binding precedents; however, lower rank courts usually observe Supreme Court interpretations. In most private law cases, two Supreme Court judgements supporting a claim are needed to appeal at the Supreme Court.
Five sections form the Spanish Supreme court:

- Section one judges private law cases (including commercial law).
- Section two decides about criminal appeals.
- Section three judges administrative cases and controls government normative powers.
- Section four is dedicated to labour law.
- Section five is dedicated to military justice.

There is also a separate constitutional court, the Tribunal Constitucional, which has a duty of the supreme interpreter of the Spanish Constitution, with the power to determine the constitutionality of acts and statutes made by any public body, central, regional, or local in Spain.

=== Sweden ===
In Sweden, the Supreme Court, founded in 1789, and the Supreme Administrative Court, founded in 1909, respectively function as the highest courts of the land. The Supreme Administrative Court considers cases concerning disputes between individuals and administrative organs, as well as disputes among administrative organs, while the Supreme Court considers all other cases. The judges are appointed by the Government. In most cases, the Supreme Courts will only grant leave to appeal a case (prövningstillstånd) if the case involves setting a precedent in the interpretation of the law. Exceptions are issues where the Supreme Court is the court of first instance. Such cases include an application for a retrial of a criminal case in the light of new evidence, and prosecutions made against an incumbent minister of the Government for severe neglect of duty. If a lower court has to try a case which involves a question where there is no settled interpretation of the law, it can also refer the question to the relevant Supreme Court for an answer.

=== Switzerland ===
In Switzerland, the Federal Supreme Court of Switzerland is the final court of appeals. Due to Switzerland's system of direct democracy, it has no authority to review the constitutionality of federal statutes, but the people can strike down a proposed law by referendum. According to settled case law, however, the Court is authorised to review the compliance of all Swiss law with certain categories of international law, especially the European Convention of Human Rights.

=== Sri Lanka ===
In Sri Lanka, the Supreme Court of Sri Lanka was created in 1972 after the adoption of a new Constitution. The Supreme Court is the highest and final superior court of record and is empowered to exercise its powers, subject to the provisions of the Constitution. The court rulings take precedence over all lower Courts. The Sri Lankan judicial system is complex blend of both common-law and civil-law. In some cases such as capital punishment, the decision may be passed on to the President of the Republic for clemency petitions. However, when there is 2/3 majority in the parliament in favour of president (as with present), the supreme court and its judges' powers become nullified as they could be fired from their positions according to the Constitution, if the president wants. Therefore, in such situations, Civil law empowerment vanishes.

=== Thailand ===
Historically, citizens appealed directly to the King along his route to places out of the Palace. A Thai King would adjudicate all disputes. During the reign of King Chulalongkorn, an official department for appeals was set up, and, after Thailand adopted a western-styled government, Thai Supreme Court was established in 1891.

At present, the Supreme Court of Thailand retains the important status as the highest court of justice in the country. Operating separately from the Administrative Court and the Constitutional Court of Thailand, the judgement of the Supreme Court is considered as final.

=== Turkey ===
The Supreme Court is one of Turkey's four highest judicial authorities. Judicial justice is the final review authority of the decisions and judgments issued by the courts of first instance and that the law does not leave to another judicial authority.

The decisions of the Court of Appeal's General Assembly on the Unification of Judgments are binding on judges. This is not a separate appellate body but an assembly of the Court of Appeal which renders decisions regarding points of laws on which its different chambers disagree.

=== United Arab Emirates ===
In the United Arab Emirates, the Federal Supreme Court of the United Arab Emirates was created in 1973 after the adoption of the Constitution. The Supreme Court is the highest and final superior court of record and is empowered to exercise its powers, subject to the provisions of the Constitution. The court rulings take precedence over all lower Courts. The Emirati judicial system is complex blend of both Islamic law and civil law. In some cases such as capital punishment, the decision may be passed on to the President of the country (currently Mohamed bin Zayed Al Nahyan).

=== Other civil law jurisdictions ===
- For Honduras, see Supreme Court of Honduras.
- For Peru, see Supreme Court of Peru.
- For Poland, see Supreme Court of the Republic of Poland.
- For Romania, see High Court of Cassation and Justice.
- For Uganda, see Supreme Court of Uganda
- For Ukraine, see Supreme Court of Ukraine.
- For Uruguay, see Supreme Court of Uruguay.

== Mixed-system jurisdictions ==
=== Canada ===
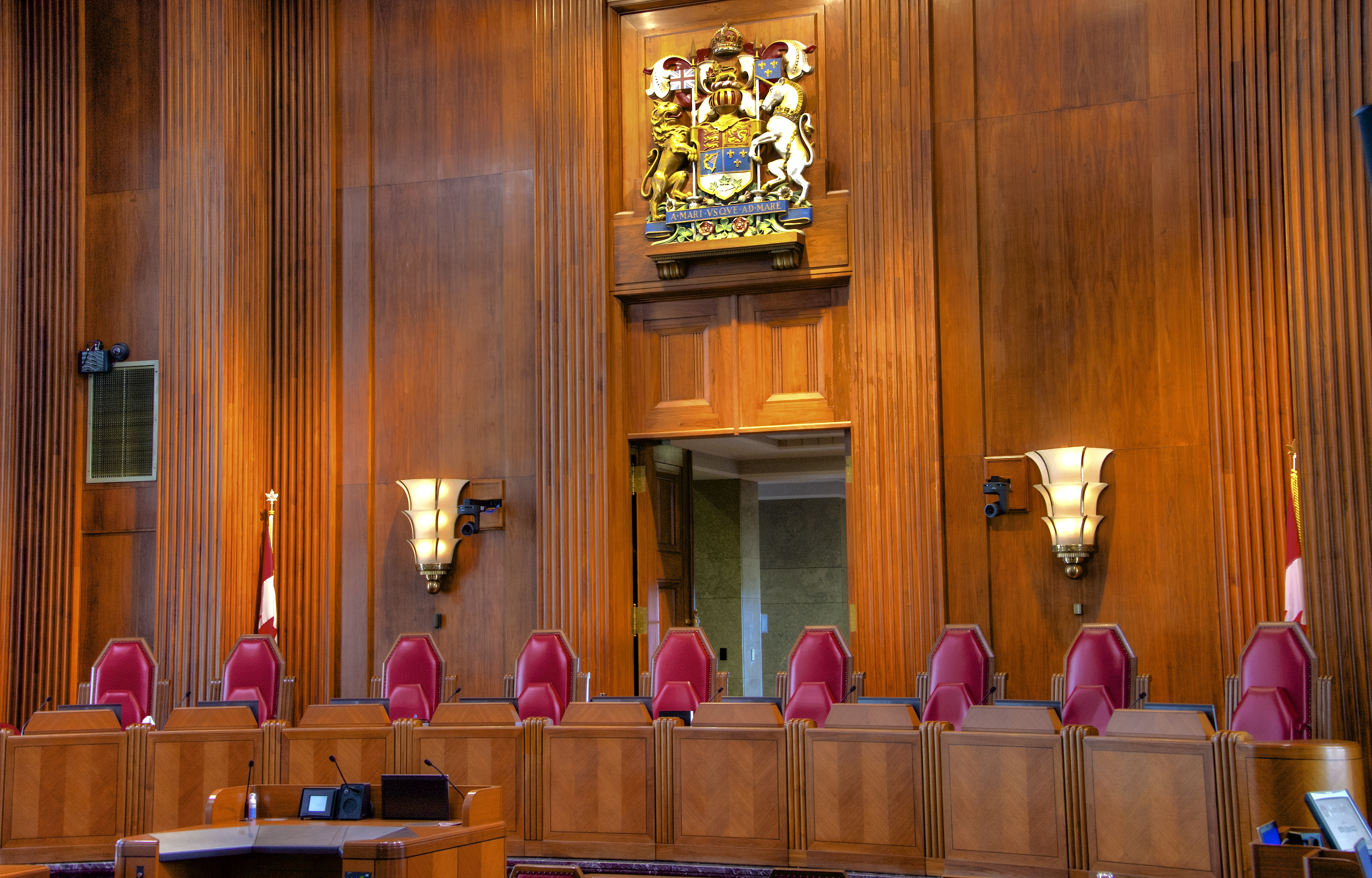
The courtroom of the Supreme Court of Canada

Canada is a bi-jural country. Nine of the provinces use the common law, while the province of Quebec uses the civil law. Federal public law is based on the common law, but federal statute law must take into account both legal systems.

The Supreme Court of Canada was established in 1875. It is defined by the Constitution Act, 1867 and by the Supreme Court Act as a "General Court of Appeal". As a result, it can hear appeals on any legal issues considered by lower courts, on issues of constitutional law, federal law and provincial law. It can hear appeals involving the common law and the civil law, and has full authority to rule on those issues. The Court can hear appeals from the courts of appeal from the provinces and territories, and also appeals from the Federal Court of Appeal. The court's decisions are final and binding on the federal courts and the courts from all provinces and territories.

The court can also hear reference questions; requests directly from the federal cabinet asking about a question of law, typically the constitutionality of a major issue before it is heard in a trial court. Reference questions asked by a provincial cabinet to a province's highest court can be appealed as of right to the Supreme Court. Opinions given by the Supreme Court in answer to a reference question are not legally binding, but no government has ever ignored the opinion.

The Court is composed of the Chief Justice of Canada and eight puisne justices. Three of the nine justices are required to come from the Bar or superior courts of Quebec, to ensure the Court has a strong membership in the civil law of Quebec. The remaining six justices come from the rest of Canada, traditionally three from Ontario, two from the western provinces, and one from the Atlantic provinces. The Court is institutionally bilingual. Parties can argue their cases in either English or French, and file written materials in either language. The Court will provide simultaneous interpretation for counsel and members of the public. It issues its judgments in both languages simultaneously.

Although created in 1875, the Supreme Court was not originally the final court of appeal. Canada was part of the British Empire, and appeals initially lay to the Judicial Committee of the Privy Council from the Supreme Court, and also from the provincial appellate courts, bypassing the Supreme Court. In 1933, the federal Parliament abolished such appeals in criminal matters. It was not until 1949 that all appeals to the Judicial Committee were abolished, although appeals which were pending could be decided by the Judicial Committee.

=== Philippines ===
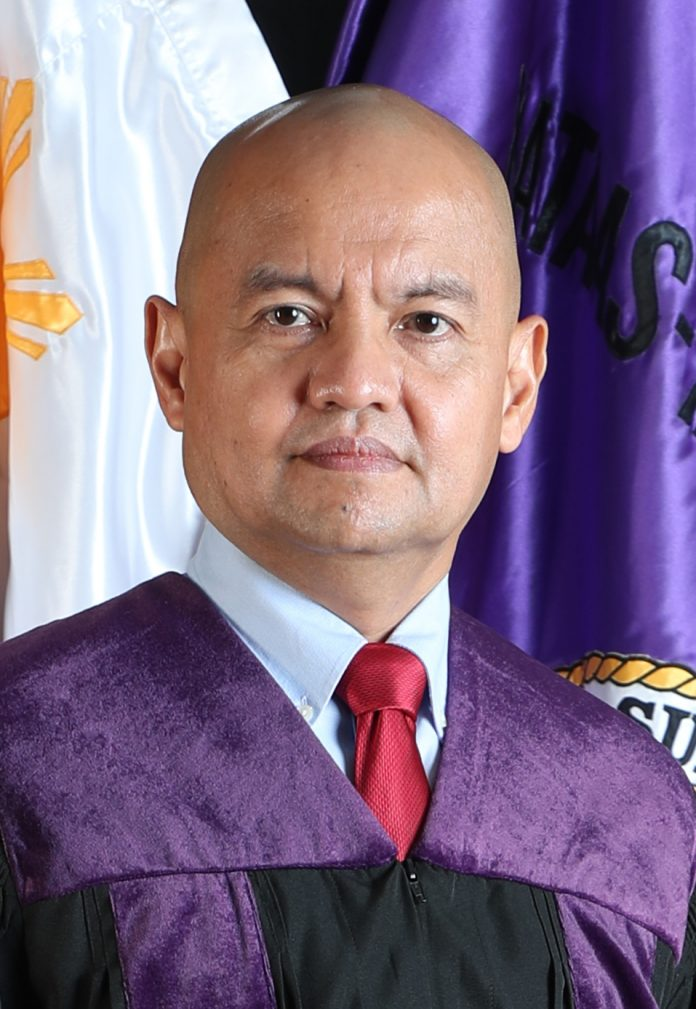
Senior Justice of the Supreme Court of the Philippines Marvic Leonen

The Philippines is generally considered the largest state with a hybrid civil law-common law system, and the Supreme Court is heavily modeled after the American Supreme Court. This can be attributed to the fact that the Philippines was colonized by both Spain and the United States, and the system of laws of both nations strongly influenced the development of Philippine laws and jurisprudence. Even as the body of Philippine laws remain mostly codified, the Philippine Civil Code expressly recognizes that decisions of the Supreme Court "form part of the law of the land", belonging to the same class as statutes. The 1987 Philippine Constitution also explicitly grants to the Supreme Court the power of judicial review over laws and executive actions. The Supreme Court is composed of 1 Chief Justice and 14 Associate Justices. The court sits either en banc or in divisions, depending on the nature of the case to be decided.

=== South Africa ===
In South Africa, a "two apex" system existed from 1994 to 2013. The Supreme Court of Appeal (SCA) was created in 1994 and replaced the Appellate Division of the Supreme Court of South Africa as the highest court of appeal in non-constitutional matters. The SCA was subordinate to the Constitutional Court, which is the highest court in matters involving the interpretation and application of the Constitution. But in August 2013 the Constitution was amended to make the Constitutional Court the country's single apex court, superior to the SCA in all matters, both constitutional and non-constitutional.

== Communist state jurisdictions ==
In communist states, the supreme state organ of power (SSOP), as the sole repository of unified state power, holds ultimate judicial and interpretive authority alongside its permanent organ. It delegates adjudication powers to a specialized organ known as the supreme judicial organ. However, the SJO remains structurally and politically subservient to the SSOP, which retains the power to issue binding legal interpretations and overrule judicial practice.

=== People's Republic of China ===
In the judicial system of mainland China the highest court of appeal is the Supreme People's Court. This supervises the administration of justice by all subordinate "local" and "special" people's courts, and is the court of last resort for the whole People's Republic of China, except for Macau and Hong Kong.

The final power to interpret the law is vested in the Standing Committee, the permanent organ of the National People's Congress. This power includes the power to interpret the basic laws of Hong Kong and Macau, the constitutional documents of the two special administrative regions which are British-based common law and Portuguese-based civil law jurisdictions respectively. This power is a legislative power and not a judicial one in that an interpretation by the NPCSC does not affect cases which have already been decided.

=== Socialist Republic of Vietnam ===
The apex of the judicial system of Vietnam is made up of two institutions, the Supreme People's Court of Vietnam (Vietnamese: Tòa án nhân dân tối cao) and the Supreme People's Procuracy of Vietnam (Vietnamese: Viện kiểm sát nhân dân tối cao). The Supreme People's Court is responsible for providing leadership to the Vietnamese court system, supervising the judicial process, and recommending bills to the National Assembly as appropriate under law. It is a court of final resort. The Supreme People's Procuracy has functions such as acting as the prosecutor before the People's Courts. The Supreme People's Procuracy has local and military subdivisions that include the district, provincial, and city levels. Both are accountable to the President of Vietnam, the highest institution of government power in the country. The head of the Supreme People's Court of Vietnam is the Chief Justice, with the Council of Justices (Hội đồng Thẩm phán) being made up of the Chief Justice and 16 other judges.

== Islamic law jurisdictions ==
- Supreme Judicial Council of Saudi Arabia

== See also ==
- Constitutionalism
- Separation of powers
- Judiciary
- Independence of the judiciary
- List of national supreme courts
- Lists of supreme court justices
