= Joint Senate of the Supreme Courts of the Federation =

The Joint Senate of the Supreme Courts of the Federation (Gemeinsamer Senat der Obersten Gerichtshöfe des Bundes (GmS-OGB), also called the Joint Senate) is an institution established to ensure the uniformity of the case law of the Federal Supreme Courts of the Federal Republic of Germany. The legal basis for its establishment is Article 95 (3) of the Basic Law in the version based on the Sixteenth Act Amending the Basic Law of 22 June 1968. Prior to this amendment, Article 95 of the Basic Law had provided for the establishment of a Supreme Federal Court, but this never came about.

The Joint Senate is composed of the Presidents of the Federal Court of Justice, the Federal Administrative Court, the Federal Labour Court, the Federal Social Court and the Federal Fiscal Court, who are supplemented, depending on the case, by the chairmen and one other judge from each of the Senates involved. The Joint Senate gathers rarely (between 2000 and 2010, there were only three decisions), as the areas of responsibility of the branches of justice in Germany are in general well-defined and so most of its rulings are on definitory matters. Its meetings are organised by the Federal Court of Justice in Karlsruhe.

The Joint Senate (Gemeinsamer Senat) should not be confused with the Grand Senate (Großer Senat) that exists within each Federal Supreme Court. Its function is similar to that of the Joint Senate, as it mediates between the several Senates of a Supreme Court in cases of dissent.

== See also ==
- Federal courts (Germany)
