= Bundesgericht =

Bundesgericht may refer to:

- Federal Supreme Court of Switzerland
- Federal courts (Germany)
