= Iris Ebling =

German federal court judge

President of the Federal Fiscal Court
- In office 5 November 1999 – 31 May 2005
- Preceded by: Klaus Offerhaus
- Succeeded by: Wolfgang Spindler

Personal details
- Born: 9 May 1940 (age 85)

Iris Ebling (born 9 May 1940 in Berlin) was a German lawyer who served from 1999 to 2005 as President of the Federal Fiscal Court.

Ebling was the first woman to become President of one of the highest federal courts. In 1974, she was appointed a judge at the Munich Fiscal Court and in 1984 she was elected judge at the Federal Fiscal Court.

Ebling retired at the end of May 2005.
