= Hans Müller (politician) =

German jurist, administrator and politician (1884–1961)

President of the Federal Fiscal Court
- In office 1 May 1951 – 31 December 1954
- Preceded by: Heinrich Schmittmann
- Succeeded by: Ludwig Heßdörfer

Personal details
- Born: 25 June 1884
- Died: 19 April 1961 (aged 76)

Hans Müller (25 June 1884 in Trier – 19 April 1961 in München) was a German jurist, an administrator and politician, a member of the Freikorps and of the Nazi Party. He was also a member of the CSU.

Müller studied law and economy in Bonn, Freiburg im Breisgau and Munich, and was promoted in 1910 to Dr. jur. et rer. pol.

Müller served since 1911 at the Fiscal Courts in Mülheim an der Ruhr and Düsseldorf, was President of the Oberfinanzdirektion in Karlsruhe from 1927 to 1933 and judge at the Reichsfinanzhof from 1933 to 1945.

After the Second World War, Müller joined the CSU, serving from 1946 to 1950 in the Landesvorstand and in the Ministry of Agriculture of Bavaria. From 22 October 1945 to 18 December 1950 he served as Staatsrat and state secretary in the Bavarian State Ministry of Finances under Minister-Presidents Wilhelm Hoegner and Hans Ehard.

After that, he continued his pre-war career, serving from 1 May 1951 to 31 December 1954 as President of the Federal Fiscal Court.
