= Rudolf Mellinghoff =

German judge, jurisprudent and tax law expert

President of the Federal Fiscal Court
- In office 31 October 2011 – 31 July 2020
- Preceded by: Wolfgang Spindler
- Succeeded by: Hans-Josef Thesling

Justice of the Federal Constitutional Court of Germany
- In office 23 January 2001 – 31 October 2011

Personal details
- Born: 25 November 1954 (age 71)

Rudolf Mellinghoff (born 25 November 1954) is a German judge, jurisprudent and tax law expert who served as President of the Federal Fiscal Court from 2011 to 2020. He was also a justice of the Federal Constitutional Court serving in the court's second senate (2001–2011).

== Career ==
Prior to his appointment to the Federal Constitutional Court, he served as judge at the Federal Fiscal Court from 1997 to 2001. He left the Federal Constitutional Court prematurely to return to the Federal Fiscal Court as its President.

In 2022, Mellinghoff was appointed to the Commission for the Reform of the Electoral Law and the Modernization of Parliamentary Work, co-chaired by Johannes Fechner and Nina Warken.

== Other activities ==
- Max Planck Institute for Tax Law and Public Finance, Member of the Board of Trustees
- International Fiscal Association (IFA), Member of the Permanent Scientific Committee (since 2017)
- Judicial Integrity Group, Member (since 2010)

== Recognition ==
- 2006 – Honorary doctorate, University of Greifswald
- 2011 – Order of Merit of the Federal Republic of Germany

== See also ==
- Federal Constitutional Court
- Federal Fiscal Court
