= Richterwahlausschuss =

Bodies in the German judicial system

Richterwahlausschuss (Committee for the Election of Judges) is the name of bodies in the German judicial system that elect the judges of the ordinary courts (ordentliche Gerichte) and the special courts (besondere Gerichte) on the federal level (Bundesebene) and in some cases also on the level of the states (Landesebene).

== Federal level ==
On the federal level the Richterwahlausschuss elects the federal judges (Bundesrichter) to the federal courts (Bundesgericht), like e.g. the federal tribunal (Bundesgerichtshof - BGH), the federal labor court (Bundesarbeitsgericht - BAG), the federal administrative court (Bundesverwaltungsgericht - BVerwG), the federal tax court (Bundesfinanzhof - BFH), the federal social court (Bundessozialgericht - BSG), and the federal patent court (Bundespatentgericht - BPatG). The source of law for the federal Richterwahlausschuss is Art. 95 Sec. 2 of the German Constitution (Grundgesetz - GG), The Act on Electing Judges (Richterwahlgesetz - RiWG), and The Act on Judges (Deutsches Richtergesetz - DRiG). Members of the Richterwahlausschluss are the sixteen ministers of justice of the German states (in some states called senators) and sixteen further members which are chosen by the lower house of the German parliament (Bundestag - BT). Members of the Richterwahlausschuss do not have to be judges themselves, and usually they are not.

Judges of the Federal Constitutional Tribunal (Bundesverfassungsgericht BVerfG) are elected according to Art. 94 of the German Constitution (Grundgesetz - GG) by the federal parliament without the involvement of the Richterwahlausschuss.

=== Procedure of electing judges ===
Candidates for the federal judges are chosen by the federal minister of justice (Bundesjustizminister) or the Richterwahlausschuss. Non-binding opinions of the candidates are issued by the governing body of the court, in which the candidate is supposed to work, vide § 57 DRiG. The federal minister of justice then sends the file of the candidate to the Richterwahlausschuss. The Richterwahlausschuss makes the decision in a secret ballot with a simple majority of the votes cast. If the federal minister of justice approves the chosen candidate, (s)he applies to the federal president (Bundespräsident) to appoint the chosen candidate as a judge. The federal president together with the federal chancellor (Bundeskanzler) or the federal minister of justice appoints the judge.

== State level ==
In five states the election and appointment of judges is taking place only within the state ministries of justice without the involvement of a Richterwahlausschuss.

- According to Art. 51 Sec. 3 of the Constitution of Lower Saxony a Richterwahlausschuss may be installed. It has not been installed so far.
- According to Art. 79 Sec. 3 of the Constitution of Saxony a Richterwahlausschuss may be installed. It has not been installed so far.
- According to Art. 83 Sec. 4 of the Constitution of Saxony-Anhalt a Richterwahlausschuss may be installed.
- North Rhine-Westphalia and Saarland do not have a Richterwahlausschuss.

Eleven states do have a Richterwahlausschuss. Its capacity is different in every state:

=== Baden-Württemberg ===
The election and appointment of judges is taking place only within the state ministry of justice without the involvement of a Richterwahlausschuss. However, if the governing body of the court in question rejects the chosen candidate, a Richterwahlausschuss is appointed to solve the conflict.

=== Bavaria ===
The election and appointment of judges is taking place only within the state ministry of justice without the involvement of a Richterwahlausschuss. There is a Richter-Wahl-Kommission which only elects the judges to the Bavarian Constitutional Tribunal (Bayerischen Verfassungsgerichtshofes - BayVerfGH). Members of the Richter-Wahl-Kommission are the speaker of the Bavarian parliament and nine of its members.

=== Berlin ===
Richterwahlausschuss has 14 members of which eight are chosen by the Berlin parliament.

=== Brandenburg ===
Richterwahlausschuss has 12 members of which eight are chosen by the Brandenburg parliament.

=== Bremen ===
Richterwahlausschuss has 11 members of which five are chosen by the Bremen parliament.

=== Hamburg ===
Richterwahlausschuss has 14 members of which nine are members of the Hamburg parliament, vide Art. 63 of the Constitution of Hamburg.

=== Hesse ===
Richterwahlausschuss has 13 members of which seven are members of the Hessian parliament, vide Art. 127 Sec. 3 of the Constitution of Hesse.

=== Mecklenburg-West Pomerania ===
There is a Richterwahlausschuss, vide Art. 76 Sec. 3 of the Constitution of Hamburg.

=== Rhineland-Palatinate ===
Richterwahlausschuss has 11 members of which eight are members of the Rhineland-Palatinate parliament, vide Art. 102 of the Constitution of Rhineland-Palatinate.

=== Schleswig-Holstein ===
There is a Richterwahlausschuss with 2/3 of its members being members of the Schleswig-Holstein parliament, vide Art. 43 of the Constitution of Schleswig-Holstein.

=== Thuringia ===
Richterwahlausschuss has 12 members of which eight are members of the Thuringian parliament, Art. 89 Sec. 2 of the Constitution of Thuringia.

== Legitimation chain theory ==
According to the understanding of democracy in the German legal doctrine (Demokratieprinzip), every government authority, also the judiciary, has to be traced back to the people by an uninterrupted chain of democratic legitimation (demokratische Legitimationskette). In accordance with this doctrine judges need to be appointed either directly by the people or by a representative of the people chosen in an election, e.g. by the parliament, the minister appointed by the parliament, a person appointed by the minister. The bigger the amount of chain links between the election by the people and the election of the judge, the weaker is the democratic legitimation.

== Sources ==
- German Constitution (Grundgesetz - GG)
- Act on the Elections of Judges (Richterwahlgesetz - RiWG)
- Act on Judges (Deutsches Richtergesetz - DRiG)
- Election of the judges of the federal constitutional tribunal (PDF, 16 kB)
- Constitution of Baden-Württemberg
- Constitution of Bavaria
- Constitution of Berlin
- Constitution of Brandenburg
- Constitution of Bremen
- Constitution of Hamburg
- Constitution of Hesse
- Constitution of Mecklenburg-West Pomerania
- Constitution of Rhineland-Palatinate
- Constitution of Schleswig-Holstein
- Constitution of Thuringia
- Ernst-Wolfgang Böckenförde: Demokratie als Verfassungsprinzip (§ 24), insbes. Rn 11–25, in: Josef Isensee/Paul Kirchhof (Hrsg.): Handbuch des Staatsrechts der Bundesrepublik Deutschland, Bd. II, 3. Auflage, Heidelberg 2004.
