= Amtsgericht =

First instance ordinary court in Germany

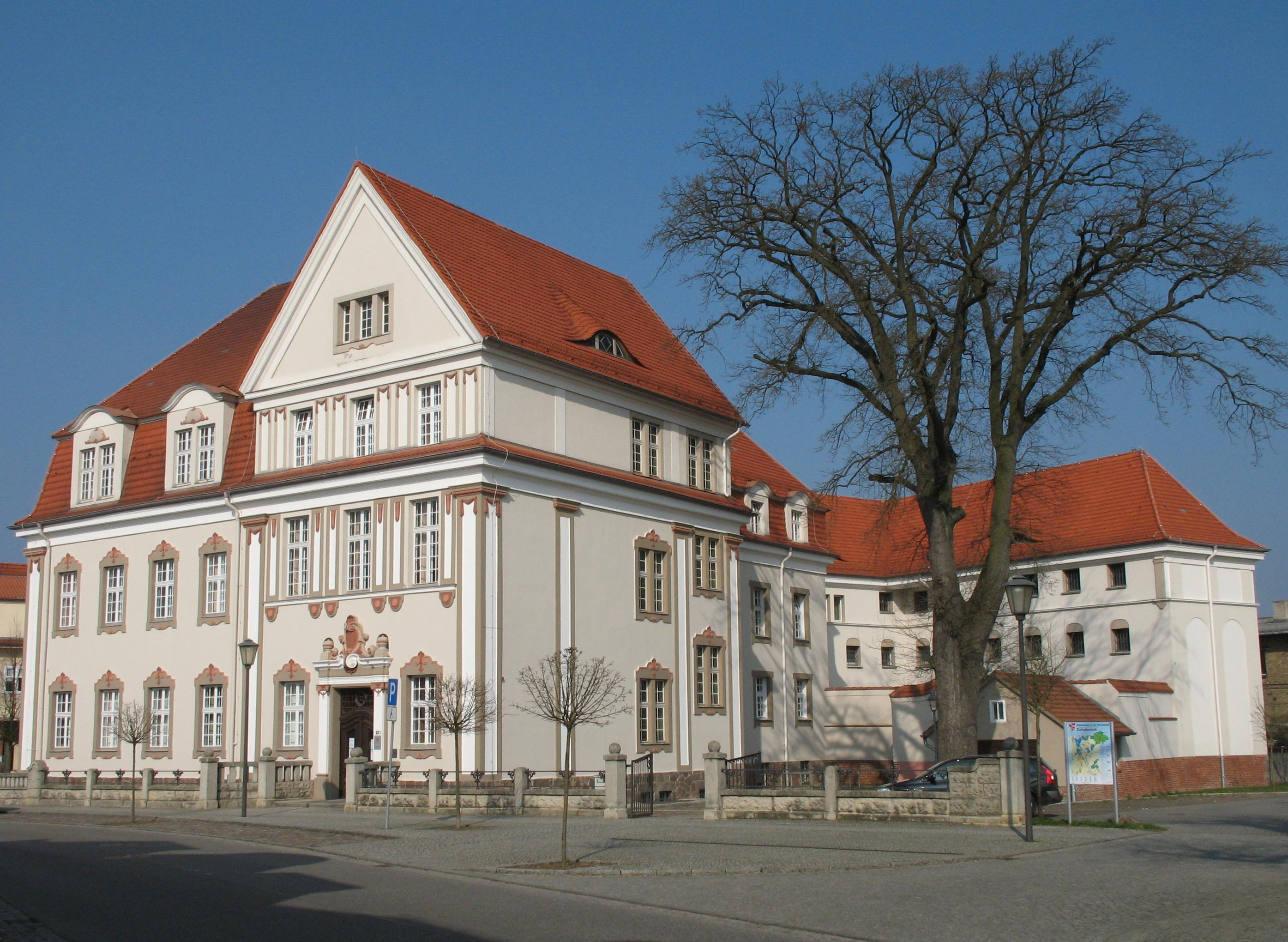
The Amtsgericht in Zehdenick

An Amtsgericht (Local Court) in Germany is an official court. These courts form the lowest level of the so-called 'ordinary jurisdiction' of the German judiciary (German Ordentliche Gerichtsbarkeit), which is responsible for most criminal and civil judicial matters. The German Amtsgericht may be compared to the magistrates' courts in England and Wales, although it has much broader sentencing powers. Its name derives from the Amt as a denomination for an administrative and court district in many of the territories of the Holy Roman Empire.

The main areas of an Amtsgericht's jurisdiction are:

- court of first instance for civil cases where the subject of litigation is worth €10,000 or less, and for litigation involving rental agreements, marriages, alimony and child custody.
- court of first instance for criminal cases where no more than four years imprisonment is expected. Several exceptions exist, such as all homicide.
- administration of several public registers such as the companies', the associations', the cooperatives' and the land ownership register.

In criminal cases, the court may be composed of either one professional judge, where the expected sentence is not more than two years imprisonment, or 1-2 professional judges and 2 lay judges where the expected sentence is more than two years imprisonment. A single judge is still able to impose up to four years imprisonment.

There are 640 Amtsgerichte in Germany, whose jurisdictional area typically comprises a small number of towns or municipalities. The next higher level of ordinary jurisdiction is called the Landgericht. The term Amtsgericht may also refer to the building where the proceedings take place.
