= Supreme Judicial Court =

Supreme Judicial Court may refer to:

- Maine Supreme Judicial Court
- Massachusetts Supreme Judicial Court
- Rhode Island Supreme Court, formerly the Supreme Judicial Court

== See also ==
- Supreme Court of the United States
- State supreme courts
