= Federal courts (Germany) =

In Germany, federal courts (German: Bundesgerichte pronounced [ˈbʊndəsɡəˌʁɪçtə], singular Bundesgericht) are courts which are established by federal law. According to article 92 of the Basic Law for the Federal Republic of Germany, the judiciary power is exercised by the Federal Constitutional Court, the federal courts provided for in the Basic Law, and the courts of the Länder (Landesgerichte).

The federal courts are:

- Supreme courts, mandated by article 95 of the Basic Law
  - Federal Court of Justice (supreme court of ordinary jurisdiction)
  - Federal Administrative Court (supreme court of administrative jurisdiction)
  - Federal Fiscal Court (supreme court of financial jurisdiction)
  - Federal Labour Court (supreme court of labour jurisdiction)
  - Federal Social Court (supreme court of social jurisdiction)
- Other courts, created under article 96 of the Basic Law
  - Federal Patent Court, a court of ordinary jurisdiction
  - Truppendienstgericht Nord and Truppendienstgericht Süd, courts of administrative jurisdiction for disciplinary proceedings against members of the Bundeswehr

It is also possible to establish military criminal courts (Wehrstrafgerichte) for exercising criminal jurisdiction during a state of defence or over members of the Bundeswehr serving abroad, however the federal legislature has so far not done so. A Federal Disciplinary Court (Bundesdisziplinargericht) for disciplinary proceedings against Beamte existed until 2004, but this matter has since been transferred to the ordinary administrative courts.

The initial version of the Basic Law had provided for a Supreme Federal Court (Oberstes Bundesgericht) to be established, superior to the five highest courts for the different branches of jurisdiction. Such a court was never established; in 1968 the Basic Law was changed to establish the Joint Senate of the Supreme Courts of the Federation instead.

Furthermore, pursuant to article 96 section 5 of the Basic Law, federal law can provide for courts of the Länder to exercise the Federation's criminal jurisdiction concerning the protection of the state, crimes of war and crimes against humanity. This is currently implemented by making Oberlandesgerichte the first instance for such cases, with appeals being to the Federal Court of Justice.
