= Federal Social Court =

German federal supreme court of social jurisdiction

Coordinates: 51.31442°N 9.44941°E

Federal Social Court (BSG)
- German: Bundessozialgericht

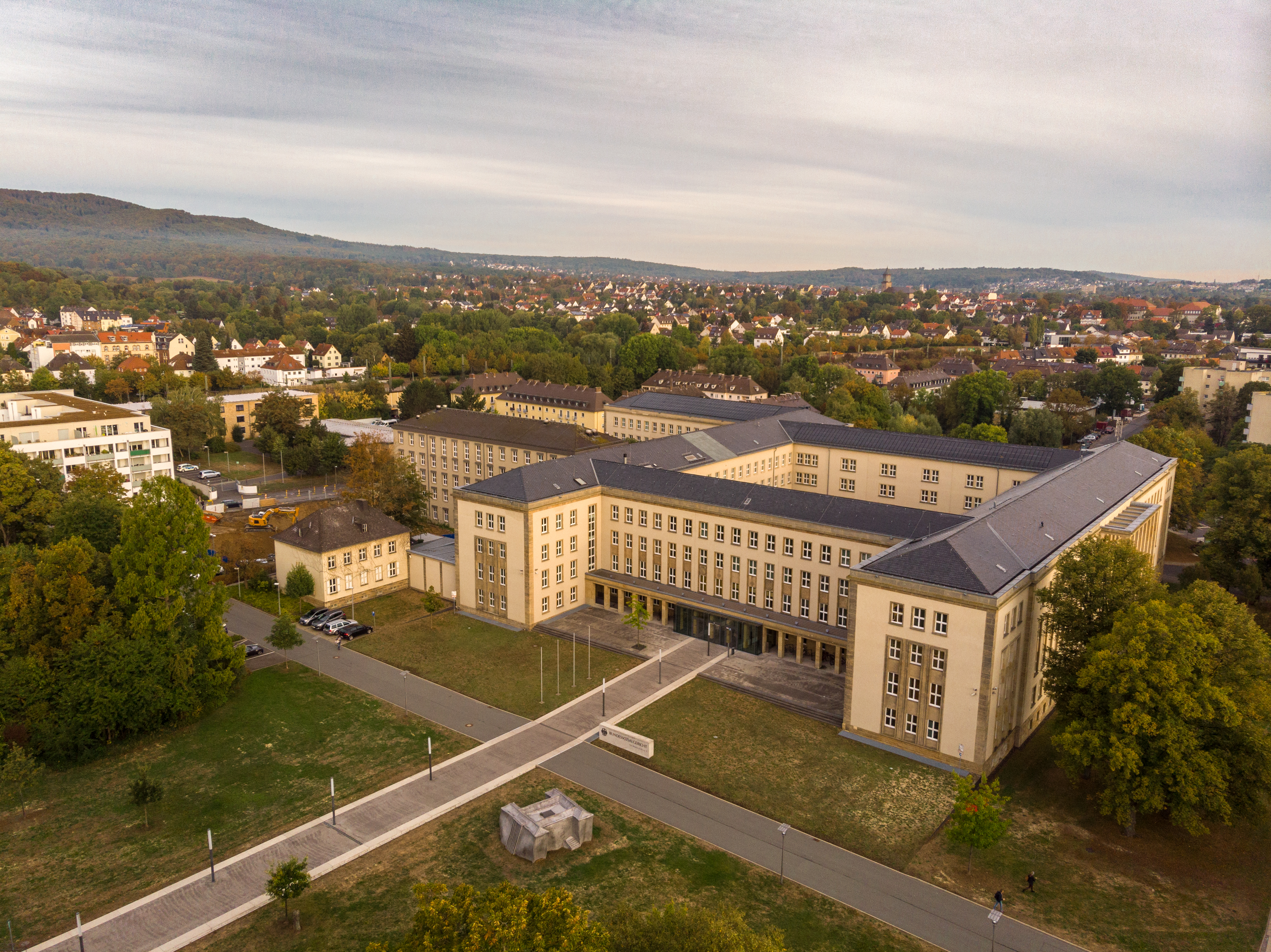
- Federal Social Court in Kassel
- Established: 1954; 72 years ago
- Jurisdiction: Germany
- Location: Kassel, Germany
- Composition method: Elected by Committee for the Election of Judges
- Authorised by: Basic Law for the Federal Republic of Germany
- Website: www.bsg.bund.de/EN

President of the Federal Social Court
- Currently: Christine Fuchsloch
- Since: 1 March 2024

Vice President of the Federal Social Court
- Currently: Andreas Heinz
- Since: 24 August 2023

The Federal Social Court (German: Bundessozialgericht, pronounced [bʊndəszoˈtsi̯aːlɡəˌʁɪçt]; abbreviated BSG) is the highest federal court in Germany for social security cases, primarily those concerning the public health insurance, long-term care insurance, pension insurance and occupational accident insurance schemes. Trial courts for these cases are the Sozialgerichte (Social Courts). Appeals against decisions of these courts are heard by the Landessozialgerichte (Higher Social Courts), before the cases may wind up at the Bundessozialgericht.

The Bundessozialgericht is located in the city of Kassel.

== History ==
The Federal Social Court was founded on 11 September 1954 and its first session was on 23 March 1955.

== Function ==
The Federal Social court hears appeals against decisions of the Landessozialgerichte (Higher Social Courts) or in special circumstances against decisions of the Sozialgerichte (Social Courts).

== Organisation ==
The Chambers of the Federal Social Court are called Senat. They each consist of 3 Judges and 2 lay judges. The court consists of 14 Chambers.

- 1. Senat: public health insurance
- 2. Senat: occupational accident insurance
- 3. Senat: public health insurance, long-term care insurance, social insurance for artists
- 4. Senat: basic needs coverage for people looking for employment
- 5. Senat: statutory pension insurance
- 6. Senat: contracts with dentists and doctors
- 7. Senat: benefits for asylum seekers
- 8. Senat: social assistance (Sozialhilfe)
- 9. Senat: damages, disability, help for blind people
- 10. Senat: pensions for farmers, benefits regarding child care, legal protection against artificially long trials
- 11. Senat: unemployment benefits, and other matters involving the Bundesagentur für Arbeit
- 12. Senat: insurance membership and payments
- 13. Senat: statutory pension insurance
- 14. Senat: basic needs for people looking for employment, §6a and §6b Kindergeldgesetz
