= Fiscal Court (Germany) =

German court with fiscal jurisdiction

The Fiscal Court (German: Finanzgericht, abbreviated FG) is a specialised German court with fiscal jurisdiction. Under German law, the Fiscal Court is the court of first instance for legal action in fiscal disputes. The Fiscal Court rules on legal disputes between citizens and tax authorities (tax offices, customs authorities, family funds [Familienkassen] and the Deutsche Rentenversicherung Bund in matters relating to pension benefits [Section 98 German Income Tax Act]).

The punishment of tax offenders is not one of the responsibilities of the Fiscal Courts. The Fiscal Courts are not an extended arm of the tax administration, but are legally independent like any other German court.

The structure of the German courts with fiscal jurisdiction is two-tiered. The appeals against decisions by the Fiscal Courts is heard by the Federal Fiscal Court.

== List of the Fiscal Courts ==
Germany has 18 Fiscal Courts and one Federal Fiscal Court. Every German state (Bundesland) has one Fiscal Court except Berlin and Brandenburg, which have a shared Fiscal Court, Bavaria, which has two Fiscal Courts (in Munich and Nuremberg) and North Rhine-Westphalia, which has three Fiscal Courts (Düsseldorf, Cologne and Münster).

State	Courts	Ref.
Baden-Württemberg	Fiscal Court Baden-Württemberg (in Stuttgart)	
Bavaria	Fiscal Court Munich (with external senates in Augsburg); Finance Court Nuremberg	
Berlin und Brandenburg	Fiscal Court of the Länder Berlin-Brandenburg (in Cottbus)	
Bremen	Fiscal Court Bremen	
Hamburg	Fiscal Court Hamburg	
Hesse	Fiscal Court Hesse (in Kassel)	
Mecklenburg-Vorpommern	Fiscal Court Mecklenburg-Vorpommern (in Greifswald)	
Lower Saxony	Fiscal Court Lower Saxony (in Hanover)	
North Rhine-Westphalia	Fiscal Court Düsseldorf; Fiscal Court Cologne; Fiscal Court Münster	
Rhineland-Palatinate	Fiscal Court Rhineland-Palatinate (in Neustadt an der Weinstraße)	
Saarland	Fiscal Court of the Saarland (in Saarbrücken)	
Saxony	Fiscal Court Saxony (in Leipzig)	
Saxony-Anhalt	Fiscal Court of the State of Saxony-Anhalt (in Dessau-Roßlau)	
Schleswig-Holstein	Fiscal Court Saxony (in Kiel)	
Thuringia	Fiscal Court Thuringia (in Gotha)	

== Bibliography ==
- Schaumburg, Heide; Hendricks, Michael, eds. (2018). Steuerrechtsschutz (in German) (4 ed.). Otto Schmidt. ISBN 9783504165673.
