= Politics of Schleswig-Holstein =

- Country: Germany

Legislative branch
- Legislature: Schleswig-Holsteinischer Landtag
- Speaker: Kristina Herbst, CDU
- Meeting place: Kiel

Executive branch
- Minister-President: Daniel Günther
- 1. Deputy Minister-President: Aminata Toure

Judicial branch
- Schleswig-Holsteinisches Landesverfassungsgericht
- President: Christoph Brüning

The politics of Schleswig-Holstein takes place within a framework of a federal parliamentary representative democratic republic, where the Federal Government of Germany exercises sovereign rights with certain powers reserved to the states of Germany including Schleswig-Holstein. The state has a multi-party system.

== History ==
From 1919 to 1928, the largest parties in Schleswig-Holstein were the Social Democratic Party, German Democratic Party, Conservative Party and German Peoples Party. From 1930 onwards, Schleswig-Holstein was a bastion of Nazi support. In the 1930 Reicshtag elections, the Nazi Party received their highest vote share in Schleswig-Holstein with 27%. In 1932, the Nazi Party won 51% of the vote in Schleswig-Holstein, the only district where Nazis received an absolute majority. The rural areas of Schleswig-Holstein were particularly likely to support the Nazis.

== Executive branch ==
=== Minister-presidents since 1949 ===
Since the creation of the Federal Republic in 1945, the state's minister-presidents have been:

Period	Minister-President	Party
1945–1947	Theodor Steltzer	(CDU)
1947–1949	Hermann Lüdemann	(SPD)
1949–1950	Bruno Diekmann	(SPD)
1950–1951	Walter Bartram	(CDU)
1951–1954	Friedrich-Wilhelm Lübke	(CDU)
1954–1963	Kai-Uwe von Hassel	(CDU)
1963–1971	Helmut Lemke	(CDU)
1971–1982	Gerhard Stoltenberg	(CDU)
1982–1987	Uwe Barschel	(CDU)
1987–1988	Henning Schwarz	(CDU)
1988–1993	Björn Engholm	(SPD)
1993–2005	Heide Simonis	(SPD)
2005–2012	Peter Harry Carstensen	(CDU)
2012– 2016	Torsten Albig	(SPD)
2017–	Daniel Günther	(CDU)

=== Current cabinet ===
Portfolio	Minister	Party	Took office	Left office	State secretaries
Minister-President	Daniel Günther born 24 July 1973 (age 53)	CDU	29 June 2022	Incumbent	
Deputy Minister-President	Aminata Touré born 15 November 1992 (age 33)	GRÜNE	1 August 2024	Incumbent	
Minister for Social Affairs, Youth, Family, Seniors, Integration and Equality	Aminata Touré born 15 November 1992 (age 33)	GRÜNE	29 June 2022	Incumbent	Johannes Albig
Deputy Minister-President Minister for Finance	Monika Heinold born 30 December 1958 (age 67)	GRÜNE	29 June 2022	1 August 2024	Silke Torp; Oliver Rabe
Minister for Finance	Silke Schneider born 2 September 1967 (age 59)	GRÜNE	1 August 2024	Incumbent	Silke Torp; Oliver Rabe
Minister for Justice and Health	Kerstin von der Decken born 22 November 1968 (age 57)	CDU	29 June 2022	Incumbent	Otto Carstens; Oliver Grundei
Minister for Education, Training, Science, Research and Culture	Karin Prien born 26 June 1965 (age 61)	CDU	29 June 2022	Incumbent	Dorit Stenke; Guido Wendt
Minister for Interior, Communities, Housing and Sport	Sabine Sütterlin-Waack born 15 February 1958 (age 68)	CDU	29 June 2022	Incumbent	Jörg Sibbel; Magdalena Finke
Minister for Energy Transition, Climate Protection, Environment and Nature	Tobias Goldschmidt born 16 September 1981 (age 44)	GRÜNE	29 June 2022	Incumbent	Katja Günther; Joschka Knuth
Minister for Economics, Transport, Labour, Technology and Tourism	Claus Ruhe Madsen born 27 August 1972 (age 54)	CDU(Independent until May 2023, CDU nomination)	29 June 2022	Incumbent	Tobias von der Heide; Julia Carstens
Minister for Agriculture, Rural Areas, Europe and Consumer Protection	Werner Schwarz born 10 April 1960 (age 66)	CDU	29 June 2022	Incumbent	Anne Benett-Sturies
Chief of the State Chancellery	Dirk Schrödter born 17 October 1978 (age 47)	CDU	29 June 2022	Incumbent	Johannes Callsen; Sandra Gerken

== Legislative branch ==
The last elections were held on 8 May 2022.

=== Election results by vote percentage since 1949 ===
Year	CDU	Green	SPD	FDP	SSW	AfD	BHE
1947^{4}	34,1	-	43,8	5,0	9,3	-	
1950^{5}	19,8	-	27,5	7,1	5,5	-	23,4
1954^{6}	32,2	-	33,2	7,5	3,5	-	14,0
1958^{7}	44,4	-	35,9	5,4	2,8	-	6,9
1962	45,0	-	39,2	7,9	2,3	-	4,2
1967^{8}	46,0	-	39,4	5,9	1,9	-	-
1971	51,9	-	41,0	3,8	1,4	-	-
1975	50,4	-	40,1	7,1	1,4	-	-
1979	48,3	2,4	41,7	5,7	1,4	-	-
1983	49,0	3,6	43,7	2,2	1,3	-	-
1987	42,6	3,9	45,2	5,2	1,5	-	-
1988	33,3	2,9	54,8	4,4	1,7	-	-
1992^{9}	33,8	5,0	46,2	5,6	1,9	-	-
1996^{10}	37,2	8,1	39,8	5,7	2,5	-	-
2000	35,2	6,2	43,1	7,6	4,1	-	-
2005	40,2	6,2	38,7	6,6	3,6	-	-
2009	31,5	12,4	25,4	14,9	4,3	-	-
2012	30,8	13,2	30,4	8,2	4,6	-	-
2017	32,0	12,9	27,3	11,5	3,3	5,9	-
2022	43,4	18,3	16,0	6,4	5,7	4,4	-

=== Election results by seat distribution since 1947 ===
Distribution of Seats in the 20th Schleswig-Holstein Landtag

Year	Total	CDU	Bündnis 90/ Die Grünen	SPD	FDP	SSW	AfD	BHE
1947	70	21	-	43		6	-	
1950	69	16	-	19	8	4	-	15
1954	69	25	-	25	5	-	-	10
1958	69	33	-	26	3	2	-	5
1962	69	34	-	29	5	1	-	-
1967	73	34	-	30	4	1	-	-
1971	73	40	-	32	-	1	-	-
1975	73	37	-	30	5	1	-	-
1979	73	37	-	31	4	1	-	-
1983	74	39	-	34	-	1	-	-
1987	74	33	-	36	4	1	-	-
1988	74	27	-	46	-	1	-	-
1992	89	32	-	45	5	1	-	-
1996	75	30	6	33	4	2	-	-
2000	89	33	5	41	7	3	-	-
2005	69	30	4	29	4	2	-	-
2009	95	34	12	25	14	4	-	-
2012	69		10	22	6	3	-	-
2017	73	25	10	21	9	3	5	-
2022	69	34	14	12	5	4	-	-

1st Landtag, following 1947 election

2nd Landtag, following 1950 election

3rd Landtag, following 1954 election

4th Landtag, following 1958 election

5th Landtag, following 1962 election

6th Landtag, following 1967 election

7th Landtag, following 1971 election

8th Landtag, following 1975 election

9th Landtag, following 1979 election

10th Landtag, following 1983 election

11th Landtag, following 1987 election

12th Landtag, following 1988 election

13th Landtag, following 1992 election

14th Landtag, following 1996 election

15th Landtag, following 2000 election

16th Landtag, following 2005 election

17th Landtag, following 2009 election

18th Landtag, following 2013 election

19th Landtag, following 2017 election

20th Landtag, following 2022 election

=== Constituencies in the Landtag ===
- Nordfriesland-Nord (01)
- Nordfriesland-Süd (02)
- Flensburg (03)
- Flensburg-Land (04)
- Schleswig (05)
- Dithmarschen-Schleswig (06)
- Dithmarschen-Süd (07)
- Echernförde (08)
- Rendsburg-Ost (09)
- Rendsburg (10)
- Neumünster (11)
- Kiel-Nord (12)
- Kiel-West (13)
- Kiel-Ost (14)
- Plön-Nord (15)
- Plön-Ostholstein (16)
- Ostholstein-Nord (17)
- Ostholstein-Süd (18)
- Steinburg-West (19)
- Steinburg-Ost (20)
- Elmshorn (21)
- Pinneberg-Nord (22)
- Pinneberg-Elbmarschen (23)
- Pinneberg (24)
- Segeberg-West (25)
- Segeberg-Ost (26)
- Norderstedt (27)
- Stormarn-Nord (28)
- Stormarn-Mitte (29)
- Stormarn-Süd (30)
- Lübeck-Ost (31)
- Lübeck-West (32)
- Lübeck-Süd (33)
- Lauenburg-Nord (34)
- Lauenburg-Süd (35)

== Judicial branch ==
The Schleswig-Holstein Landesverfassungsgericht was formed in 2008. Until then, Schleswig-Holstein was the last German state without a constitutional court.
