= Second Günther cabinet =

State government of Schleswig-Holstein

Second Cabinet of Daniel Günther Cabinet Günther II
- 27th Cabinet of Schleswig-Holstein
- 29 June 2022 –
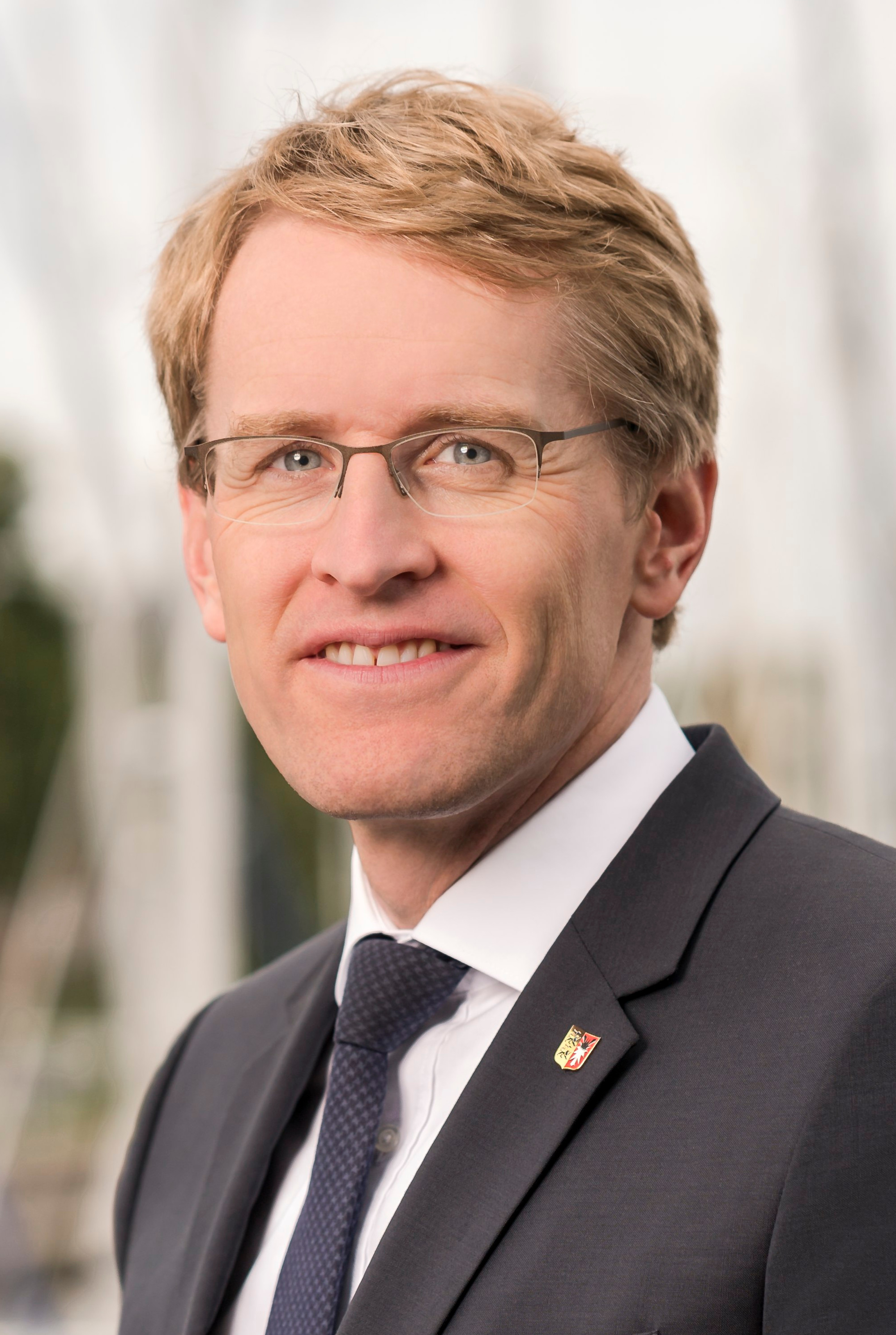
- Daniel Günther in July 2017
- Date formed: 29 June 2022

People and organisations
- Minister-President: Daniel Günther
- Deputy Minister-President: Monika Heinold (until August 2024); Aminata Touré (from August 2024)
- No. of ministers: 9
- Member parties: Christian Democratic Union; Alliance 90/The Greens
- Status in legislature: Coalition government (Majority)
- Opposition parties: Social Democratic Party; Free Democratic Party; South Schleswig Voters' Association

History
- Election: 2022 Schleswig-Holstein state election
- Legislature term: 20th Landtag of Schleswig-Holstein
- Predecessor: First Günther cabinet

The Second Günther cabinet is the current state government of Schleswig-Holstein, sworn in on 29 June 2022 after Daniel Günther was elected as Minister-President of Schleswig-Holstein by the members of the Landtag of Schleswig-Holstein. It is the 27th Cabinet of Schleswig-Holstein.

It was formed after the 2022 Schleswig-Holstein state election by the Christian Democratic Union (CDU) and Alliance 90/The Greens (GRÜNE). Excluding the Minister-President, the cabinet comprises nine ministers. Five are members of the CDU, three are members of the Greens, and one is an independent politician nominated by the CDU.

== Formation ==
The previous cabinet was a coalition government of the CDU, Greens, and Free Democratic Party (FDP) led by Minister-President Daniel Günther.

The election took place on 8 May 2022 and resulted in major increase in support for both the CDU and Greens, and a decline for the FDP. The opposition Social Democratic Party (SPD) also suffered major losses, while the South Schleswig Voters' Association (SSW) improved its performance and the AfD lost representation in the Landtag.

Overall, the incumbent coalition was returned with an increased majority; the CDU alone fell just one seat short of an absolute majority and could form a coalition with any one of the other parties. Minister-President Günther initially expressed his desire to renew the outgoing coalition, but both the Greens and FDP ruled this out on the basis that neither wished to join a government in which they were not mathematically needed. After holding separate talks with both parties, the CDU extended an invitation to the Greens for coalition talks on 23 May, which was accepted.

On 22 June, the CDU and Greens announced that they had finalised a coalition agreement. The contract was approved overwhelmingly by both parties' congresses on 27 June, with the Greens recording four dissenting votes and the CDU none.

Daniel Günther was re-elected as Minister-President by the Landtag on 29 June, winning 47 votes out of 66 cast, including four abstentions.

In June of 2024, Deputy Minister-President Monika Heinold announced her resignation. Her Party designated incumbent Minister for Social Affairs, Youth, Family, Seniors, Integration and Equality Aminata Touré as her successor. Silke Schneider was nominated her successor as Minister of Finance.

== Composition ==
Portfolio	Minister	Party	Took office	Left office	State secretaries
Minister-President	Daniel Günther born 24 July 1973 (age 53)	CDU	29 June 2022	Incumbent	
Deputy Minister-President	Aminata Touré born 15 November 1992 (age 34)	GRÜNE	1 August 2024	Incumbent	
Minister for Social Affairs, Youth, Family, Seniors, Integration and Equality	Aminata Touré born 15 November 1992 (age 34)	GRÜNE	29 June 2022	Incumbent	Johannes Albig
Deputy Minister-President Minister for Finance	Monika Heinold born 30 December 1958 (age 67)	GRÜNE	29 June 2022	1 August 2024	Silke Torp; Oliver Rabe
Minister for Finance	Silke Schneider born 2 September 1967 (age 59)	GRÜNE	1 August 2024	Incumbent	Silke Torp; Oliver Rabe
Minister for Justice and Health	Kerstin von der Decken born 22 November 1968 (age 57)	CDU	29 June 2022	Incumbent	Otto Carstens; Oliver Grundei
Minister for Education, Training, Science, Research and Culture	Karin Prien born 26 June 1965 (age 61)	CDU	29 June 2022	5 May 2025	Dorit Stenke; Guido Wendt
Minister for Education, Training, Science, Research and Culture	Dorit Stenke born 11 September 1960 (age 66)	CDU	6 May 2025	Incumbent	Tobias von der Heide; Guido Wendt
Minister for Interior, Communities, Housing and Sport	Sabine Sütterlin-Waack born 15 February 1958 (age 68)	CDU	29 June 2022	11 November 2025	Jörg Sibbel; Magdalena Finke
Minister for Interior, Communities, Housing and Sport	Magdalena Finke born 13 November 1986 (age 40)	CDU	12 November 2025	Incumbent	Frederik Hogrefe; Sönke E. Schulz
Minister for Energy Transition, Climate Protection, Environment and Nature	Tobias Goldschmidt born 16 September 1981 (age 45)	GRÜNE	29 June 2022	Incumbent	Katja Günther; Joschka Knuth
Minister for Economics, Transport, Labour, Technology and Tourism	Claus Ruhe Madsen born 27 August 1972 (age 54)	CDU(Independent until May 2023, CDU nomination)	29 June 2022	Incumbent	Tobias von der Heide; Julia Carstens
Minister for Agriculture, Rural Areas, Europe and Consumer Protection	Werner Schwarz born 10 April 1960 (age 66)	CDU	29 June 2022	11 November 2025	Anne Benett-Sturies
Minister for Agriculture, Rural Areas, Europe and Consumer Protection	Cornelia Schmachtenberg born 17 February 1991 (age 35)	CDU	12 November 2025	Incumbent	Otto Carstens
Chief of the State Chancellery	Dirk Schrödter born 17 October 1978 (age 48)	CDU	29 June 2022	Incumbent	Johannes Callsen; Sandra Gerken
