= Claus Christian Claussen =

German lawyer, notary and politician

Member of the Landtag of Schleswig-Holstein
- Incumbent
- Assumed office 7 June 2022

Schleswig-Holstein Minister of Justice, European Affairs and Consumer Protection
- In office 4 May 2020 – 29 June 2022
- Appointed by: Daniel Günther
- Preceded by: Sabine Sütterlin-Waack
- Succeeded by: Kerstin von der Decken

Member of the Schleswig-Holstein Landtag for Northern Stormarn
- In office 6 June 2017 – 4 May 2017

Personal details
- Born: March 26, 1961 (age 65) Bad Segeberg, West Germany (now Germany)
- Party: CDU Christian Democratic Union (CDU)
- Education: University of Hamburg
- Occupation: Lawyer, Notary
- Cabinet: Cabinet Günther
- Website: www.christianclaussen.de

Claus Christian Claussen (born March 26, 1961) is a German lawyer, notary and politician of the Christian Democratic Union (CDU).

== Personal life and education ==
Claus Christian Claussen was born in Bad Segeberg in Schleswig-Holstein. He lives in Bargteheide, is married and has five children.

Claussen studied law at the University of Hamburg from 1982 to 1992 and worked as a lawyer at a law firm in Flensburg from 1992 to 1995.

== Career ==
From 1995 to 1997, he worked at the Waterways and Shipping Directorate in Kiel. Since 1997, he is an unaffiliated lawyer and in 2001, he became a licensed notary.

Claussen became a member of the Young Union in 1975 and a member of the Christian Democratic Union (CDU) in 1993, upon which he became deputy district chairman in Flensburg. In 1998, he got elected as a member of the municipal council of Bargteheide. In 2000, he became a board member of the Schleswig-Holstein Christian Democratic Union (CDU), a position he held until 2016. Claussen was Deputy Mayor of Bargteheide from 2008 to 2018. He was elected a member of the Schleswig-Holstein Landtag in the 2017 Schleswig-Holstein state elections and assumed his office on June 6, 2017.

He was appointed Schleswig-Holstein Minister of Justice, European Affairs and Consumer Protection by Minister-President Daniel Günther on May 4, 2020, succeeding Sabine Sütterlin-Waack. He was succeeded by Kerstin von der Decken on 29 June 2022.

Claussen was elected a Member of the Landtag of Schleswig-Holstein in the 2022 Schleswig-Holstein state election.
