= Günther cabinet =

Günther cabinet may refer to:

- First Günther cabinet, Schleswig-Holstein state government 2017-2022
- Second Günther cabinet, Schleswig-Holstein state government since 2022
