= 2022 Schleswig-Holstein state election =

German state election

- 8 May 2022

All 69 seats in the Landtag of Schleswig-Holstein 35 seats needed for a majority
- Turnout: 1,396,747 (60.4% ▼3.8pp)
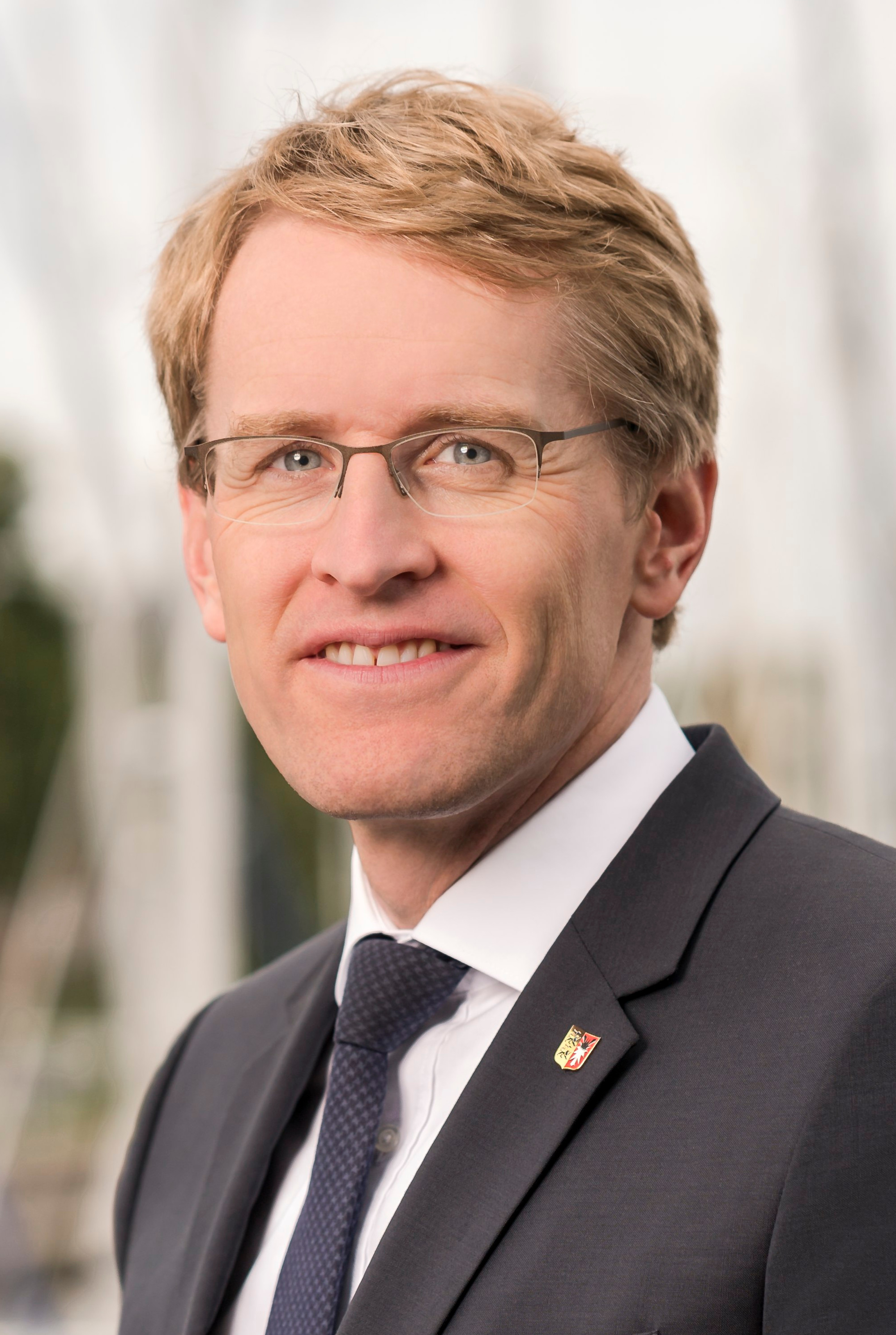

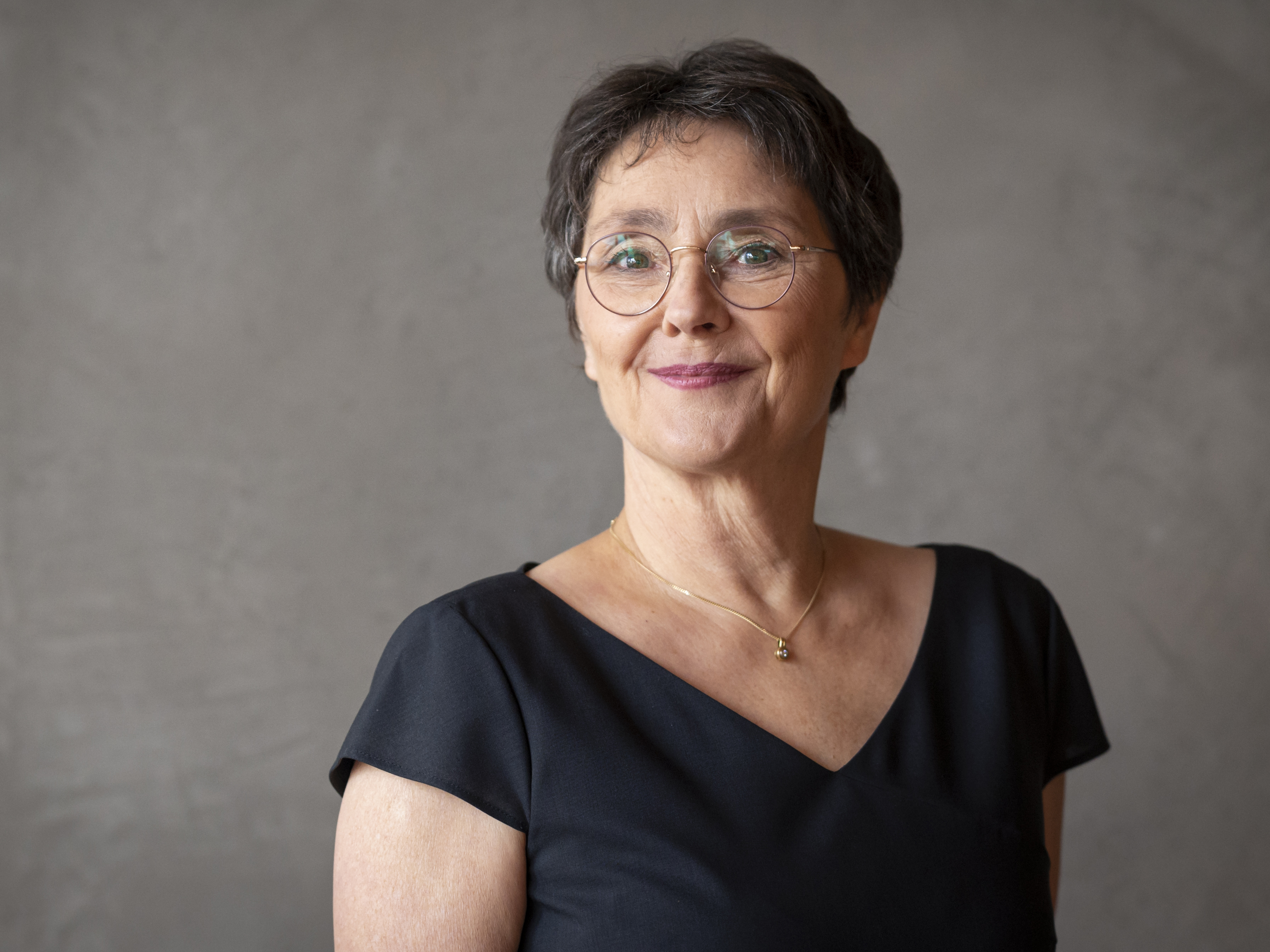

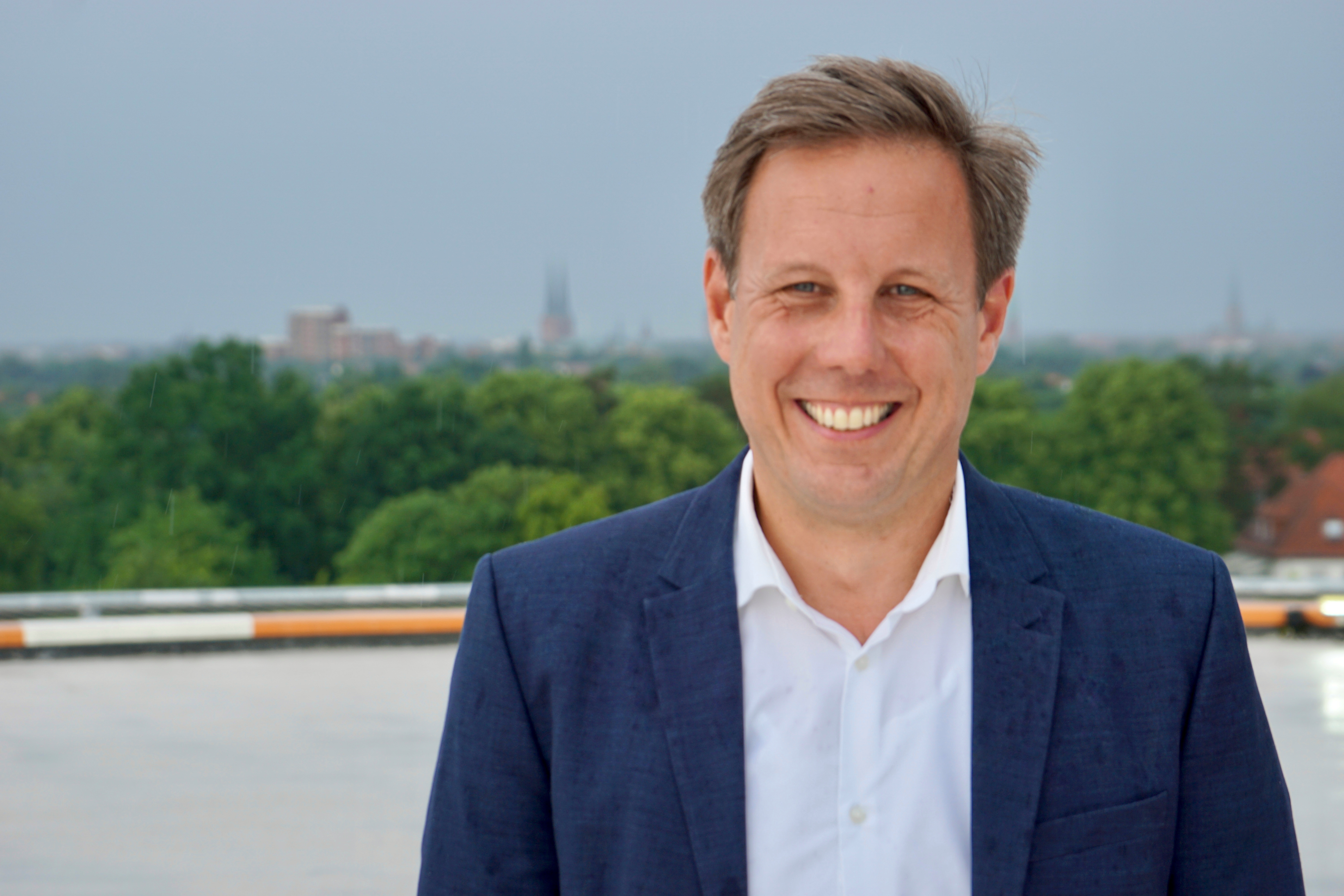

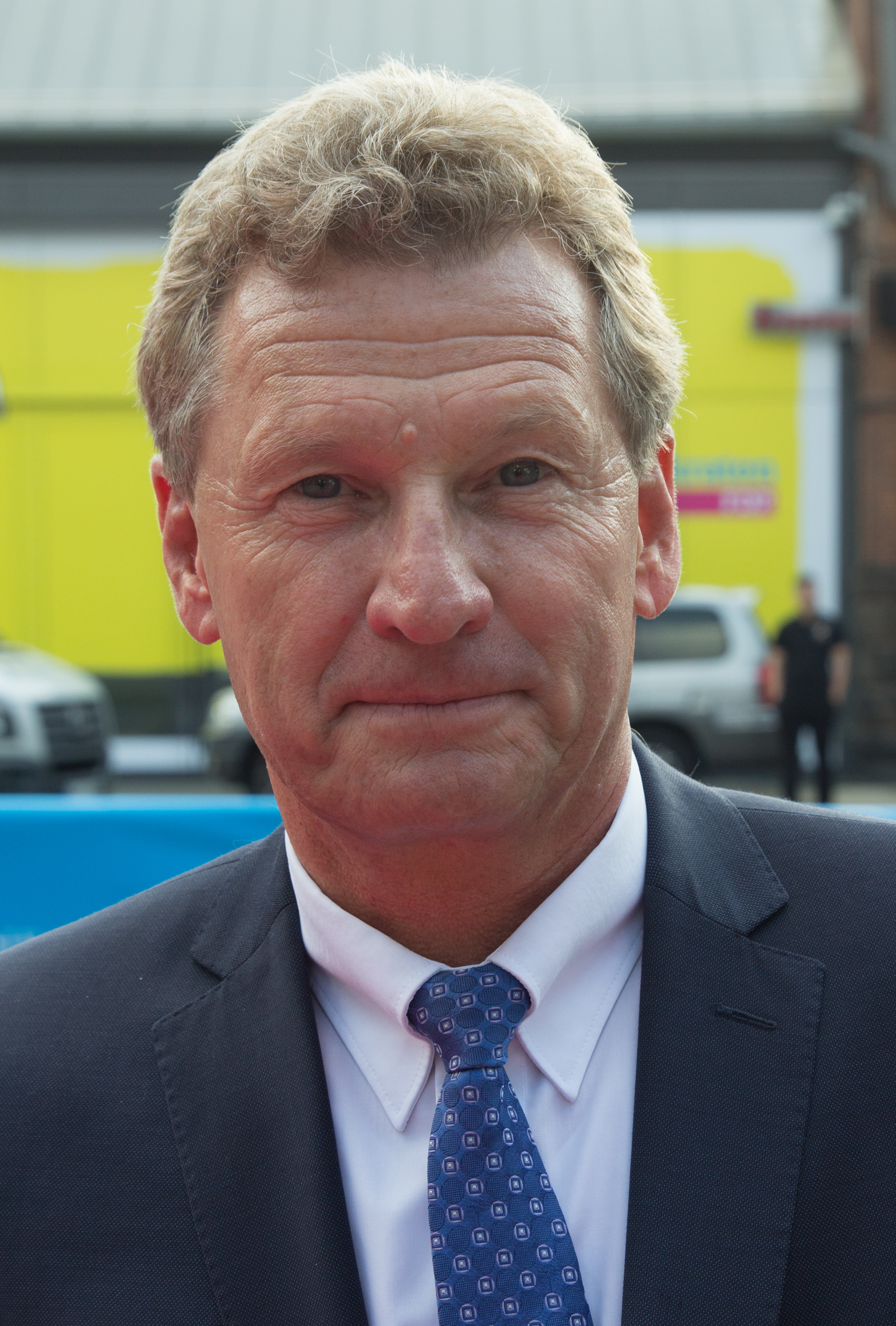

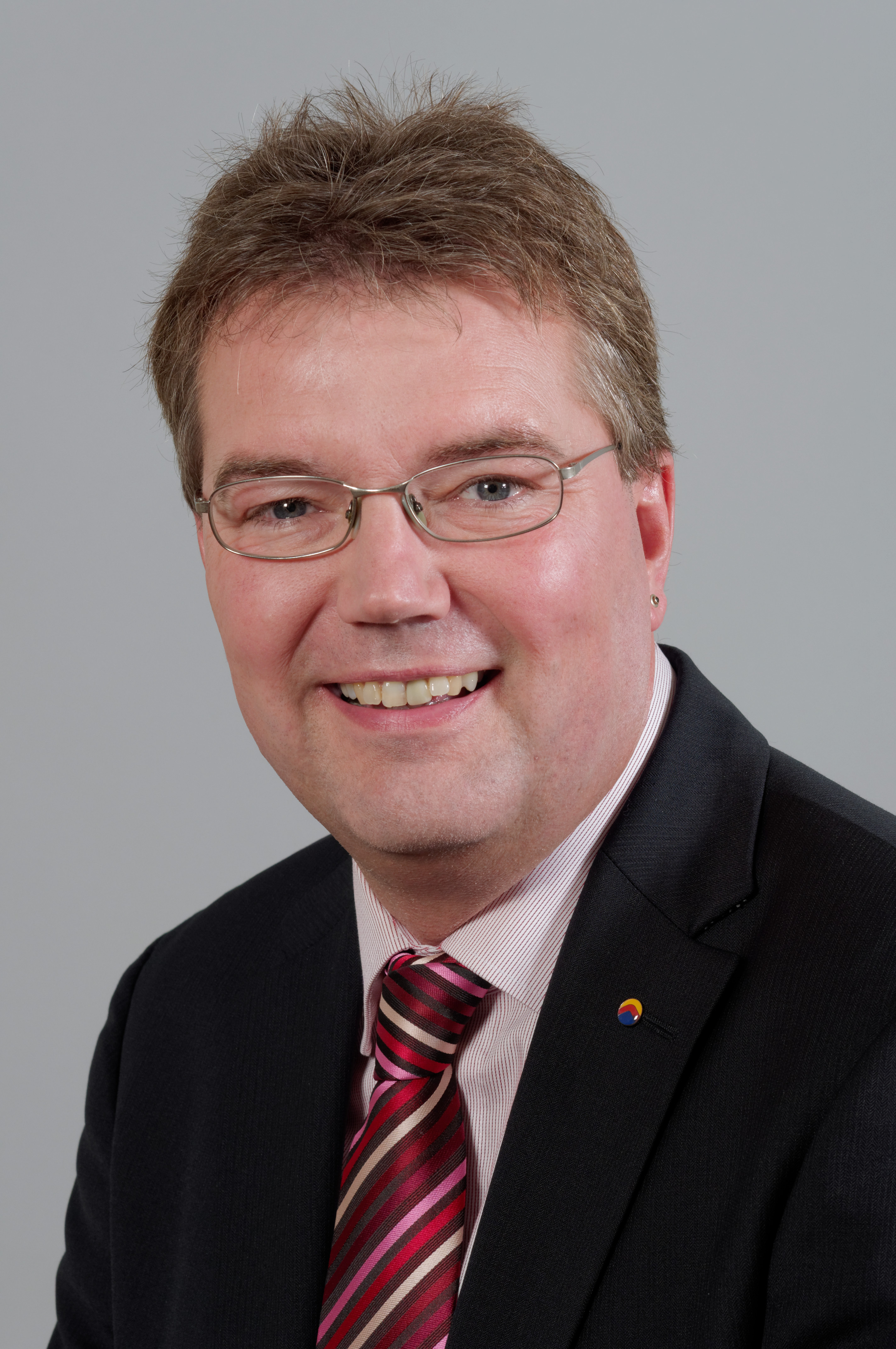

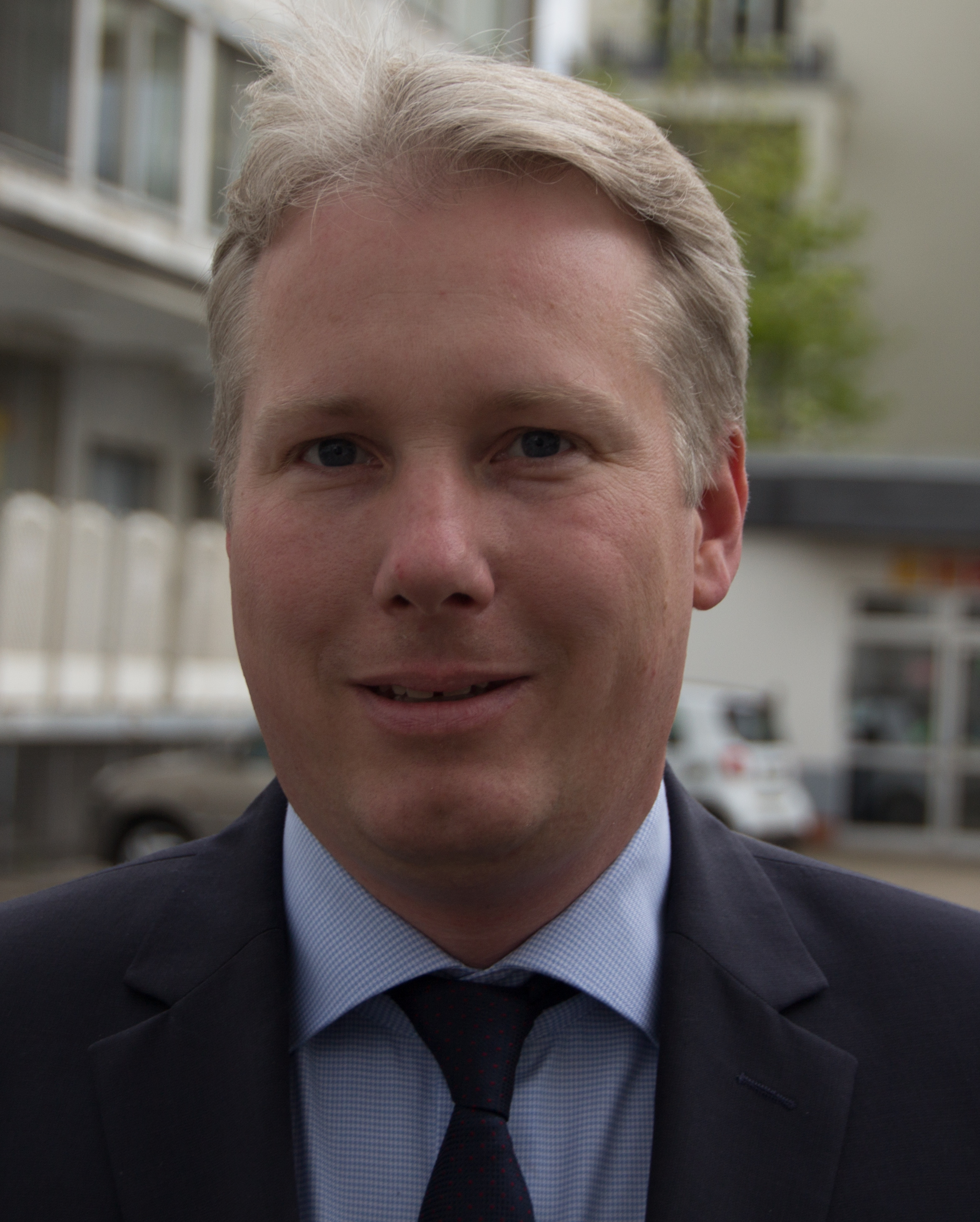
	First party	Second party	Third party
Leader	Daniel Günther	Monika Heinold	Thomas Losse-Müller
Party	CDU	Greens	SPD
Last election	25 seats, 32.0%	10 seats, 12.9%	21 seats, 27.3%
Seats won	34	14	12
Seat change	▲9	▲4	▼9
Popular vote	601,964	254,158	221,496
Percentage	43.4%	18.3%	16.0%
Swing	▲11.4pp	▲5.4pp	▼11.3pp
	Fourth party	Fifth party	Sixth party
Leader	Bernd Buchholz	Lars Harms	Jörg Nobis
Party	FDP	SSW	AfD
Last election	9 seats, 11.5%	3 seats, 3.3%	5 seats, 5.9%
Seats won	5	4	0
Seat change	▼4	▲1	▼5
Popular vote	88,593	79,301	61,141
Percentage	6.4%	5.7%	4.4%
Swing	▼5.1pp	▲2.4pp	▼1.5pp
- Results for the single-member constituencies
Government before election
First Günther cabinet
CDU–Green–FDP
Government after election
Second Günther cabinet
CDU–Green

The 2022 Schleswig-Holstein state election was held on 8 May 2022 to elect the 20th Landtag of Schleswig-Holstein. The outgoing government was a coalition of the Christian Democratic Union (CDU), The Greens, and the Free Democratic Party (FDP), led by Minister-President Daniel Günther.

The CDU won in a landslide, claiming 43% of the vote with a swing of over eleven percentage points and falling one seat short of an absolute majority in the Landtag. It is their best result since Uwe Barschel's 49 % showing in the 1983 state election. The opposition Social Democratic Party (SPD) suffered major losses and fell to third place with 16% of votes, its worst ever result in the state, while the Greens became the second-largest party with 18%. The FDP also declined to 6% and the Alternative for Germany (AfD) fell below the 5% electoral threshold, losing representation in a state parliament for the first time. The South Schleswig Voters' Association (SSW), which represents the Danish and Frisian minorities in Schleswig-Holstein, won 6%, their best result since the first post-war state election in 1947.

The CDU's victory was attributed to the personal popularity of Minister-President Günther, as well as the federal government's response to the 2022 Russian invasion of Ukraine, for which Chancellor Olaf Scholz has been criticised. In the lead-up to the election, Günther was the most popular Minister-President in Germany with an approval rating of 76%, and was preferred Minister-President even among opposition voters.

After the election, the CDU formed a coalition with the Greens. Daniel Günther was re-elected as Minister-President on 29 June.

== Election date ==
The Landtag is elected for five years, with its term commencing when the new Landtag first meets. The election must be held in or before June 2022.

== Electoral system ==
The Landtag is elected via mixed-member proportional representation. 35 members are elected in single-member constituencies via first-past-the-post voting. 34 members are then allocated using compensatory proportional representation. Voters have two votes: the "first vote" for candidates in single-member constituencies, and the "second vote" for party lists, which are used to fill the proportional seats. The minimum size of the Landtag is 69 members, but if overhang seats are present, proportional leveling seats will be added to ensure proportionality. An electoral threshold of 5% of valid votes is applied to the Landtag; parties that fall below this threshold, and fail to win at least one constituency, are ineligible to receive seats. Parties representing the Danish minority of Southern Schleswig and the Frisians, such as the South Schleswig Voters' Association, are exempt from the threshold.

== Background ==
In the previous election held on 7 May 2017, the CDU remained the largest party with 32.0% of votes cast, an increase of 1.2 percentage points. The SPD lost three points and placed second with 27.3% of votes. The Greens won 12.9% (–0.3pp), the FDP won 11.5% (+3.3pp), and the SSW won 3.3% (–1.3pp). The AfD contested its first election in Schleswig-Holstein, winning 5.9%.

The SPD had led a coalition with the Greens and SSW since 2012, but this government lost its majority in the election. The CDU subsequently formed a coalition with the Greens and FDP, and Daniel Günther became Minister-President.

== Parties ==
The table below lists parties represented in the 19th Landtag of Schleswig-Holstein.

Name		Ideology	Leader(s)	Leading candidate	2017 result	
Name		Ideology	Leader(s)	Leading candidate	Votes (%)	Seats
CDU	Christian Democratic Union of Germany; Christlich Demokratische Union Deutschlands	Christian democracy	Daniel Günther		32.0%	25 / 73
SPD	Social Democratic Party of Germany; Sozialdemokratische Partei Deutschlands	Social democracy	Serpil Midyatli	Thomas Losse-Müller	27.3%	21 / 73
Grüne	Alliance 90/The Greens; Bündnis 90/Die Grünen	Green politics	Ann-Kathrin Tranziska; Steffen Regis	Monika Heinold	12.9%	10 / 73
FDP	Free Democratic Party; Freie Demokratische Partei	Classical liberalism	Heiner Garg	Bernd Buchholz	11.5%	9 / 73
AfD	Alternative for Germany; Alternative für Deutschland	Right-wing populism	Vacant	Jörg Nobis	5.9%	5 / 73
SSW	South Schleswig Voter Federation; Südschleswigscher Wählerverband	Danish and Frisian minority interests	Flemming Meyer	Lars Harms	3.3%	3 / 73

== Opinion polling ==
=== Graphical summary ===
Local regression of polls conducted.

=== Party polling ===
Polling firm	Fieldwork date	Sample size	CDU	SPD	Grüne	FDP	AfD	Linke	SSW	FW	Others	Lead
2022 state election	8 May 2022	–	43.4	16.0	18.3	6.4	4.4	1.7	5.7	0.6	3.5	25.1
Wahlkreisprognose	4–6 May 2022	918	39	17.5	17.5	7	5.5	2	5.5	–	6	21.5
Forschungsgruppe Wahlen	2–5 May 2022	1,704	38	18	18	8	6	–	6	–	6	20
INSA	25 Apr–2 May 2022	1,000	36	20	16	9	6	3	5	–	5	16
Wahlkreisprognose	25–29 Apr 2022	913	39	18.5	17.5	7	5	2	5	–	6	20.5
Forschungsgruppe Wahlen	25–28 Apr 2022	1,011	38	19	17	7	6	3	5	–	5	19
Infratest dimap	25–27 Apr 2022	1,530	38	19	16	9	5	–	5	–	8	19
Wahlkreisprognose	16–23 Apr 2022	920	39.5	21	16	7	4.5	2	4	–	6	18.5
Infratest dimap	13–19 Apr 2022	1,172	38	20	16	9	6	–	4	–	7	18
Wahlkreisprognose	23 Mar–2 Apr 2022	950	37	22	17	6.5	4.5	2	4	–	7	15
Infratest dimap	24–29 Mar 2022	1,158	36	20	18	8	6	–	4	–	8	16
INSA	21–28 Mar 2022	1,008	28	27	16	11	6	3	4	2	3	1
Wahlkreisprognose	3–11 Mar 2022	1,020	35	19.5	19.5	9	5	2.5	5	–	4.5	15.5
Infratest dimap	3–8 Mar 2022	1,168	33	20	20	9	6	3	4	–	5	13
Wahlkreisprognose	10–19 Feb 2022	2,000	30	25	17	9	6	3	5	–	5	5
INSA	24–31 Jan 2022	1,003	25	28	15	12	7	4	3	3	3	3
Wahlkreisprognose	19–27 Jan 2022	1,390	31	25	17	8	6	2	5.5	–	5.5	6
Infratest dimap	13–18 Jan 2022	1,167	28	23	20	10	7	3	4	–	5	5
Wahlkreisprognose	1–13 Dec 2021	1,030	24	29	20	12.5	4	2	4.5	–	4	5
INSA	15–22 Nov 2021	1,001	21	28	18	14	7	4	3	2	3	7
Wahlkreisprognose	14–24 Oct 2021	945	23	29	22	14	3	2	4	–	3	6
2021 federal election	26 Sep 2021	–	22.0	28.0	18.3	12.5	6.8	3.6	3.2	1.0	4.6	6.0
Infratest dimap	21–26 May 2021	1,220	28	15	27	11	6	4	3	–	6	1
INSA	10–17 May 2021	1,000	25	21	27	11	6	3	3	2	2	2
Wahlkreisprognose	21–30 Mar 2021	–	28	19	29	11	3	3	3.5	–	3.5	1
INSA	16–23 Nov 2020	1,002	33	20	24	8	6	3	3	–	3	9
INSA	13–20 Jan 2020	1,000	28	20	26	9	7	3	3	–	4	2
2019 European election	26 May 2019	–	26.2	17.1	29.1	5.9	7.4	3.7	–	0.9	9.7	2.9
INSA	28 Jan–4 Feb 2019	1,002	30	20	22	9	7	5	3	1	3	8
Infratest dimap	12–18 Apr 2018	1,002	34	22	18	8	6	6	3	–	3	12
2017 federal election	24 Sep 2017	–	34.0	23.3	12.0	12.6	8.2	7.3	–	0.6	1.9	10.7
2017 state election	7 May 2017	–	32.0	27.3	12.9	11.5	5.9	3.8	3.3	0.6	1.7	4.7

== Results ==
Party	Constituency			List			Total seats	+/–
Party	Votes	%	Seats	Votes	%	Swing	Total seats	+/–
Christian Democratic Union of Germany (CDU)	577,506	41.9	32	601,964	43.4	▲11.4	34	▲9
Alliance 90/The Greens (GRÜNE)	260,122	18.9	3	254,158	18.3	▲5.4	14	▲4
Social Democratic Party of Germany (SPD)	284,373	20.6	0	221,496	16.0	▼11.3	12	▼9
Free Democratic Party (FDP)	84,520	6.1	0	88,593	6.4	▼5.1	5	▼4
South Schleswig Voters' Association (SSW)	48,551	3.5	0	79,301	5.7	▲2.4	4	▲1
Alternative for Germany (AfD)	62,413	4.5	0	61,141	4.4	▼1.5	0	▼5
The Left (DIE LINKE)	29,739	2.2	0	23,054	1.7	▼2.1	0	±0
Grassroots Democratic Party of Germany (dieBasis)	9,684	0.7	0	15,400	1.1	New	0	New
Die PARTEI	3,096	0.2	0	10,292	0.7	▲0.2	0	±0
Human Environment Animal Protection Party (Tierschutzpartei)	–	–	–	10,227	0.7	New	0	New
Free Voters (FW)	13,803	1.0	0	8,190	0.6	0.0	0	±0
Pirate Party Germany (Piraten)	–	–	–	4,753	0.3	▼0.8	0	±0
Volt Germany (Volt)	1,896	0.1	0	4,215	0.3	New	0	New
Future (Z.)	442	0.0	0	1,692	0.1	▼0.2	0	±0
The Humanists (Die Humanisten)	302	0.0	0	1,603	0.1	New	0	New
Party for Health Research (Gesundheitsforschung)	–	–	–	1,319	0.1	New	0	New
Liberal Conservative Reformers (LKR)	368	0.0	0	–	–	▼0.2	0	±0
Family Party of Germany (FAMILIE)	227	0.0	0	–	–	▼0.6	0	±0
Alliance C – Christians for Germany (Bündnis C)	154	0.0	0	–	–	–	0	New
Independents	1,656	0.1	0	–	–	–	0	±0
Valid	1,378,852	98.7		1,387,398	99.3			
Invalid	17,895	1.3		9,349	0.7			
Total	1,396,747	100.0	35	1,396,747	100.0		69	–4
Registered voters/turnout	2,314,417	60.4		2,314,417	60.4	▼3.8		
Source: State Returning Officer

CDU vote

Green vote

SPD vote

FDP vote

AfD vote

SSW vote

== Voter demographics and analysis ==
Sociology of the electorate
Demographic	CDU	Grüne	SPD	FDP	SSW	AfD	Linke	Others
Total vote	43%	18%	16%	6.5%	6%	4.5%	2%	4%
Sex
Men	42%	16%	16%	8%	6%	6%	2%	4%
Women	44%	20%	16%	5%	6%	3%	2%	4%
Age
16–24 years old	23%	26%	13%	12%	8%	4%	5%	9%
25–34 years old	30%	22%	15%	8%	7%	7%	3%	8%
35–44 years old	38%	20%	14%	7%	6%	6%	2%	7%
45–59 years old	45%	19%	14%	6%	6%	5%	1%	4%
60–69 years old	47%	18%	18%	5%	5%	3%	1%	3%
70 or older	55%	12%	20%	5%	4%	2%	1%	1%
Education
Low	50%	7%	22%	5%	6%	6%	1%	3%
High	35%	27%	14%	7%	5%	4%	2%	6%
Socio-occupational classification
Blue-collar worker	39%	12%	14%	6%	7%	15%	7%	
White-collar worker	40%	21%	15%	7%	6%	4%	8%	
Self-employed	47%	19%	9%	10%	6%	4%	5%	
Retired	52%	14%	20%	5%	5%	2%	2%	
Agglomeration
Rural commune	47%	16%	14%	7%	7%	4%	5%	
Small town	46%	16%	17%	6%	4%	5%	6%	
Medium-sized town	39%	20%	17%	6%	6%	5%	7%	
Large town	33%	27%	19%	6%	5%	3%	7%	
Source: Infratest dimap

== Government formation ==
The CDU fell just one seat short of a majority in the Landtag and could form a coalition with any of the other parties. After the election, Minister-President Günther stated his intention to seek a renewal of the incumbent Jamaica coalition with both the Greens and FDP. On 19 May, he announced that exploratory talks had failed because neither of the smaller parties desired to continue a three-party coalition when only two parties were necessary for a majority. Four days later, the CDU extended an invitation to the Greens for coalition talks, which was accepted. As negotiations proceeded in early June, the two parties emphasised their mutual commitment to climate protection and social justice, and a rapid transition to renewable energy and climate neutrality. Agreement was also found in policy areas such as digitalisation and education, while they disagreed on security, agriculture, transport, and housing.

On 22 June, the CDU and Greens announced that they had finalised a coalition agreement. In the new cabinet, the number of ministers was increased by one as the agriculture portfolio will be split from that of environment and energy. The health ministry was also transferred from the social affairs ministry to the justice ministry. Five ministers – economy, justice, education, interior, and agriculture – were allocated to the CDU and three to the Greens. Among them, Monika Heinold remained Deputy Minister-President and finance minister, while Tobias Goldschmidt became environment minister and Aminata Touré minister for social affairs. The agreement was approved overwhelmingly by both parties' congresses on 27 June, with the Greens recording four dissenting votes and the CDU none.

Daniel Günther was re-elected as Minister-President by the Landtag on 29 June, winning 47 votes out of 66 cast, including four abstentions.
