= Kerstin von der Decken =

German politician

State Minister of Justice and Health of Schleswig-Holstein
- Incumbent
- Assumed office 29 June 2022
- Preceded by: Justice: Claus Christian Claussen; Health: Heiner Garg

Personal details
- Born: Odendahl; 29 November 1968 (age 57) Hamburg, West Germany (now Germany)
- Party: CDU Christian Democratic Union of Germany (CDU)
- Education: University of Bonn, University of Trier

Kerstin von der Decken (born 29 November 1968 in Hamburg) is a German legal scholar and politician of the Christian Democratic Union (CDU) who has been serving as State Minister of Justice and Health in the government of Minister-President of Schleswig-Holstein Daniel Günther since 2022.

== Early life and career ==
Between 1988 and 1994, von der Decken studied Law and International Relations at the University of Bonn and Trier.

She then worked as a Professor of International Law, European Law, foreign Public Law and Comparative Law at the University of St. Gallen. She became Dean of the St. Gallen Faculty of Law in 2009.

In 2011, von der Decken went to Kiel to teach Public law at the Christian-Albrechts-University in Kiel. In 2016, she became Dean of the Faculty of Law in Kiel. She held both offices until 2018.

== Political career ==
On 29 June 2022, von der Decken joined the second Günther cabinet as Schleswig-Holstein's State Minister of Justice and Health. In this capacity, she has also been one of the state's representatives on the Bundesrat, where she has been serving on the Committee on Legal Affairs and the Health Committee.

In the negotiations to form a Grand Coalition under the leadership of Friedrich Merz's Christian Democrats (CDU together with the Bavarian CSU) and the SPD following the 2025 German elections, von der Decken was part of the CDU/CSU delegation in the working group on health, led by Karl-Josef Laumann, Stephan Pilsinger and Katja Pähle.
