= Kristina Herbst =

German politician (born 1977)

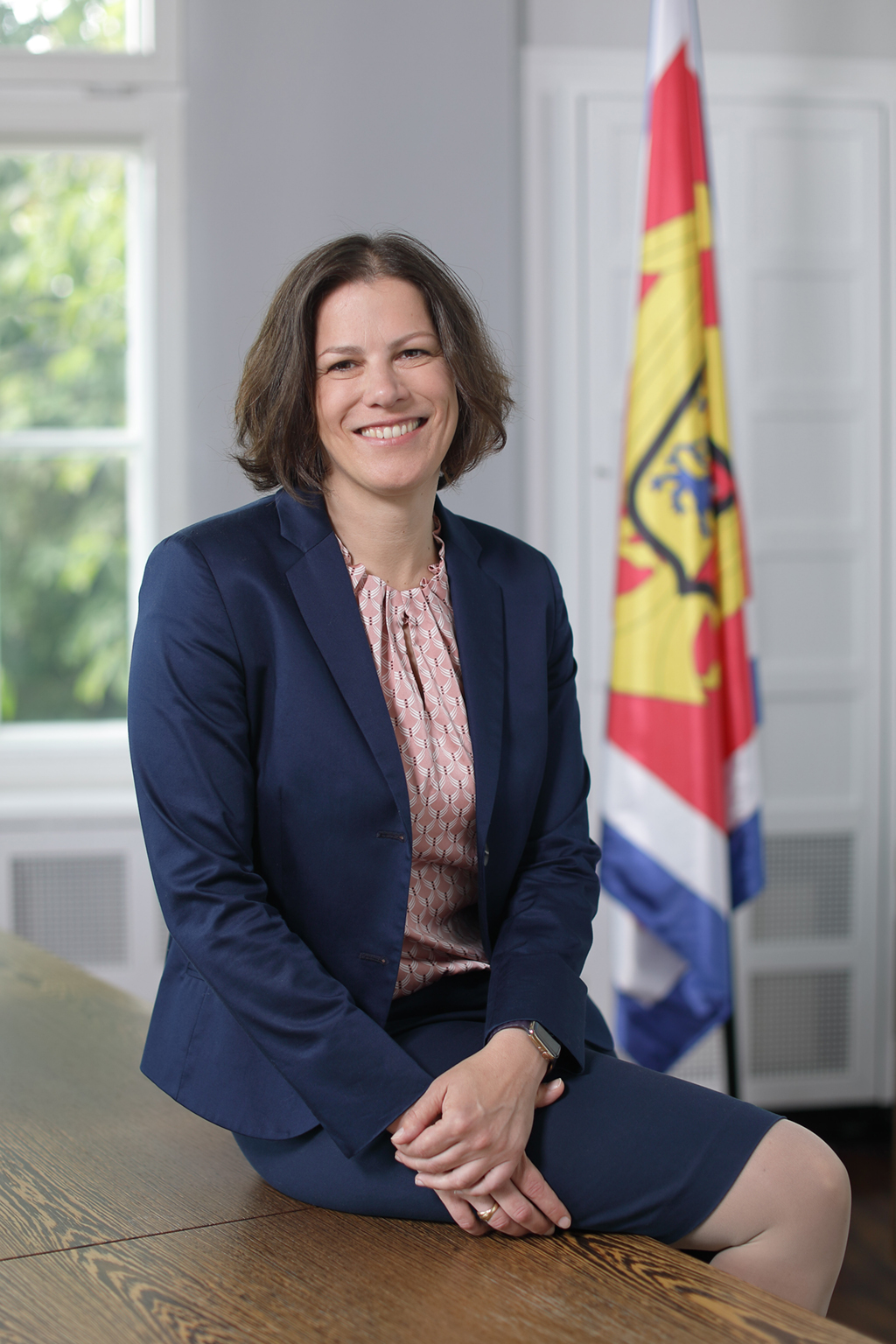
- Herbst in 2022

President of the Landtag of Schleswig-Holstein
- Incumbent
- Assumed office 7 June 2022
- Preceded by: Klaus Schlie

State Secretary to the Schleswig-Holstein Ministry of the Interior, Rural Areas, Integration and Equality
- In office 28 June 2017 – 7 June 2022
- Appointed by: Daniel Günther
- Minister: Sabine Sütterlin-Waack

Personal details
- Born: 24 August 1977 (age 49) Bremen, Germany
- Party: CDU Christian Democratic Union of Germany (CDU)

Kristina Herbst (born 24 August 1977 in Bremen, Germany) is a German politician of the Christian Democratic Union (CDU) and current president of the Landtag of Schleswig-Holstein.

== Personal life and education ==
Herbst has three children.

== Career ==
Kristina Herbst used to be State Secretary to the Schleswig-Holstein Ministry of the Interior, Rural Areas, Integration and Equality, serving under Minister Sabine Sütterlin-Waack as part of the cabinet of Daniel Günther.

She was elected President of the Landtag of Schleswig-Holstein on 7 June 2022 and subsequently resigned her post as State Secretary.
