= Karin Prien =

German lawyer and politician (born 1965)

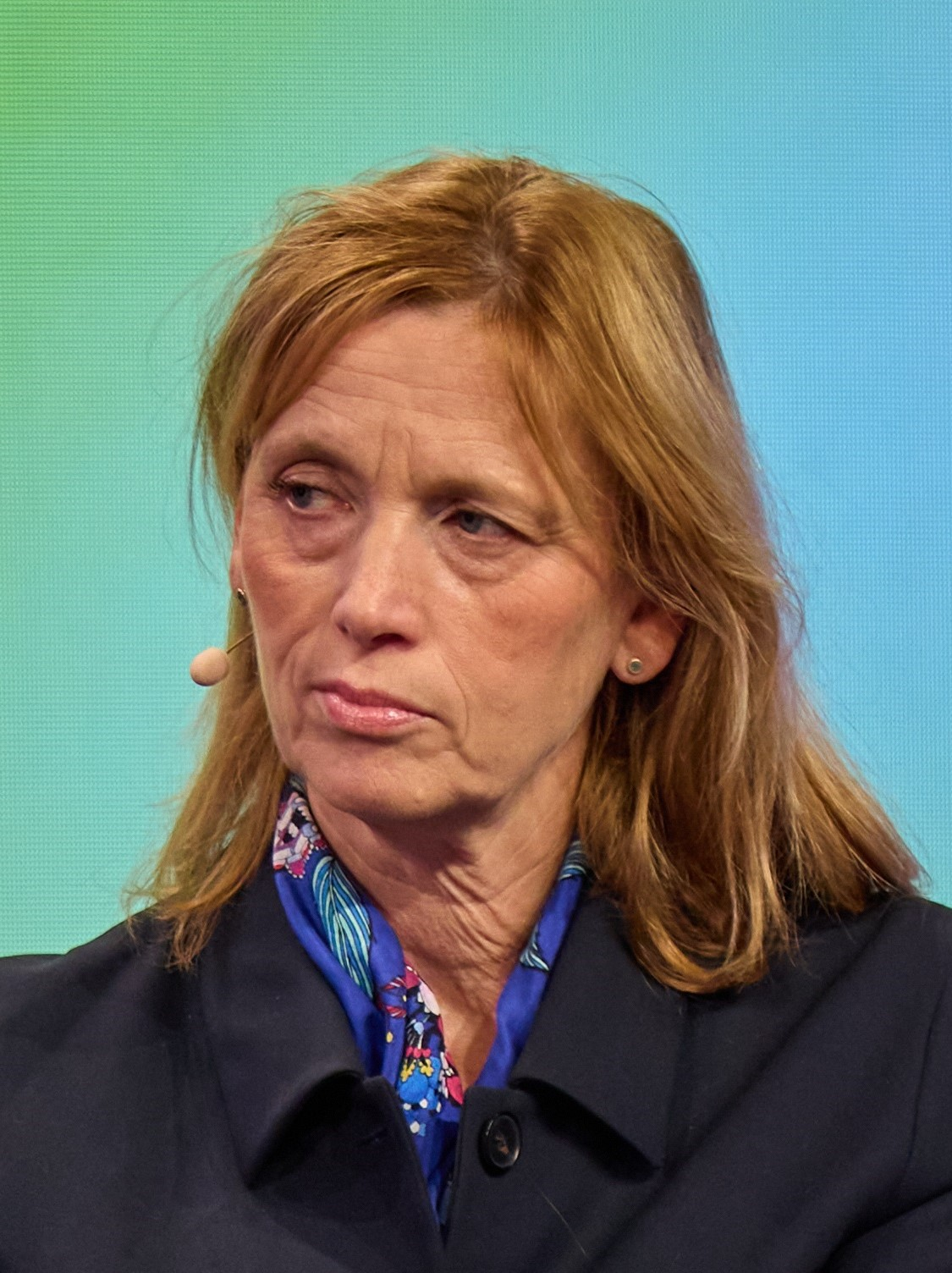
- Prien in 2025

Minister for Education, Family Affairs, Senior Citizens, Women and Youth
- Incumbent
- Assumed office 6 May 2025
- Chancellor: Friedrich Merz
- Preceded by: Cem Özdemir (as Minister of Education and Research); Lisa Paus (as Minister of Family, Seniors, Women and Youth)

Deputy Leader of the Christian Democratic Union
- Incumbent
- Assumed office 31 January 2022 Serving with: Silvia Breher; Michael Kretschmer; Karl-Josef Laumann; Andreas Jung
- Leader: Friedrich Merz
- Preceded by: Julia Klöckner

Minister for Education, Training, Science, Research and Culture of Schleswig-Holstein
- In office 28 June 2017 – 7 May 2025
- Minister-President: Daniel Günther
- Preceded by: Britta Ernst
- Succeeded by: Dorit Stenke

Member of the Hamburg Parliament
- In office 20 February 2011 – 28 June 2017
- Constituency: Altona

Personal details
- Born: Karin Kraus; 26 June 1965 (age 61) Amsterdam, Netherlands
- Citizenship: Germany
- Party: Christian Democratic Union (since 1981)
- Spouse: Jochen Prien
- Children: 3
- Education: University of Bonn; Free University of Amsterdam
- Occupation: Lawyer • Politician

Karin Prien (née Kraus; born 26 June 1965) is a German lawyer and politician of the Christian Democratic Union (CDU) who has been serving as Federal Minister for Education, Family Affairs, Senior Citizens, Women and Youth in the government of Chancellor Friedrich Merz since 2025; she is the first woman of Jewish ancestry to head a ministry in a post-war German government.

From 2017 to 2025, Prien served as State Minister of Education, Science and Culture of Schleswig-Holstein in the government of Minister-President Daniel Günther. Since 2022, she has been one of four deputy chairs of the CDU, under the leadership of chairman Friedrich Merz.

== Early life and education ==
Born in Amsterdam, Prien is Jewish and first grew up in the Netherlands, where her maternal grandparents had fled in the early 1930s before the emergence of National Socialism in Germany. She later moved to Germany.

After graduation (Abitur) in 1984 in Rhineland-Palatinate, Prien studied law and political science in Bonn. From 1986 to 1989, she was a student assistant of Friedbert Pflüger, then the press secretary of the Federal President Richard von Weizsäcker. She took the first Staatsexamen in 1989, which was followed by the LL.M. after postgraduate studies in Amsterdam in 1991 and the second Staatsexamen in Celle in 1994.

== Early career ==
Since 1994, Prien has been an independent lawyer specializing in commercial and insolvency law in Hanover, Leipzig and Hamburg. Since 2008, she has been a certified lawyer for commercial and corporate law, and also a mediator since 2011.

== Political career ==
=== Early beginnings ===
Prien became a member of the CDU in 1981. She was from 2004 to April 2012 deputy CDU local chairwoman in Blankenese, from 2006 Deputy District Chairwoman in the district association Altona-Elbvororte, and since 2010 a member of the CDU state executive committee. From January 2014 she had been local chairwoman of the CDU in Blankenese, an office she passed on to Johann Riekers after her move to Schleswig-Holstein. In addition, Prien is chairwoman of the Jewish Forum of the CDU.

=== Member of the Hamburg Parliament, 2011–2017 ===
As a candidate of the CDU in her constituency of Blankenese, Prien was elected to the Hamburg state parliament in 2011 for the first time. She was a political spokeswoman for the CDU parliamentary group and a member of the parliamentary group's leadership.

In the 2015 state election, Prien again won a direct mandate in the constituency of Blankenese with 11.5 percent of the votes. In the parliament, she was a member of the Budget Committee, the Constitution and District Committee, the School Committee and the Committee on Social Affairs, Labor and Integration. She was Deputy Group Chair and Specialist for the School and Constitution of the CDU. In the course of her change to the state government of Schleswig-Holstein, she resigned in June 2017 from the Hamburg Parliament; her parliament mandate was taken over by Wolfhard Ploog.

=== State Minister of Education in Schleswig-Holstein, 2017–2025 ===
After formation of a Jamaica coalition of CDU, FDP and Greens in the wake of the 2017 Schleswig-Holstein state election, Prien was appointed Minister of Education, Science and Culture of Schleswig-Holstein on 28 June 2017 and became part of the state government of Minister-President Günther.

In the negotiations to form a fourth coalition government under Chancellor Angela Merkel following the 2017 federal elections, Prien was part of the working group on education policy, led by Annegret Kramp-Karrenbauer, Stefan Müller and Hubertus Heil.

Since 17 November 2018, Prien has been one of the four deputy chairs of the CDU Schleswig-Holstein, succeeding State Minister for Justice Sabine Sütterlin-Waack who did not run for reelection. Prien supports the CDU-internal group "Union of the Middle," which is regarded as the counterpart of the conservative "value union."

Ahead of the 2021 elections, CDU chairman Armin Laschet included Prien in his eight-member shadow cabinet for the Christian Democrats' campaign.

Prien was nominated by her party as delegate to the Federal Convention for the purpose of electing the President of Germany in 2022.

During the COVID-19 pandemic, Prien caused a controversy by tweeting that children were dying "with" Covid and only rarely "because of" it. While the limited data at the time did indeed suggest that only very few deaths of children in Germany could be attributed directly to Covid alone, users criticized Prien's implied assumption that vulnerable children with preexisting conditions did not deserve protection. Prien consequently deactivated her Twitter account.

Upon being appointed to the federal government following the 2025 federal election, Prien was succeeded by Dorit Stenke on 7 May.

== Other activities ==
- Nordmetall Foundation, Member of the Board of Trustees (since 2018)
- Cultural Foundation of the German States (KdL), Ex-Officio Member of the Board of Trustees (since 2017)
- Schleswig-Holstein Musik Festival, Ex-Officio Member of the Board of Trustees (since 2017)
- Freundeskreis Yad Vashem, Member
- David Ben-Gurion Foundation, Member of the Board of Trustees
- Haus Rissen, Member of the Board of Trustees
- Stiftung Lesen, Member of the Board of Trustees
- ELNET (organization), Member of the advisory council

== Political positions ==
For the 2021 national elections, Prien endorsed Armin Laschet as the Christian Democrats' joint candidate to succeed Chancellor Angela Merkel.

In early 2022, Prien called for Hans-Georg Maaßen to be expelled from the CDU.

She opposes Gendern, a form of writing in which the three grammatical genders, which are usually represented through different words, are combined by adding special characters within the word.

== Personal life ==
Prien is married to lawyer Jochen Prien and has three children.
