= Jamaica coalition (politics) =

German political term

Flag of Jamaica, which features the black-yellow-green colour scheme, hence the coalition's nickname

Jamaica coalition (German: Jamaika-Koalition; also known as the Jamaica alliance, Jamaica traffic light, black traffic light or Schwampel) is a term in German politics describing a governing coalition among the parties of the Christian Democratic Union/Christian Social Union (CDU/CSU), Free Democratic Party (FDP), and the Green Party.

The term comes from the fact that the symbolic colors of the parties in such a coalition—black for the conservative CDU/CSU, yellow for the liberal FDP, and green for the Green Party—resemble the color scheme of the flag of Jamaica.

== History ==
After the German federal election in 2005 a Jamaica coalition became mathematically possible and was initially discussed. The Free Democrats decided they would not form a coalition with the Social Democrats (SPD), leaving the Jamaica coalition as one of the few remaining options, but the Greens rejected the coalition proposal. "Can you really see [CDU and CSU leaders] Angela Merkel and Edmund Stoiber sitting round the table in dreadlocks?" asked Joschka Fischer, the Greens' leader at the time. "This is more our style. It's impossible. I don't see that." In October 2005, the CDU/CSU and SPD formed a grand coalition instead.

At the state level, the Greens announced in October 2009 that they would support a CDU/FDP coalition in Saarland, forming Germany's first Jamaica coalition in state government. This move was partly prompted by desire to prevent an SPD minority government in Saarland dependent upon support from Die Linke. The Saarland coalition collapsed in January 2012.

A Jamaica coalition held power in the state of Schleswig-Holstein from 2017 to 2022. After the 2017 Schleswig-Holstein state election, CDU leader Daniel Günther became Minister President by forming a coalition with the Free Democrats led by Wolfgang Kubicki and the Greens led by Monika Heinold. After the 2022 election, the FDP was dropped from the governing coalition.

=== 2017 ===
A Jamaica coalition was unsuccessfully negotiated at the national level in Germany following the 2017 federal election. After the SPD initially announced their return to opposition, it became the only viable coalition that didn't involve Alternative for Germany. Coalition talks failed after the FDP pulled out of talks, citing an inability to find a compromise on migration and energy policy.

== Black traffic light ==
Another nickname for this coalition is black traffic light (German: Schwarze Ampel or the portmanteau word Schwampel). This term alludes to the classic traffic light coalition, an alliance between the SPD (red), FDP (yellow), and the Greens, together whose symbolic colors match the colors of most German traffic lights. In a black traffic light, the CDU's color black would replace the SPD's red. Classic traffic light coalitions have already governed at the state level in Brandenburg, Bremen and Rhineland-Palatinate, and federally after the 2021 federal election. The first known appearance of the short form Schwampel was in the Tageszeitung newspaper (Bremen edition) on 4 October 1991.

== Use of the term in Belgium ==
In Belgian politics, the term Jamaica coalition refers to a coalition of Christian democrats (CD&V, cdH and CSP), liberals (Open Vld, MR and PFF) and greens (Groen and Ecolo). The term has been adopted from German politics, even though the colors of the Belgian parties in question (orange, blue and green, respectively) do not correspond to those of the Jamaican flag. Even if this kind of coalition remains hypothetical on a federal, regional or provincial level, it has been formed in various municipalities, such as in Holsbeek in 2018.
