= First Günther cabinet =

State government of Schleswig-Holstein

First Cabinet of Daniel Günther Cabinet Günther I
- 26th Cabinet of Schleswig-Holstein
- 28 June 2017 – 29 June 2022
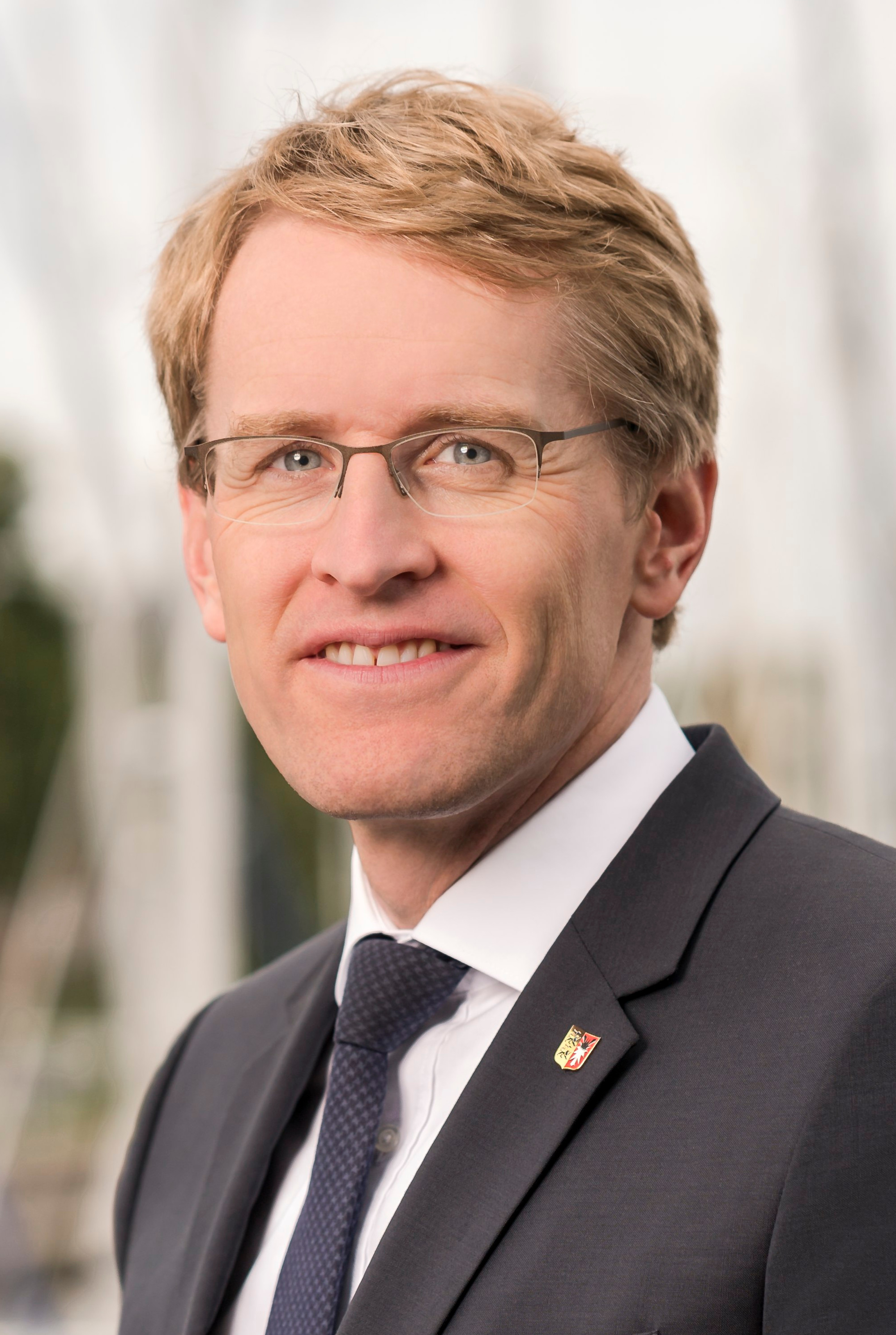
- Daniel Günther in July 2017
- Date formed: 28 June 2017
- Date dissolved: 28 June 2022

People and organisations
- Minister-President: Daniel Günther
- Deputy Minister-President: Robert Habeck (until Feb 2018); Monika Heinold (from Feb 2018) Heiner Garg
- No. of ministers: 7
- Member parties: Christian Democratic Union; Alliance 90/The Greens; Free Democratic Party
- Status in legislature: Coalition government (Majority)
- Opposition parties: Social Democratic Party; Alternative for Germany; South Schleswig Voters' Association

History
- Election: 2017 Schleswig-Holstein state election
- Legislature term: 19th Landtag of Schleswig-Holstein
- Predecessor: Albig cabinet
- Successor: Second Günther cabinet

The first Günther cabinet was the state government of Schleswig-Holstein from between 2017 and 2022, sworn in after Daniel Günther was elected as Minister-President of Schleswig-Holstein by the members of the Landtag of Schleswig-Holstein. It was the 26th Cabinet of Schleswig-Holstein.

It was formed after the 2017 Schleswig-Holstein state election by the Christian Democratic Union (CDU), Alliance 90/The Greens (GRÜNE) and Free Democratic Party (FDP). Excluding the Minister-President, the cabinet comprised seven ministers. Three were members of the CDU, two were members of the Greens, and two were members of the FDP.

The first Günther cabinet was succeeded by the second Günther cabinet on 29 June 2022.

== Formation ==
The previous cabinet was a coalition government of the Social Democratic Party, Greens, and South Schleswig Voters' Association led by Minister-President Torsten Albig.

The election took place on 7 May 2017, and resulted in small losses for all three governing parties. The opposition CDU and FDP both recorded a swing toward them, while the AfD debuted at 6%.

Overall, the incumbent coalition lost its majority. The CDU invited the Greens and FDP to exploratory talks, seeking to form a "Jamaica coalition" of the three. The SPD did the same in hopes of forming a traffic light coalition, but the FDP turned down their invitation, citing conflicts with parliamentary leader Ralf Stegner and an unwillingness from the SPD to compromise. Nonetheless, the Greens stated that a government with the SPD and FDP was their preferred outcome.

After exploratory talks, the CDU and FDP both voted to begin negotiations for a Jamaica coalition. The Greens followed on 23 May. The three presented their coalition agreement on 13 June, and formally signed it on the 27th.

Günther was elected Minister-President by the Landtag on 28 June, winning 42 votes out of 73 cast.

== Composition ==
| Portfolio | Minister | Party | Took office | Left office | State secretaries |
|---|---|---|---|---|---|
| Minister-President; State Chancellery | Daniel Günther born 24 July 1973 | CDU | 28 June 2017 | 28 June 2022 | Dirk Schrödter (Head of the State Chancellery); Sandra Gerken (Representative to the Federal Government) |
| First Deputy Minister-President | Monika Heinold born 30 December 1958 | GRÜNE | 6 February 2018 | 28 June 2022 | Udo Philipp (Tax); Silke Torp (State Budget) |
| Minister for Finance | Monika Heinold born 30 December 1958 | GRÜNE | 28 June 2017 | 28 June 2022 | Udo Philipp (Tax); Silke Torp (State Budget) |
| Acting Minister for Energy Transition, Agriculture, Environment, Nature and Digitalisation | Monika Heinold born 30 December 1958 | GRÜNE | 2 June 2022 | 28 June 2022 | Dorit Kuhnt (Agriculture and Nature); Tobias Goldschmidt (Energy Transition, Environment and Digitalisation) |
| Second Deputy Minister-President Minister for Social Affairs, Health, Youth, Family and Seniors | Heiner Garg born 6 February 1966 | FDP | 28 June 2017 | 28 June 2022 | Matthias Badenhop |
| Minister for Interior, Rural Areas, Integration and Equality | Sabine Sütterlin-Waack born 15 February 1958 | CDU | 29 April 2020 | 28 June 2022 | Torsten Geerdts (Integration and Police); Kristina Herbst (Until 07 June 2022: Rural Areas) |
| Minister for Justice, Europe, Consumer Protection and Equality | Sabine Sütterlin-Waack born 15 February 1958 | CDU | 28 June 2017 | 29 April 2020 | Wilfried Hoops |
| Minister for Justice, Europe and Consumer Protection | Claus Christian Claussen born 26 March 1961 | CDU | 4 May 2020 | 28 June 2022 | Wilfried Hoops |
| Minister for Education, Science and Culture | Karin Prien born 26 June 1965 | CDU | 28 June 2017 | 28 June 2022 | Oliver Grundei (Science and Culture); Dorit Stenke (Education) |
| Minister for Interior, Rural Areas and Integration | Hans-Joachim Grote born 30 April 1955 | CDU | 28 June 2017 | 28 April 2020 | Torsten Geerdts (Integration and Police); Kristina Herbst (Rural Areas) |
| Minister for Energy Transition, Agriculture, Environment, Nature and Digitalisation | Jan Philipp Albrecht born 20 December 1982 | GRÜNE | 1 September 2018 | 2 June 2022 | Dorit Kuhnt (Agriculture and Nature); Tobias Goldschmidt (Energy Transition, Environment and Digitalisation) |
| First Deputy Minister-President | Robert Habeck born 2 September 1969 | GRÜNE | 28 June 2017 | 6 February 2018 | Anke Erdmann (Agriculture and Nature); Tobias Goldschmidt (Energy Transition, Environment and Digitalisation) |
| Minister for Energy Transition, Agriculture, Environment, Nature and Digitalisation | Robert Habeck born 2 September 1969 | GRÜNE | 28 June 2017 | 31 August 2018 | Anke Erdmann (Agriculture and Nature); Tobias Goldschmidt (Energy Transition, Environment and Digitalisation) |
| Minister for Economics, Transport, Labour, Technology and Tourism | Bernd Buchholz born 2 November 1961 | FDP | 28 June 2017 | 28 June 2022 | Thilo Rohlfs |
