= Magdalena Finke =

German politician (born 1986)

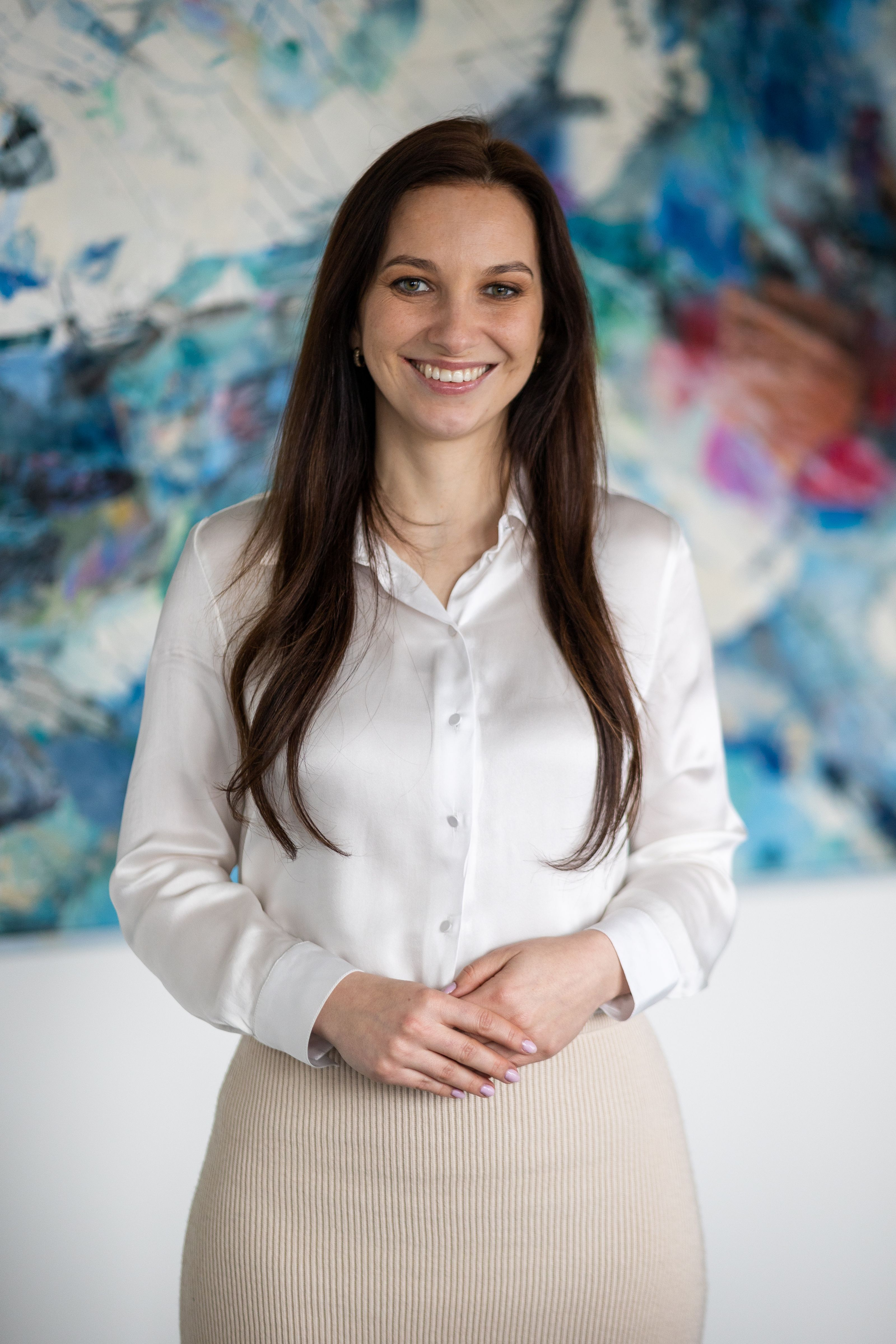
- Finke in 2023

Minister of the Interior, Municipal Affairs, Housing and Sports of Schleswig-Holstein
- Incumbent
- Assumed office 12 November 2025
- Minister-President: Daniel Günther
- Preceded by: Sabine Sütterlin-Waack

Personal details
- Born: 13 November 1986 (age 39)
- Party: Christian Democratic Union

Magdalena Finke (born 13 November 1986) is a German politician serving as minister of the interior, municipal affairs, housing and sports of Schleswig-Holstein since 2025. From 2022 to 2025, she served as state secretary of the interior, municipal affairs, housing and sports.
