= Jörg Nobis =

German politician (born 1975)

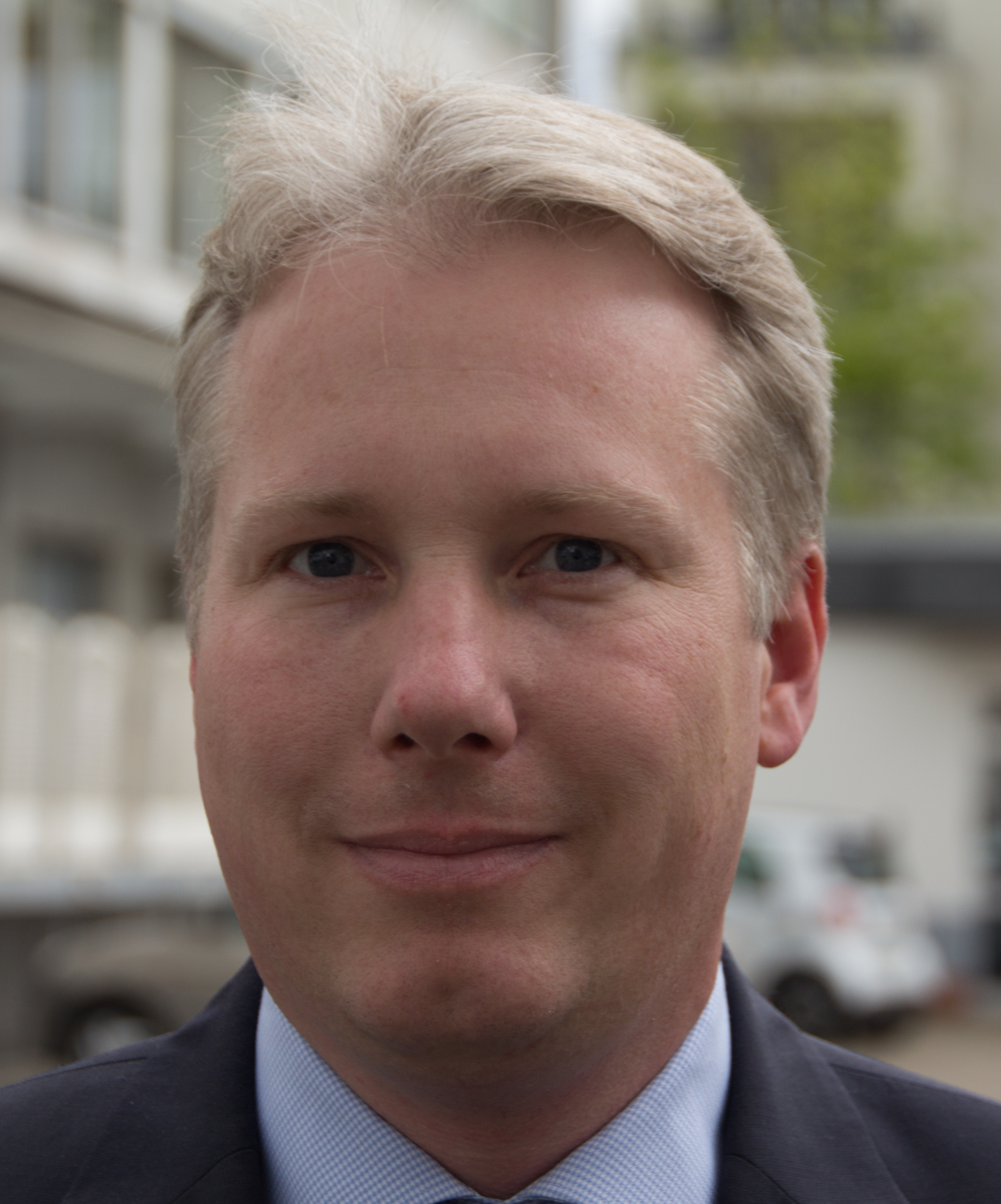
Jörg Nobis in 2017.

Jörg Nobis (born 9 September 1975) is a German politician from Alternative for Germany who was his party's lead candidate in the 2022 Schleswig-Holstein state election. In the election he lost his seat.

== Political career ==
Nobis was a candidate in Segeberg – Stormarn-Mitte at the 2013 German federal election.

He was elected to the Landtag of Schleswig-Holstein in the 2017 Schleswig-Holstein state election.
