= Aminata Touré (German politician) =

German politician (born 1992)

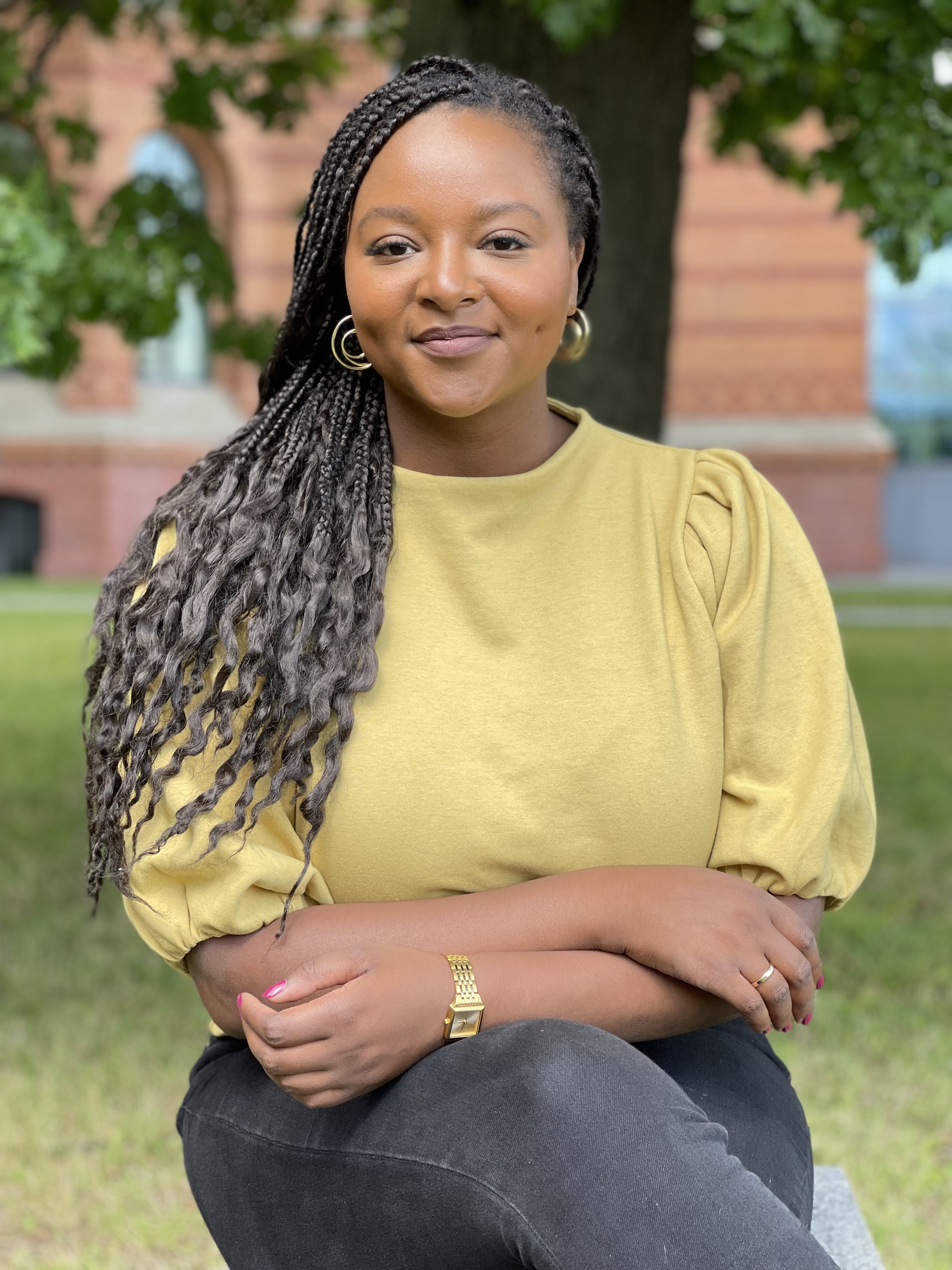
- Touré in 2021

Deputy Minister-President of Schleswig-Holstein
- Incumbent
- Assumed office 1 August 2024
- President: Daniel Günther
- Preceded by: Monika Heinold

Minister for Social Affairs, Youth, Family, Seniors, Integration and Equality of Schleswig-Holstein
- Incumbent
- Assumed office 29 June 2022
- President: Daniel Günther
- Preceded by: Heiner Garg

Vice President of the Landtag of Schleswig-Holstein
- In office 28 August 2019 – 7 June 2022
- President: Klaus Schlie

Member of the Landtag of Schleswig-Holstein
- Incumbent
- Assumed office 29 June 2017
- Constituency: Plön – Neumünster

Personal details
- Born: 15 November 1992 (age 33) Neumünster, Schleswig-Holstein, Germany
- Citizenship: Germany
- Party: Alliance 90/The Greens (since 2012)
- Education: University of Kiel
- Website: aminata-toure.de

Aminata Touré (born 15 November 1992) is a German politician of Alliance 90/The Greens, the German green party, who has been serving as Deputy Minister-President since 1 August 2024 and Minister of Social Affairs, Youth, Family, Senior Citizens, Integration and Equality of the State of Schleswig-Holstein since 29 June 2022. She was elected on 29 June 2017, at the age of 25, to the State Parliament of Schleswig-Holstein and served as the parliament's vice-president until 2022.

== Early life and education ==
Touré's parents fled to Germany from Mali following the 1991 Malian coup d'état. She was born in Neumünster. Following her Abitur, she studied political science and French at the University of Kiel, earning her bachelor degree in 2016. She studied abroad for a semester in 2013–14 at the Complutense University of Madrid. From 2014 to 2017, she worked for the member of parliament Luise Amtsberg in Berlin.

== Career ==
In 2012, Touré joined the Kiel Green Youth, and was elected as its speaker in 2013. In 2016, she was elected as an assessor in her state's green party, an office she held until her election to the State Parliament of Schleswig-Holstein in 2017.

Touré was a candidate for the Schleswig-Holstein Green Youth in the 2017 Schleswig-Holstein state election and was number 11 on the party's electoral list. She also simultaneously ran for the single-seat constituency of Neumünster. Touré did not enter the State Parliament following the election, as the Green Party only received ten seats; Touré later filled the seat vacated by Monika Heinold, who was named Minister of Finance of Schleswig-Holstein. Within her parliamentary group, she served as the spokesperson for Migration, Women & Equality, Children & Youth, LGBT Issues, and Anti-Racism.

Upon Rasmus Andresen's departure for the European Parliament in June 2019, Touré was elected by the coalition to succeed him as vice-president of the State Parliament on 28 August 2019. She was the first Afro-German, as well as the youngest, vice president of a parliament in one of Germany's federal states.

In the negotiations to form a coalition government between the SPD, the Green Party and Free Democratic Party (FDP) following the 2021 federal elections, Touré was part of her party's delegation in the working group on equality, co-chaired by Petra Köpping, Ricarda Lang and Herbert Mertin.

Touré was nominated by her party as delegate to the Federal Convention for the purpose of electing the President of Germany in 2022.

After the 2022 Schleswig-Holstein state election, Touré's party, Alliance 90/The Greens entered into a coalition government with the CDU under Minister-President Daniel Günther (CDU). Touré was appointed on 29 June 2022 as State Minister of Social Affairs, Youth, Family, Senior Citizens, Integration and Equality in the Second Günther cabinet, replacing Heiner Garg (FDP). In this capacity, she is also one of her state's representatives on the Bundesrat, where she has been a member of the Committee on Labour, Integration and Social Policy, the Committee on Family and Senior Citizen Affairs and the Committee on Family and Senior Citizen Affairs.

In June 2024, Deputy Minister-President and Minister of Finance Monika Heinold announced her resignation from the Second Günther Cabinet. Touré was designated as her successor as Deputy Minister-President.

== Other activities ==
- Stiftung Lesen, Member of the Board of Trustees (since 2022)

== In popular culture ==
Touré was featured on the cover of fashion magazine Vogue Germany in December 2022. She is the first minister or politician to appear on the cover of Vogue in Germany.
