= Jan Philipp Albrecht =

German politician (born 1982)

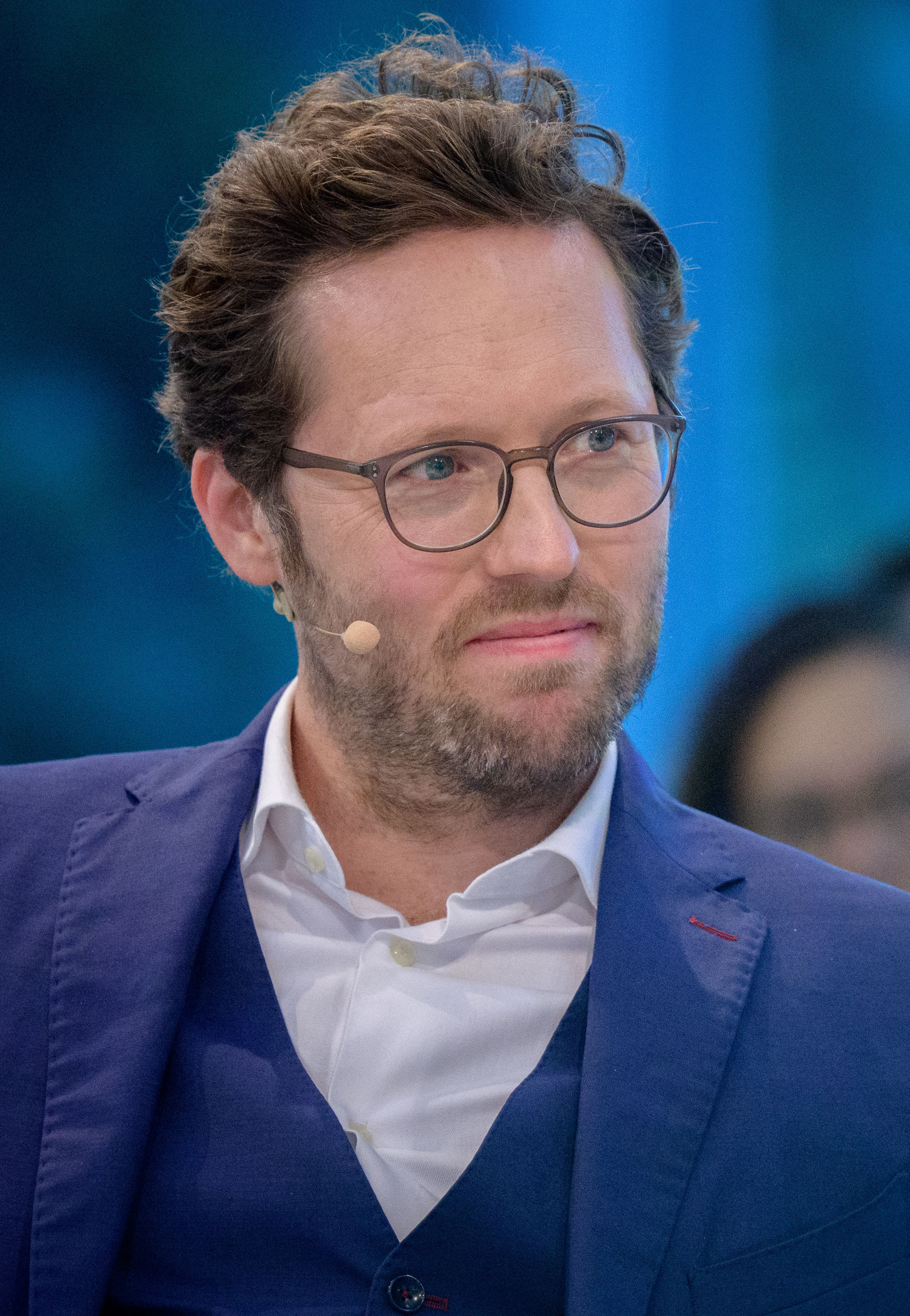

Member of the European Parliament
- In office 1 July 2009 – 2 July 2018
- Constituency: Germany

Minister for Energy, Agriculture, the Environment, Nature and Digitalization
- In office 1 September 2018 – 2 June 2022
- Preceded by: Robert Habeck
- Succeeded by: Monika Heinold

Personal details
- Born: 20 December 1982 (age 43) Braunschweig, Germany
- Party: German: Alliance '90/The Greens; EU: The Greens–European Free Alliance
- Education: Humboldt-University
- Website: janalbrecht.eu

Jan Philipp Albrecht (born 20 December 1982) is a German politician of the Alliance '90/The Greens, part of The Greens-European Free Alliance. From 2018 to 2022, he served as Minister for Energy, Agriculture, the Environment, Nature and Digitalization of Schleswig-Holstein. From 2009 until 2018, he was a Member of the European Parliament. He is specialized in the field of civil rights, data protection and democracy.

== Early life and education ==
Albrecht was born in Braunschweig. He studied law in Bremen, Brussels and Berlin and worked for the Walter Hallstein Institute for European Constitutional Law in Berlin. He graduated in information and communications technology law from Leibniz University Hannover and from the University of Oslo.

== Political career ==
Albrecht was spokesman of the Green Youth in Germany from 2006 to 2008. He joined the German Green Party in 1999 and held various posts at local, regional and federal level. He led working groups and pressed political campaigns especially in the fields of civil liberties, legal affairs and constitutional issues. Albrecht became an anti-nuclear activist very early in his career, prompted by the problems with a nuclear waste storage facility in his home town, and has taken part in demonstrations against the transport of nuclear waste in his region. He later explained that these experiences provoked his commitment to civil liberties and democracy, in particular with regards to new technologies. His commitment to data protection and other issues of civil rights in the digital age have become a defining point in his political career.

=== Member of the European Parliament, 2009–2018 ===
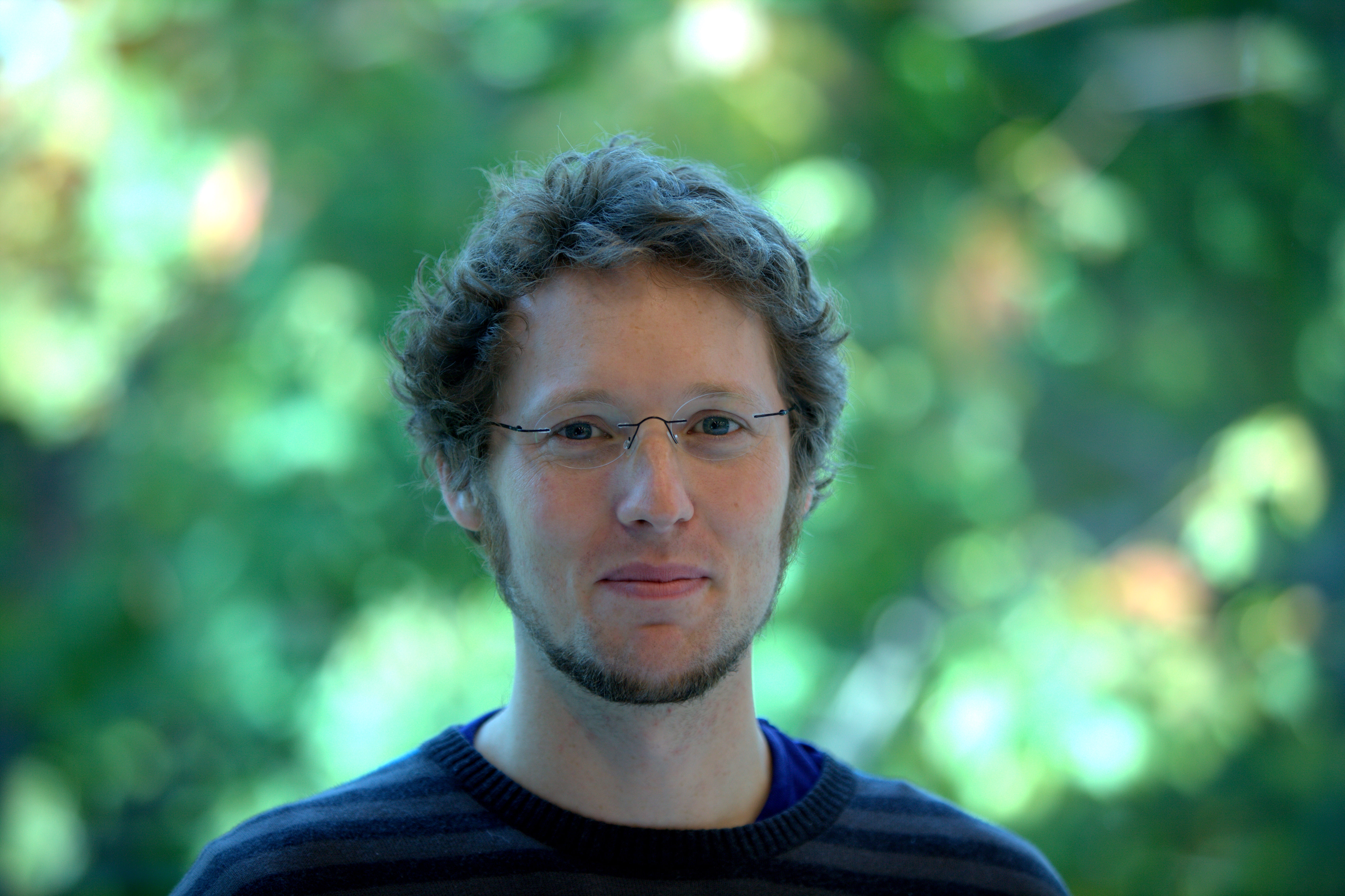
Albrecht in 2013

In the 2009 elections, Albrecht was elected for the Greens to the European Parliament. He became a member of the LIBE committee and substitute member of the JURI committee (2009–14) and later on of the IMCO committee (since 2014) in the European Parliament. He worked especially on home affairs, data protection and police and justice cooperation and represents the region of Northern Germany. Albrecht was also a member of the Delegation of the European Parliament to Israel.

In addition to his committee assignments, Albrecht was a member of the European Parliament Intergroup on Integrity (Transparency, Anti-Corruption and Organized Crime) and the European Parliament Intergroup on the Digital Agenda.

Following his re-election in 2014, supported by his party by a historically high nomination result of 97.38%, Albrecht was appointed Vice Chair of the LIBE committee. In this capacity, he led an important delegation of the European Parliament to the U.S. Congress in spring 2015 on the issue of Mass surveillance, privacy and data protection.

=== State Minister in Schleswig-Holstein, 2018–2022 ===
In March 2018, Albrecht was appointed the successor of Robert Habeck, who concurrently holds the position of chairman of the Green Party, as State Minister for Energy, Agriculture, Environment and Digitization in the government of Minister-President Daniel Günther. As one of the state's representatives at the Bundesrat, he is also a member of the Committee on Agricultural Policy and Consumer Protection; the Committee on the Environment, Nature Conservation and Nuclear Safety; the Committee on Economic Affairs; and the Committee on Transport.

In the negotiations to form a so-called traffic light coalition of the Social Democratic Party (SPD), the Green Party and the Free Democratic Party (FDP) following the 2021 German elections, Albrecht was part of his party's delegation in the working group on digital innovation and infrastructure, co-chaired by Jens Zimmermann, Malte Spitz and Andreas Pinkwart.

Albrecht resigned his Post as Minister effective on 2 June 2022 to join the Heinrich Böll Foundation, with Monika Heinold succeeding him as Acting Minister.

== Political positions ==
=== On privacy and data protection ===
Albrecht aims to strengthen civil liberties in the digital age. He is well known for his expertise in privacy and data protection laws and is the rapporteur of the European Parliament for the EU's General Data Protection Regulation as well as for the EU-US data protection framework agreement. Albrecht has also been active in the decision-making process of the so-called SWIFT-agreement in the European Parliament, which was intended to give US authorities access to European bank data transferred via SWIFT for their terrorist finance tracking program (TFTP).

Albrecht is generally opposed to the lowering of judicial standards in the protection of fundamental rights for the purpose of security or law enforcement. In January 2013, Albrecht introduced a bill proposing to create a new agency to enforce a series of measures giving Internet users greater control of their online information. If approved, the proposal would have replaced the Article 29 Working Party, an advisory panel to the European Commission, with a regulator with the power to make decisions for the EU member states and levy fines of up to 2 percent of a company's revenue.

In October 2013 Albrecht's proposal for the EU's General Data Protection Regulation (GDPR) was adopted by the European Parliament's Committee on Civil Liberties, Justice and Home Affairs with a broad majority of all political groups. Since then Albrecht has drawn worldwide attention for his commitment to privacy and data protection standards. Albrecht was also leading the negotiations between the European Parliament and the Council of Ministers on the adoption of the regulation. After a deal was found in December 2015 and adopted by Council and Parliament in April 2016, Albrecht became known as the father of the GDPR which will get into application in May/June 2018 everywhere on the EU market as the directly applicable data protection law replacing the existing provisions of the 28 member states.

Albrecht filed an amicus brief supporting Microsoft in Microsoft Corporation v. United States of America.

Albrecht was rapporteur of the LIBE committee on the envisaged trade deals TTIP and TiSA where he demands a horizontal clause to except privacy and data protection rules on the basis of Article XIV of the GATS treaty. He is also rapporteur for the EU-US umbrella agreement on data protection in the area of law enforcement cooperation.

=== On mass surveillance ===
Since the revelations by Edward Snowden, Albrecht has pressed for a response by governments and parliaments on the mass surveillance of citizens. On his request, the European Parliament began investigations on the intelligence programs PRISM and Tempora in summer 2013. In December 2013, Albrecht arranged with Snowden's lawyers for the international fugitive to give testimony through a pre-recorded video, responding to question submitted in advance by MEPs.

== Other activities ==
=== Corporate boards ===
- Deutsche Telekom, Member of the Data Privacy Advisory Board

=== Non-profit organizations ===
- Heinrich Böll Foundation, Member of the General Assembly
- Institut Solidarische Moderne (ISM), Member (since 2010)
- NOYB – European Center for Digital Rights, Member
- University of Vienna, Visiting Lecturer (since 2010)
- FC St. Pauli, Member
