= Silke Schneider =

German Politician and Judge

Dr. Silke Schneider
- Constituency: Schleswig-Holstein

Minister of Finance for Schleswig-Holstein
- Incumbent
- Assumed office 1 August 2024
- Preceded by: Monika Heinold

Personal details
- Party: Alliance 90/The Greens Alliance 90/The Greens
- Education: Free University of Berlin
- Profession: Judge

Silke Schneider (born 1967 in Cologne) is a German politician of Alliance 90/The Greens. She currently serves as the Minister of Finance for Schleswig-Holstein.

== Biography ==
Dr. Silke Schneider studied jurisprudence in Cologne and Hamburg. In 1997, she became a judge at the Amtsgericht in Lübeck. Between 2008 and 2011, Schneider acted as the Equality Commissioner in the Ministry of Justice for Schleswig-Holstein. From 2009 to 2014, she was the director of the Amtsgericht Bad Segeberg.

In 2014, Schneider joined the Schleswig-Holstein state government as Secretary of State for Agriculture, Environment, and Rural Areas under Torsten Albig’s administration. She continued her political career as Secretary of State in the Finance Ministry during Daniel Günther’s administration from 2017 to 2020. After stepping down, Schneider served as the President of the Landgericht in Lübeck starting in 2020 and joined the Schleswig-Holstein Constitutional Court in 2021.

On August 1, 2024, Dr. Schneider was appointed the Finance Minister of Schleswig-Holstein, succeeding Monika Heinold. She subsequently stepped down as President of the Landgericht in Lübeck and member of the Schleswig-Holstein Constitutional Court.

== Private life ==
Silke Schneider is the mother of six children from two marriages. She was previously married to Hartmut Schneider, former vice president of the Landgericht in Lübeck.
