= Tobias von der Heide =

German politician (born 1984)

Member of the Landtag of Schleswig-Holstein
- In office 6 June 2017 – 30 June 2022
- Succeeded by: Cornelia Schmachtenberg

Personal details
- Born: 18 August 1984 (age 41) Neustadt in Holstein
- Party: Christian Democratic Union (since 2000)

Tobias von der Heide (born 18 August 1984 in Neustadt in Holstein) is a German politician serving as state secretary of education, science, research and culture of Schleswig-Holstein since 2025. From 2022 to 2025, he served as state secretary of economic affairs, transport, labour, technology and tourism. From 2017 to 2022, he was a member of the Landtag of Schleswig-Holstein.
