= Uwe Barschel =

German politician (1944–1987)

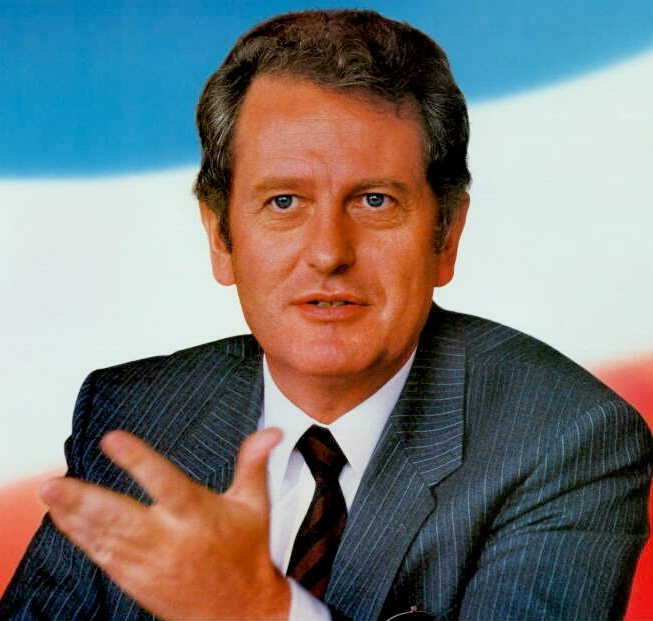
- Barschel on a 1987 campaign poster

Minister-President of Schleswig-Holstein
- In office 14 October 1982 – 2 October 1987
- Deputy: Henning Schwarz
- Preceded by: Gerhard Stoltenberg
- Succeeded by: Henning Schwarz (interim)
Schleswig-Holstein Cabinet
Minister of the Interior
In office 1 July 1979 – 4 October 1982
Minister-President	Gerhard Stoltenberg
Preceded by	Rudolf Titzck
Succeeded by	Karl Eduard Claussen
Minister of Finance
In office 1 January 1979 – 30 June 1979
Minister-President	Gerhard Stoltenberg
Preceded by	Gerd Lausen
Succeeded by	Rudolf Titzck
Landtag career
Leader of the Christian Democratic Union in the Landtag of Schleswig-Holstein
In office 15 May 1973 – 8 January 1979
Preceded by	Gerd Lausen
Succeeded by	Heiko Hoffmann
Member of the Landtag of Schleswig-Holstein for Lauenburg-Süd
In office 24 May 1971 – 11 October 1987
Preceded by	Paul Rohloff
Succeeded by	Frank Millack

Personal details
- Born: Uwe Ulrich Barschel; 13 May 1944 Glienicke/Nordbahn, Province of Brandenburg, Free State of Prussia, Nazi Germany (now Brandenburg, Germany)
- Died: 11 October 1987 (aged 43) Beau-Rivage, Geneva, Switzerland
- Cause of death: Drug overdose
- Resting place: Mölln
- Party: Christian Democratic Union (1962–1987)
- Spouse: Freya Barschel (m. 1973)
- Children: 4
- Education: University of Kiel
- Occupation: Politician; Notary; Lawyer
- Cabinet: Stoltenberg II, Stoltenberg III, Barschel I, Barschel II

Uwe Barschel (13 May 1944 – 11 October 1987) was a German politician of the Christian Democratic Union (CDU) who served as Minister-President of Schleswig-Holstein from 1982 to 1987.

Barschel resigned as Minister-President shortly after he became embroiled in a scandal known as Waterkantgate for alleged spying on his Social Democrat rival during the 1987 state election. On 11 October 1987, nine days after his resignation, Barschel was found dead under mysterious circumstances at the Hotel Beau-Rivage in Geneva, Switzerland. While a police investigation concluded that Barschel had committed suicide, the circumstances of his death remain controversial.

Barschel, having assumed office of Minister-President at the age of 38 and died at 43, is to date the youngest head of government of a federal state in Germany and the youngest former Minister-President to die.

== Early life ==
In 1963, Barschel was among a group of Geesthacht students who attended a school assembly which featured former admiral and convicted war criminal Karl Dönitz, speaking at the invitation of a pro-Nazi history teacher. The event, during which Dönitz gave an apologia for Nazi ideology with no rebuttal from students and staff, caused a furore when it was reported by the West German and international press.

Barschel studied public law, economics, political science and education at the University of Kiel. Upon graduating in 1971, he was admitted to the bar and began working as a lawyer and notary. In addition to his legal and political activities, Barschel also developed an interest in science. He was reportedly preparing to withdraw from politics in the middle of the 1987 legislative session, and had almost completed his habilitation thesis at the time of his death.

== Political career ==
On 31 May 1987, shortly before the start of the 1987 state election campaign, a plane carrying Barschel and his bodyguard crashed on approach at Lübeck Airport. Both of the pilots, Elisabeth Friske and Michael Heise, were killed in the crash, and Barschel's bodyguard succumbed to his injuries at hospital a few days later.

== Controversy ==
On 13 September 1987, the day before the election, the magazine Der Spiegel reported an account by Reiner Pfeiffer, Barschel's media adviser, that Barschel had ordered him to spy on the SPD's top candidate, Björn Engholm, with the aim of embarking on a smear campaign implicating Engholm in tax evasion. Pfeiffer further claimed to have been ordered to install a bugging device in Barschel's phone and accuse the SPD of being the perpetrators. The subsequent scandal became known as the "Barschel affair" or "Waterkant-Gate" (an allusion to the Watergate scandal, with Waterkant (from Low German "waterside").

== Death ==
Barschel's autopsy uncovered a total of eight drugs in his system, including the sedatives lorazepam, diazepam, diphenhydramine, and perazine, along with the barbiturate cyclobarbitone and the sleep aid pyrithyldione. The Geneva prosecutor determined that Barschel's death was self-inflicted, and that he overdosed on these medications before stepping into the bath. This method of suicide corresponded with a guide published by a German right to die advocacy group. However, Barschel's widow and four children did not agree with this interpretation of the facts and were convinced that he was actually murdered.

=== Alternative theories around Barschel's death ===
Various mysteries around Barschel's death are discussed in a January 1995 Washington Post article based on German, Spanish and Swiss police investigations of the murder, and the possible motives for it. The article reported that the Barschel case had been reopened as a murder investigation because of evidence of third-party involvement.

== 2011 Barschel case review ==
On 12 June 2011, the Public Prosecution Department of Lübeck announced that the Barschel case would be re-opened and re-examined, with more sophisticated techniques such as DNA profiling being employed to find out the actual circumstances of the politician's demise.

== See also ==
- List of unsolved deaths
