= Cornelia Schmachtenberg =

German politician (born 1991)

Minister of Agriculture, Rural Areas, European Affairs and Consumer Protection of Schleswig-Holstein
- Incumbent
- Assumed office 12 November 2025
- Minister-President: Daniel Günther
- Preceded by: Werner Schwarz

Personal details
- Born: 17 February 1991 (age 35)
- Party: Christian Democratic Union

Cornelia Schmachtenberg (born 17 February 1991) is a German politician serving as minister of agriculture, rural areas, European affairs and consumer protection of Schleswig-Holstein since 2025. She has been a member of the Landtag of Schleswig-Holstein since 2022.
