= Sabine Sütterlin-Waack =

German lawyer and politician

Dr. Sabine Sütterlin-Waack
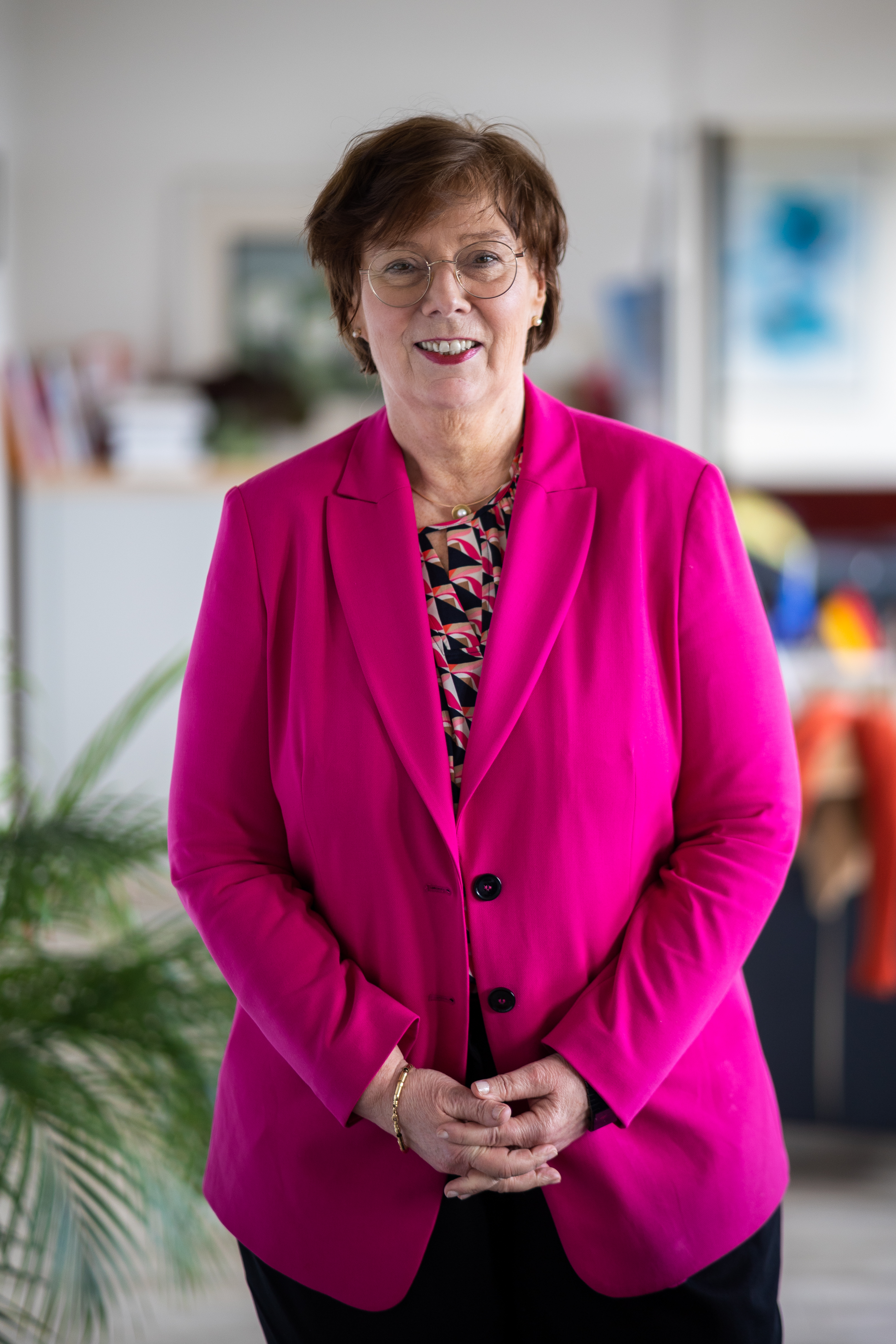

Schleswig-Holstein Minister of the Interior, Municipal Affairs, Housing and Sports
- Incumbent
- Assumed office 2020
- Until 30 June 2022: Ministry of the Interior, Rural Areas, Integration and Equality
- Preceded by: Hans-Joachim Grote

Schleswig-Holstein Minister of Justice, Europe, Consumer Protection and Gender Equality
- In office 28.06.2017–29.04.2020
- Preceded by: Anke Spoorendonk
- Succeeded by: Claus Christian Claussen

Personal details
- Born: Schwarz; 15 February 1958 (age 68) Reinbek, West Germany (now Germany)
- Citizenship: German
- Party: CDU Christian Democratic Union of Germany (CDU)
- Education: University of Göttingen; University of Kiel
- Occupation: Lawyer
- Cabinet: Cabinet Günther I; Cabinet Günther II

Sabine Sütterlin-Waack (born 15 February 1958, in Reinbek as Sabine Schwarz) is a German lawyer and politician of the Christian Democratic Union (CDU). She currently serves as State Minister of the Interior, Municipal Affairs, Housing and Sports in the State of Schleswig-Holstein.

== Early life and career ==
Sabine Sütterlin-Waack comes from a Schleswig-Holstein politician family. Her father was the longtime state minister Henning Schwarz (1928-1993), who was also acting Minister-President in 1987/88; her grandfather Werner Schwarz (1900-1982) was a Member of Parliament and from 1959 to 1965 Federal Minister of Agriculture. She is married for the second time and has two sons from her first marriage.

Due to her parents moving frequently, Sütterlin-Waack attended schools in Ahrensburg and Preetz, before she graduated in 1977 from the Emil-von-Behring-Gymnasium in Großhansdorf. From 1977 to 1979 she trained as a retail clerk at the then Karstadt AG, then studied law at the University of Göttingen and at the University of Lausanne. She then attended Christian Albrechts University in Kiel in 1986 and completed the first Staatsexamen (state examination). She completed the second Staatsexamen at the Judicial Examination Office in Hamburg in 1989. In 1990 she wrote her doctoral thesis on "The Day of German Unity Through the Ages."

From 1990 to 1993 Sütterlin-Waack worked as a research assistant to the CDU parliamentary group in Hesse. In 1994 she joined a law firm in Schleswig as a lawyer.

== Political career ==
Sütterlin-Waack joined the CDU in 1976. From 1992 to 1994 she worked as deputy local chairman of the CDU in Budenheim(Rhineland-Palatinate) and, after her move to Schleswig-Holstein in 2004, became deputy chairman of the CDU local association Schuby/Lürschau. Since 2009, she is chairwoman of the CDU-Amtsverband Arensharde. At the state party convention of the CDU on 19 November 2016, Sütterlin-Waack was elected deputy state chairman of the CDU Schleswig-Holstein.

From 1994 to 2002, Sütterlin-Waack also volunteered for the school parish council of the elementary and secondary school Schuby.

=== Career in local politics, 2003–2013 ===
In the municipal elections in Schleswig-Holstein in 2003, Sütterlin-Waack was elected as a community representative in Lürschau and vice-mayor there. As such she was a member of the Bureau of the Amt Schuby and chairwoman of the local School and Culture Committee. In the Schleswig-Holstein local elections of 2008, she was elected in the district council of Schleswig-Flensburg. From 2009 to 2013, she was Deputy CDU Parliamentary Group Leader and, from 2011 to 2013, Chairwoman of the Main Committee. In September 2013, she was elected to the Bundestag and resigned from the municipal offices that she had been re-elected to in May of the same year.

From 2011 until her entry into the Bundestag, Sütterlin-Waack was also honorary mayor of the municipality of Lüschau.

=== Member of the Bundestag, 2013–2017 ===
Sütterlin-Waack was nominated as a candidate for the federal elections on 5 February 2013 after the original candidate, Jost de Jager, had resigned. She was nominated with 224 out of 231 votes.

In the 2013 general election, Sütterlin-Waack won the direct mandate with 42.5 percent of the direct votes and thus moved into the 18th Bundestag. She was a member of the Committee on Legal Affairs and Consumer Protection, where she served as her parliamentary group's rapporteur on family law.

In November 2016, Sütterlin-Waack was elected one of the four deputy state chairmen of the CDU Schleswig-Holstein. In November 2018 she no longer took up this post; she was succeeded by State Minister of Education Karin Prien.

=== Career in state politics ===
After the victory of the CDU in the 2017 Schleswig-Holstein state election, Sütterlin-Waack was appointed Minister of Justice, Europe, Consumer Protection and Gender Equality in the government of Minister-President Daniel Günther on 28 June 2017 and resigned from the Bundestag. Her successor there was Thomas Jepsen.

In 2020, Sütterlin-Waack was appointed State Minister of the Interior, Rural Areas, and Integration. After assuming office, the Ministries name was changed to "Ministry of the Interior, Rural Areas, Integration and Equality".

As one of the state's representatives at the Bundesrat, Sütterlin-Waack is a member of the Committee on Legal Affairs; the Committee on European Affairs; the Committee on Women and Youth; and the Committee on Agricultural Policy and Consumer Protection. She is also a member of the German-Russian Friendship Group set up by the Bundesrat and the Russian Federation Council.

Sütterlin-Waack was nominated by her party as delegate to the Federal Convention for the purpose of electing the President of Germany in 2022.

Sütterlin-Waack joined Daniel Günther's second cabinet on 29 June 2022 as Minister of the Interior, Municipal Affairs, Housing and Sports.

== Political positions ==
In June 2017, Sütterlin-Waack voted against her parliamentary group's majority and in favour of Germany's introduction of same-sex marriage.
