= Joschka Knuth =

German politician (born 1993)

Member of the Landtag of Schleswig-Holstein
- In office 1 July 2019 – 30 June 2022
- Preceded by: Rasmus Andresen
- Succeeded by: Bettina Braun

Personal details
- Born: 24 May 1993 (age 33)
- Party: Alliance 90/The Greens

Joschka Knuth (born 24 May 1993) is a German politician serving as state secretary of the environment of Schleswig-Holstein since 2022. From 2019 to 2022, he was a member of the Landtag of Schleswig-Holstein.
