= Monika Heinold =

German politician (born 1958)

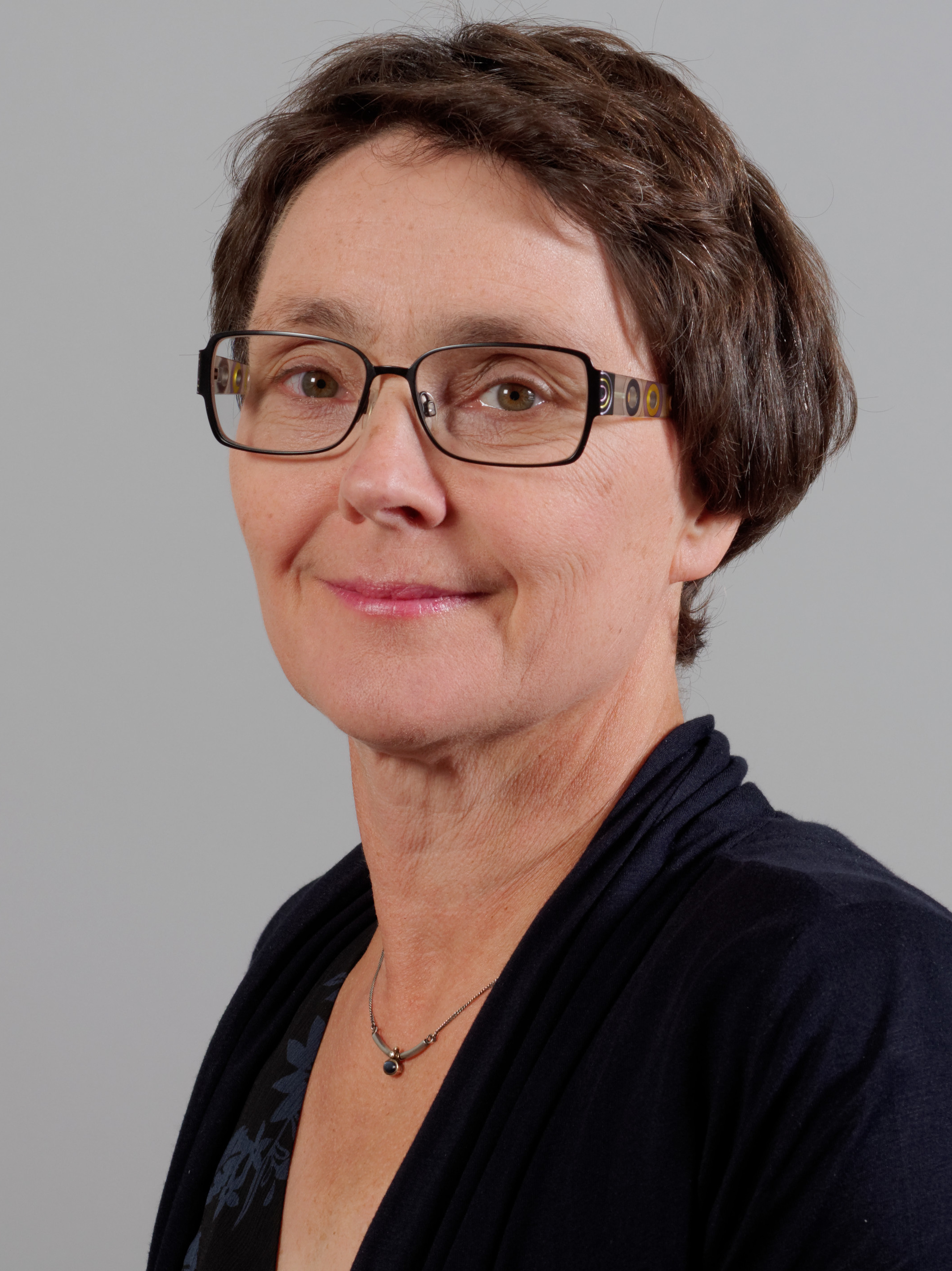

Deputy Minister-President of Schleswig-Holstein
- In office 6 February 2018 – 1 August 2024 Serving with Heiner Garg Until 29 June 2022
- Preceded by: Robert Habeck
- Succeeded by: Aminata Toure

Minister of Finance of Schleswig-Holstein
- In office 6 May 2012 – 1 August 2024
- Preceded by: Rainer Wiegard
- Succeeded by: Silke Schneider

Member of the Landtag of Schleswig-Holstein
- In office 7 June 2022 – 1 August 2024

Member of the Landtag of Schleswig-Holstein
- In office 24 March 1996 – 6 May 2012

Personal details
- Born: 30 December 1958 (age 67) Gütersloh, West Germany
- Party: Alliance 90/The Greens
- Cabinet: Cabinet Albig; Cabinet Günther; Cabinet Günther II
- Website: www.monika-heinhold.de

Monika Heinold (born 30 December 1958) is a German politician of Alliance 90/The Greens and former Schleswig-Holstein Deputy Minister-President and Minister of Finance.

== Early life and career ==
Heinold grew up in Langenhorn, Hamburg, and began her professional career in day care.

== Political career ==
=== Early beginnings ===
Heinold joined Alliance 90/The Greens in 1984. From 1990 to 1994 she was a member of the regional parliament in her home district of Segeberg.

Heinold was a member of Landtag of Schleswig-Holstein from 1996 to 2012. Throughout her time in parliament, she served on the Finance Committee, which she co-chaired from 2009 until 2012. In addition, she was a member of the Committee on the Election of Judges (1996–2000) and the Committee on Social Affairs (2000–2006).

=== Career in state government ===
Since the 2012 state elections, Heinold has been serving as State Minister of Finance in the cabinets of Ministers-President Torsten Albig (2012–2017) and Daniel Günther (since 2017, Cabinet Günther) of Schleswig-Holstein. As one of the state's representatives at the Bundesrat, she serves on the body's Finance Committee.

In the negotiations to form a so-called traffic light coalition of the Social Democratic Party (SPD), the Green Party and the Free Democratic Party (FDP) following the 2021 national elections, Heinold was part of her party's delegation in the working group on financial regulation and the national budget, co-chaired by Doris Ahnen, Lisa Paus and Christian Dürr.

Heinold was a Green Party delegate to the Federal Convention for the purpose of electing the President of Germany in 2004, 2017 and 2022.

Following the resignation of Jan Philipp Albrecht, Heinold additionally took on his duties as acting Minister of Energy Transition, Agriculture, the Environment, Nature and Digitalisation between 2 June and 29 June 2022.

In June 2024, Heinold announced her resignation from the Second Günther Cabinet. Her Party designated incumbent Minister for Social Affairs, Youth, Family, Seniors, Integration and Equality Aminata Touré as her successor. Silke Schneider was nominated her successor as Minister of Finance.

== Other activities ==
- Stability Council, Ex-Officio Member (2018-2024)
- KfW, Member of the Board of Supervisory Directors (2018-2024)
- HSH Nordbank, Member of the Advisory Board (2004–2005)

== Personal life ==
Heinold has two sons. In 2007, she moved from Segeberg to Kiel.
