= List of minister-presidents of Schleswig-Holstein =

The minister-presidents of Schleswig-Holstein since 1946 have been:

== List ==
Political party: CDU SPD

Portrait	Name (Born–Died)	Term of office			Political party	Cabinet
Portrait	Name (Born–Died)	Took office	Left office	Days	Political party	Cabinet
1	Theodor Steltzer (1885–1967)	12 September 1946	29 April 1947	229 days	CDU	I II
2	Hermann Lüdemann (1880–1959)	29 April 1947	29 August 1949	2 years, 122 days	SPD	I
3	Bruno Diekmann (1897–1982)	29 August 1949	5 September 1950	1 year, 7 days	SPD	I
4	Walter Bartram (1893–1971)	5 September 1950	25 June 1951 resigned	293 days	CDU	I
5	Friedrich-Wilhelm Lübke (1887–1954)	25 June 1951	11 October 1954 resigned	3 years, 108 days	CDU	I
6	Kai-Uwe von Hassel (1913–1997)	11 October 1954	14 January 1963 resigned	8 years, 95 days	CDU	I II
7	Helmut Lemke (1907–1990)	14 January 1963	24 May 1971	8 years, 130 days	CDU	I II
8	Gerhard Stoltenberg (1928–2001)	24 May 1971	14 October 1982 resigned	11 years, 143 days	CDU	I II III
9	Uwe Barschel (1944–1987)	14 October 1982	2 October 1987 resigned	4 years, 353 days	CDU	I II
Deputy Minister-President Henning Schwarz (CDU) served as acting Minister-President from 2 October 1987 to 31 May 1988.
10	Björn Engholm (born 1939)	31 May 1988	19 May 1993 resigned	4 years, 353 days	SPD	I II
11	Heide Simonis (1943–2023)	19 May 1993	27 April 2005	11 years, 343 days	SPD	I II III
12	Peter Harry Carstensen (born 1947)	27 April 2005	12 June 2012	7 years, 46 days	CDU	I II
13	Torsten Albig (born 1963)	12 June 2012	28 June 2017	5 years, 16 days	SPD	I
14	Daniel Günther (born 1973)	28 June 2017	Incumbent	8 years, 311 days	CDU	I II

== See also ==
- Schleswig-Holstein
- List of rulers of Schleswig-Holstein
- Landtag of Schleswig-Holstein
