= Daniel Günther =

German politician (born 1973)

Daniel Günther MdL MdBR S.K.
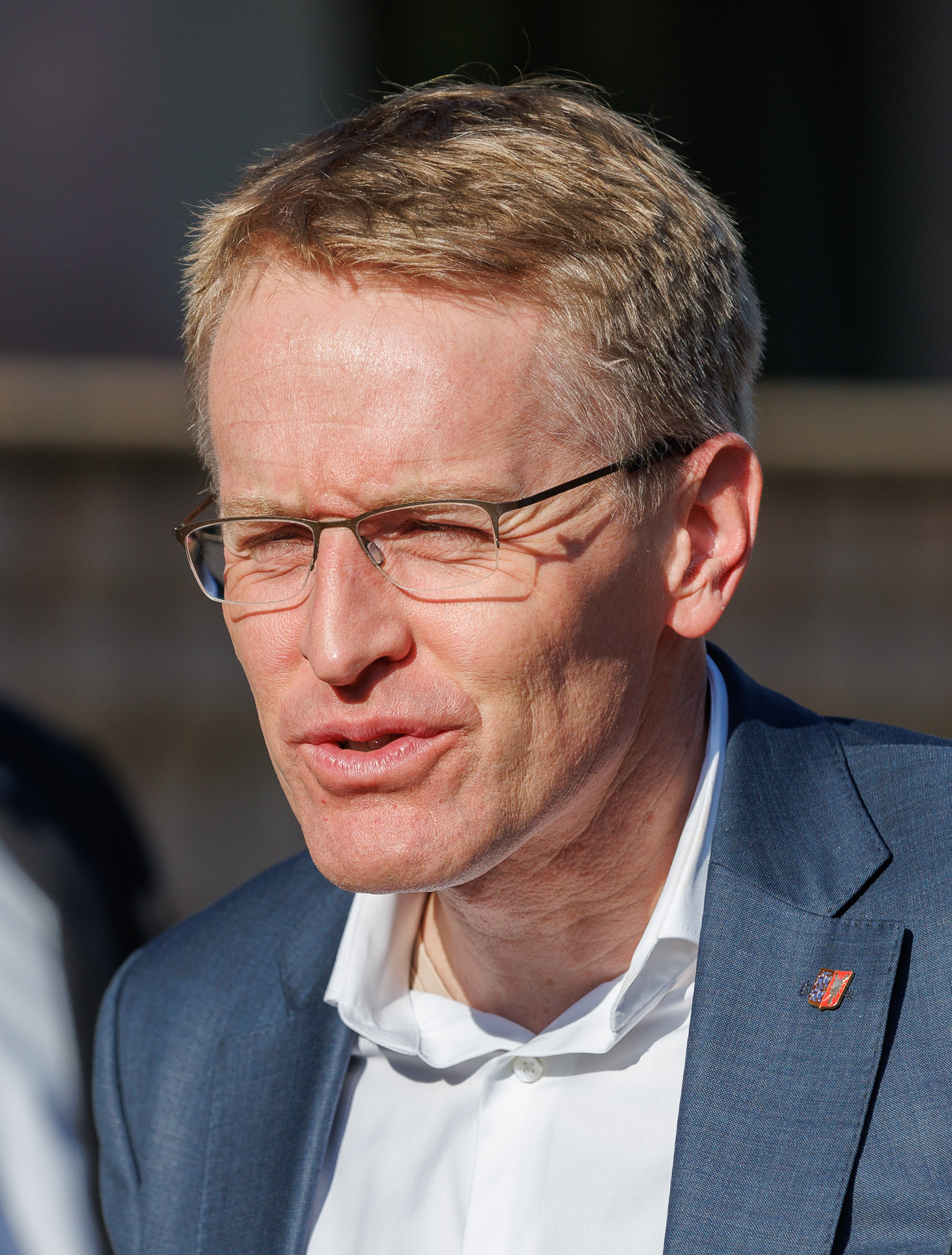
- Günther in 2024

Minister-President of Schleswig-Holstein
- Incumbent
- Assumed office 28 June 2017
- Deputy: Robert Habeck; Monika Heinold; Aminata Toure
- Preceded by: Torsten Albig

President of the Bundesrat
- In office 1 November 2018 – 31 October 2019
- First Vice President: Michael Müller
- Preceded by: Michael Müller
- Succeeded by: Dietmar Woidke

Leader of the Opposition in the Landtag of Schleswig-Holstein
- In office 5 October 2014 – 28 June 2017
- Minister-President: Torsten Albig
- Preceded by: Johannes Callsen
- Succeeded by: Ralf Stegner

Member of the Landtag of Schleswig-Holstein for Eckernförde
- Incumbent
- Assumed office 27 October 2009
- Preceded by: Jost de Jager

Personal details
- Born: 24 July 1973 (age 53) Kiel, Schleswig-Holstein, West Germany (now Germany)
- Party: Christian Democratic Union (since 1994)
- Education: Kiel University
- Occupation: Politician; Party Staffer; Psychologist
- Website: Official Website

Daniel Günther (born 24 July 1973) is a German politician who is a member of the Christian Democratic Union of Germany (CDU). Since 28 June 2017, he has served as the Minister President of Schleswig-Holstein. From 1 November 2018 to 31 October 2019, he served as President of the Bundesrat, being succeeded by Dietmar Woidke.

== Early life and education ==
Günther studied politics and psychology at University of Kiel.

== Career ==
=== Career in state politics ===
Günther has been a member of Landtag of Schleswig-Holstein. since the 2009 state elections. In parliament, he was a member of the Committee on Education (2009–2014) and the Finance Committee (2009–2012). From 2014 until 2017, he served as chairman of the CDU parliamentary group. In this capacity, he was also a member of the Council of Elders.

When Ingbert Liebing resigned in late 2016 from his role as leading candidate for the 2017 state elections after consistently bad polling results, Günther was elected by the party members to lead the party into the election. After assuming the leadership, Günther led the party to a victory with 30.8% of the vote.

=== Minister-President of Schleswig-Holstein, 2017–present ===
Günter first became the Minister-President of Schleswig-Holstein on 28 June 2017. He was his party's lead candidate for the 2022 Schleswig-Holstein State Election in which the party was the lead vote-getter with 43.4%.

As one of the state's representatives at the Bundesrat, Günther also serves on the Committee on Foreign Affairs.

=== Role in national politics ===
Günther was a CDU delegate to the Federal Convention for the purpose of electing the President of Germany in 2017 and 2022. In the – failed – negotiations to form a coalition government with the Christian Social Union in Bavaria (CSU), the Free Democratic Party (FDP) and the Green Party following the 2017 national elections, he was part of the 19-member delegation of the CDU. In the ensuing negotiations with the Social Democrats, he led the working group on transport and infrastructure, this time alongside Thomas Strobl and Sören Bartol.

Together with Bernd Althusmann, Monika Grütters, Michael Kretschmer and Armin Laschet, Günther co-chaired the CDU's national convention in Berlin in February 2018.

== Other activities ==
- Deutsches Museum, Member of the Board of Trustees
- Schleswig-Holstein Musik Festival, Ex-Officio chairman of the board of Trustees (since 2017)
- State Agency for Civic Education, Member of the Board of Trustees (since 2012)
- Stadtwerke Eckernförde, Member of the Supervisory Board (1998–2005)

== Political positions ==
Ahead of the Christian Democrats' leadership election in 2018, Günther publicly endorsed Annegret Kramp-Karrenbauer to succeed Merkel as the party's chair. For the 2021 leadership election, he later endorsed Armin Laschet, and supported him as the Christian Democrats' joint candidate to succeed Chancellor Angela Merkel in the 2021 national elections.

== Personal life ==
Günther is married to a pediatrician. The couple has two daughters.

== See also ==
- List of minister-presidents of Schleswig-Holstein
