= 1988 Schleswig-Holstein state election =

German state election

- 8 May 1988

All 74 seats in the Landtag of Schleswig-Holstein 38 seats needed for a majority
- Turnout: 1,566,837 (77.4%) ▲0.8%
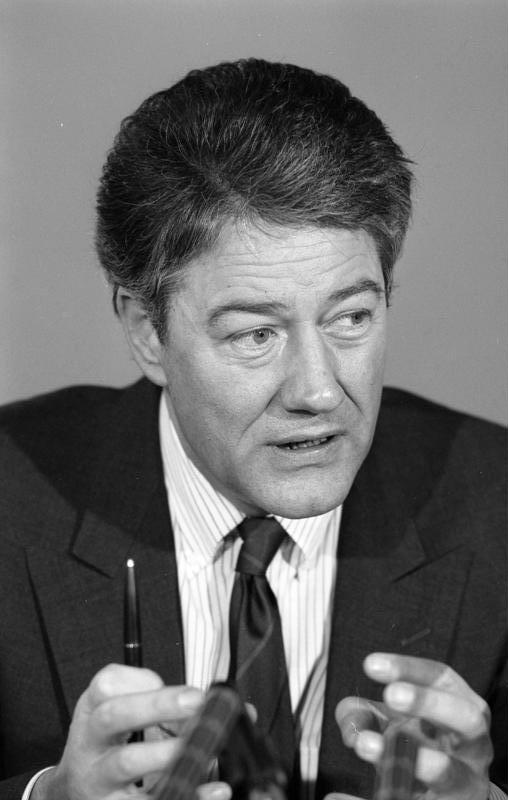

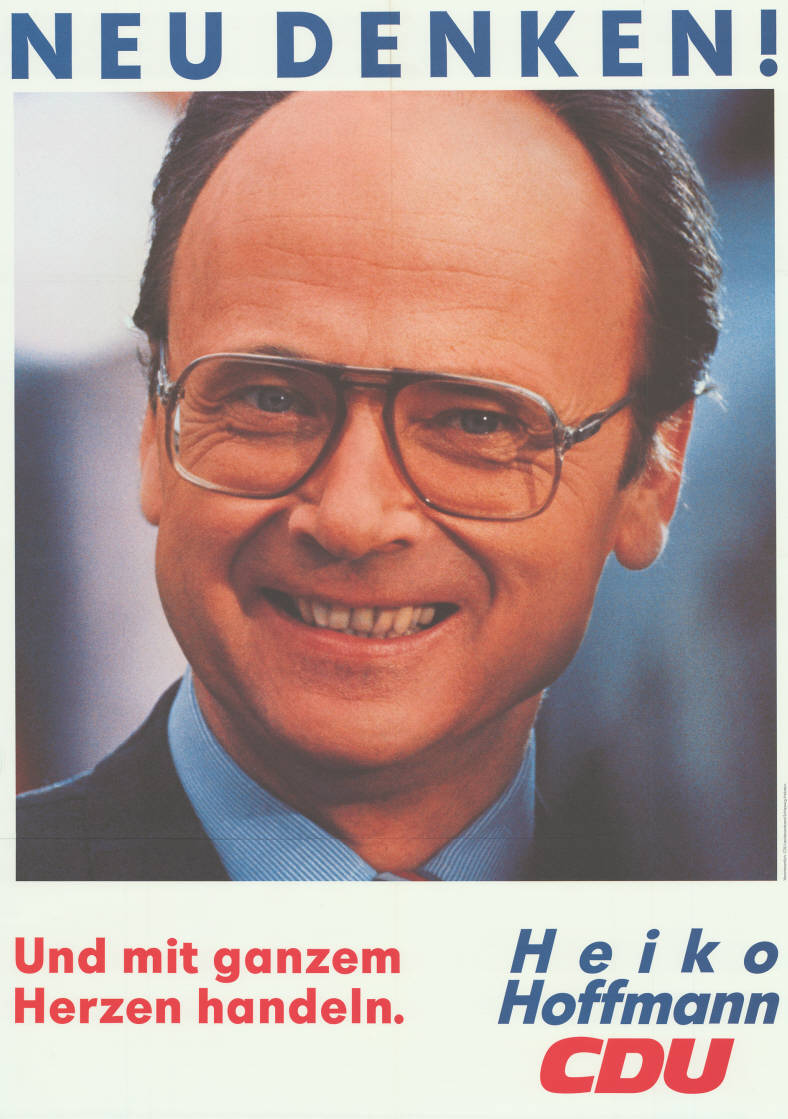
	First party	Second party	Third party
Leader	Björn Engholm	Heiko Hoffmann
Party	SPD	CDU	SSW
Last election	36 seats, 45.2%	33 seats, 42.6%	1 seat, 1.5%
Seats won	46	27	1
Seat change	▲10	▼6	0
Popular vote	857,956	521,264	26,643
Percentage	54.8%	33.3%	1.7%
Swing	▲9.6%	▼9.3%	▲0.2%
Minister-President before election
Henning Schwarz
CDU
Elected Minister-President
Björn Engholm
SPD

The 1988 Schleswig-Holstein state election was held on 8 May 1988 to elect the members of the Landtag of Schleswig-Holstein. The snap election was called due to the political stalemate that had occurred in the previous state election of 13 September 1987 and also because of the Barschel affair.

The election resulted in SPD winning an absolute majority, so Björn Engholm chose to govern alone without coalition. For the first time in 38 years, CDU had to go into opposition.

== Previous State Election ==
In the state elections on September 13, 1987, the CDU under Prime Minister Uwe Barschel lost the absolute majority it had held since 1971 with 42.6 percent of the votes cast and a loss of 6.4 percentage points, and for the first time since the state elections in 1958 it was behind the SPD, which achieved 45.2 percent of the votes under its top candidate Björn Engholm.

Together with the FDP, which had returned to the state parliament (4 seats), the CDU had 37 of the 74 state parliament seats. In contrast, there were 36 SPD representatives and the SSW representative, Karl Otto Meyer.

The formation of a government was made more difficult by the affair surrounding Prime Minister Uwe Barschel, who resigned on October 2, 1987 and died in Geneva on the night of October 10-11, 1987 under circumstances that have not yet been clarified. (Note: The CDU's candidates for the office of Prime Minister, which had been held by Interior Minister Henning Schwarz since Barschel's resignation, were the former Minister of Justice Heiko Hoffmann and the SPD's top candidate Björn Engholm.)

Due to the Barschel affair, Meyer refused to vote for a CDU candidate, thus paving the way for new elections.

== Election Campaign ==
The election was influenced by the results of the committee of inquiry into the machinations launched by the State Chancellery against the SPD's top candidate Engholm. According to the knowledge available at the time, a large part of the machinations, some of which were illegal, were the work of Uwe Barschel.

The CDU's candidates for the office of Prime Minister, which had been held by Interior Minister Henning Schwarz since Barschel's resignation, were the former Minister of Justice Heiko Hoffmann and the SPD's top candidate Björn Engholm.

== Results ==
Party	Votes	%	Direct Mandates	Seats
SPD	857,956	54.76	44	46
CDU	521,264	33.27		27
FDP	69,620	4.44		
GRÜNE	44,898	2.87		
SSW	26,643	1.70		1
NPD	19,154	1.22		
UWSH	12,791	0.82		
REP	8,673	0.55		
DKP	2,253	0.14		
S-H-P	2,245	0.14		
ÖDP	1,170	0.07		
FSU	170	0.01		
Total	1,566.837	100	44	74
