= Next German federal election =

- On or before 25 March 2029

All 630 seats in the Bundestag 316 seats needed for a majority
- Opinion polls
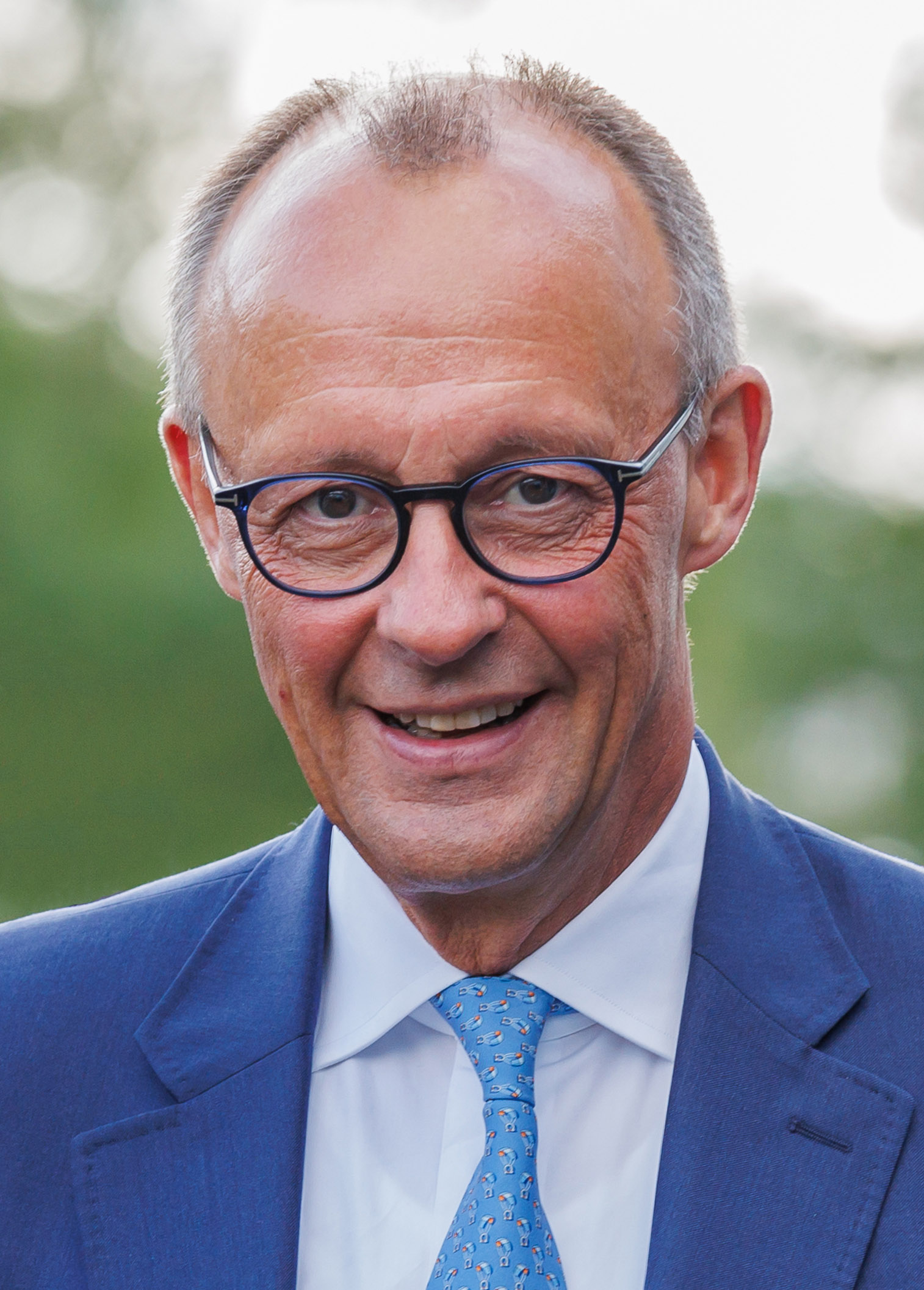

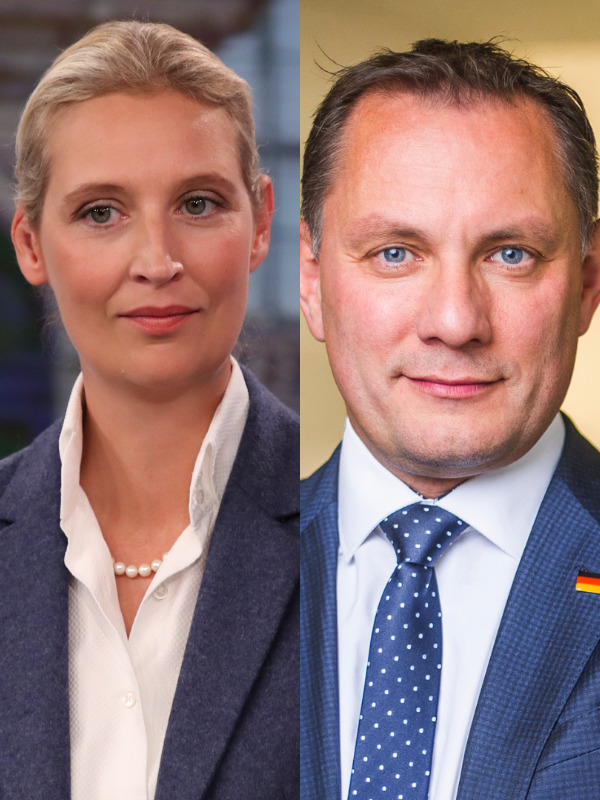

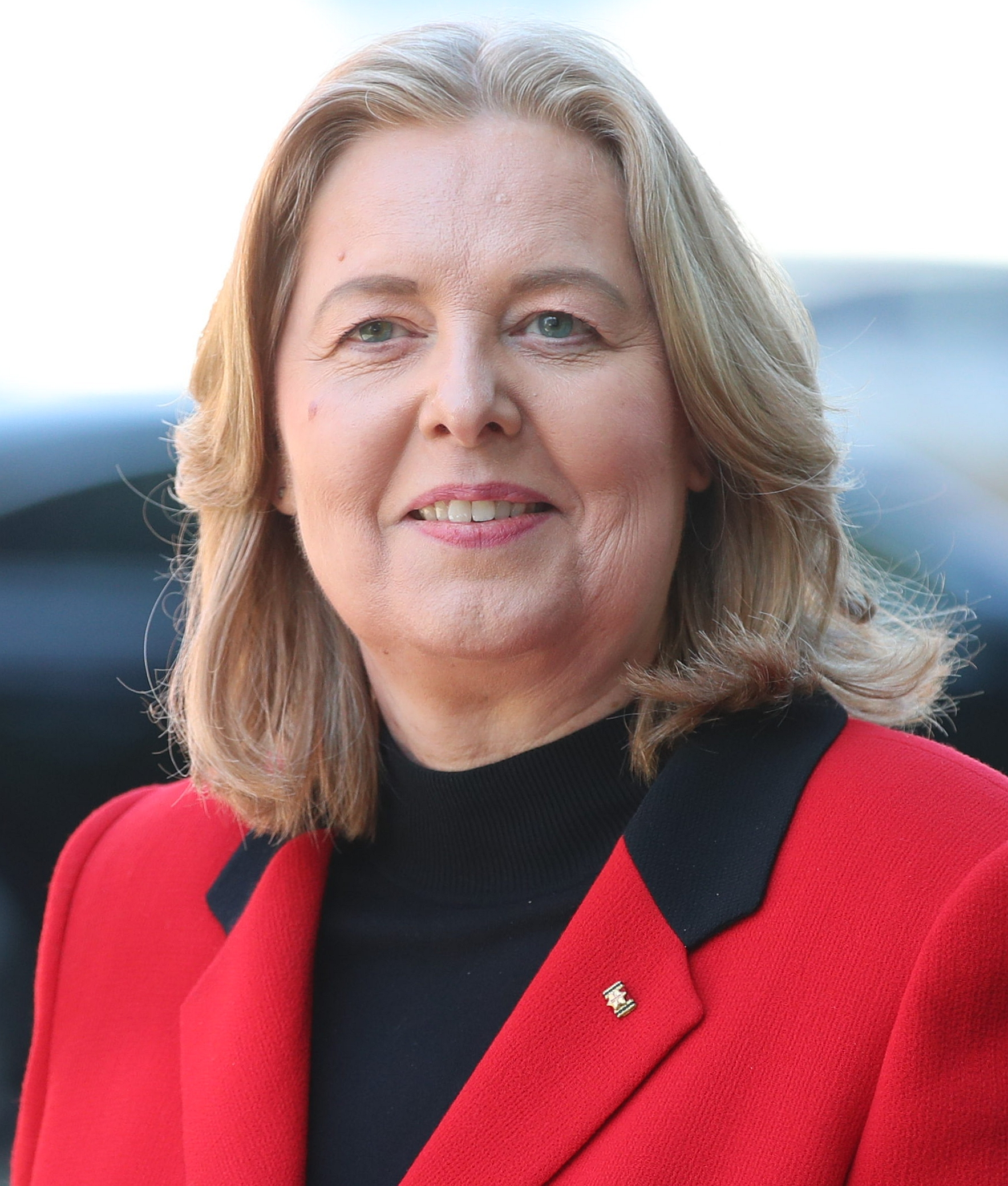

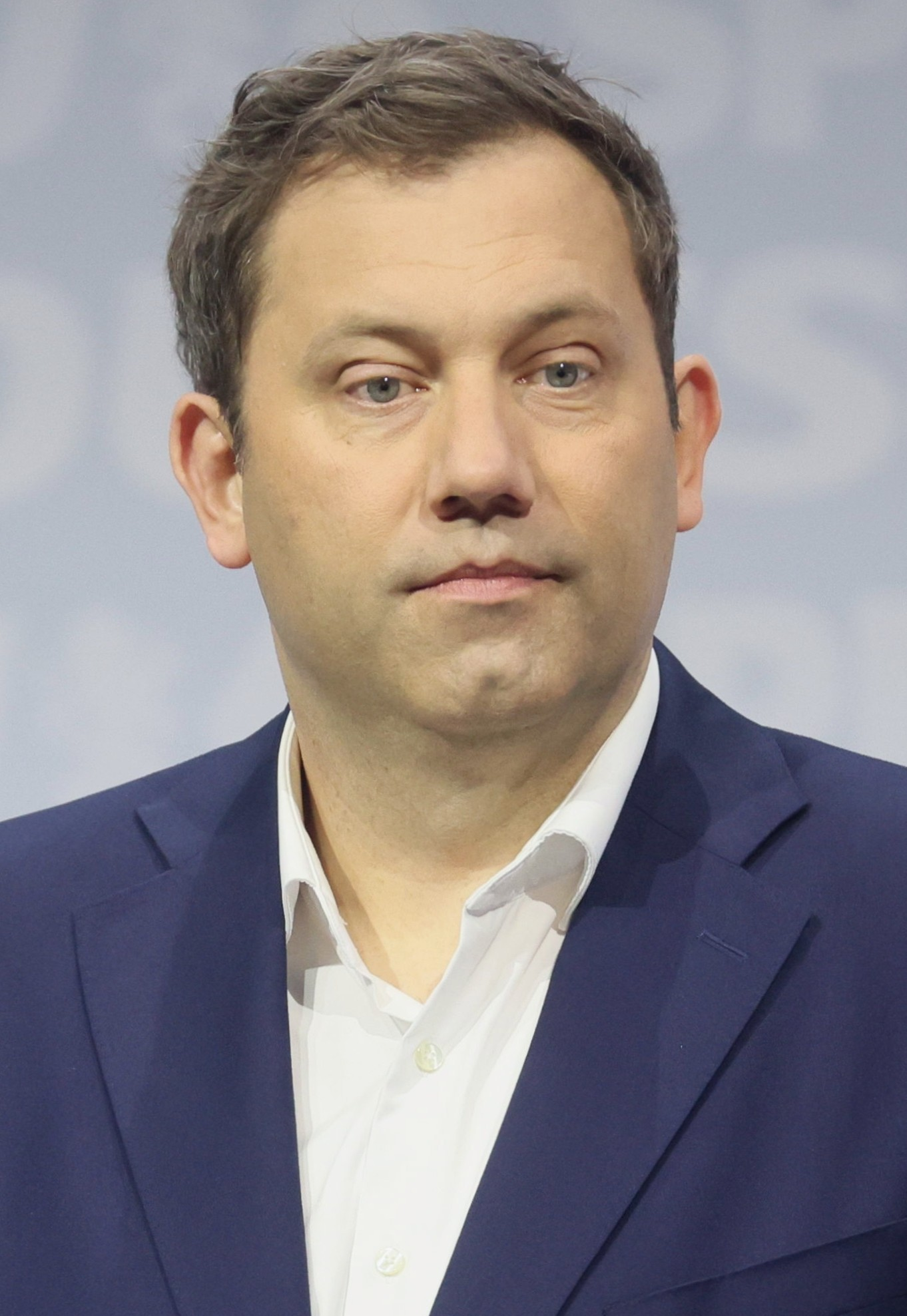

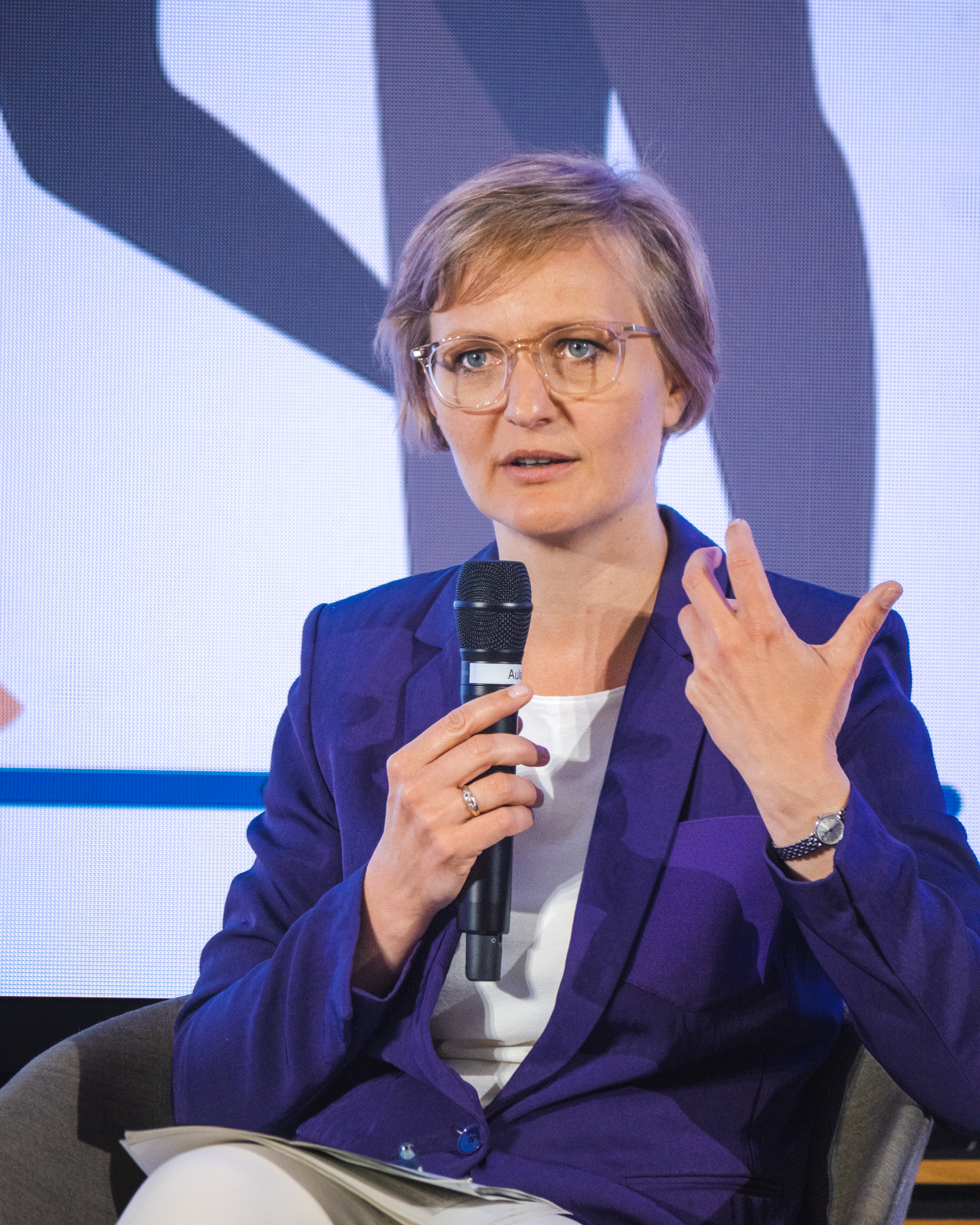

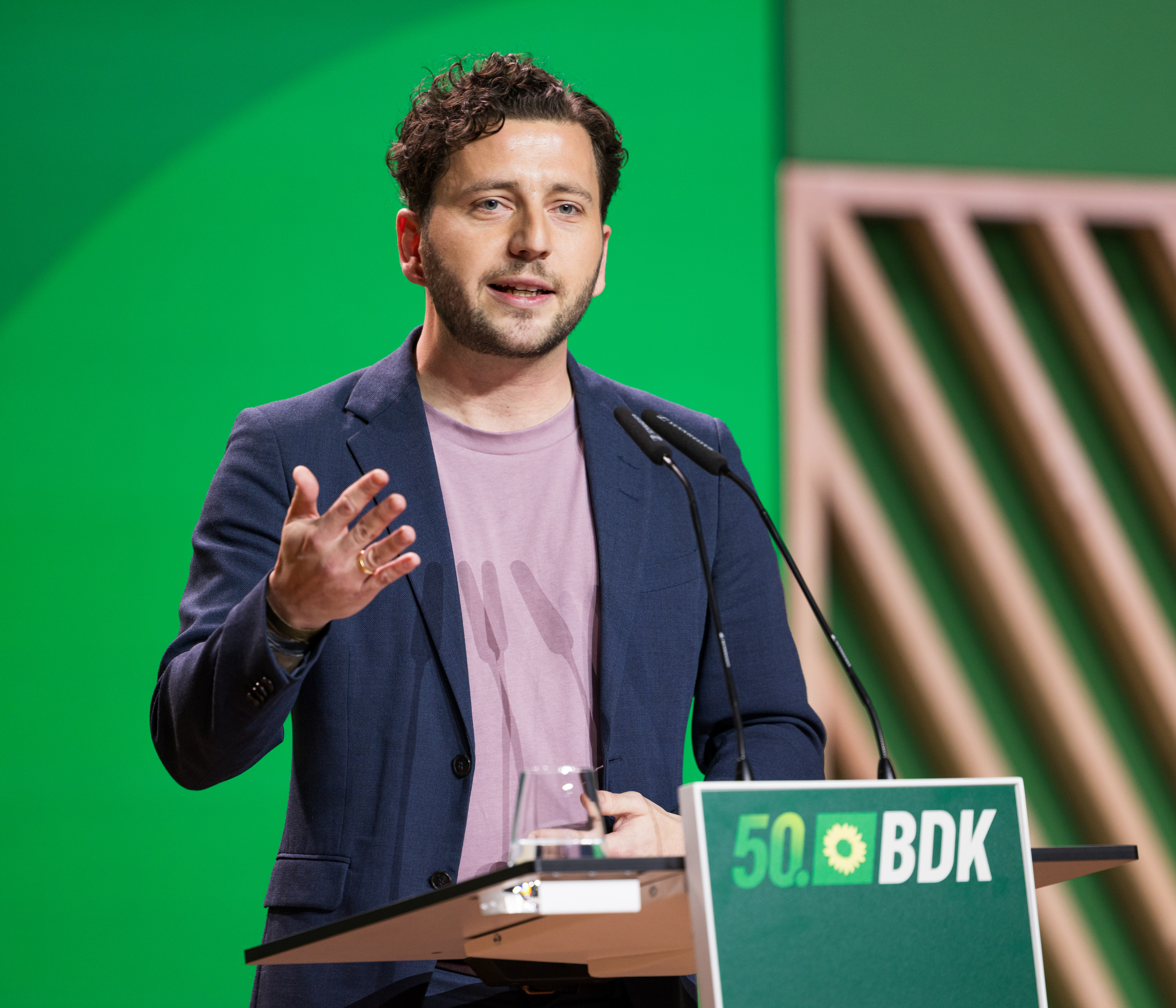

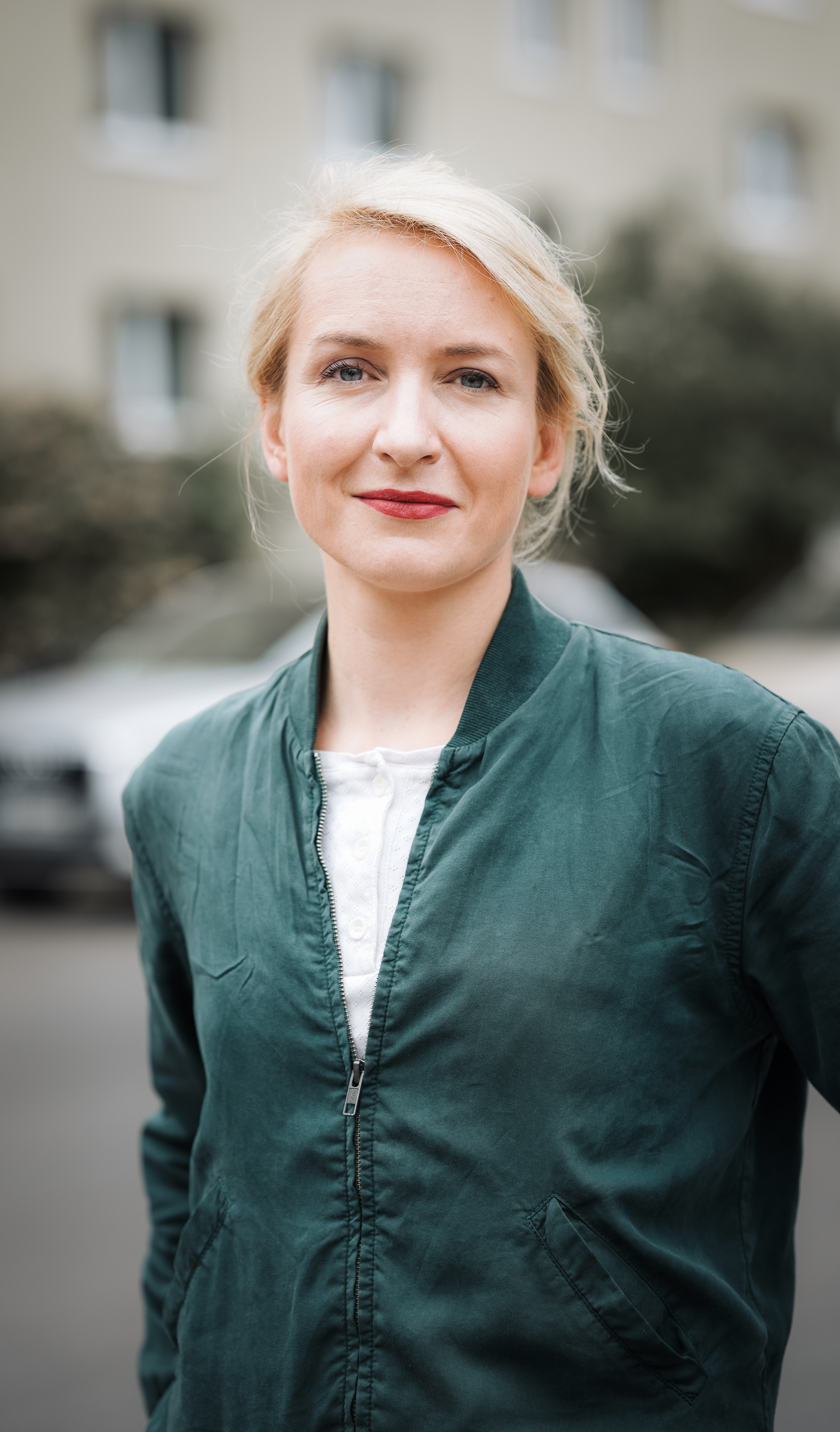

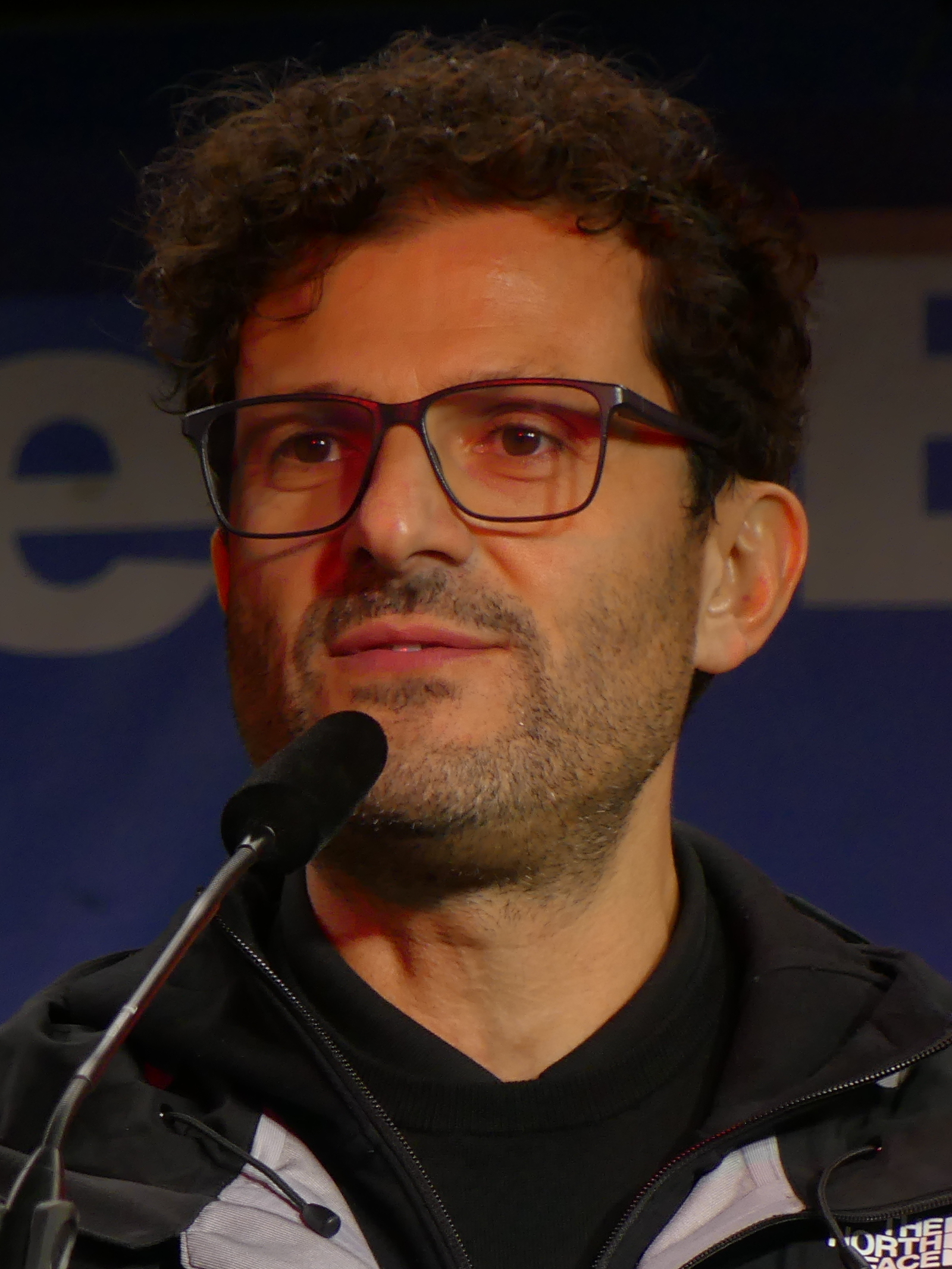

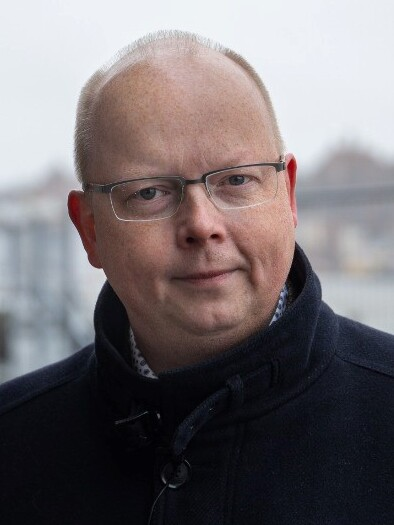
Leader	Friedrich Merz	Alice Weidel; Tino Chrupalla	Bärbel Bas; Lars Klingbeil
Party	CDU/CSU	AfD	SPD
Last election	28.5%, 208 seats	20.8%, 152 seats	16.4%, 120 seats
Current seats	208	151 (Note: Including one AfD deputy who is not a member of the AfD faction but non-attached.)	120
Leader	Franziska Brantner; Felix Banaszak	Ines Schwerdtner; Luigi Pantisano	Stefan Seidler
Party	Greens	Linke	SSW
Last election	11.6%, 85 seats	8.8%, 64 seats	0.15%, (Note: Minority parties are exempt from the 5% threshold.) 1 seat
Current seats	85	64	1
- A map of Bundestag constituencies used at the 2025 election.
Incumbent Government
Merz cabinet
CDU/CSU–SPD

A federal election will be held in Germany on or before 25 March 2029 to elect the members of the 22nd Bundestag.

== Background ==
=== Date assignment ===
The Basic Law and the Federal Election Act provide that regular federal elections must be held on a Sunday or on a national holiday (Note: In Germany, with the exception of the German Unity Day, all holidays are determined on the state level, and because of that, they do not necessarily apply for all German states. Currently, legal holidays in all states are New Year's Day, Good Friday, Easter Monday, Labour Day, Ascension Day, Whit Monday, German Unity Day, First Christmas Day, and Second Christmas Day (Boxing Day).) no earlier than 46 and no later than 48 months after the start of a legislative session. The 21st Bundestag was constituted on 25 March 2025 and has therefore been in session for 18 months. Accordingly, a scheduled federal election would have to take place on one of the following dates:

- 28 January 2029
- 4, 11, 18, 25 February 2029 or
- 4, 11, 18, 25 March 2029

The exact date will be determined by the president of Germany in due course. Federal elections can be held earlier, if the President of Germany dissolves the Bundestag and schedules a snap election. However, this is only possible under two scenarios described by the Basic Law:

1. Failed election of chancellor: If the Bundestag fails to elect a chancellor with an absolute majority of its members by the 15th day after the first ballot, the president is free to either appoint the candidate who received a plurality of votes on the last ballot as chancellor or to dissolve the Bundestag (in accordance with Article 63, Section 4 of the Basic Law).
2. Lost motion of confidence by the chancellor: The chancellor has the right to submit a motion to the Bundestag for a vote of confidence in him. If this motion fails, the Chancellor may ask the President to dissolve the Bundestag, though he is not required to do so. The President is free to accept or reject this request within 21 days (in accordance with Article 68 of the Basic Law).

In both cases, federal snap elections would have to take place on a Sunday or national holiday no later than 60 days after the dissolution. (Note: Possibility 1 has not occurred yet; possibility 2 has been used a total of four times to call the snap elections of 1972, 1983, 2005, and 2025).) No elections can be held during a state of defense; if this prolongs a legislative period, new elections must be held no later than six months after the end of the state of defense.

=== Electoral system ===
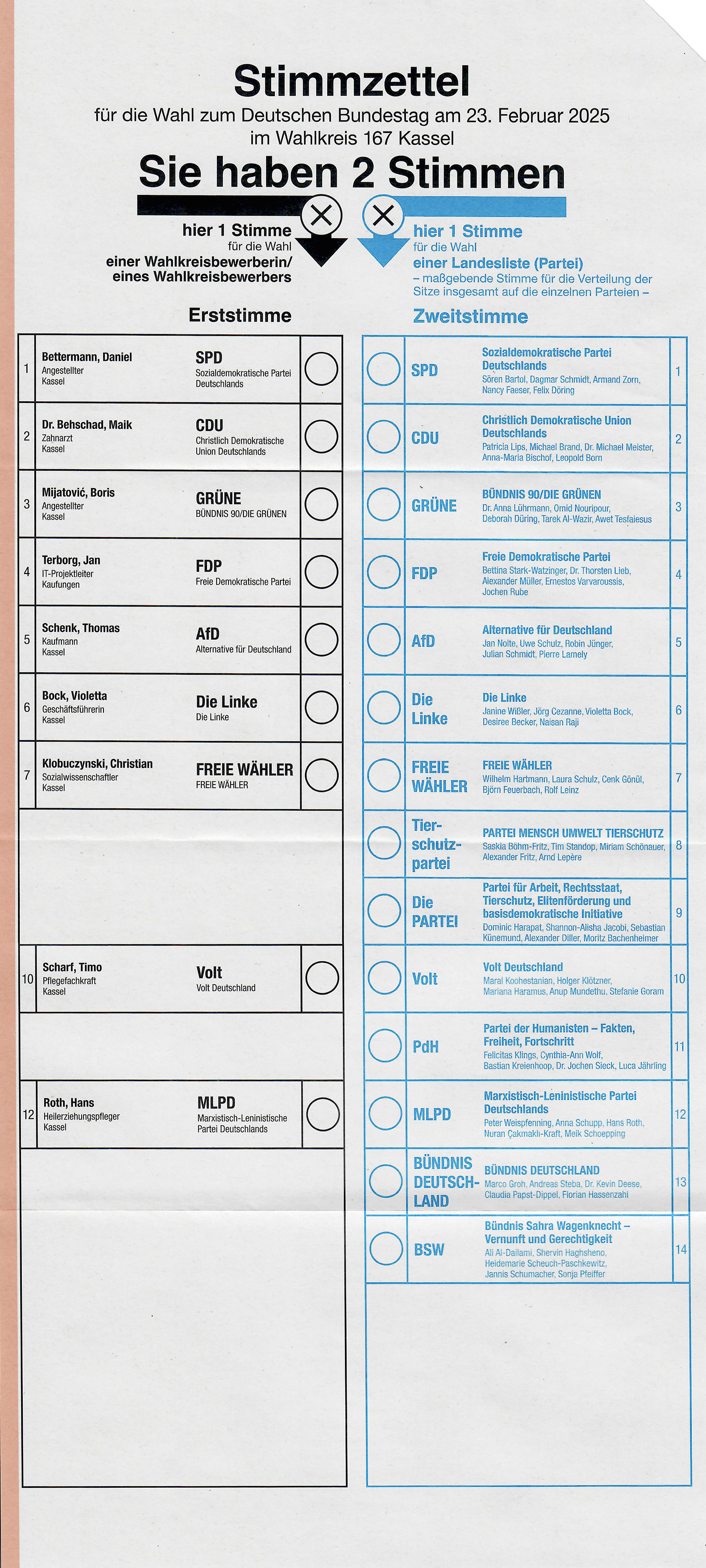
Bundestag ballot from the 2025 election in the Kassel district. The column for the constituency vote (with the name, occupation, and address of each candidate) is on the left in black print; the column for the party list vote (showing top five list candidates in the state) is on the right in blue print.

Germany uses a personalised proportional representation system, a system of proportional representation combined with elements of first-past-the-post voting. Every elector has two votes: a constituency vote (first vote) and a party list vote (second vote). Based primarily on the first votes, 299 members are elected in single-member constituencies by first-past-the-post voting (candidates of parties may only be elected if their party is entitled to list seats). The proportional distribution of the Bundestag's 630 seats among the parties is calculated on the basis of the second votes. The seats won by a party through the second votes are then distributed internally among the states, depending on how many second votes the party received in the individual states (the Sainte-Laguë method is used both for the distribution of seats between the parties and for the internal distribution of a party's seats among the states). In most cases, the number of constituencies won by a party in a given state (via first votes) does not exactly correspond to the number of seats to which the party is entitled in that state proportionally (via second votes). This is balanced in two different ways:

- If a party wins fewer constituencies in a state than it is entitled to based on the second-vote result, the highest-placed candidates from the state list are elected accordingly to the additional seats.
- If a party wins more constituency seats in a state than its second votes would entitle it to, the principle of second vote coverage (Zweitstimmendeckung) applies. This means that only the correspondent number of constituency winners with the highest percentage of first votes receive a seat. Constituency winners who have not won a seat in this case are given priority over the candidates on the respective state list in the event that a member leaves parliament prematurely during the legislative session.

To qualify for any seats, however, a party must either win three single-member constituencies via first votes (basic mandate clause) or exceed a threshold of 5% of the second votes nationwide. This does not apply to independent constituency candidates, however: these always enter the Bundestag if they win their constituency, which hardly ever happens. There were three in 1949, with candidates that were related to parties.

Parties representing recognized national minorities (Danes, Frisians, Sorbs, and Romani people) are exempt from both the 5% national threshold and the basic mandate clause, but must still meet state-level qualifications. The only party that so far has been willing and able to benefit from this provision on the federal level is the South Schleswig Voters' Association, which represents the minorities of Danes and Frisians in Schleswig-Holstein and managed to win a seat in 1949, 2021, and 2025.

The electoral law described here was adopted in 2023 and was used for the first time in the 2025 election. At the time, the CDU/CSU-faction criticized in particular the new aspect of so-called second vote coverage, and intends to reform electoral law again so that all constituency winners are once again guaranteed a seat, as had been the case before 2023. It is therefore possible that this electoral law will be changed before the next election.

== Political parties and leaders ==
Germany's political landscape with governing coalitions in 15 of 16 states, with seats in the Bundesrat, as of December 2024

Single party governments are unusual in Germany, a recent exception being the First Söder cabinet (CSU) until 2018 in Bavaria and since 2022 the Rehlinger cabinet (SPD) in the Saarland. The Alternative for Germany (AfD) is considered far-right by all other major parties; they have joined a "firewall" policy that rejects cooperation and tries to get AfD declared as illegal. Thus, for the time being, two-party or three-party government coalitions on federal and state levels are formed by CDU/CSU and SPD with various degree of support from Greens, Left, FDP, BSW (Note: German: Bündnis Sahra Wagenknecht – Vernunft und Gerechtigkeit), and FW. The table below lists the parties represented in the 21st Bundestag.

Parties		Leader(s)	Leading candidate(s)	Ideology	Seats		Status
Parties		Leader(s)	Leading candidate(s)	Ideology	Last election (2025)	Before election (current)	Status
CDU/CSU	Christian Democratic Union of Germany; Christlich Demokratische Union Deutschlands	Friedrich Merz	—	Christian democracy	164 / 630	164 / 630	Governing coalition
CDU/CSU	Christian Social Union in Bavaria; Christlich-Soziale Union in Bayern	Markus Söder	—	Christian democracy	44 / 630	44 / 630	Governing coalition
Alternative for Germany; Alternative für Deutschland		Alice Weidel; Tino Chrupalla	—	Right-wing populism Völkisch nationalism	152 / 630	151 / 630	Opposition
Social Democratic Party of Germany; Sozialdemokratische Partei Deutschlands		Bärbel Bas; Lars Klingbeil	—	Social democracy	120 / 630	120 / 630	Governing coalition
Alliance 90/The Greens; Bündnis 90/Die Grünen		Franziska Brantner; Felix Banaszak	—	Green liberalism	85 / 630	85 / 630	Opposition
The Left; Die Linke		Ines Schwerdtner; Jan van Aken	—	Democratic socialism	64 / 630	64 / 630	Opposition
Ungrouped	SSW	Christian Dirschauer	—	Danish and Frisian minority interests	1 / 630	1 / 630	Opposition

== Opinion polls ==
Opinion polling for the 2029 German federal election using Local regression (LOESS) of polls conducted.
