= Thomas Losse-Müller =

German politician (born 1973)

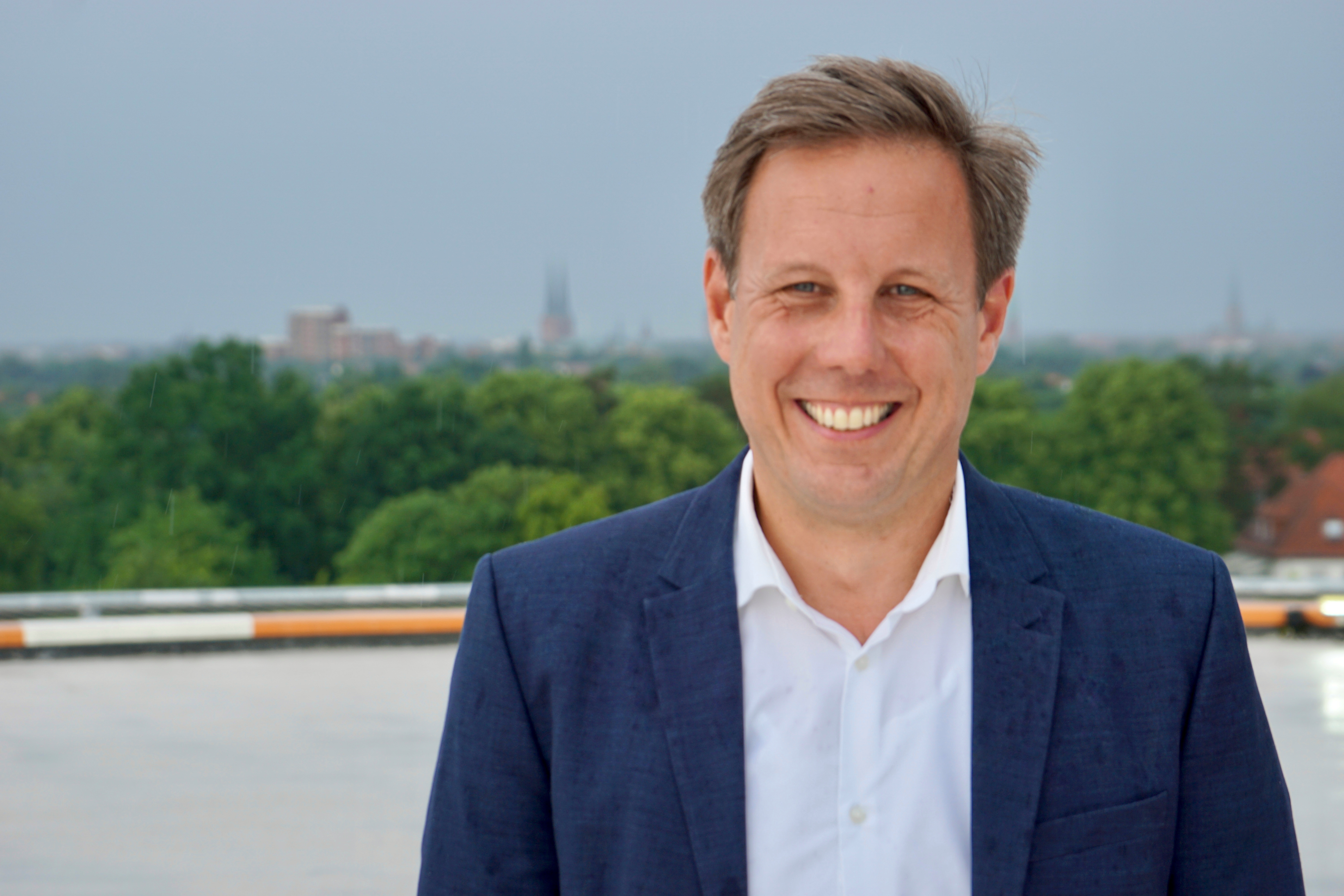
- Losse-Müller in 2021

Member of the Landtag of Schleswig-Holstein
- In office 7 June 2022 – 1 April 2024
- Preceded by: Torsten Albig (2017)
- Succeeded by: Kianusch Stender
- Constituency: Social Democratic List

Leader of the Opposition in the Landtag of Schleswig-Holstein
- In office 7 June 2022 – 12 December 2023
- Minister-President: Daniel Günther
- Preceded by: Serpil Midyatli
- Succeeded by: Serpil Midyatli

Leader of the Social Democratic Party in the Landtag of Schleswig-Holstein
- In office 18 May 2022 – 12 December 2023
- Chief Whip: Kai Dolgner
- Deputy: Martin Habersaat; Birte Pauls
- Preceded by: Serpil Midyatli
- Succeeded by: Serpil Midyatli

State Secretary and Chief of the State Chancellery of Schleswig-Holstein
- In office 26 September 2014 – 28 June 2017
- Minister-President: Torsten Albig
- Preceded by: Stefan Studt
- Succeeded by: Dirk Schrödter

State Secretary in the Ministry of Finance of Schleswig-Holstein
- In office 12 June 2012 – 26 September 2014
- Minister-President: Torsten Albig
- Minister: Monika Heinold
- Preceded by: Stefan Studt
- Succeeded by: Philipp Nimmermann

Personal details
- Born: Schwerte, North Rhine-Westphalia, West Germany (now Germany)
- Party: Social Democratic Party (2020–present)
- Other political affiliations: Alliance 90/The Greens (–2020)
- Education: University of Cologne, School of Oriental and African Studies, University of London

Thomas Losse-Müller (born 3 April 1973) is a German politician. He is a member of the Social Democratic Party of Germany and former Leader of his Party in the Landtag of Schleswig-Holstein.

== Career ==
Between 1992 and 1999, Losse-Müller studied economics at the University of Cologne. He went on to study Development Economics at the School of Oriental and African Studies.

From 2000 to 2004, Losse-Müller was an assistant vice president at Deutsche Bank in London. In 2004, he began working as a financial economist for the World Bank, until he began working as a program director for the German Society for technical cooperation in 2008. In 2010, Losse-Müller went back to work at the World Bank as a senior financial sector expert.

Before joining the Social Democratic Party of Germany in 2020, Losse-Müller was a member of Alliance 90/The Greens. He was a board member of the Hesse Alliance 90/The Greens between 2009 and 2012 and spokesperson to the Committee on Economy and Finance for the Hesse Alliance 90/The Greens between 2011 and 2012.

In 2012, Losse-Müller became State Secretary to the Schleswig-Holstein Ministry of Finance upon being invited to Schleswig-Holstein by Monika Heinold. He went on to serve as Head of the State Chancellery of Schleswig-Holstein between 2014 and 2017.

Between 2017 and 2021 Losse-Müller worked at EY Parthenon, a Consulting firm based in Hamburg.

In Fall of 2020, Losse-Müller became a member of the Social Democratic Party of Germany. He was nominated lead candidate for the 2022 state election in Schleswig-Holstein in August 2021.

Losse-Müller was elected his Party's Leader in the Landtag of Schleswig-Holstein on 18 May 2022 and thus became Leader of the Opposition.

On 6 December 2023, Losse-Müller announced his resignation as Leader of the Social Democratic Party in the Landtag of Schleswig-Holstein. He was succeeded by Serpil Midyatli, who is also his Predecessor.

== Personal life ==
Losse-Müller was born as son to two teachers in Schwerte, North Rhine-Westphalia. He is married and has two daughters.
