= Raudies =

Raudies is a surname. Notable people with the surname include:

- Beate Raudies (born 1966), German politician
- Dirk Raudies (born 1964), German motorcycle racer and sports presenter
