= 1987 Schleswig-Holstein state election =

German state election

- 13 September 1987

All 75 seats in the Landtag of Schleswig-Holstein 38 seats needed for a majority
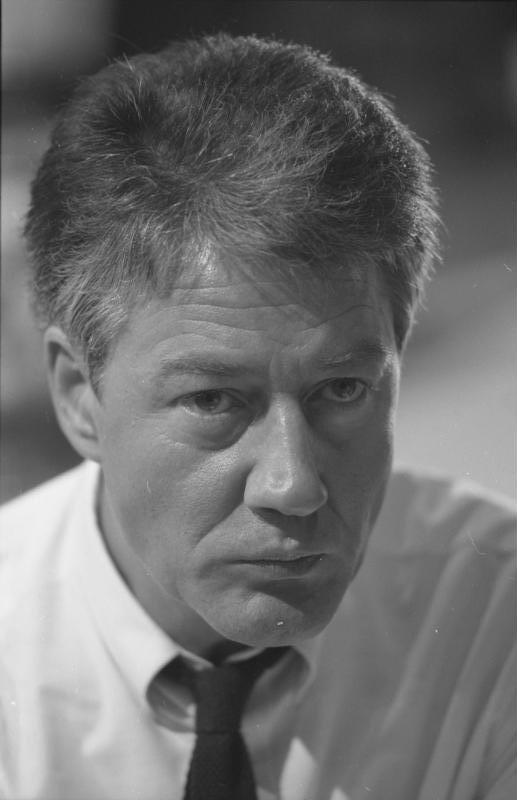

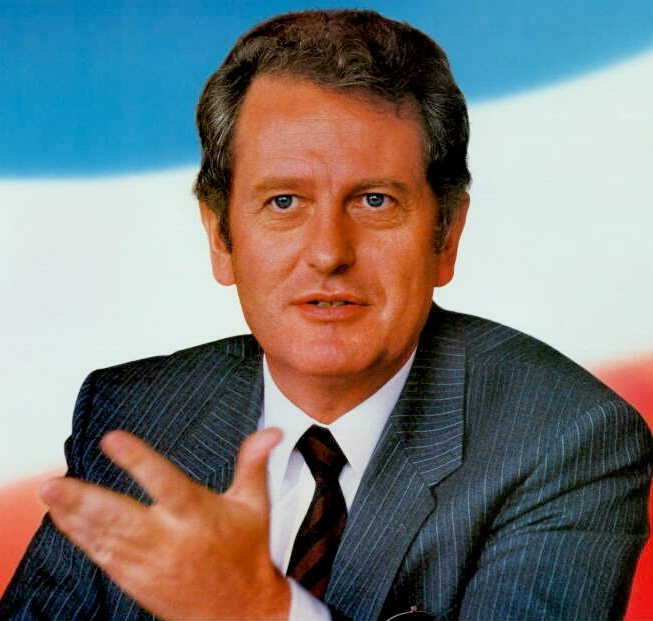
	First party	Second party
Leader	Björn Engholm	Uwe Barschel
Party	SPD	CDU
Last election	34 seats, 43.71%	39 seats, 49.00%
Seats won	36	33
Seat change	▲2	▼6
Popular vote	701,124	660,484
Percentage	45.23%	42.61%
Swing	▲1.52%	▼6.39%
	Third party	Fourth party
Party	FDP	SSW
Last election	0 seats, 2.16%	1 seat, 1.31%
Seats won	4	1
Seat change	▲4	0
Popular vote	81,113	23,316
Percentage	5.23%	1.50%
Swing	▲3.08%	▲0.19%
- Results for the single-member constituencies
Minister-President before election
Uwe Barschel
CDU
Elected Minister-President
Uwe Barschel
CDU

The 1987 Schleswig-Holstein state election was held on 13 September 1987 to elect the members of the Landtag of Schleswig-Holstein. The election resulted in a deadlock, with both the left-leaning parties (SPD and SSW) had 37 seats, and the right-leaning parties (CDU and FDP) had 37 seats, and concluded with the Barschel affair.

== Results ==
Political party	Votes	Share in %	Direct mandate	Seats
SPD	701,124	45.23	28	36
CDU	660,484	42.61	16	33
FDP	81,113	5.23		4
GRÜNE	60,408	3.90		
SSW	23,316	1.50		1
UWSH	20,628	1.33		
DKP	2,338	0.15		
ÖDP	556	0.03		
FSU	39	0.00		
Independents	30	0.00		
Total	1,550,036		44	74
