= Flemming Meyer =

Flemming Meyer may refer to:

- Flemming Meyer (rower)
- Flemming Meyer (politician)
