= Stefan Seidler =

Danish-German politician

Stefan Seidler MdB
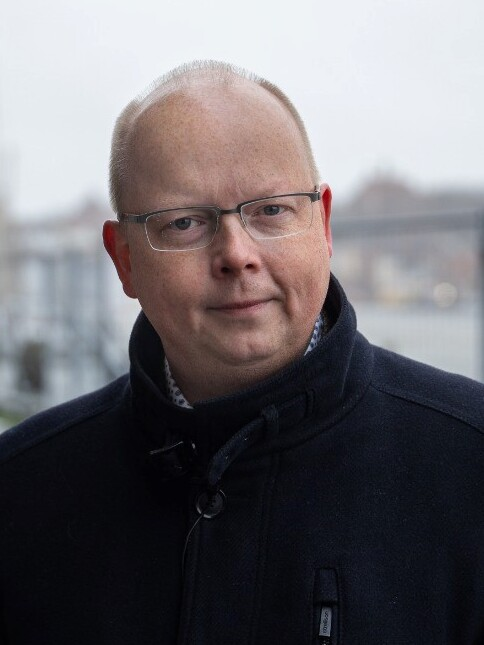
- Seidler in 2026

Member of the Bundestag for Schleswig-Holstein
- Incumbent
- Assumed office 26 October 2021
- Constituency: SSW list

Personal details
- Born: 18 December 1979 (age 46) Flensburg, Schleswig-Holstein, West Germany
- Citizenship: Germany • Denmark
- Party: SSW (since 1996)
- Other political affiliations: Danish Social Liberal Party
- Spouse: Marianne Madsen
- Children: 2
- Education: Aarhus University
- Website: stefan-seidler.info

Stefan Seidler (born 18 December 1979) is a Danish-German politician of the South Schleswig Voters' Association (SSW), the party representing the interests of the Danish and Frisian minority populations in Germany. Thus, the SSW is not subject to the general requirement of passing a 5% popular vote share threshold to gain proportional seats in state parliament and the Bundestag, just the much lower threshold to win a seat, about 0.16% for the Bundestag with 630 seats. The SSW has been represented in the Landtag of Schleswig-Holstein since 1958, and last contested a federal election in the 1961 West German election.

Seidler was elected to the 20th Bundestag from Schleswig-Holstein in the 2021 German federal election. His election represented the first time the SSW won a seat since Hermann Clausen in 1949. He was elected again in 2025.

== Early life and education ==
Seidler was born in 1979 in Flensburg, West Germany, as the son of a Danish-born teacher and a timber salesman from Flensburg. After completing his secondary education at Duborg-Skolen, he studied at Aarhus University in Aarhus, Denmark, where he obtained a master's degree in political science and a diploma in political communication. He is a member of the Danish Association of Lawyers and Economists.

== Political career ==
Seidler has been politically active in both Denmark and Germany. In Aarhus, he was deputy chairman of Radikal Ungdom, the youth wing of the Danish Social Liberal Party, and later was that party's candidate for both the Folketing (Danish Parliament) in 2007 and the European Parliament in 2004 and 2009. He was a member of Flensburg's city council, worked as a political consultant in Southern Denmark, and in 2014, became Schleswig-Holstein's coordinator of relations with the Danish government.

In 2021, he contested the constituency of Flensburg – Schleswig, located at the German-Danish border, for the SSW. He was defeated by Robert Habeck from Alliance 90/The Greens, but won a seat on the party's state list. He was re-elected to the 21st Bundestag in the 2025 German federal election.

== Personal life ==
Seidler is married and has two daughters.
