= Serpil Midyatli =

German politician (born 1975)

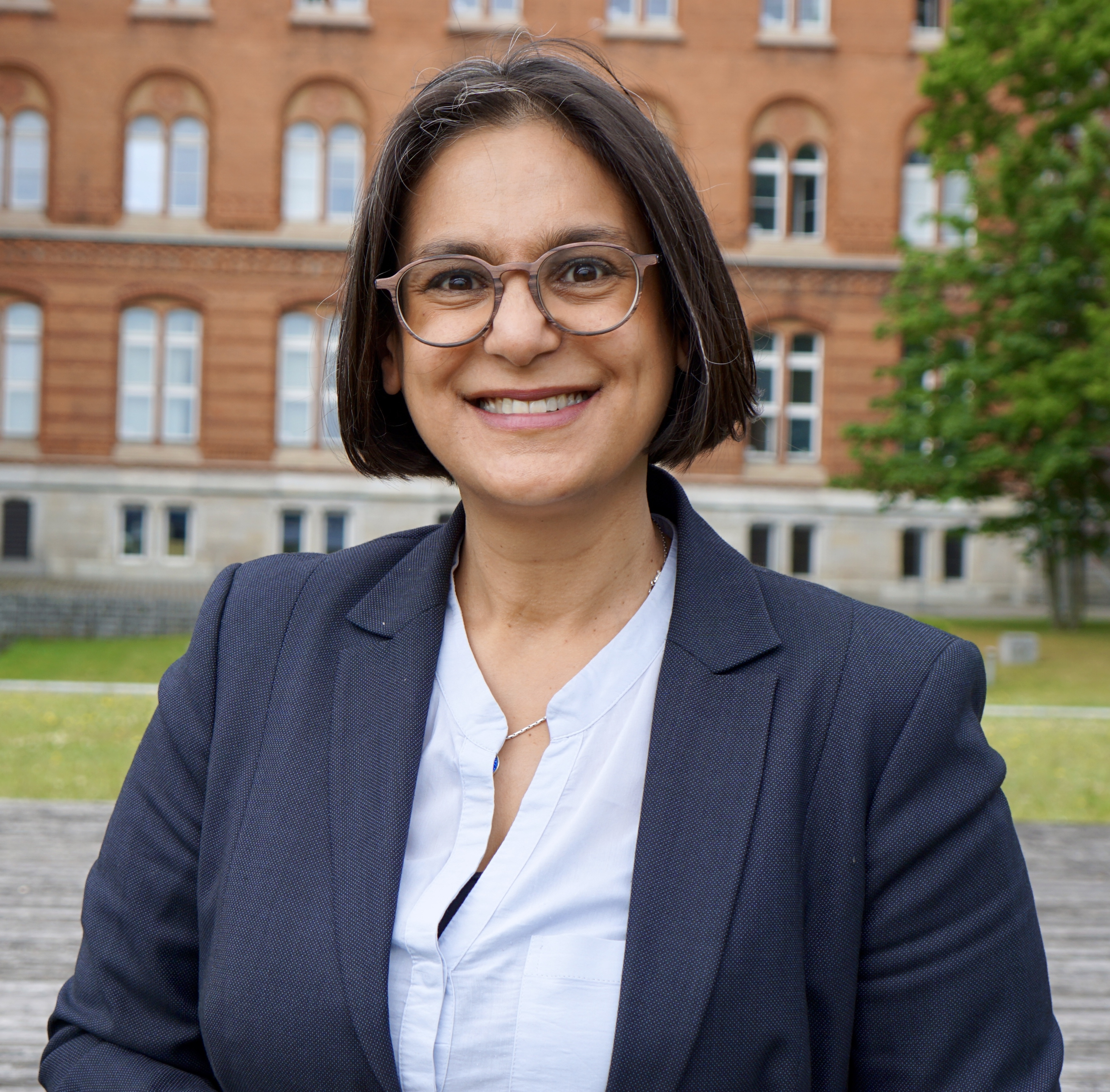
- Midyatli in 2021

Leader of the Opposition in the Landtag of Schleswig-Holstein
- Incumbent
- Assumed office 12 December 2023
- Minister-President: Daniel Günther
- Preceded by: Thomas Losse-Müller

Leader of the Social Democratic Party in the Landtag of Schleswig-Holstein
- Incumbent
- Assumed office 12 December 2023
- Chief Whip: Kai Dolgner
- Deputy: Martin Habersaat; Birte Pauls
- Preceded by: Thomas Losse-Müller

Member of the Landtag of Schleswig-Holstein
- Incumbent
- Assumed office 06 June 2017
- Constituency: Social Democratic List

Personal details
- Born: 8 August 1975 (age 50) Kiel, West Germany
- Party: Social Democratic Party

Serpil Midyatli (born 8 August 1975) is a Turkish-German politician who has been serving as deputy leader of the Social Democratic Party of Germany (SPD), and chairwoman of the SPD in Schleswig-Holstein since 2019. She has been the Leader of the Opposition in Schleswig-Holstein since July 2021.

== Political career ==
Midyatli joined the Social Democratic Party of Germany in 2000. She was part of the local municipal council in Kiel-Gaarden. Midyatli has been a member of the Landtag of Schleswig-Holstein since the 2009 election.

Midyatli's political topics of interest include social integration, equality, family policy, and other social issues. She is considered part of the left wing within the Social Democratic Party.

In March 2019 Midyatli became leader of the SPD in Schleswig-Holstein, succeeding Ralf Stegner to be the first woman in the office. On 6 December she was elected as one of five deputy federal chairpersons of her party. Prior to this, she supported Saskia Esken and Norbert Walter-Borjans in the leadership election. Also succeeding Ralf Stegner, Midyatli became chairwoman of the party's parliamentary group in the Landtag of Schleswig-Holstein and thereby leader of the opposition in July 2021.

In the negotiations to form a so-called traffic light coalition of the SPD, the Green Party and the FDP following the 2021 federal elections, Midyatli led her party's delegation in the working group on children, youth and families; her co-chairs from the other parties were Katrin Göring-Eckardt and Stephan Thomae.

Midyatli was nominated by her party as delegate to the Federal Convention for the purpose of electing the President of Germany in 2022.

In December 2023 Midyatli became Leader of the SPD in the Landtag of Schleswig-Holstein once again, after the incumbent Thomas Losse-Müller announced his resignation on 6 December 2023.

In the negotiations to form a Grand Coalition under the leadership of Friedrich Merz's Christian Democrats (CDU together with the Bavarian CSU) and the SPD following the 2025 German elections, Midyatli led the SPD delegation in the working group on families, women, youth, senior and democracy; her counterparts from the other parties were Silvia Breher and Susanne Hierl.

== Views ==
Midyatli is considered a high-profile family policy-maker. Among other things, she stands for non-contributory daycare centers and more all-day care in primary schools. In 2020 she initiated a discussion about reducing working hours. From Midyatli's point of view, a 30-hour week would make it easier to combine parenting with gainful employment.

In 2021, she expressly committed herself to home ownership. The SPD would always fight to ensure that rents remained affordable. But that also applies to the possibility of buying an apartment or a house. Owning your own home is a symbol of social advancement. Midyatli advocates models that require less equity. This includes rental purchase.

== Other activities ==
- Business Forum of the Social Democratic Party of Germany, Member of the Political Advisory Board (since 2020)

== Personal life ==
Midyatli was born in 1975 in Kiel, where she also grew up. Her parents are from Turkey, her father is of Kurdish descent, while her mother is of Arab origin. She is a Muslim, married, and has two sons. In addition to German, she also has Turkish citizenship.

After graduating from the Realschule in 1992, Midyatli originally planned to study law. Instead she came to lead a restaurant owned by her parents at the age of 18. She later ran a concert hall, a catering company, and founded a cultural event company with her husband.

In 2015 she was accepted into the executive board of the Schleswig-Holstein Homeland Association, where she serves as the third deputy of the president.
