= Henning Schwarz =

German politician

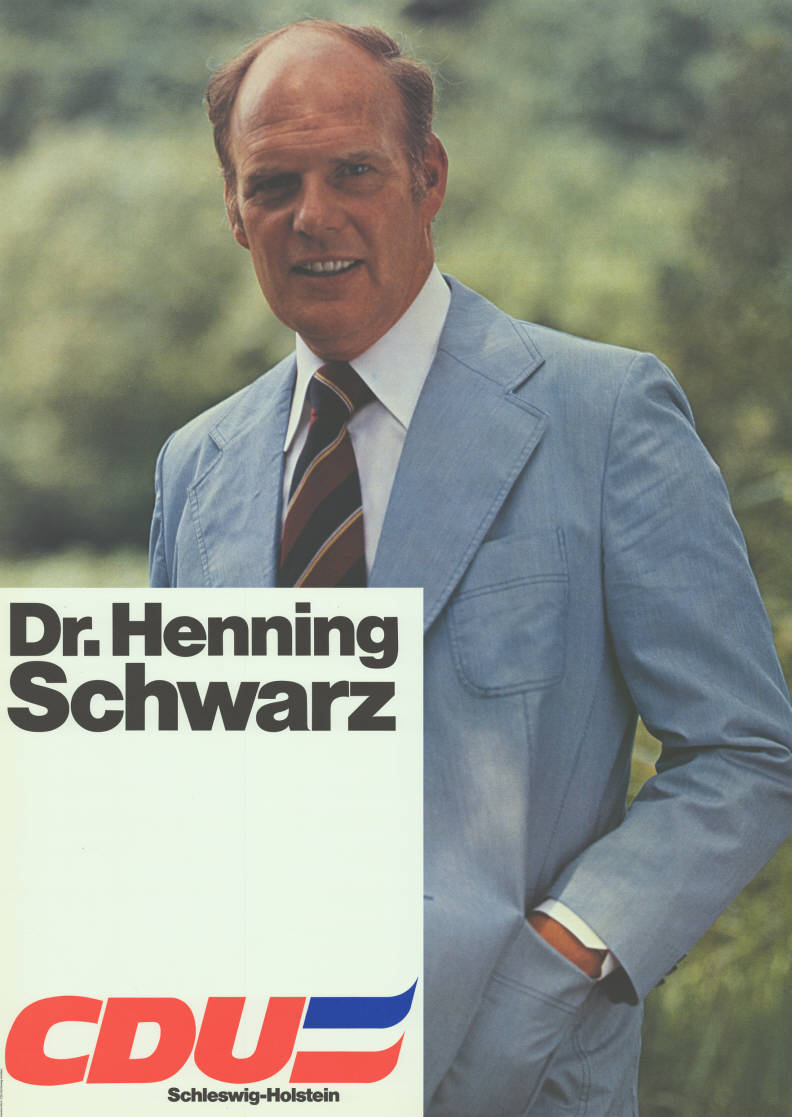
- Schwarz featured on a 1979 campaign poster

Minister-President of Schleswig-Holstein
- Interim
- In office 2 October 1987 – 31 May 1988
- Deputy: vacant
- Preceded by: Uwe Barschel
- Succeeded by: Björn Engholm

Deputy Minister-President of Schleswig-Holstein
- In office 26 May 1975 – 2 October 1987
- Minister-President: Gerhard Stoltenberg; Uwe Barschel
- Preceded by: Ernst Engelbrecht-Greve
- Succeeded by: Marianne Tidick (1988)
Schleswig-Holstein Cabinet
Minister of Federal Affairs
In office 29 May 1979 – 31 May 1988
Minister-President	Gerhard Stoltenberg; Uwe Barschel himself
Preceded by	Position established
Succeeded by	Marianne Tidick
Minister of Justice
In office 13 April 1983 – 16 December 1985
Minister-President	Uwe Barschel
Preceded by	Karl Eduard Claussen
Succeeded by	Heiko Hoffmann
In office 3 November 1969 – 29 Mai 1979
Minister-President	Helmut Lemke; Gerhard Stoltenberg
Preceded by	Claus-Joachim von Heydebreck
Succeeded by	Karl Eduard Claussen
Parliamentary constituencies
Member of the Landtag of Schleswig-Holstein
In office 29 May 1979 – 2 October 1987
Preceded by	Siegfried Loose
Succeeded by	Trutz Graf Kerssenbrock
Constituency	Ahrensburg
In office 24 May 1971 – 24 May 1975
Preceded by	Constituency established
Succeeded by	Kurt Böge
Constituency	Segeberg-West

Personal details
- Born: Henning Michael Schwarz; 5 October 1928 Gut Frauenholz, Province of Schleswig-Holstein, Free State of Prussia, Weimar Republic (now Rethwisch, Schleswig-Holstein, Germany)
- Died: 13 April 1993 (aged 64) Kiel, Germany
- Cause of death: Leukemia
- Party: CDU Christian Democratic Union of Germany (CDU) (1948–1993)
- Children: 3
- Education: University of Würzburg; University of Hamburg
- Occupation: Politician; Lawyer; Notary
- Cabinet: Lemke II; Stoltenberg I Stoltenberg II; Stoltenberg III; Barschel I Barschel II; Schwarz

Henning Schwarz (24 October 1928 – 13 April 1993) was a German politician of the Christian Democratic Union (CDU). He was interim Minister-President of Schleswig-Holstein during the Barschel affair.

== Life ==
Schwarz was born in Bad Oldesloe. His father was German CDU politician Werner Schwarz. Schwarz studied law in Würzburg and Hamburg, receiving a Doctor of Law in 1958. He then worked as a lawyer.

From 1971 to 1975 and from 1979 to 1987 he was member of the Landtag of Schleswig-Holstein. Since 1969, he served in various cabinet positions in the Schleswig-Holstein state government under Minister-Presidents Helmut Lemke, Gerhard Stoltenberg and Uwe Barschel, most of the time as Minister of Justice. In 1975, Stoltenberg named him Deputy Minister-President, a position which he kept after Barschel became Minister-President due to Stoltenberg being appointed Federal Minister of Finance.

After the 1987 Schleswig-Holstein state election, the CDU lost their absolute majority and the Barschel affair became public. Due to a deadlock in the Landtag and the affair, new elections were called for 1988. Barschel resigned on 2 October 1987 and later died on 11 October. Schwarz, as Deputy Minister-President, became Minister-President of Schleswig-Holstein on an interim basis until a new government was formed after the May 1988 election. He himself did not run in that election; CDU candidate for Ministers-President (Spitzenkandidat) instead was his Minister of Justice Heiko Hoffmann. The SPD won and Schwarz retired from politics.

Schwarz holds the distinction of being the longest-serving interim Minister-President of a German state, serving for the entire 11th legislative term, lasting about eight months. Most interim Minister-Presidents serve only for a few days (such as Michael Vesper in 2002 or Katharina Fegebank in 2018), some even for just one day on the grounds of constitutional technicalities (such as Jörg Bode in 2010 or Joachim Stamp in 2021). He is also the first and only interim Minister-President to lead his own cabinet, Kabinett Schwarz.

He was married and had three children. He died in Kiel.

== Awards ==
- 1978: Order of Merit of the Federal Republic of Germany
