= Lars Harms =

Lars Harms may refer to:

- Lars Harms (squash player)
- Lars Harms (politician)
