= Stenders =

Stenders is a surname. Notable people with the surname include:

- Kriv Stenders, Australian writer and film director
- Rob Stenders (born 1965), Dutch radio DJ

== See also ==
- Stenders Quarry, Gloucestershire, England
- A shortened name of EastEnders
- Stender (disambiguation)
