= Nelly Waldeck =

German politician (born 1997)

Member of the Landtag of Schleswig-Holstein
- Incumbent
- Assumed office 7 June 2022

Personal details
- Born: 19 April 1997 (age 28)
- Party: Alliance 90/The Greens

Nelly Waldeck (born 19 April 1997) is a German politician serving as a member of the Landtag of Schleswig-Holstein since 2022. From 2020 to 2021, she served as managing director of the Green Youth in Schleswig-Holstein.
