= Ute Erdsiek-Rave =

German politician

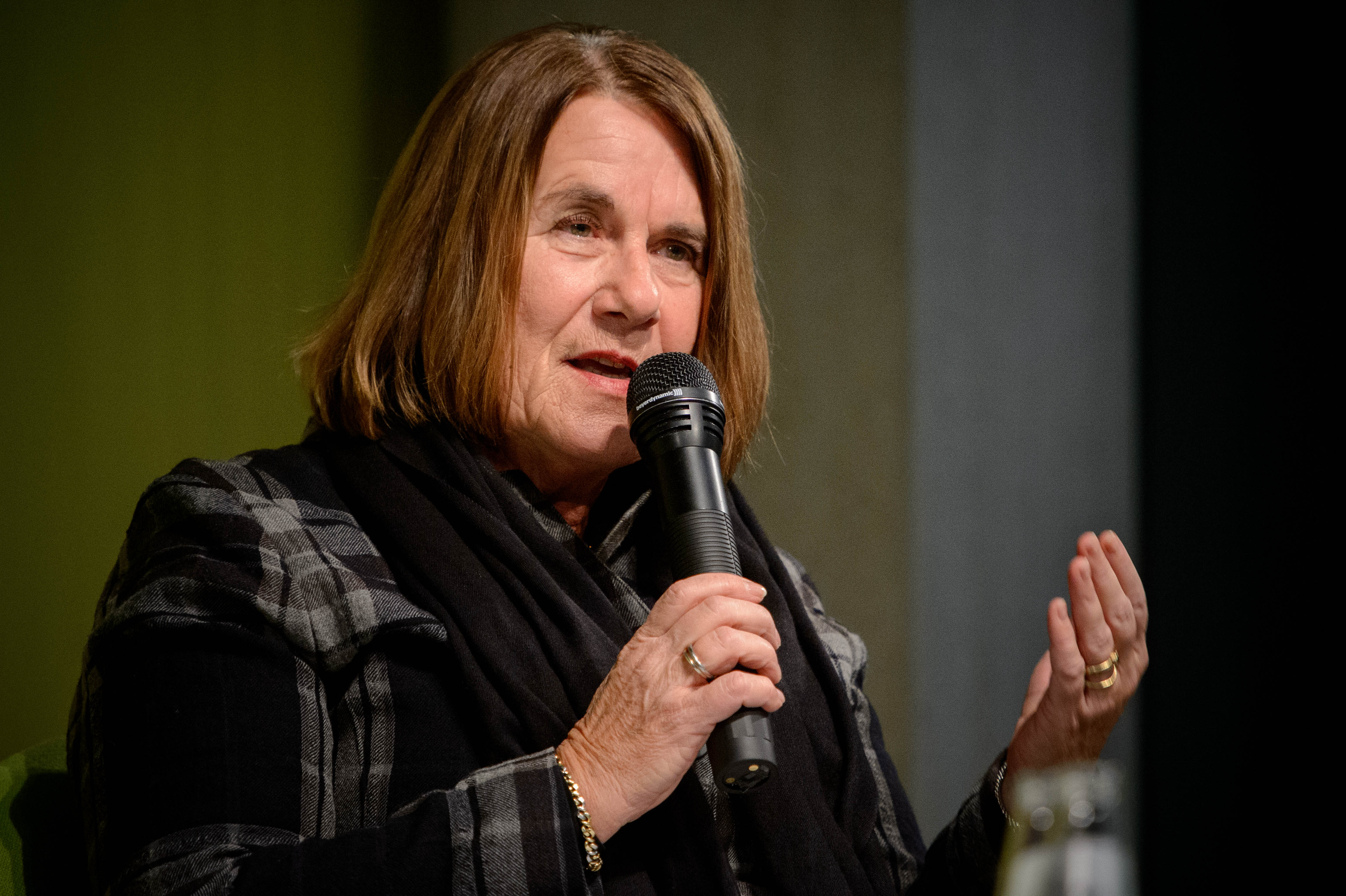
- Ute Erdsiek-Rave at the event “Keeping the school in the village” of the Heinrich Böll Foundation Berlin in 2013.

Deputy Minister-President of Schleswig-Holstein
- In office 2005–2009

Minister of Education of Schleswig-Holstein
- In office 1998–2009

President of the Landtag of Schleswig-Holstein
- In office 1992–1996

Member of the Landtag of Schleswig-Holstein
- In office 1987–2009

Personal details
- Born: 2 January 1947 (age 79) Heide, Holstein, West Germany
- Party: Social Democratic Party of Germany

Ute Erdsiek-Rave (born 2 January 1947) is a German politician from Social Democratic Party (SPD). She was Deputy Minister-President of the state of Schleswig-Holstein from 2005 to 2009 and also Minister of Education from 1998 to 2009.

== Biography ==
After graduating from high school in 1966, she initially began studying German literature in Bochum and Kiel, but then transferred to the Kiel University of Education. After passing her state examination, she worked as a teacher from 1972 to 1974. She then worked for three years in Sweden at Stockholm, including at the Goethe-Institut. Since 1977, she has been working again in the school system of the state of Schleswig-Holstein. Erdsiek-Rave is married to Klaus Rave and has two daughters and a son.

== Political career ==
Ute Erdsiek-Rave has been a member of the Schleswig-Holstein SPD since 1969. From 1983 to 1986, she was deputy state chairwoman of the Working Group of Social Democratic Women. Until December 1987, she was a member of the Rendsburg-Eckernförde district council, where she chaired the school and culture committee. From 1987 to 2009, she was a member of the Landtag of Schleswig-Holstein, where she served as deputy chairwoman of the SPD parliamentary group from 1988 to 1992 and as chairwoman from 1996 to 1998.

From 1992 to 1996 she was President of the Landtag of Schleswig-Holstein.

== Public offices ==
On 28 October 1998, she was appointed Minister for Education, Science, Research, and Culture in the state government led by Minister-President Heide Simonis. During her tenure, the educational mandate of daycare centers was enshrined in the daycare law, and general and specialized language support in daycare centers was intensified. Reliable primary school attendance was introduced, and the substitute teacher fund "Every Hour Counts" was established. In 2003, the expansion of open all-day schools began, later followed by structured all-day schools. Following Heide Simonis's unsuccessful re-election on 17 March 2005, she temporarily served only in a caretaker capacity.

From 27 April 2005 to 20 July 2009, she served in the grand coalition cabinet led by Minister-President Peter Harry Carstensen (CDU) as Minister for Education and Women and as Deputy Minister-President. In her capacity as minister, she was President of the Kultusministerkonferenz in 2006. Under the difficult political conditions in Schleswig-Holstein, she succeeded, together with the CDU, in drafting a new school law that included the Gemeinschaftsschule. This abolished the elementary school system in Schleswig-Holstein. In an appreciation, the FAZ emphasized that Ms. Erdsiek-Rave "had been instrumental in holding the coalition together with her thoughtful and conciliatory manner".

Following the collapse of the Grand Coalition following the 2009 Schleswig-Holstein state election, Erdsiek-Rave, along with all other SPD ministers, was dismissed from her posts in the state government by Peter Harry Carstensen on 20 July 2009, effective 21 July 2009. She subsequently announced her withdrawal from active politics.

For a time, she was, among other things, chair of the expert group "Inclusive Education" of the German Commission for UNESCO.

== See also ==
- Second Simonis cabinet
- Third Simonis cabinet
- First Carstensen cabinet

== Works (selection) ==
- Ute Erdsiek-Rave, Marei John-Ohnesorg (Hrsg.): Individuell Fördern mit multiprofessionellen Teams. Friedrich-Ebert-Stiftung, Berlin 2014, ISBN 978-3-86498-908-7.
- Ute Erdsiek-Rave, Marei John-Ohnsorg (Hrsg.): Inklusion in der beruflichen Ausbildung. FES, Berlin 2015, ISBN 978-3-95861-093-4.
