= Kianusch Stender =

German politician (born 1993)

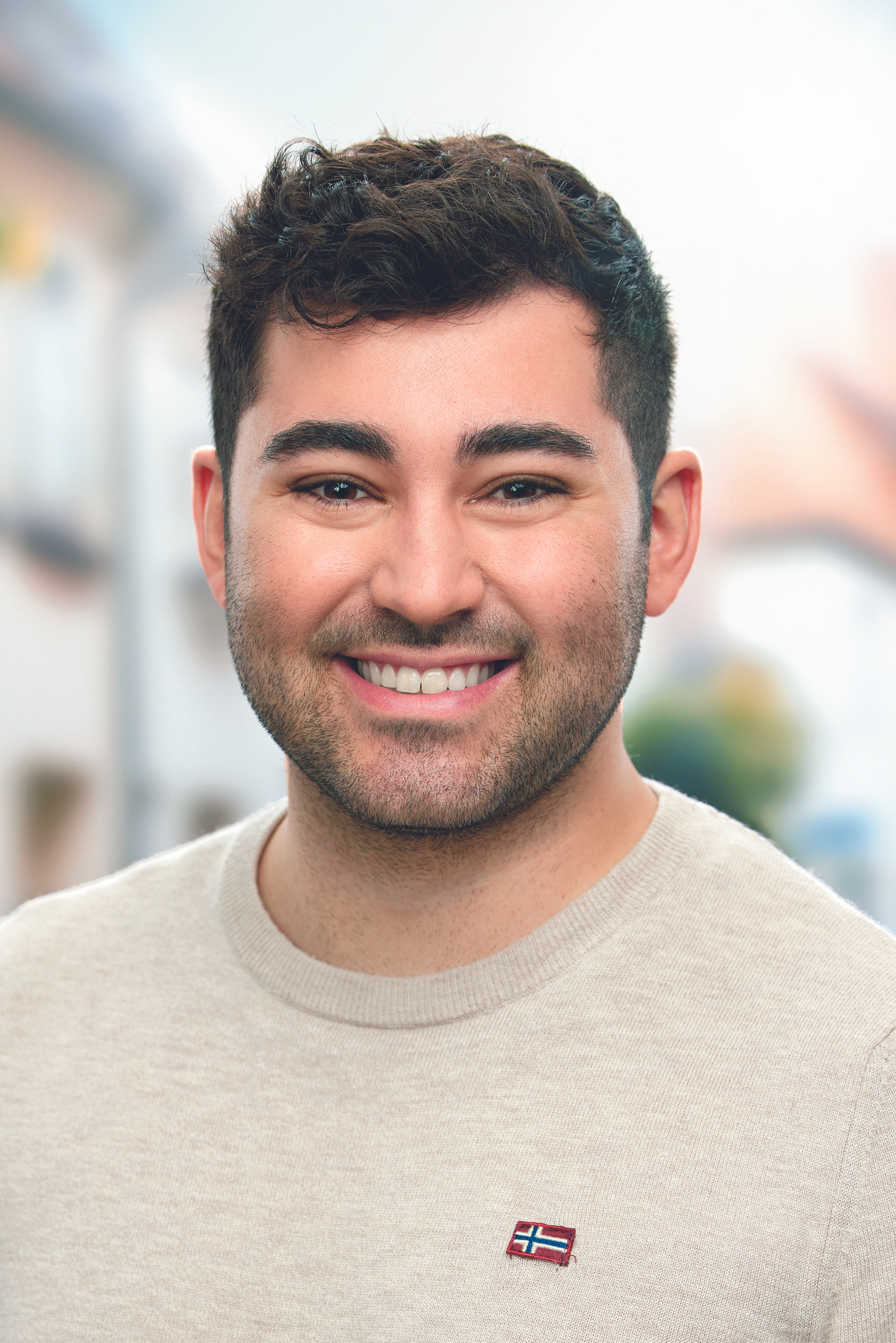
- Stender in 2022

Member of the Landtag of Schleswig-Holstein
- Incumbent
- Assumed office 2 April 2024
- Preceded by: Thomas Losse-Müller

Personal details
- Born: 22 October 1993 (age 32)
- Party: Social Democratic Party (since 2014)

Kianusch Stender (born 22 October 1993) is a German politician serving as a member of the Landtag of Schleswig-Holstein since 2024. He has served as chairman of the Social Democratic Party in Flensburg since 2023. From 2021 to 2023, he served as chairman of Jusos in Schleswig-Holstein.
