= Lars Harms (politician) =

German politician

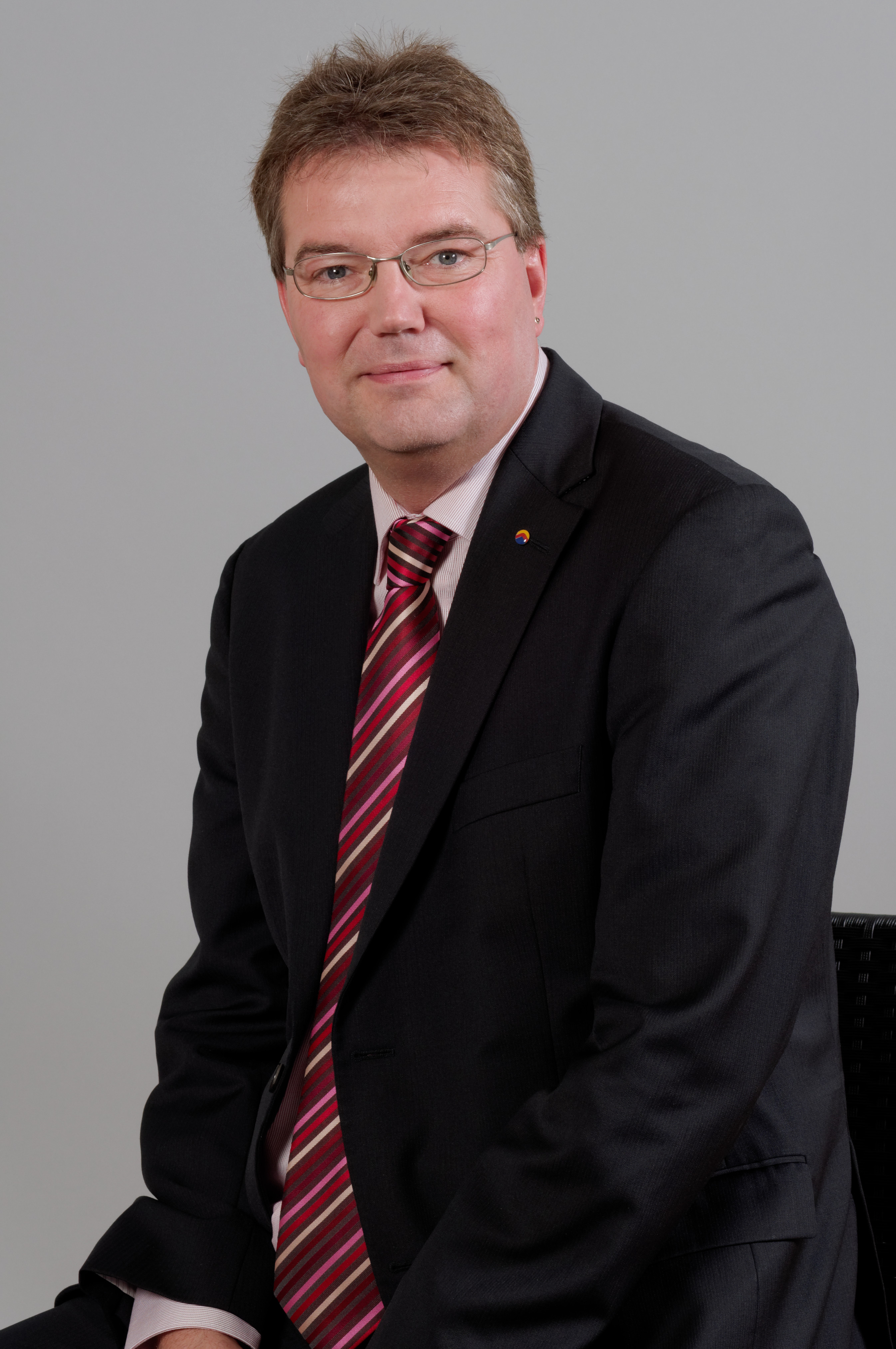
Lars Harms in 2013.

Lars Harms (born 8 November 1964 in Husum) is a German politician from the South Schleswig Voters' Association.

He has been a member of the Landtag of Schleswig-Holstein since 2000.
