= Stender =

Stender is a surname of Germanic or Nordic origin and may refer to:

- Gotthard Friedrich Stender (1714–1796), Latvian grammarian, lexicographer, and poet
- Inger Stender (1912–1989), Danish actress
- Kianusch Stender (born 1993), German politician
- Linda Stender (born 1951), American politician
- Margaret Stender, American businesswomen and marketer
- Paul Stender, American Race Driver & Daredevil
