= Flemming Meyer (politician) =

German-Danish politician

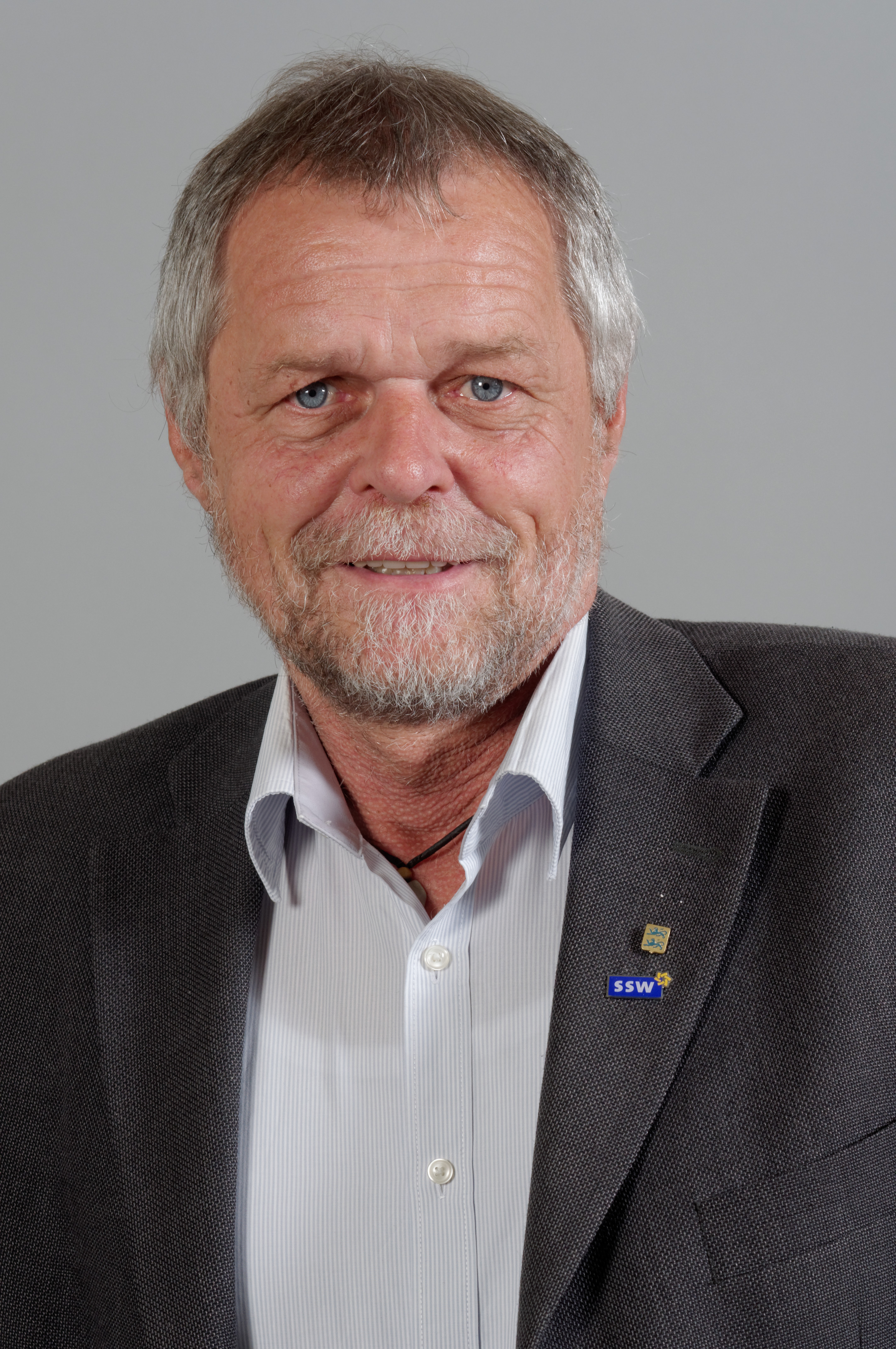
Meyer in 2013

Flemming Meyer (born 13 December 1951) is a German-Danish politician from the South Schleswig Voters' Association (SSW) and was a member of the Landtag of Schleswig-Holstein from 2009 to 2020.

== Early life ==
Meyer was born in Sønderborg, Denmark.

== Political career ==
In 2020, he left the state parliament and was replaced by Christian Dirschauer.
