= Christian Dirschauer =

German politician

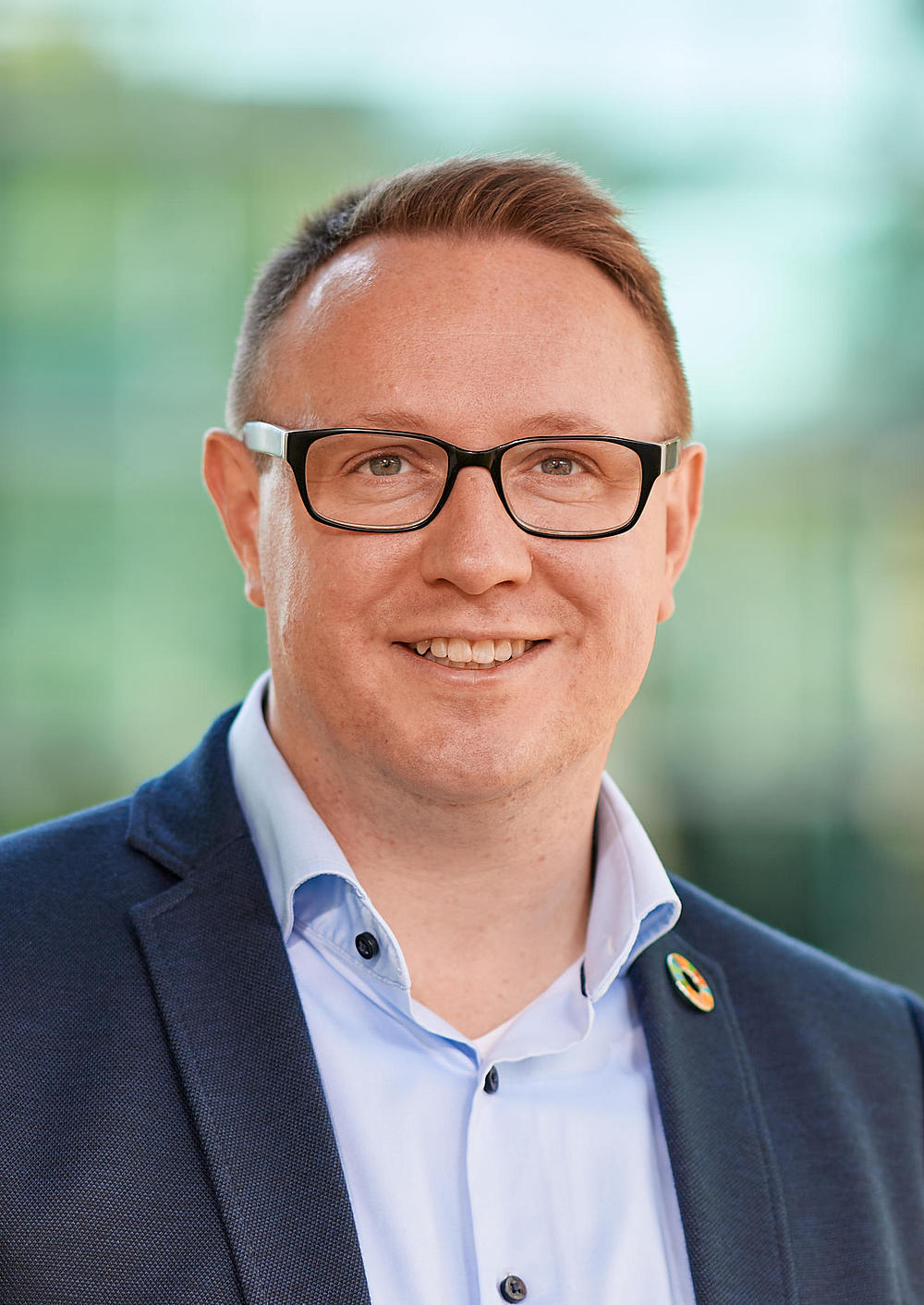

Chairman of the South Schleswig Voters' Association
- Incumbent
- Assumed office October 23, 2021
- Vice Chairmen: Sybilla Lena Nitsch; Svend Wippich
- Preceded by: Flemming Meyer

Member of the Landtag of Schleswig-Holstein
- Incumbent
- Assumed office August 3, 2020

Personal details
- Born: 13 May 1981 (age 44) Flensburg, West Germany
- Party: South Schleswig Voters' Association

Christian Dirschauer (born 13 May 1981) is a German politician. He has been a member of the Landtag of Schleswig-Holstein since 2020, and has been chairman of the South Schleswig Voters' Association since 2021.

== Early life ==
Dirschauer was born in Flensburg to a family of the Danish minority in Germany.

== Political career ==
In 2020 he replaced Flemming Meyer in the state parliament. In the 2022 state election, he entered the state parliament again via the state list of the SSW.
