= Martin Habersaat =

German politician (born 1977)

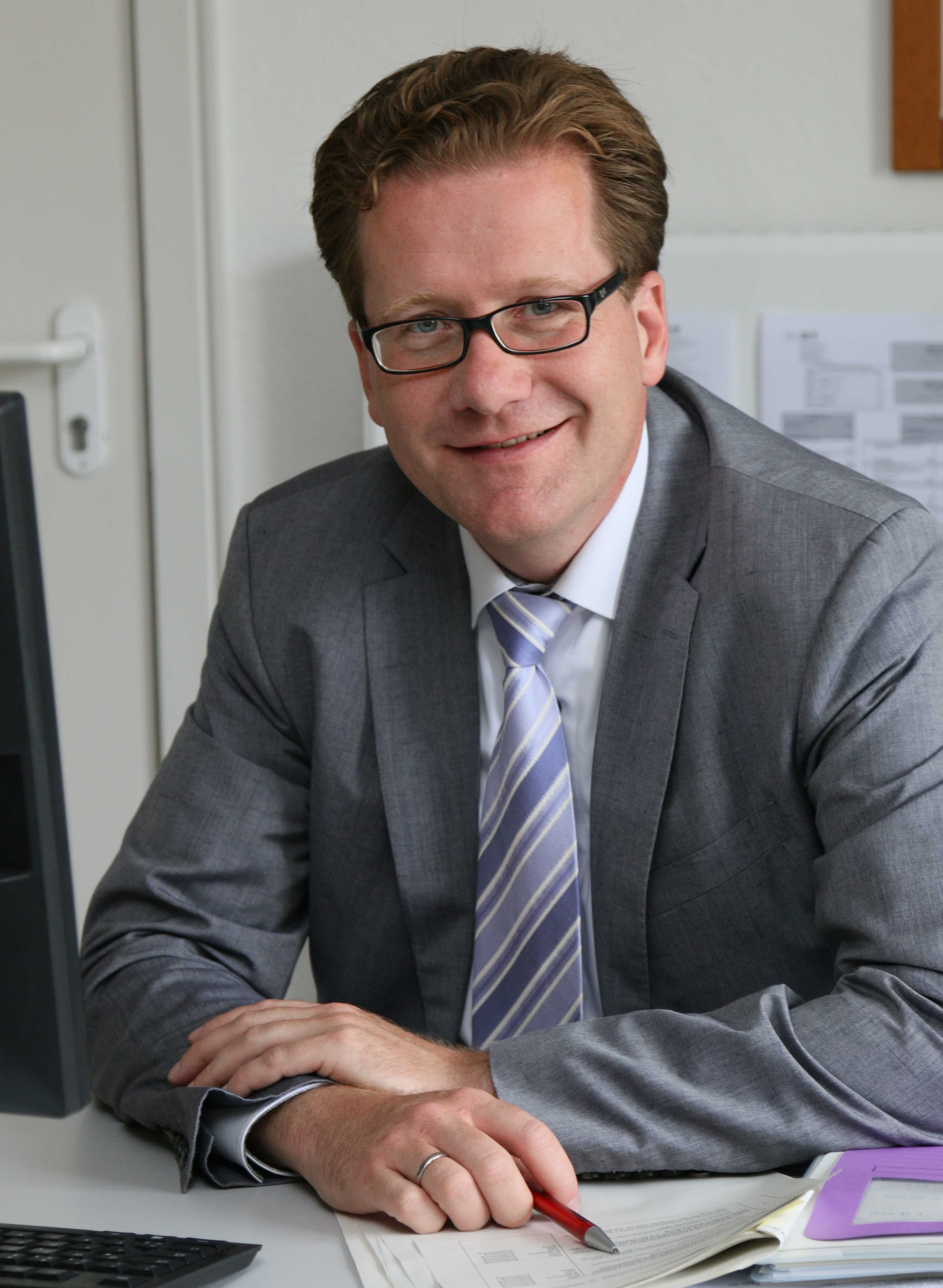
- Habersaat in 2017

Member of the Landtag of Schleswig-Holstein
- Incumbent
- Assumed office 27 October 2009
- Constituency: Stormarn-Süd (2012–2017)

Personal details
- Born: 18 February 1977 (age 49) Hamburg
- Party: Social Democratic Party (since 1998)

Martin Habersaat (born 18 February 1977 in Hamburg) is a German politician serving as a member of the Landtag of Schleswig-Holstein since 2009. From 2004 to 2012, he served as chairman of the Social Democratic Party in Stormarn.
