= Hermann Clausen =

German politician (1885–1962)

Member of the Bundestag
- In office 7 September 1949 – 7 September 1953

Personal details
- Born: 24 July 1885 Eggebek
- Died: 12 April 1962 (aged 76)
- Party: FU

Hermann Clausen (24 July 1885 – 12 April 1962) was a German politician of the Federalist Union and former SSW member of the German Bundestag.

== Life ==
On 2 December 1946 Clausen became a member of the second appointed state parliament in Schleswig-Holstein and, after the state elections in Schleswig-Holstein in 1947 to 1950, of the state parliament of Schleswig-Holstein. From 1949 to 1953 he was also a member of the German Bundestag. He was elected via the SSW-Landesliste Schleswig-Holstein.

== Literature ==
Herbst, Ludolf; Jahn, Bruno (2002). Vierhaus, Rudolf (ed.). Biographisches Handbuch der Mitglieder des Deutschen Bundestages. 1949–2002 [Biographical Handbook of the Members of the German Bundestag. 1949–2002] (in German). München: De Gruyter - De Gruyter Saur. p. 1715. ISBN 978-3-11-184511-1.
