= Björn Engholm =

German politician (born 1939)

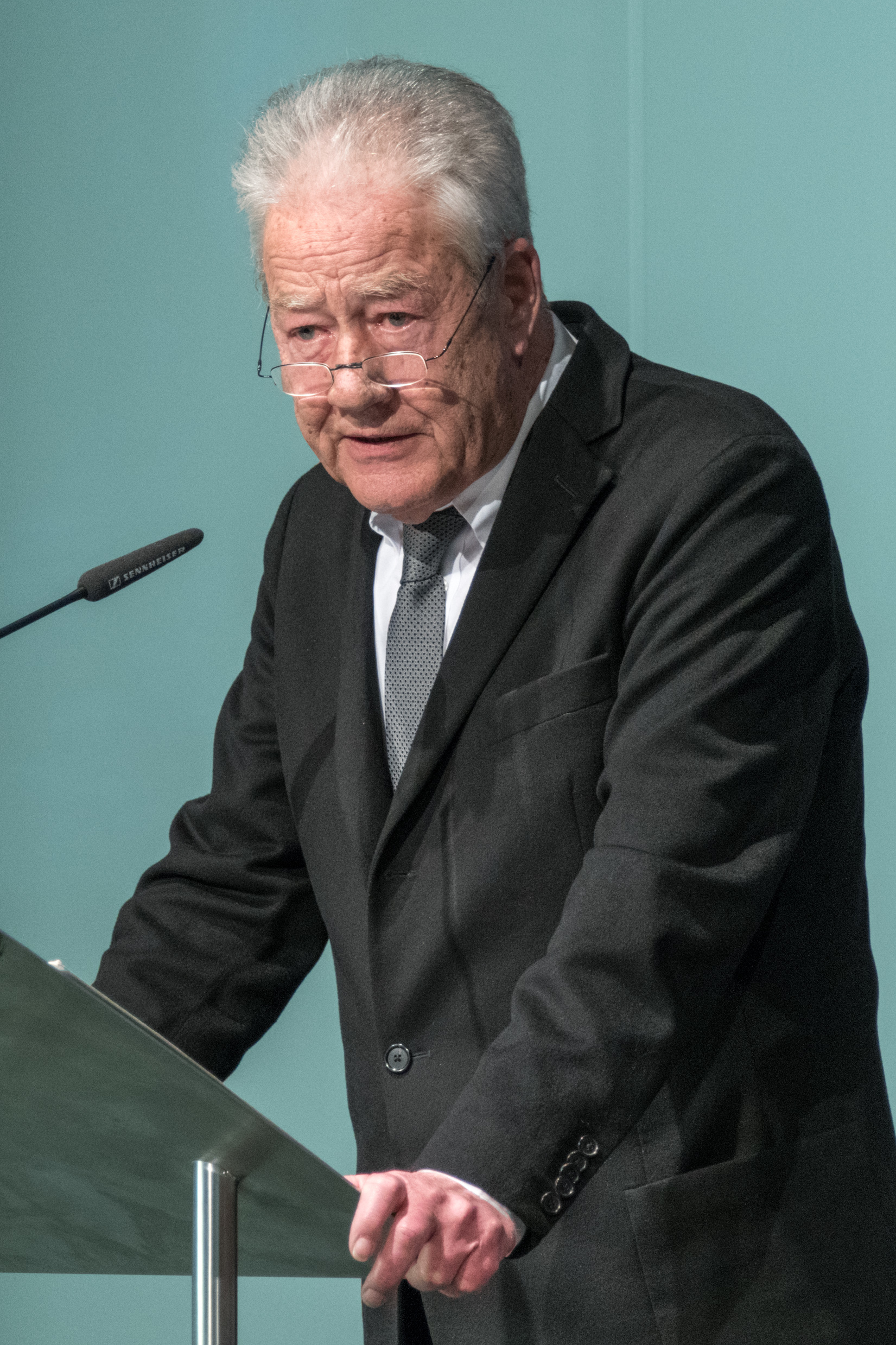
- Engholm in 2019

Leader of the Social Democratic Party
- In office 29 May 1991 – 3 May 1993
- Federal Manager: Anke Fuchs; Karlheinz Blessing
- Preceded by: Hans-Jochen Vogel
- Succeeded by: Johannes Rau (interim)

Minister-President of Schleswig-Holstein
- In office 31 May 1988 – 3 May 1993
- Deputy: Marianne Tidick; Eva Rühmkorf; Günther Jansen; Heide Simonis
- Preceded by: Henning Schwarz (interim)
- Succeeded by: Heide Simonis

President of the Bundesrat
- In office 1 November 1988 – 31 October 1989
- First Vice President: Bernhard Vogel
- Preceded by: Bernhard Vogel
- Succeeded by: Walter Momper

Leader of the Opposition in the Landtag of Schleswig-Holstein
- In office 12 April 1983 – 31 May 1988
- Minister-President: Uwe Barschel; Henning Schwarz (interim)
- Preceded by: Klaus Matthiesen
- Succeeded by: Heiko Hoffmann

Leader of the Social Democratic Party in the Landtag of Schleswig-Holstein
- In office 12 April 1983 – 31 May 1988
- Preceded by: Klaus Matthiesen
- Succeeded by: Gert Börnsen
Schmidt cabinet
Minister of Education and Science
In office 28 January 1981 – 1 October 1982
Chancellor	Helmut Schmidt
Preceded by	Jürgen Schmude
Succeeded by	Dorothee Wilms
Parliamentary State Secretary in the Ministry of Education and Science
In office 18 May 1977 – 28 January 1981
Chancellor	Helmut Schmidt
Minister	Helmut Rohde; Jürgen Schmude
Preceded by	Peter Glotz
Succeeded by	Eckart Kuhlwein
Parliamentary constituencies
Member of the Landtag of Schleswig-Holstein
In office 12 April 1983 – 7 November 1994
Preceded by	multi-member district
Succeeded by	Wolfgang Herrmann
Constituency	Social Democratic List
Member of the Bundestag for Lübeck
In office 20 October 1969 – 29 March 1983
Preceded by	Helmut Wendelborn
Succeeded by	Reinhold Hiller

Personal details
- Born: 9 November 1939 (age 86) Lübeck-Moisling, Province of Schleswig-Holstein, Free State of Prussia, Nazi Germany (now Germany)
- Party: Social Democratic Party (1962–)
- Spouse: Barbara Engholm (m. 1964)
- Children: 2
- Education: University of Hamburg
- Occupation: Politician; Typographer; Docent

Björn Engholm (born 9 November 1939) is a German politician of the Social Democratic Party (SPD). He was Federal Minister for Education and Science from 1981 to 1982, and in 1982 also Federal Minister for Food, Agriculture and Forests. From 1988 to 1993 he was the Minister-President of Schleswig-Holstein and from 1991 to 1993 the leader of the Social Democratic Party.

Engholm was educated at University of Hamburg. He was elected Minister-President of Schleswig-Holstein in 1988, in the wake of the Barschel affair/Waterkantgate: he had been spied on and was a victim of severe defamation (HIV infection, tax evasion, etc.) by the Barschel campaign. The Social Democrats won an impressive 54.2% (up almost 10%) and gained an absolute majority for the first time ever. Engholm served as President of the Bundesrat in 1988/89.

While Engholm was popular with the electorate, he was forced to resign as party leader and Minister-President in 1993 after discrepancies surfaced over the testimonies he gave in the Barschel affair (Schubladenaffäre, drawer affair). A party official had paid 50,000 Deutsche Mark (kept in a kitchen drawer) to the spy of the Barschel affair to keep the espionage a secret for several weeks, to reveal the scandal on election weekend with a bigger impact and then present Engholm as a victim.

He was succeeded by Rudolf Scharping as party chairman and by Heide Simonis as Minister-President.

Since 1964, Engholm has been married to painter Barbara Engholm (born 1940); they have two daughters.

== See also ==
- List of minister-presidents of Schleswig-Holstein

Party political offices
Preceded by Hans-Jochen Vogel	Chairman of the Social Democratic Party of Germany; 1991–1993	Succeeded by Rudolf Scharping
