= Helmut Lemke =

German politician (1907–1990)

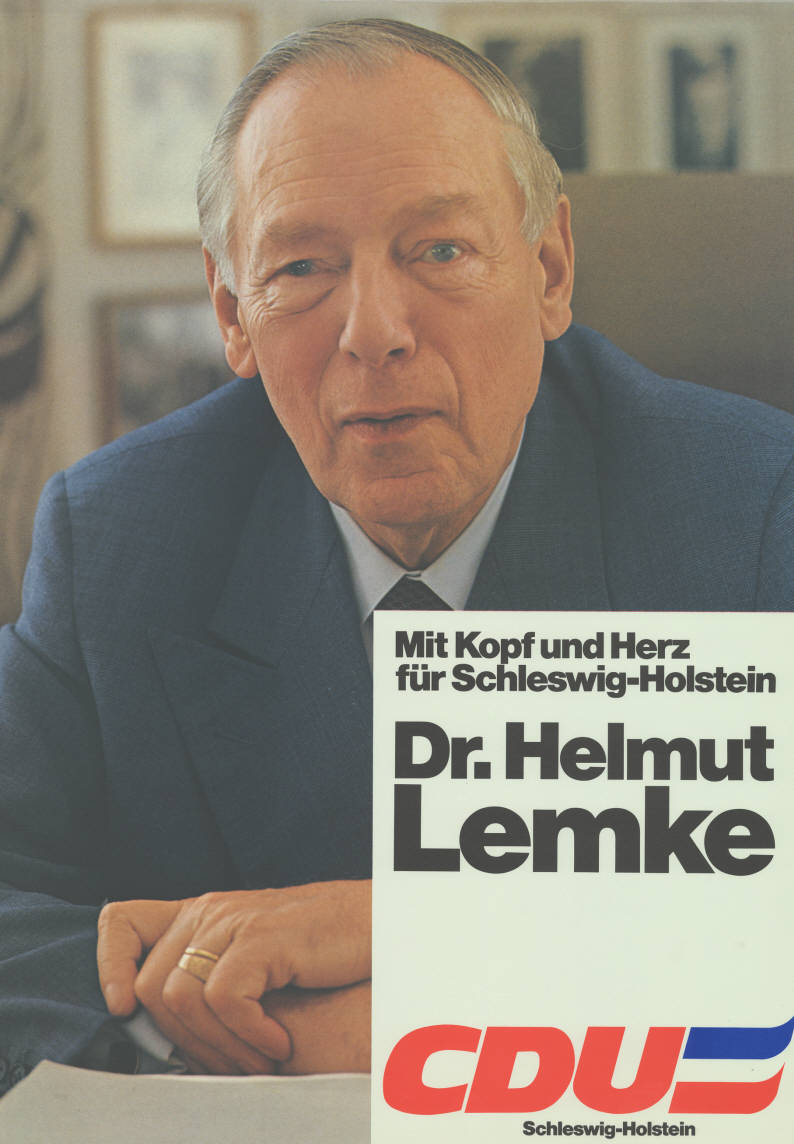
Lemke in 1979

Helmut Lemke (29 September 1907 in Kiel; 15 April 1990 in Lübeck) was a German politician of the NSDAP and CDU, and Minister-President of Schleswig-Holstein (1963–1971). He was born in Kiel and died in Lübeck.

Preceded by Paul Rohloff	President of the Landtag of Schleswig-Holstein; 1971–1983	Succeeded by Rudolf Titzck
