= South Schleswig Voters' Association =

South Schleswig Voters' Association German: Südschleswigscher Wählerverband Danish: Sydslesvigsk Vælgerforening North Frisian: Söödschlaswiksche Wäälerferbånd
- Abbreviation: SSW
- Chairman: Christian Dirschauer
- Vice Chairmen: Sybilla Lena Nitsch, Svend Wippich
- National Secretary: Martin Lorenzen
- Founded: 30 June 1948
- Split from: South Schleswig Association
- Headquarters: Norderstraße 76; 24939 Flensburg
- Newspaper: Stimme des Nordens
- Youth wing: Youth in the SSW
- Membership (2020): 3,216
- Ideology: Regionalism; Danish minority interests; Frisian minority interests; Social liberalism
- European affiliation: European Free Alliance
- Colours: Blue; Yellow
- Bundestag (Schleswig-Holstein seats): 1 / 25
- Bundesrat: 0 / 69
- European Parliament: 0 / 96
- Landtag of Schleswig-Holstein: 4 / 69
- Kiel City Council: 4 / 49
- Flensburg City Council: 11 / 43

Party flag

Website
- ssw.de

The South Schleswig Voters' Association (Note: Other translations include South Schleswig Voter Alliance, South Schleswig Voters' Committee, South Schleswig Voter Federation, South Schleswig Voters Group, South Schleswig Voters League, South Schleswig Voters List, South Schleswig Voters' Union, South Schleswig Electoral Association.) (German: Südschleswigscher Wählerverband, SSW; Danish: Sydslesvigsk Vælgerforening, SSV) is a regionalist political party in Schleswig-Holstein in northern Germany. The party represents the Danish and Frisian minorities of the state.

As a party representing a national minority, the SSW declines to identify itself with a scale of left–right politics but models its policies on the Nordic model, which often means favouring a strong welfare state, while favouring a more free-market labour policy than the German social market economy model. In 2011 it was defined as socially liberal by multiple authors. The SSW is represented in the Landtag of Schleswig-Holstein and several regional and municipal councils. The party contested federal elections in Germany until 1961, before returning in 2021, where it obtained one seat, and in 2025, where it once again obtained a seat in the Bundestag.

As a party for the national Danish minority in Southern Schleswig, the SSW is not subject to the general requirement of passing a 5% vote threshold to gain proportional seats in either the state parliament (Landtag) or the federal German parliament (Bundestag). However, the party is not guaranteed representation and must still win enough votes to qualify for a seat. In the most recent 2022 state election, the SSW received 5.7% of the votes and four seats. In the 2021 federal elections, the SSW stood in a federal election for the first time since 1961; the official final result gave them one seat, making Stefan Seidler a Member of Parliament, their first such member since the 1953 federal elections.

== History ==
In the 2005 state election, the SSW received 3.6% (two seats). This was enough for the SSW to hold the balance of power between the national parties of the left and right, and the SSW chose to support a coalition of the Social Democratic Party of Germany (SPD) and The Greens, without joining the coalition itself. This resulted in criticism from the Christian Democratic Union (CDU) and from German national conservative circles, who asserted that since the SSW had been granted a special status, it was obliged to defend only minority interests, and that its status should be revoked if the SSW behaved like a "regular" party. The SSW representatives, however, insisted on the full value of their parliamentary seats and their equal rights as German citizens. One particular point was that the SSW had taken a strong position on educational principles in the state, advocating for abolishing the traditional German system of dividing pupils according to academic ability after the 4th grade (approximately aged 10 years old) into different types of secondary schools. The CDU argued that since there were separate Danish-language schools, it was unreasonable for the SSW to involve itself in the affairs of the public schools.

As the planned SPD-Greens coalition did not make it into office after the 2009 state election, a centre-right coalition was formed between the CDU and Free Democratic Party (FDP), and the SSW joined the opposition.

In the 2012 state election, the SSW gained 4.6% of all votes and three seats in the state Landtag. A coalition of the SPD, Greens and SSW was concluded in June 2012, and the former parliamentary leader, Anke Spoorendonk, was appointed Minister for Culture, Justice and European Affairs. This was the first time in German history that a minority party had participated in a state government. The new coalition government had plenty of nicknames, for instance "Dänen-Ampel" ("Dane-traffic light"), "Schleswig-Holstein-Ampel", "rot-grün-blaue Koalition" or "rød-grøn-blå koalition" (red–green–blue alliance), "Küstenkoalition" (Coastal alliance) and "Nord-Ampel" (North traffic light).

In the 2017 state election, the SSW backed to 3.3% of the votes, but retained three seats in the Landtag. However, since the government coalition parties lost their Landtag majority, a new government was formed without the SSW, which again joined the opposition. Exempt from the threshold of 5%, it won a seat in the 2021 German federal election with 0.1% of the vote nationwide, its first federal seat since the inaugural 1949 West German federal election. Though unlikely to change the balance of power in any way, Stefan Seidler sits as its Member of the German Bundestag.

In the 2022 state election, the SSW again ran with Lars Harms as its top candidate. With 5.7%, the SSW achieved more than five percent of the vote for the first time since the state election in 1950. At the end of 2024, Lars Harms resigned from his state parliament mandate and retired from politics. Michael Schunck took his place in the state parliament. Christian Dirschauer took over the parliamentary group chairmanship in the state parliament. For the 2025 federal election, the SSW aims to defend its seat in the Bundestag and hopes to gain a second seat. The party expects to need around 40,000 votes for the first seat and a total of 110,000 votes (6% of the second votes in Schleswig-Holstein) for the second seat.

In the 2025 German federal election they held their seat from the previous election, putting them in sixth place in terms of seats in the Bundestag.

== SSWUngdom ==
The Youth in the SSW (Danish: SSWUngdom, German: Jugend im SSW) is the youth wing of the South Schleswig Voter Federation. The current chairman is Maylis Roßberg.

== Election results ==
=== Federal parliament (Bundestag) ===
Election	Leader	Constituency			Party list			Seats	+/–	Status
Election	Leader	Votes	%		Votes	%		Seats	+/–	Status
Election	Leader	Votes	DE	SH	Votes	DE	SH	Seats	+/–	Status
1949	Hermann Clausen				75,388	0.3 (#12)	5.4 (#5)	1 / 402		Opposition
1953	Hermann Clausen	44,339	0.2 (#13)	3.3 (#6)	44,585	0.2 (#13)	3.3 (#6)	0 / 509	▼1	No seats
1957	Hermann Clausen	33,463	0.1 (#10)	2.5 (#6)	32,262	0.1 (#11)	2.5 (#6)	0 / 519	Steady	No seats
1961	Berthold Bahnsen	24,951	0.1 (#8)	1.8 (#5)	25,449	0.1 (#9)	1.9 (#5)	0 / 521	Steady	No seats
Did not contest (1965–2017)
2021	Stefan Seidler	35,027	0.1 (#17)	2.0 (#7)	55,578	0.1 (#17)	3.2 (#7)	1 / 736	▲1	Opposition
2025	Stefan Seidler	58,773	0.1 (#14)	3.1 (#6)	76,126	0.1 (#15)	4.0 (#6)	1 / 630	Steady	Opposition

=== Landtag of Schleswig-Holstein ===
Election	Leader	Votes	%	Seats	+/–	Status
1947	Samuel Münchow	99,500	9.3%	6 / 70	▲6	Opposition
1950	Samuel Münchow	71,864	5.5%	4 / 69	▼2	Opposition
1954	Samuel Münchow	42,242	3.5 %	0 / 69	▼4	Opposition
1958	Berthold Bahnsen	34,136	2.8%	2 / 69	▲2	Opposition
1962	Berthold Bahnsen	26,883	2.3%	1 / 69	▼1	Opposition
1967	Berthold Bahnsen	23,577	1.9%	1 / 73	Steady	Opposition
1971	Berthold Bahnsen	19,720	1.4%	1 / 73	Steady	Opposition
1975	Karl Otto Meyer	20,703	1.4%	1 / 73	Steady	Opposition
1979	Karl Otto Meyer	22,293	1.4%	1 / 72	Steady	Opposition
1983	Karl Otto Meyer	21,807	1.3%	1 / 74	Steady	Opposition
1987	Karl Otto Meyer	23,316	1.5%	1 / 74	Steady	Opposition
1988	Karl Otto Meyer	26,643	1.7%	1 / 74	Steady	Opposition
1992	Karl Otto Meyer	28,245	1.9%	1 / 89	Steady	Opposition
1996	Anke Spoorendonk	38,285	2.5%	2 / 75	▲1	Opposition
2000	Anke Spoorendonk	60,367	4.1%	3 / 89	▲1	Opposition
2005	Anke Spoorendonk	51,920	3.6%	2 / 69	▼1	Opposition
2009	Anke Spoorendonk	69,701	4.3%	4 / 95	▲2	Opposition
2012	Anke Spoorendonk	61,025	4.6%	3 / 69	▼1	SPD-Greens-SSW
2017	Lars Harms	48,968	3.3%	3 / 73	Steady	Opposition
2022	Lars Harms	78,969	5.7%	4 / 69	▲1	Opposition

== Leadership ==
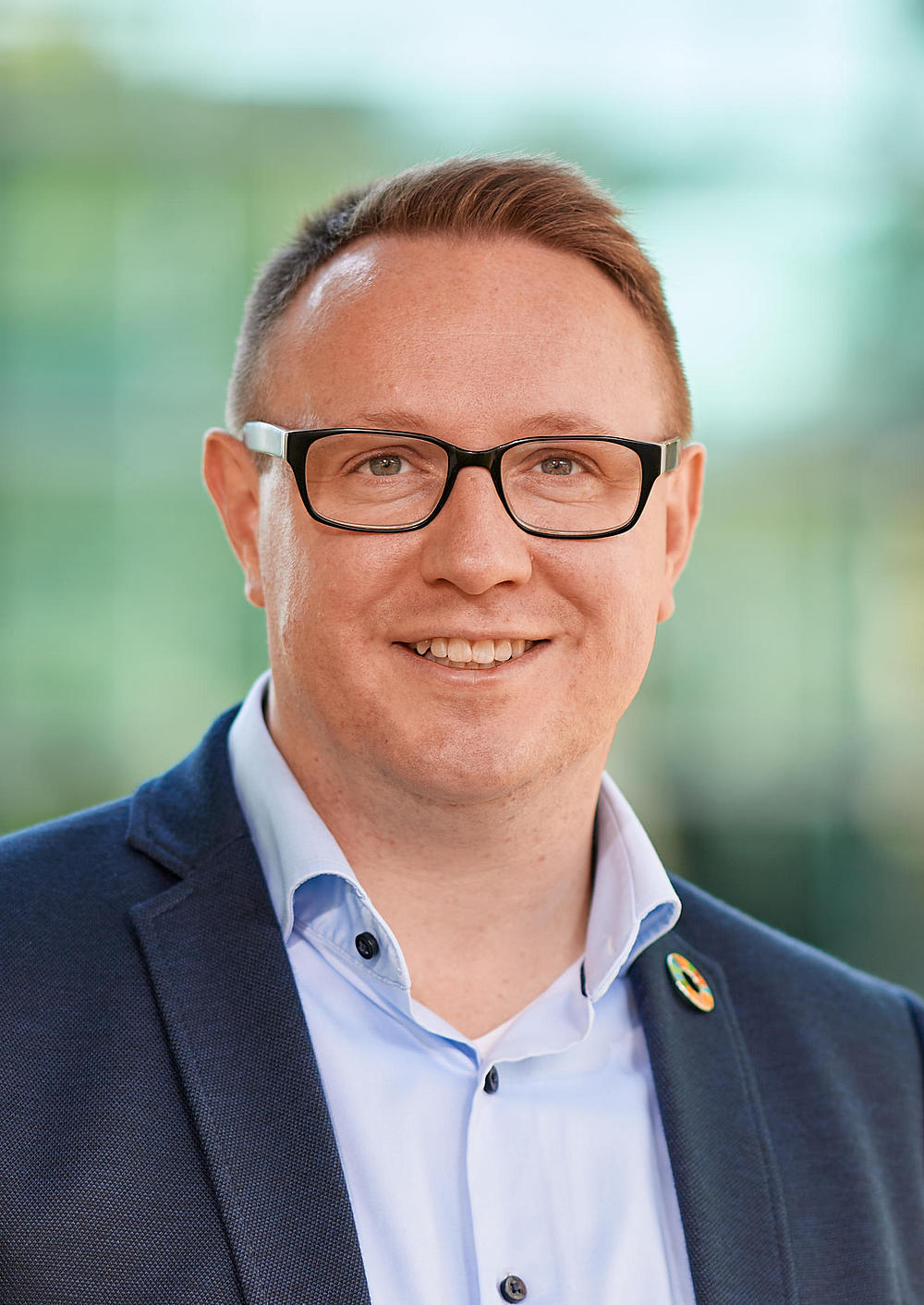
Christian Dirschauer is the party chairman of the SSW.

=== Leader of the SSW ===
Leader		Year
1	Svend Johannsen	1948–1949
2	Samuel Münchow	1949–1950
3	Hermann Clausen	1950–1956
4	Friedrich Mommsen	1956–1960
5	Karl Otto Meyer	1960–1975
6	Gerhard Wehlitz	1975–1989
7	Wilhelm Klüver	1989–1997
8	Gerda Eichhorn	1997–2005
9	Flemming Meyer	2005–2021
10	Christian Dirschauer	2021–present

== See also ==
Germany:

- 2005 Schleswig-Holstein state election
- 2012 Schleswig-Holstein state election
- 2022 Schleswig-Holstein state election
- Anke Spoorendonk
- German governing coalition
- Stefan Seidler
- Torsten Albig

Northern Schleswig before 1920:

- Danish Party

Denmark:

- April 1920 Danish Folketing election
- July 1920 Danish Folketing election
- Schleswig Party
- September 1920 Danish Folketing election
- 1920 Schleswig plebiscites
