= Beate Raudies =

German politician (born 1966)

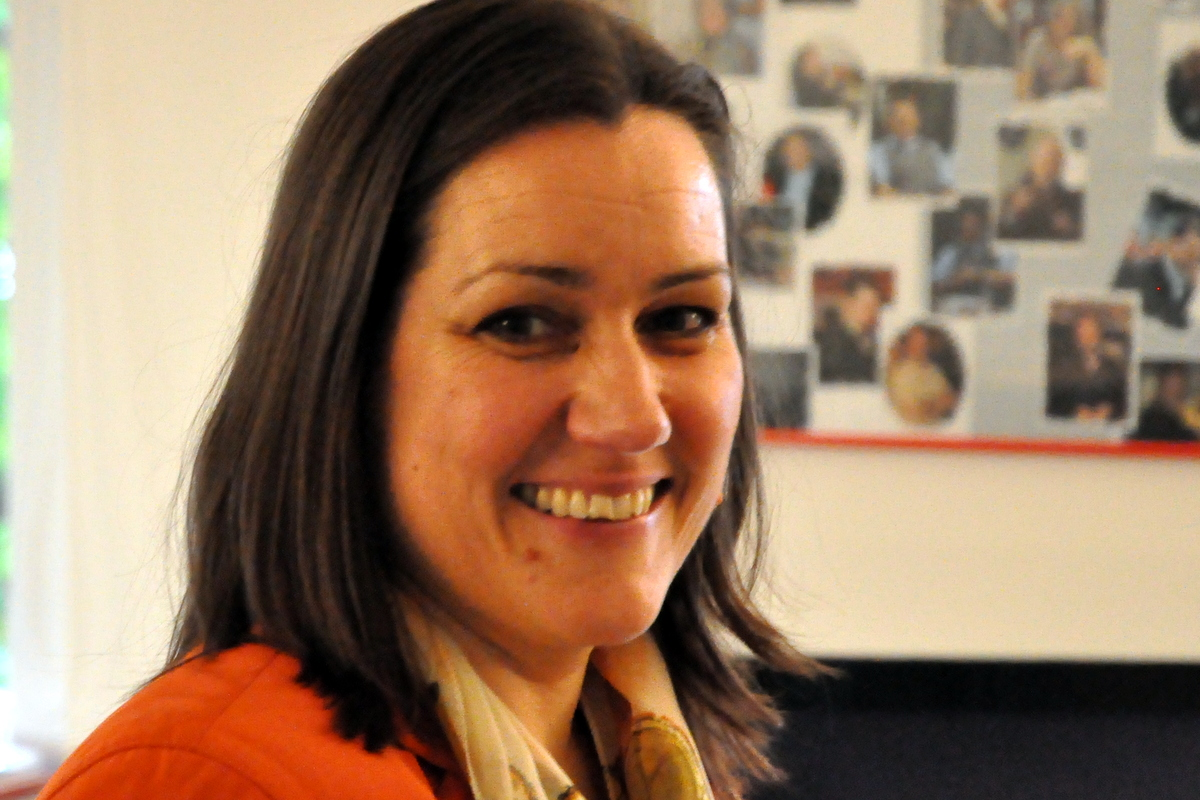
- Raudies in 2013

Member of the Landtag of Schleswig-Holstein
- Incumbent
- Assumed office 5 June 2012
- Preceded by: Michael von Abercron
- Constituency: Elmshorn (2012–2022)

Personal details
- Born: 1 September 1966 (age 59) Elmshorn
- Party: Social Democratic Party (since 1985)

Beate Raudies (born 1 September 1966 in Elmshorn) is a German politician serving as a member of the Landtag of Schleswig-Holstein since 2012. She has served as vice president of the Landtag since 2022.
