= Landtag of Schleswig-Holstein =

State legislature in Germany

Coordinates: 54.335°N 10.153°E

Landtag of Schleswig-Holstein Schleswig-Holsteinischer Landtag

Type
- Type: Landtag
- Established: 11 October 1868

Leadership
- President: Kristina Herbst, CDU since 18 May 2022
- Leader of the Opposition (Note: Unlike in all other states and at a federal level, the leader of the opposition is a formal office set out in the Schleswig-Holstein state constitution.): Serpil Midyatli, Social Democratic Party (SPD) since 12 December 2023
- Vice Presidents: Eka von Kalben, Greens since 7 June 2022
- Peter Lehnert, Christian Democratic Union of Germany (CDU) since 7 June 2022
- Beate Raudies, Social Democratic Party (SPD) since 7 June 2022
- Annabell Krämer, Free Democratic Party of Germany since 7 June 2022
- Jette Waldinger-Thiering, South Schleswig Voters' Association since 7 June 2022

Structure
- Seats: 69
- Political groups: Government (48) CDU (34) Greens (14) Opposition (21) SPD (12) FDP (5) SSW (4)

Elections
- Last election: 8 May 2022
- Next election: On or before 18 April 2027

Meeting place
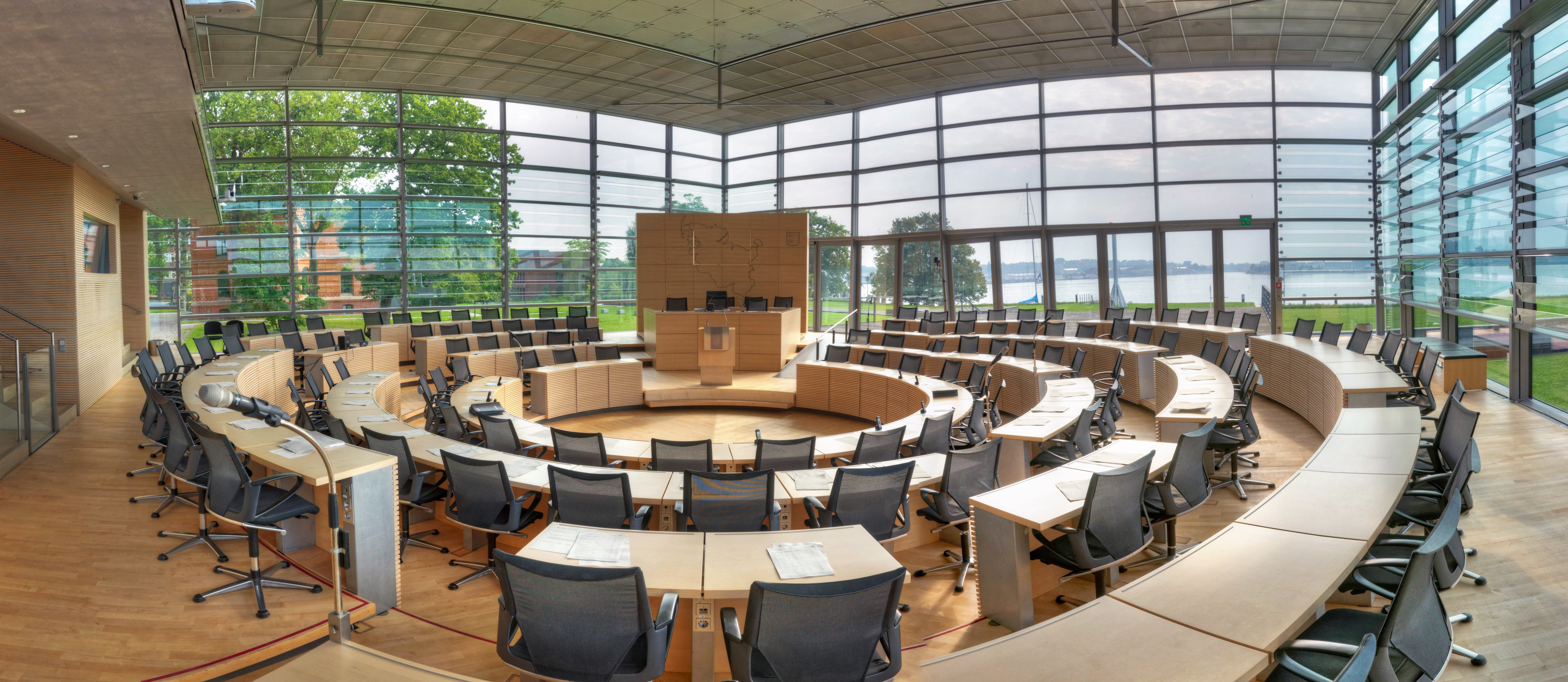
- Landeshaus, Kiel

Website
- landtag.ltsh.de

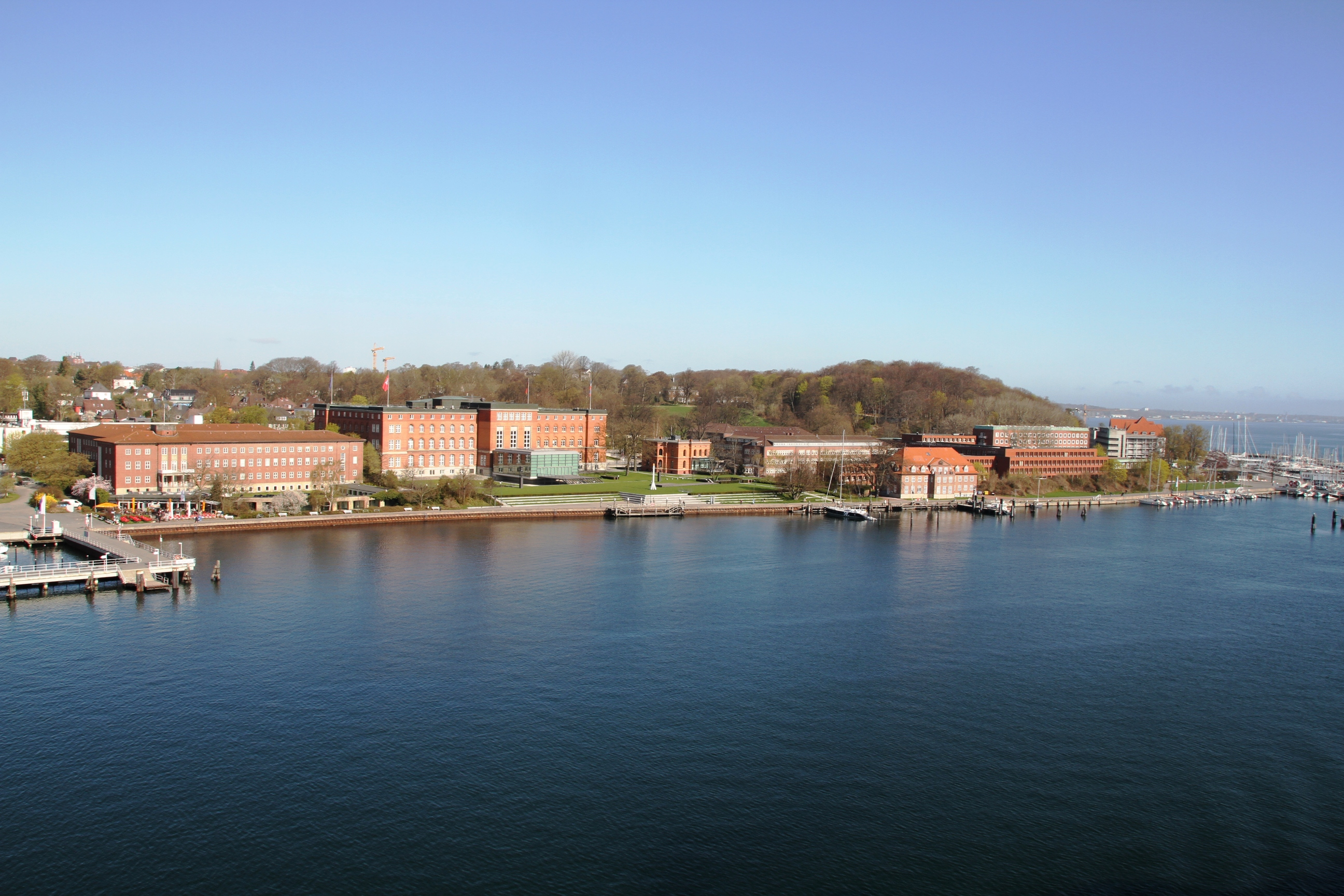
Aerial view

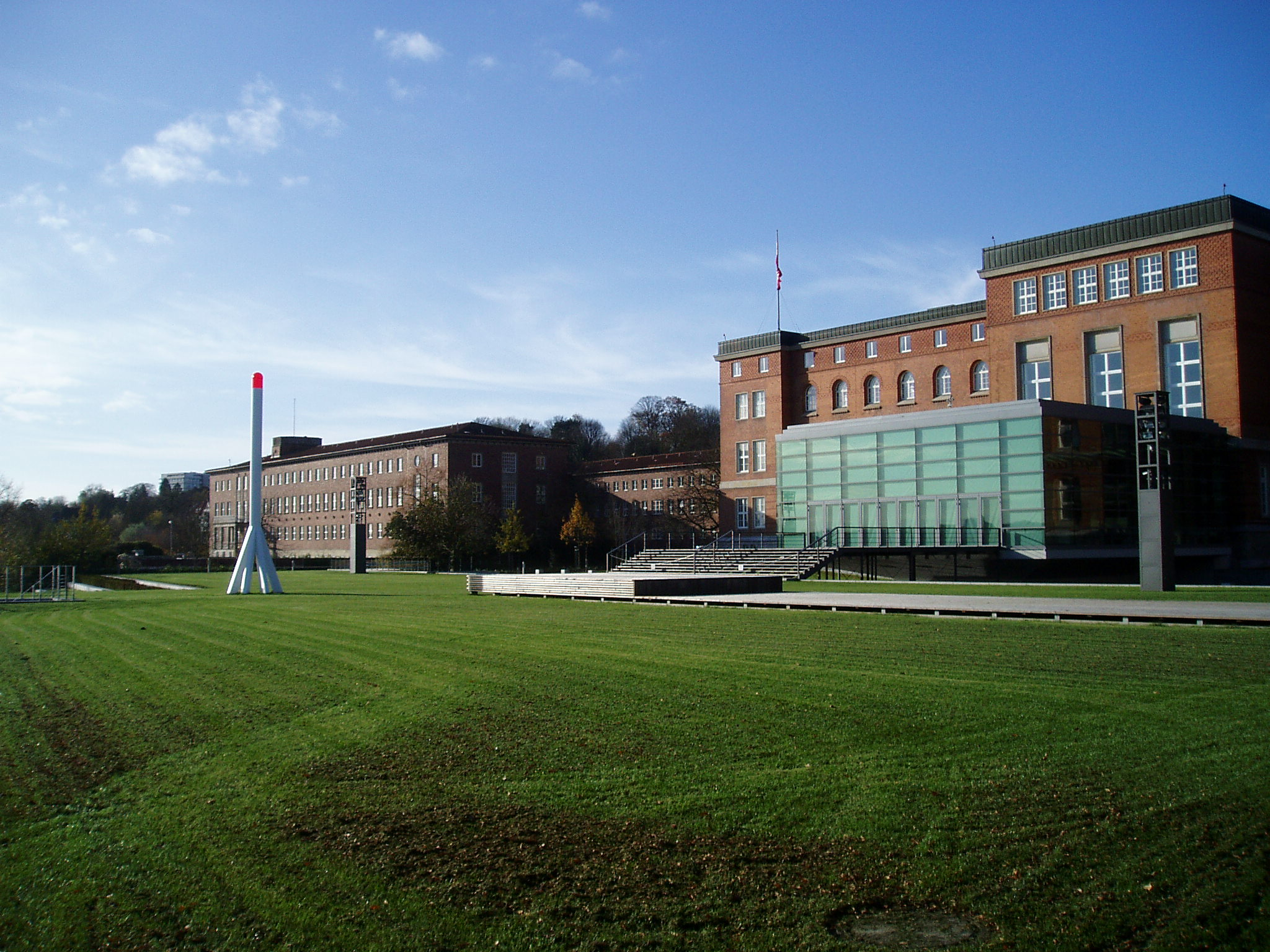
Landeshaus in Kiel, the seat of the Landtag

The Schleswig-Holstein Landtag is the state parliament of the German state of Schleswig-Holstein. It convenes in the state's capital Kiel and currently consists of 69 members of five parties. The current majority consists of a coalition of the Christian Democratic Union and the Greens, supporting the cabinet of Minister President Daniel Günther.

The Landtag maintains partnerships with the parliament of the West Pomeranian Voivodeship, the Oblast Duma of the Kaliningrad Oblast and the parliament of the Pomeranian Voivodeship.

== Location ==
Since 1950, the Landtag convenes in the Landeshaus in Kiel, which was built in 1888 as the Royal Marine Academy. During the Nazi era, the Landeshaus served as the seat of the German Navy's Baltic Sea Command. Up to 1950, the Landtag convened in Lübeck, Flensburg and Eckernförde as well as in Kiel. Since its renovation in 2003, the Landtag sits in a new chamber in the Landeshaus.

== Electoral system ==
The Landtag is elected via mixed-member proportional representation. 35 members are elected in single-member constituencies via first-past-the-post voting. 34 members are then allocated using compensatory proportional representation. Voters have two votes: the "first vote" for candidates in single-member constituencies, and the "second vote" for party lists, which are used to fill the proportional seats. The minimum size of the Landtag is 69 members, but if overhang seats are present, proportional leveling seats will be added to ensure proportionality. An electoral threshold of 5% of valid votes is applied to the Landtag; parties that fall below this threshold, and fail to win at least one constituency, are ineligible to receive seats. Parties representing the Danish minority of Southern Schleswig and the Frisians, such as the South Schleswig Voters' Association, are exempt from the threshold. However, they are not guaranteed representation, they must still win enough votes to qualify for at least one mandate (with 69 seats, this means 1/69, or about 1.4% of the vote).

== Presidents of the Landtag ==
So far, the presidents of the Landtag of Schleswig-Holstein have been:

| Image | Name | Party | Term start | Term end |
|---|---|---|---|---|
| | Paul Husfeldt | CDU | 1946 | 1946 |
| | Karl Ratz | SPD | 1946 | 1954 |
| | Walther Böttcher | CDU | 1954 | 1959 |
| | Claus-Joachim von Heydebreck | CDU | 1959 | 1964 |
| | Paul Rohloff | CDU | 1964 | 1971 |
| | Helmut Lemke | CDU | 1971 | 1983 |
| | Rudolf Titzck | CDU | 1983 | 1987 |
| | Lianne Paulina-Mürl | SPD | 1987 | 1992 |
| | Ute Erdsiek-Rave | SPD | 1992 | 1996 |
| | Heinz-Werner Arens | SPD | 1996 | 2005 |
| | Martin Kayenburg | CDU | 2005 | 2009 |
| | Torsten Geerdts | CDU | 2009 | 2012 |
| | Klaus Schlie | CDU | 2012 | 2022 |
| | Kristina Herbst | CDU | 7 June 2022 | Present |
