= Coastal Coalition (Germany) =

The parties involved

SPD (red)

Bündnis 90/Die Grünen (green)

SSW (blue)

The coastal coalition (German: Küstenkoalition), also known as the Schleswig-Holstein traffic light coalition or red-green-blue coalition (rarely also Gambia coalition) is a governing coalition between the SPD, the Greens and the party of the Danish and national Frisian minorities in Schleswig-Holstein, the South Schleswig Voters' Association (SSW). The SSW represents both the Danish and the part of the North Frisian ethnic group that considers itself a national minority in South Schleswig.

In the media, the coalition has also been called the "Danish traffic light coalition ." However, this term is controversial, as critics believe it appeals to old resentments against the Danish minority. The name is derived from "traffic light coalition," with the SSW replacing the FDP.

== State level ==
This model was first discussed after the 2005 state election in Schleswig-Holstein, in which the previously governing red-green coalition under SPD Minister-President Heide Simonis lost its majority in the state parliament. However, a black-yellow coalition under CDU leadership was also impossible. Thus, the SSW became the deciding factor and entered into exploratory talks with both the CDU and SPD. Anke Spoorendonk and Lars Harms ultimately decided to tolerate a red-green minority government. However, in the election of the Minister-President, a member of parliament from one of the three parties abstained, and Heide Simonis was no longer Minister-President. The SPD then entered into coalition negotiations with the CDU, whose candidate, Peter Harry Carstensen, subsequently became Minister-President.

Before the 2009 Schleswig-Holstein state election, a red-green-blue coalition was again under discussion. According to polls, such an alliance seemed likely to achieve a majority only if Die Linke was included . The SSW, however, ruled out an alliance with the Left Party. After the state elections, a Danish traffic light coalition, which would have been tolerated by the Left Party, failed to secure a majority.

In the 2012 state election campaign, the Danish traffic light coalition became a central slogan of the CDU as an alliance to be prevented. As in 2009, this campaign was criticized for promoting resentment against the Danish minority. After the 2012 state election in Schleswig-Holstein, the SPD, Alliance 90/The Greens and the SSW finally formed a Danish traffic light coalition at the state level for the first time in Schleswig-Holstein's history. The red-green-blue coalition only had a one-vote majority in the Landtag of Schleswig-Holstein. On 12 June, Torsten Albig of the SPD was elected Minister President with two more votes than the coalition had available. This was the first time that the party of the Danish minority participated in a state government and thus held a ministerial post. Anke Spoorendonk of the SSW took over the Ministry of Justice, Europe and Culture in the Albig cabinet. At the same time, Spoorendonk was Second Deputy Minister President Torsten Albig.

== Municipal level ==
At the municipal level, there was a constellation comparable to the coastal coalition in the Kiel City Council from 2013 to 2017 with the red-green-blue city hall cooperation.
