= German governing coalition =

Potential governing alliances in Germany

Composition of German states' governing coalitions as of 2026.

Breakdown of seats in the 21st Bundestag, elected in the 2025 German federal election. From left to right, the parties are: The Left (Die Linke) Social Democratic Party of Germany (SPD) Alliance 90/The Greens South Schleswig Voters' Association (SSW) Christian Democratic Union/Christian Social Union (CDU/CSU) Alternative for Germany (AfD)

In Germany's federal electoral system, a single party or parliamentary group rarely wins an absolute majority of seats in the Bundestag, and thus coalition governments, rather than single-party governments, are the usually expected outcome of a German election. As German political parties are often associated with particular colors, coalitions are frequently given nicknames based on the colors included. Prominent political parties in Germany are the CDU/CSU (black), the SPD (red), the Greens (green), the Left (red, or alternatively magenta to distinguish from the SPD), the AfD (blue), and the FDP (yellow).

== History ==
Since the founding of the Federal Republic of Germany in 1949, the country has traditionally used proportional representation both at the federal level and in the states. Because a multi-party system has emerged with two major parties (CDU/CSU and SPD) and a number of smaller parties that are nevertheless frequently represented in parliaments (Greens, FDP, Left, and AfD), single-party governments with absolute majorities are quite rare.

At the federal level, a single-party government has occurred only once so far. Between 1957 and 1961, the CDU/CSU held an absolute majority in the Bundestag and was able to govern alone (Third Adenauer cabinet); even then, the minor German Party was included in the government for the first three years of its existence, and the government was not a fully single-faction cabinet until those ministers joined the CDU in July 1960. In the states, single-party governments have been quite rare, with the exception of the Free State of Bavaria, where the CSU has many times been able to achieve absolute majorities in state elections. As of January 2024, only one of Germany's 16 states—Saarland—has a single-party government, led solely by the SPD.

There are two two-party coalitions usually preferred for reasons of ideological proximity; the centre-right black-yellow coalition (CDU/CSU and FDP) and the center-left red-green coalition (SPD and Greens). A third type of two-party-coalition, which occurs especially after inconclusive election results, is the grand coalition of the two larger parties CDU/CSU and SPD. Such coalitions are rare due to the ideological difference between the two but have become more common in the 21st century, with three of Angela Merkel's four governments being grand coalitions. Parties frequently make statements ahead of elections about which coalitions they categorically reject.

In Germany, coalitions rarely consist of more than two parties (CDU and CSU, two allies which on the federal level always form the CDU/CSU caucus, count as a single party). Starting in the 2010s, coalitions at the state level increasingly have included three parties, often the FDP, Greens, and one of the major parties, or "red-red-green" coalitions of the SPD, the Left, and the Greens. As of 2017, the Greens have joined governments on the state level in ten coalitions in seven various combinations.

The Danish and Frisian minorities of Schleswig-Holstein have their own ethnic party, called the South Schleswig Voters' Association (SSW). In state politics, a coalition between the SPD, Greens, and SSW, is called the coastal coalition, or Gambia coalition because these parties' colors (including the SSW's dark blue) match the flag of the Gambia. Such a coalition was in power between 2012 and 2017 under minister president Torsten Albig. In December 2021, following the 2021 German federal election held on 26 September, a traffic light coalition (SPD, FDP, and Greens) led by Olaf Scholz took power in Germany, the first time a three-party coalition had formed at the federal level.

=== Übergroß coalitions ===
Übergroß coalitions (übergroß meaning extra large) are coalitions that include more parties than mathematically necessary for a majority. The parties are generally reluctant to join coalitions where they are not mathematically needed towards a majority. Übergroß coalitions are usually formed in times of crisis, or when the coalition parties deem it necessary for other reasons.

Such a coalition may be assembled when a supermajority is needed, such as for making constitutional amendments. For this reason, they were common during the early days of the Federal Republic. At the federal level, they were formed twice: second Adenauer cabinet, where CDU/CSU came just one seat short of majority and could have formed a coalition with just one party but chose to form a coalition with three (FDP, DP and GB/BHE), and the aforementioned Adenauer III). At the state level, the last time until 2021 that such a coalition was formed was in Hamburg following the 1970 elections, where the SPD alone held a 10-seat majority but still chose to go into coalition with the FDP.

Alternatively, an übergroß coalition may be created to avoid problems stemming from an undisciplined parliamentary groups, where too narrow a majority carries a strong risk of failure. For example, following the 2021 Saxony-Anhalt state election, a grand coalition would have held a one-seat majority but Minister President Reiner Haseloff (CDU) also chose to include the FDP and form a Germany coalition. When the Landtag of Saxony-Anhalt met to elect a minister president, he unexpectedly failed to get elected on the first ballot, falling just one vote short, which was attributed to right-wing dissent within his party. He was elected on the second ballot.

== Possible governing combinations ==
Coalition name	Coalition leader	Other coalition parties			State and federal examples
Coalitions currently in power
Black–green coalition (Kiwi coalition, or GrüKo)	CDU/CSU	The Greens			Baden-Württemberg (2026) (Note: Inverted coalition composition, where the Greens are the coalition leader, and the CDU is the junior partner. Both parties have 56 seats each.); North Rhine-Westphalia (2022); Schleswig-Holstein (2022)
Black–orange coalition (Spezi, or papaya coalition)	CDU/CSU	Free Voters/ BVB/FW			Bavaria (2023)
Germany coalition	CDU/CSU	SPD	FDP		Saxony-Anhalt (2021)
Grand coalition (GroKo, Black-Red, or Red-Black coalition)	CDU/CSU	SPD			Bundestag (2025); Berlin (2023 repeat); Brandenburg (2026 reshuffle) (Note: Inverted coalition composition, where the SPD is the coalition leader with 34 seats, and the CDU is the junior partner with 12 seats.); Hesse (2023); Rhineland-Palatinate (2026); Saxony (2024)
Red–green coalition	SPD	The Greens			Lower Saxony (2022); Hamburg (2025)
Red–red–green coalition	SPD	The Left	The Greens		Bremen (2023); Mecklenberg-Vorpommern (2026)
Other coalitions
Blackberry coalition	CDU/CSU	SPD	BSW		Thuringia (2024)
Black-orange-yellow coalition	CDU/CSU	Free Voters/ BVB/FW	FDP		None
Black-yellow coalition (Christian-liberal, Tigerenten, or bürgerliche coalition)	CDU/CSU	FDP			Bundestag (2009); North Rhine-Westphalia (2017)
Farm coalition	SPD	The Greens	Free Voters/ BVB/FW		None
Fig coalition	SPD	BSW	The Greens		None
Grape coalition	SPD	The Left	The Greens	Volt	None
Green–yellow coalition (lime, or citrus coalition)	The Greens	FDP			None
Jamaica coalition (black traffic light coalition)	CDU/CSU	The Greens	FDP		Saarland (2009); Schleswig-Holstein (2017)
Kenya coalition (Afghanistan coalition)	CDU/CSU	SPD	The Greens		Saxony-Anhalt (2016); Brandenburg (2019); Saxony (2019)
Mango coalition (Rainbow Coalition)	SPD	FDP	The Greens	Free Voters/ BVB/FW	None
Maracuja coalition	CDU/CSU	FDP	The Greens	Volt	None
Red–purple coalition (magenta coalition)	SPD	BSW			Brandenburg (2024)
Red–red coalition	SPD	The Left			Mecklenburg-Vorpommern (2021)
Social–liberal coalition	SPD	FDP			Bundestag (1980); Rhineland-Palatinate (2001)
Traffic light coalition	SPD	FDP	The Greens		Bundestag (2021); Rhineland-Palatinate (2021)
Zimbabwe coalition (Ghana coalition)	CDU/CSU	SPD	FDP	The Greens	None
Coalition below is only applicable to Schleswig-Holstein
Coastal Coalition (Danish traffic light, or Gambia coalition)	SPD	The Greens	SSW		Schleswig-Holstein (2012)
Coalitions below are considered unlikely due to a cordon sanitaire
Bahamas coalition	CDU/CSU	FDP	AfD		See: 2020 Thuringia crisis (2019)
Black–blue coalition (midnight coalition)	CDU/CSU	AfD			None
Indigo coalition	AfD	BSW			None; See also: Querfront
Blood sausage coalition	CDU/CSU	SPD	The Left		None
Raspberry coalition	CDU/CSU	SPD	The Left	BSW	None
Ukraine coalition	FDP	AfD			None

=== Hypothetical coalitions involving the AfD ===
Due to the cordon sanitaire (usually called firewall, or Brandmauer in Germany) all other parties have established against AfD, hypothetical coalitions involving the AfD are rarely discussed. A coalition of CDU/CSU, AfD, and FDP would have had a majority in the 20th Bundestag elected in 2021; (Note: Prior to the repeat election in Berlin, 369 seats were needed for a majority. CDU/CSU 197, FDP 92, AfD 83, total 372 seats.) it was not seriously discussed publicly by either media or politicians due to the cordon sanitaire. This hypothetical coalition has been described as the "Bahamas coalition", in reference to the colors of the flag of the Bahamas, as early as 2013. Following the 2019 Thuringian state election, the election of Thomas Kemmerich by members of the three parties sparked the 2020 Thuringian government crisis, which ultimately led to Kemmerich's resignation. (Note: 46 seats needed for a majority (AfD 22, CDU 21, FDP 5). Total 48 seats, of which 45 voted for Kemmerich in the plurality vote.) A hypothetical coalition involving CDU/CSU and AfD would have a majority in several Landtag elections. It is referred to as a "black–blue coalition" or "midnight coalition".

State parliament	Election year	Majority required	CDU/CSU seats	AfD seats	Black–blue total
Saxony	2014	64	59	14	73
Saxony-Anhalt	2016	44	30	25	55
Saarland	2017	26	24	3	27
Bavaria	2018	103	85	22	107
Saxony	2019	60	45	38	83
Saxony-Anhalt	2021	49	40	23	63
Bavaria	2023	102	85	32	117
Hesse	2023	67	52	28	80
Saxony	2024	61	41	40	81
Thuringia	2024	45	23	32	55
Rhineland-Palatinate	2026	53	39	24	63
Baden-Württemberg	2026	79	56	35	91
Saxony-Anhalt	2026	42	15	39	54

Such a coalition would have had a majority in the 21st Bundestag elected in 2025, the two parties having a total of 360 out of 630 seats; (Note: 316 seats needed for a majority. CDU/CSU 208, AfD 152.) before and after the 2025 German federal election, held on 23 February, the CDU and CSU rejected this due to the cordon sanitaire. Other coalitions involving the AfD are considered even more unlikely due to ideological differences.

== See also ==
- Great Coalition (Weimar Republic), comprising the main pro-democratic parties at the time: the Social Democratic Party (SPD), the German Centre Party (DZP), the German Democratic Party (DDP), and the German People's Party (DVP)
- List of current heads of government of the German federal states, with information on which parties are included in each state government
