= Heiner Garg =

German politician of Free Democratic Party

Heinrich Garg
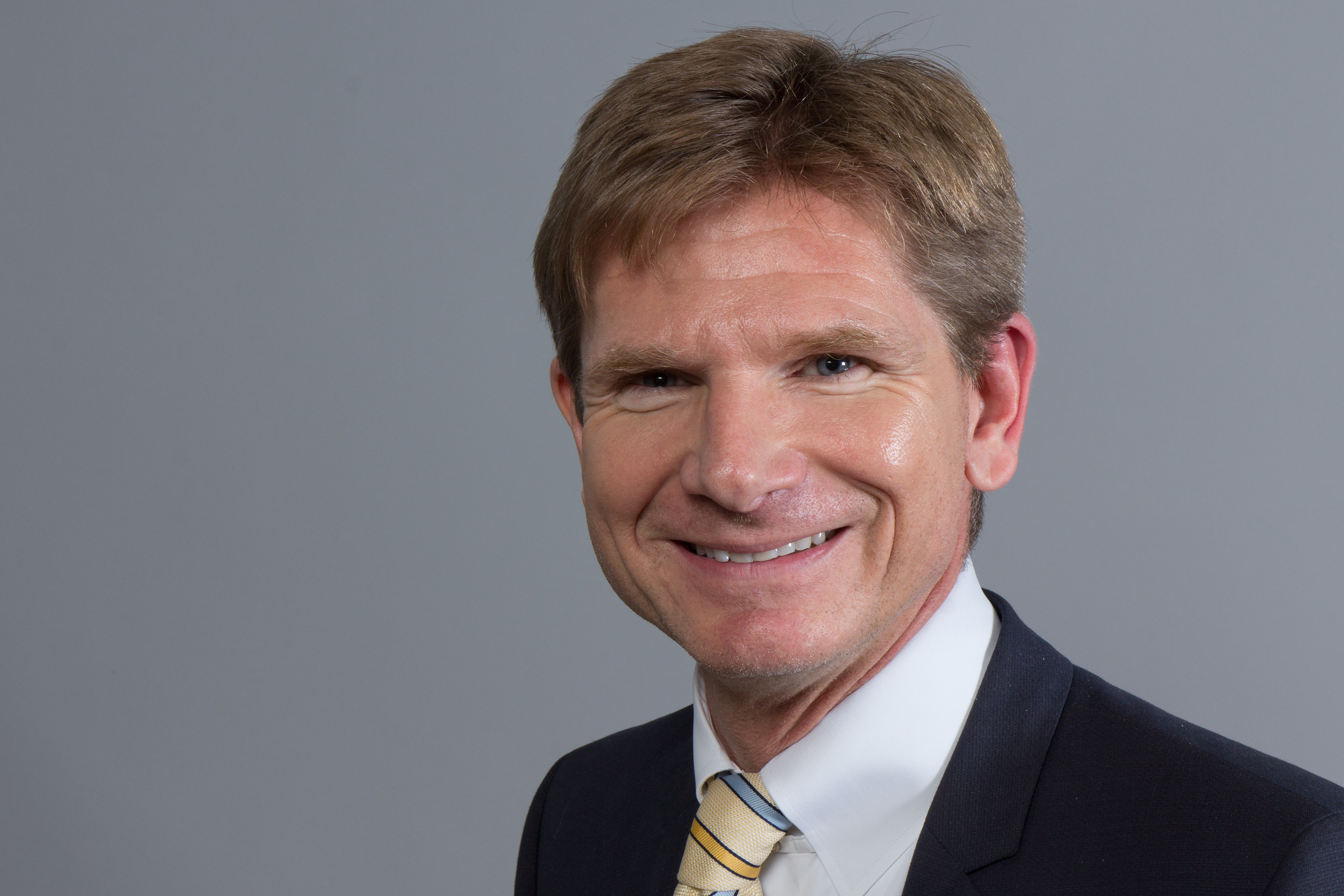

Member of the Landtag of Schleswig-Holstein
- Incumbent
- Assumed office 7 June 2022

Deputy Minister-President of Schleswig-Holstein
- In office 28 June 2017 – 29 June 2022 Serving with Monika Heinold
- Preceded by: Anke Spoorendonk

Schleswig-Holstein Minister of Health, Labour and Social Affairs
- In office 28 June 2017 – 29 June 2022
- Appointed by: Daniel Günther
- Preceded by: Christian von Boetticher
- Succeeded by: Aminata Touré

Schleswig-Holstein Minister of Health, Labour and Social Affairs
- In office 27 September 2009 – 12 June 2012
- Appointed by: Peter Harry Carstensen
- Preceded by: Kristin Alheit
- Succeeded by: Gitta Trauernicht

Member of the Schleswig-Holstein Landtag
- In office 28 March 2000 – 28 June 2017

Personal details
- Born: 9 February 1966 (age 60) Freiburg im Breisgau, West Germany
- Party: Free Democratic Party of Germany

Heinrich "Heiner" Garg (born 9 February 1966 in Freiburg im Breisgau) is a German politician of the Free Democratic Party (FDP).

== Early life and career ==
Garg studied economics at the University of Freiburg.

== Political career ==
Garg first joined the FDP in 1990. In the 2000 state elections, he became a member of Landtag of Schleswig-Holstein. From 2003 until 2009, he served on the Committee on Social Affairs. From 2011 Garg was the leader of party FDP in Schleswig-Holstein, succeeding Jürgen Koppelin.

From 2009 to 2012 Garg served as Schleswig-Holstein's State Minister of Health, Labour and Social Affairs in the government of Minister-President Peter Harry Carstensen of Schleswig-Holstein. After leaving government, he was a member of the State Parliament's Finance Committee from 2012 until 2017.

From 2017 Garg served again as Schleswig-Holstein's State Minister of Health Care, Labour and Social Affairs, this time in a coalition government led by Minister-President Daniel Günther until 2022. As one of the state's representatives at the Bundesrat, he was a member of the Committee on Health, the Committee on Labour, Integration and Social Policy, and the Committee on Women and Youth. He is also a member of the German-French Friendship Group set up by the Bundesrat and the French Senate.

In the negotiations to form a so-called traffic light coalition of the Social Democratic Party (SPD), the Green Party and the FDP following the 2021 federal elections, Garg was part of his party's delegation in the working group on health, co-chaired by Katja Pähle, Maria Klein-Schmeink and Christine Aschenberg-Dugnus.

Garg was elected a Member of the Landtag of Schleswig-Holstein in the 2022 Schleswig-Holstein state election.

== Other activities ==
- Stiftung Lesen, Member of the Board of Trustees

== Personal life ==
Garg lives with his partner in Kiel. In 2020, they got married.
