= Niclas Herbst =

German politician of the Christian Democratic Union (born 1973)

Niclas Herbst MEP
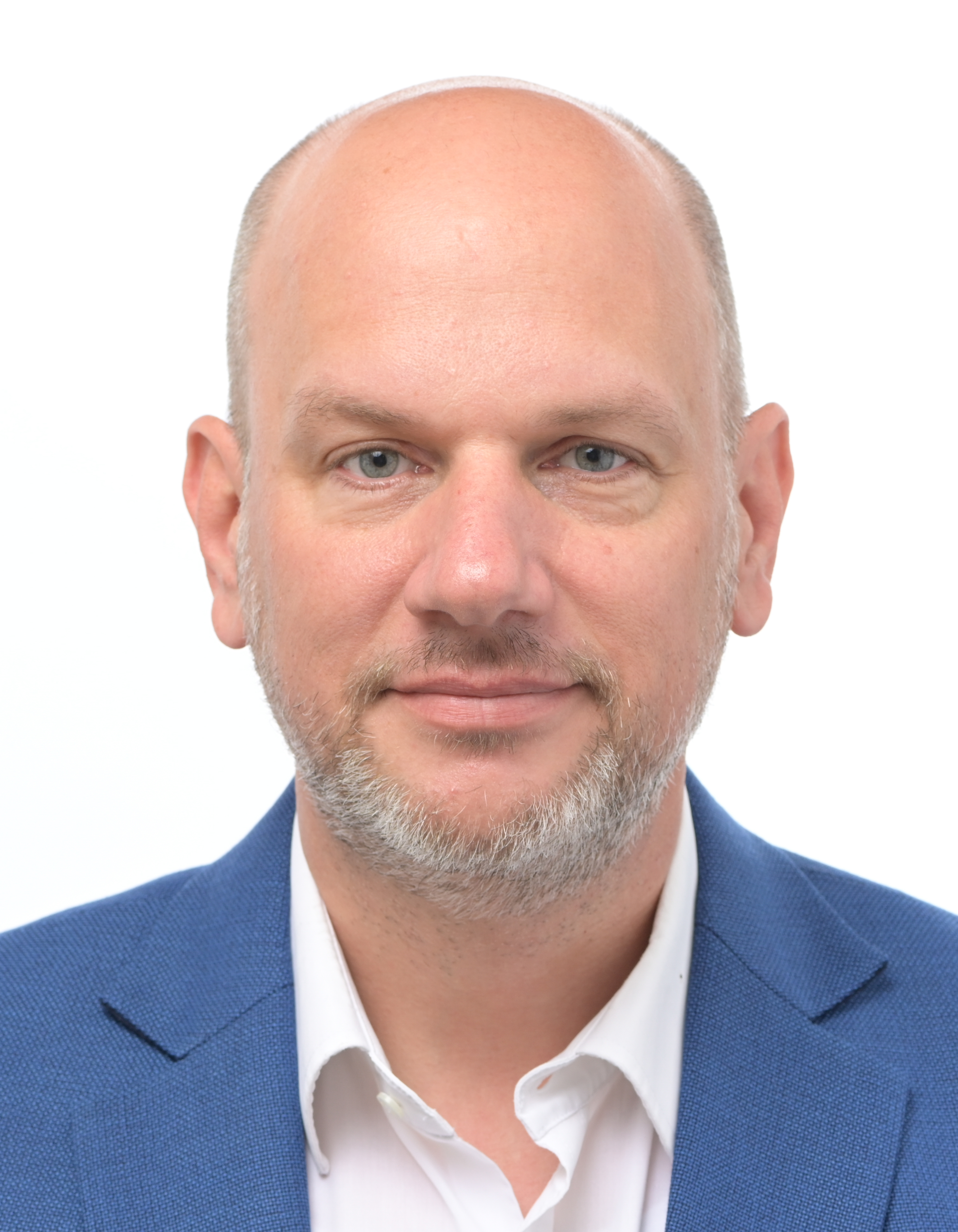

Member of the European Parliament for Germany

Personal details
- Born: 28 February 1973 (age 53) Ratzeburg, West Germany
- Party: German: Christian Democratic Union; EU: European People's Party
- Education: University of Kiel

Niclas Herbst (born 28 February 1973) is a German politician of the Christian Democratic Union (CDU) who has been serving as a Member of the European Parliament since 2019.

== Political career ==
=== Career in state politics ===
Herbst joined the CDU in 1990. Since 2000, he has been a member of the party's leadership in Schleswig-Holstein.

From 2005 to 2012, Herbst served as a member of the Landtag of Schleswig-Holstein, where he was, among other things, deputy chair of the Committee on European Affairs. In addition to his committee assignments, he was a member of the European Committee of the Regions from 2010 to 2012.

From 2017 until 2019, Herbst served as advisor to Minister-President Daniel Günther.

=== Member of the European Parliament, 2019–present ===
Herbst has been a Member of the European Parliament since the 2019 European elections. He has since been serving on the Committee on Budgets and the Committee on Fisheries.

In addition to his committee assignments, Herbst is part of the Parliament's delegation to the ACP–EU Joint Parliamentary Assembly, the European Parliament Intergroup on Seas, Rivers, Islands and Coastal Areas and the European Parliament Intergroup on Traditional Minorities, National Communities and Languages.

== Other activities ==
- Hamburger SV, Member
- Reservist Association of Deutsche Bundeswehr, Member

== Recognition ==
In December 2020, Herbst received the Agriculture, Rural Development and Fisheries award at The Parliament Magazine's annual MEP Awards.
