= Antje Jansen =

German politician

Antje Jansen (born 1 March 1950) is a former German politician, and member of the Landtag of Schleswig-Holstein from 2009 to 2012.

== Early life ==
Jansen was born in Kiel.

== Political career ==
She was a member of the Greens from 1990 to 2001.

Jansen was an unsuccessful Party of Democratic Socialism candidate in the 2002 German federal election.

She was elected in the 2009 Schleswig-Holstein state election.

She led The Left into the 2012 Schleswig-Holstein state election, in which the party experienced electoral wipeout.
