= Jost de Jager =

German politician

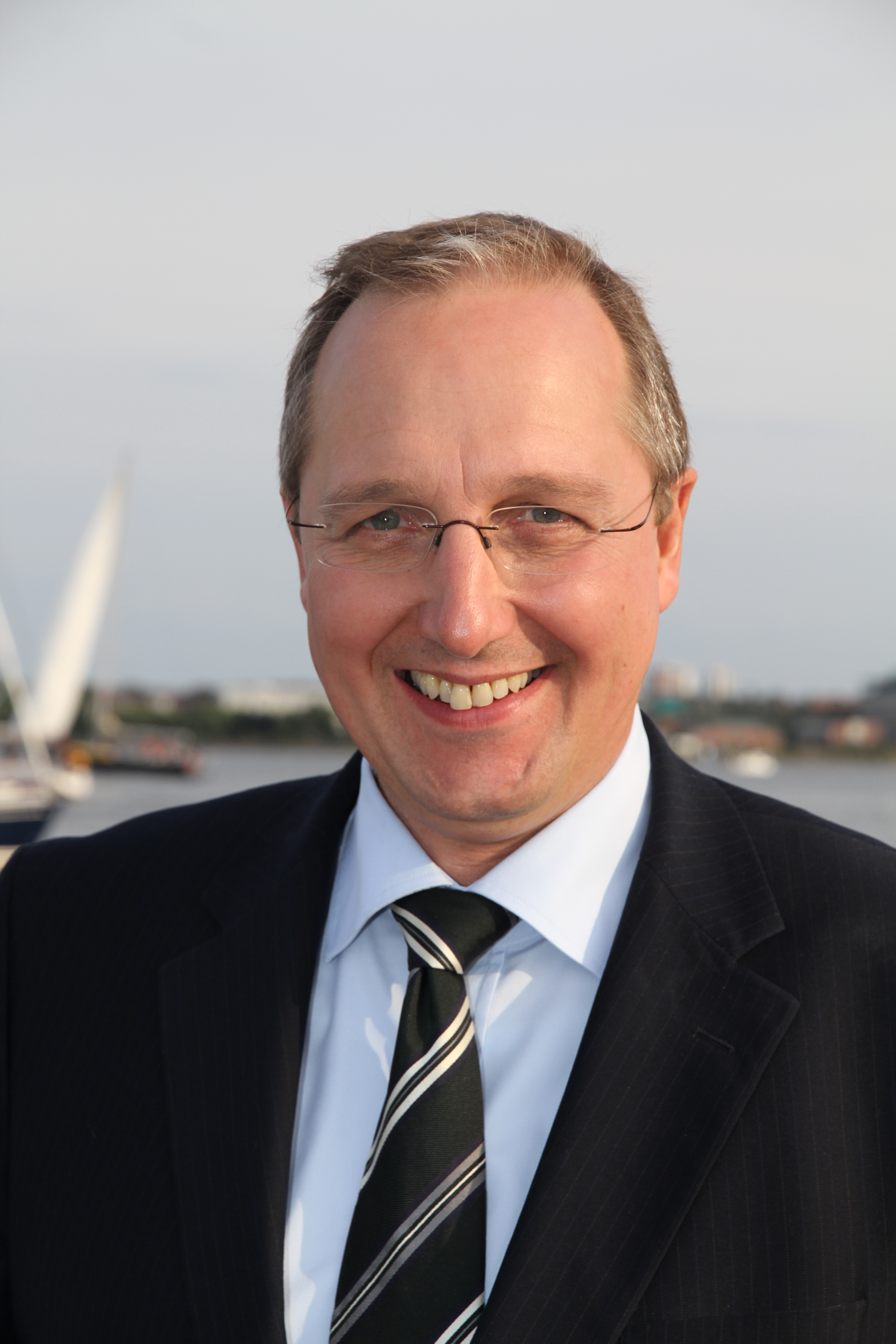
- De Jager in 2011

Schleswig-Holstein Minister of Science, Economic Affairs and Transport
- In office October 27, 2009 – June 12, 2012
- Appointed by: Peter Harry Carstensen
- Succeeded by: Reinhard Meyer (Economic Affairs and Transport) Waltraud Wende (Science)

State Secretary to the Schleswig-Holstein Ministry of Science, Economic Affairs and Transport
- In office April 2005 – October 2009
- Appointed by: Peter Harry Carstensen

Member of the Schleswig-Holstein Landtag
- In office 1996–2005

Personal details
- Born: March 7, 1965 (age 61) Rendsburg, West Germany
- Party: CDU Christian Democratic Union of Germany (CDU)
- Education: University of Kiel
- Profession: Journalist
- Website: https://www.jostdejager.de/

Jost de Jager (born March 7, 1965) is a German business consultant, politician and former Schleswig-Holstein Minister of Science, Economic Affairs and Transport.

== Personal life and education ==
De Jager lives with his family in Eckernförde.

Between 1987 and 1994, he studied history, English studies and Politics at the University of Kiel.

== Career ==
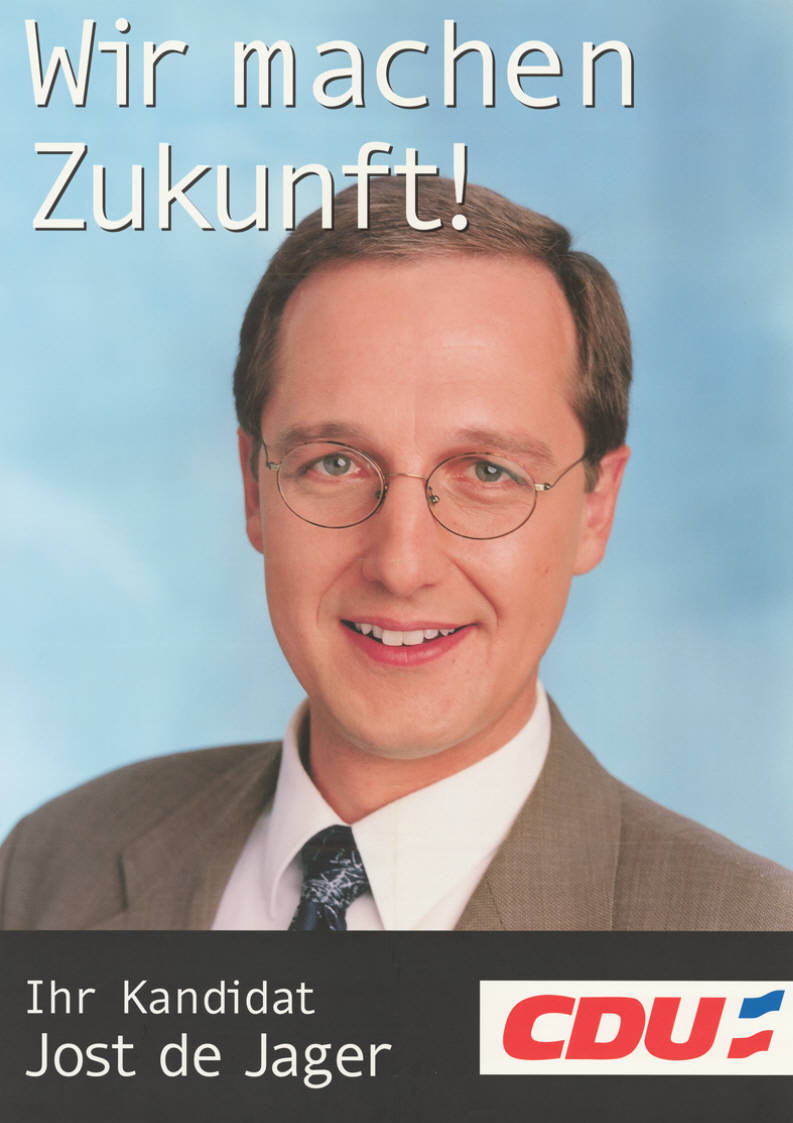
Election poster from 2000 showing De Jager

De Jager worked as a volunteer at the evangelical press service in Kiel between 1994 and 1996.

He was a member of the Schleswig-Holstein Landtag for the Christian Democratic Union (CDU) between 1996 and 2005 and became his factions spokesman on European politics in 1996. From 1998 to 2002, he was his factions spokesman on education.

In 2005, De Jager was appointed State Secretary to the Schleswig-Holstein Ministry of Science, Economic Affairs and Transport until he was appointed Minister of Science, Economic Affairs and Transport by Peter Harry Carstensen on October 27, 2009. De Jager was made his party's lead candidate for the 2012 Schleswig-Holstein State Elections in which his party lost to the Social Democrats. He was subsequently succeeded as Minister by Reinhard Meyer (Economic Affairs and Transport) and Waltraud Wende (Science).
