= 2012 Schleswig-Holstein state election =

German state election

← 2009	6 May 2012	2017 →

All 69 seats in the Landtag of Schleswig-Holstein 35 seats needed for a majority
- Turnout: 1,328,452 (60.2%) ▼13.4%
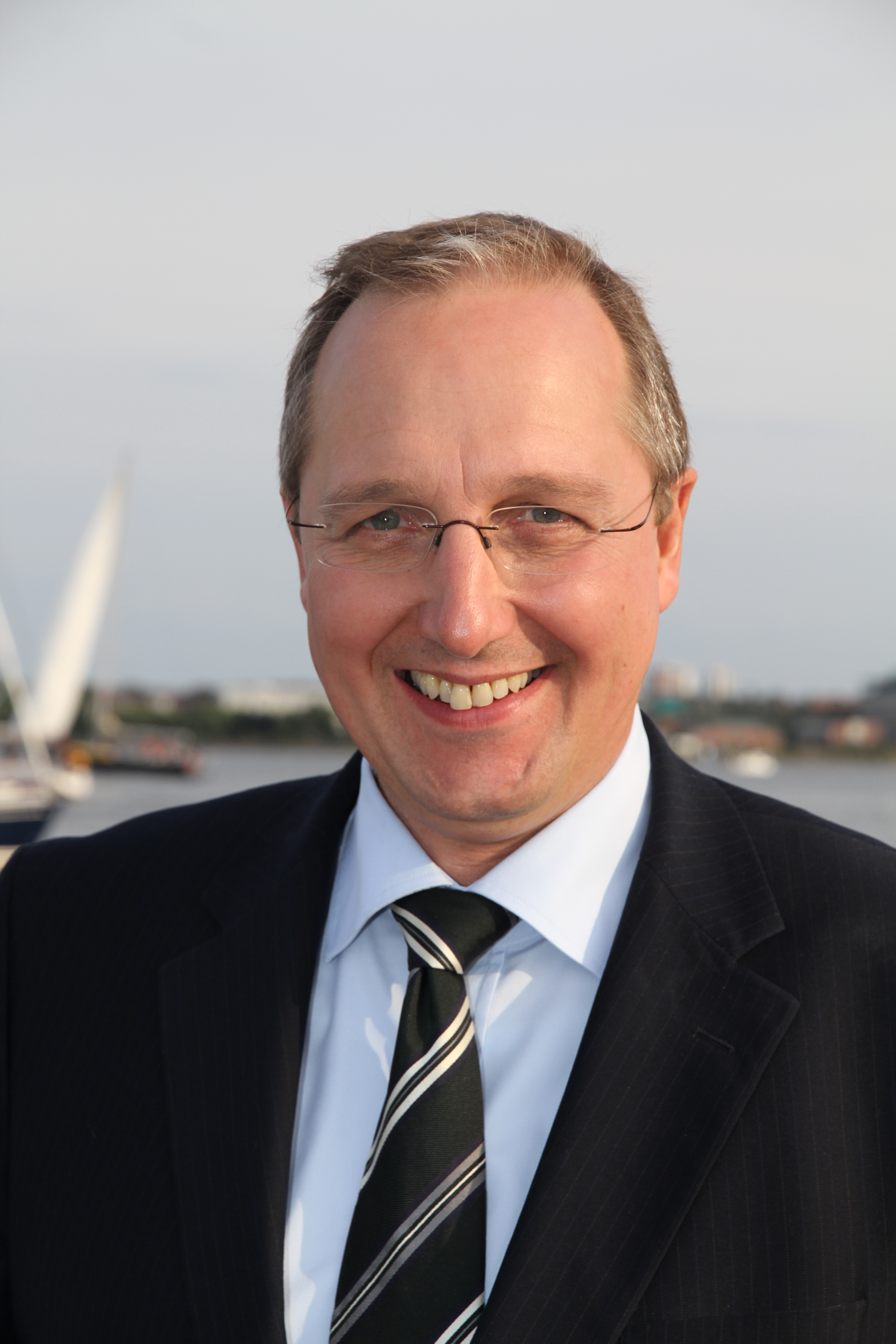

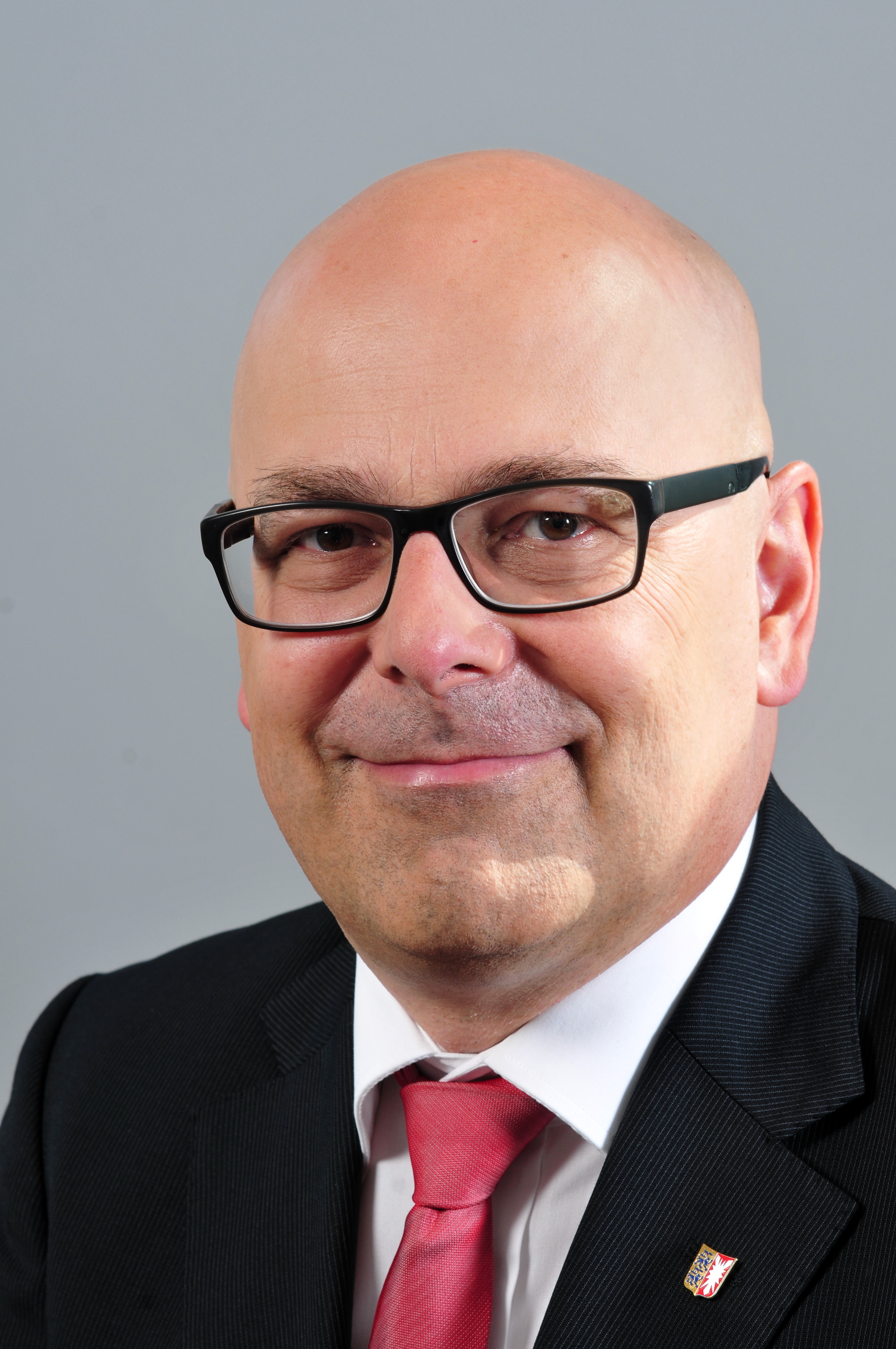

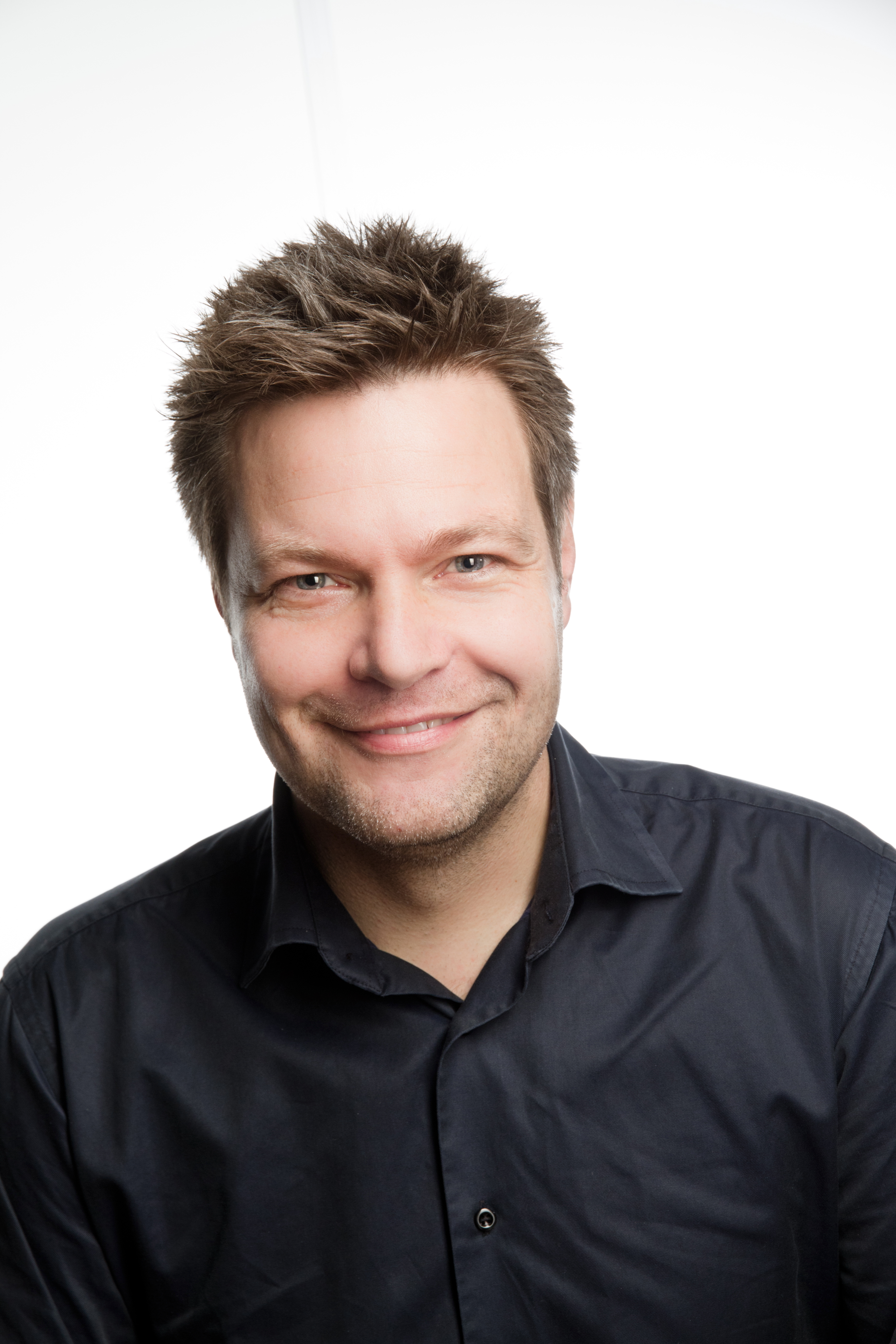

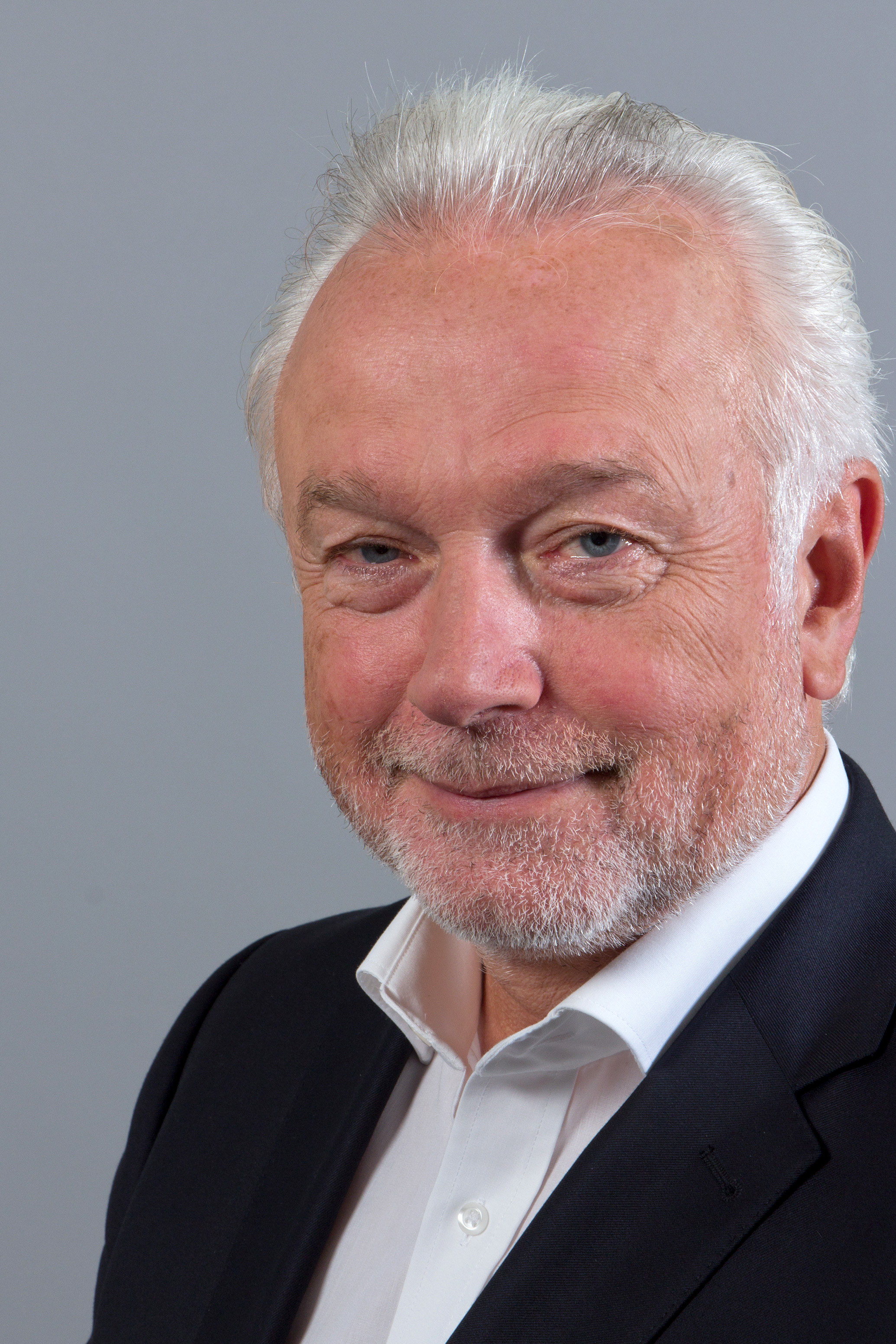

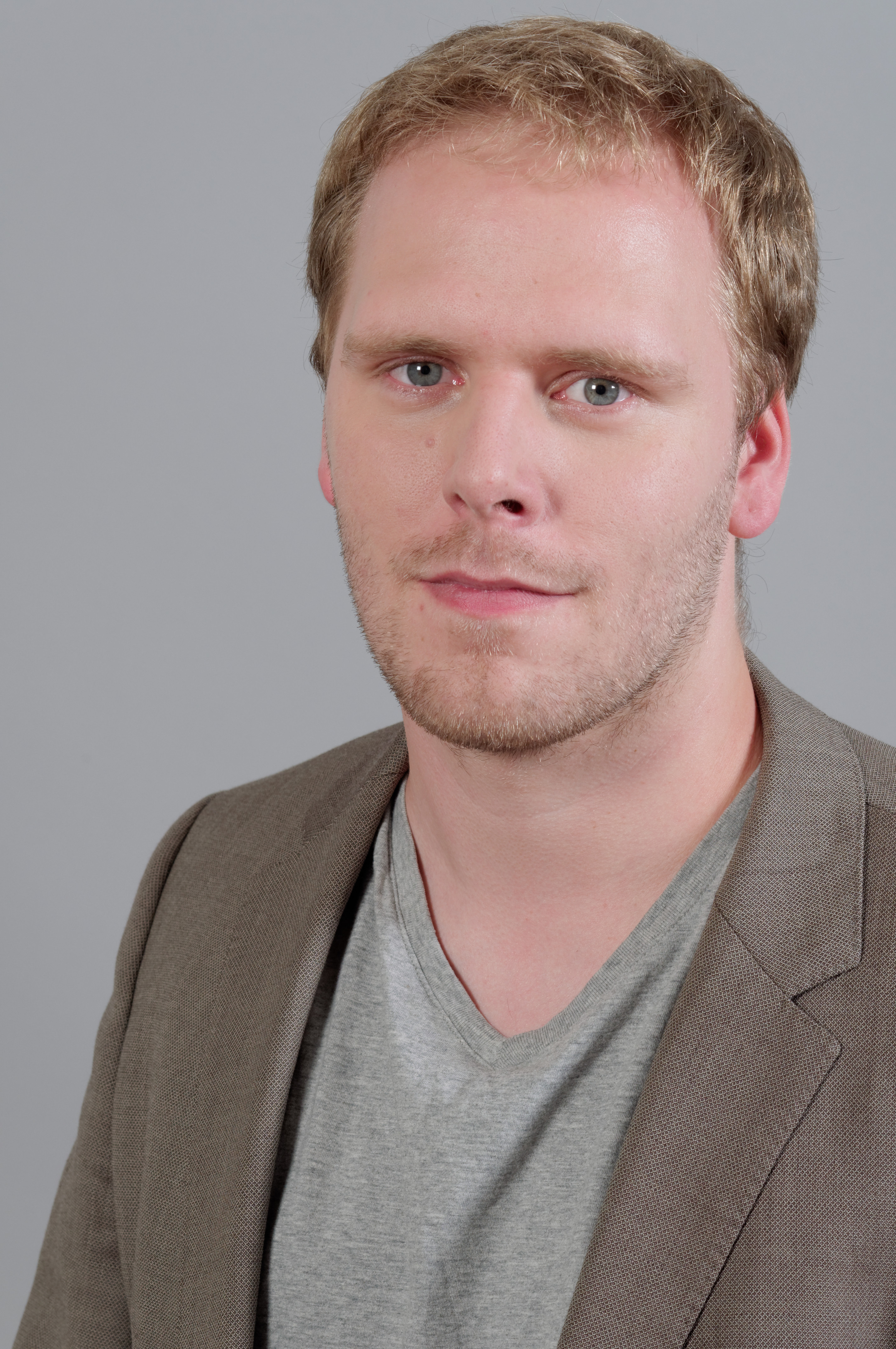

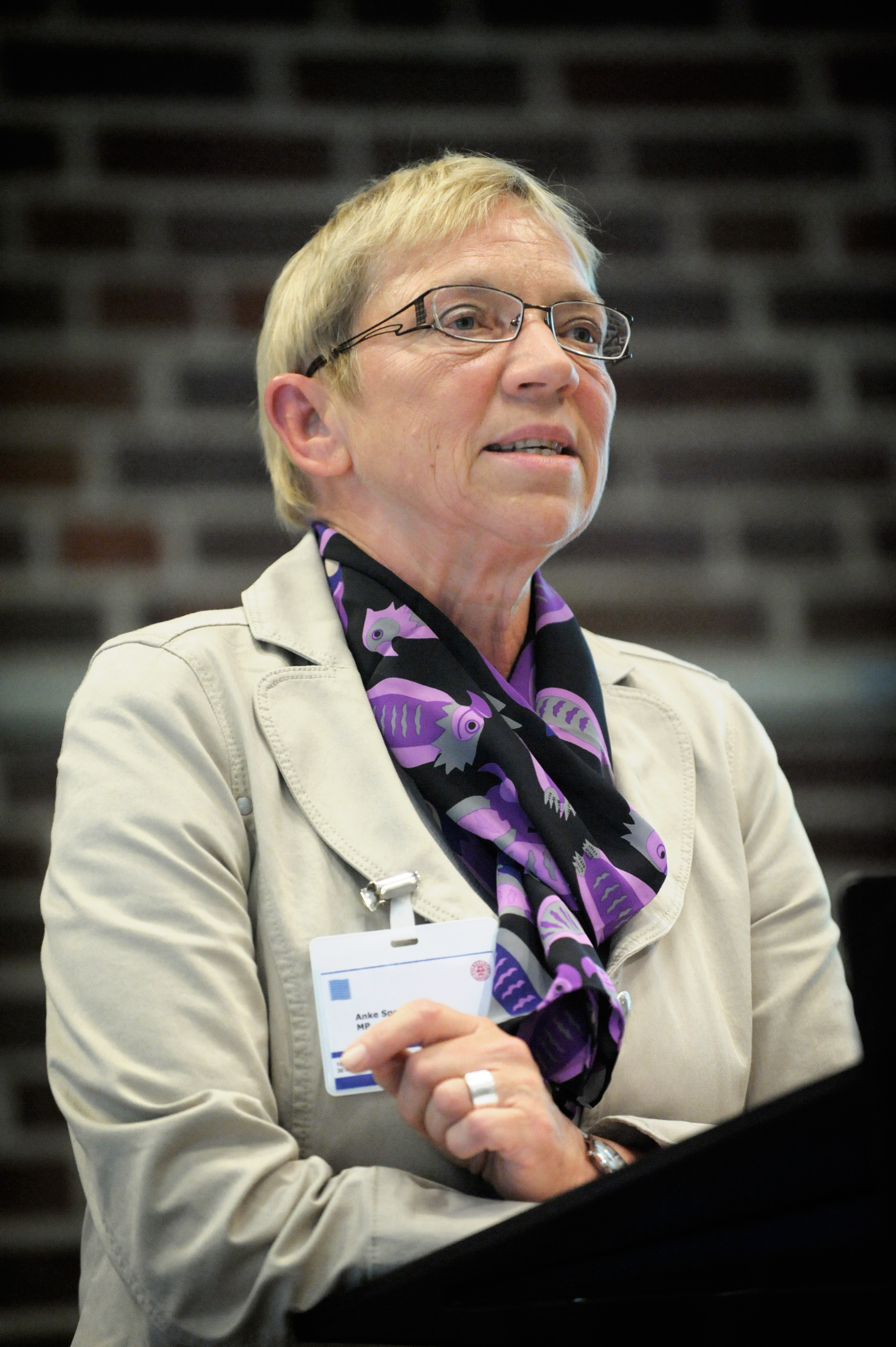
	First party	Second party	Third party
Leader	Jost de Jager	Torsten Albig	Robert Habeck
Party	CDU	SPD	Greens
Last election	34 seats, 31.5%	25 seats, 25.4%	12 seats, 12.4%
Seats won	22	22	10
Seat change	▼12	▼3	▼2
Popular vote	408,637	404,048	174,953
Percentage	30.8%	30.4%	13.2%
Swing	▼0.7%	▲5.0%	▲0.8%
	Fourth party	Fifth party	Sixth party
Leader	Wolfgang Kubicki	Torge Schmidt	Anke Spoorendonk
Party	FDP	Pirates	SSW
Last election	14 seats, 14.9%	0 seats, 1.8%	4 seats, 4.3%
Seats won	6	6	3
Seat change	▼8	▲6	▼1
Popular vote	108,953	108,902	61,025
Percentage	8.2%	8.2%	4.6%
Swing	▼6.7%	▲6.4%	▲0.3%
- Results for the single-member constituencies
Minister-President before election
Peter Harry Carstensen
CDU
Elected Minister-President
Torsten Albig
SPD

Results for the direct mandates

The 2012 Schleswig-Holstein state election was held on 6 May 2012 to elect the members of the Landtag of Schleswig-Holstein. The incumbent coalition government of the Christian Democratic Union and Free Democratic Party (FDP) was defeated. Though the CDU remained the largest party, the Social Democratic Party (SPD) negotiated a coalition with The Greens and the South Schleswig Voters' Association (SSW). This was dubbed the "Danish traffic light" or "Namibia coalition". SPD leader Torsten Albig was subsequently elected Minister-President by the Landtag.

== Background ==
After the 2009 state election, the CDU formed a coalition with the FDP under Minister-President Peter Harry Carstensen. Due to ambiguity and complications with the electoral law, the election result was the subject of a legal challenge by the Greens, SSW, and The Left. In August 2010, the state Constitutional Court ruled that the electoral law was unconstitutional. The court mandated that a new electoral law be legislated within six months and that new elections be held by September 2012, two years ahead of schedule.

Minister-President Carstensen had stated his intention to retire at the next election. The CDU therefore needed to pick a candidate to succeed him as Minister-President if they won the election. At a party conference in May 2011, they chose Christian von Boetticher, incumbent deputy Minister-President and leader of the CDU parliamentary group. In August, however, von Boetticher resigned these positions after it was revealed that he had been involved in an intimate relationship with a 16-year-old girl as recently as 2010. Two days later, the CDU announced that Minister of Science, Economic Affairs and Transport Jost de Jager had been nominated as their new candidate for Minister-President.

== Parties ==
The table below lists parties represented in the previous Landtag of Schleswig-Holstein.

Name		Ideology	Leader(s)	2009 result	
Name		Ideology	Leader(s)	Votes (%)	Seats
CDU	Christian Democratic Union of Germany; Christlich Demokratische Union Deutschlands	Christian democracy	Jost de Jager	31.5%	34 / 95
SPD	Social Democratic Party of Germany; Sozialdemokratische Partei Deutschlands	Social democracy	Torsten Albig	25.4%	25 / 95
FDP	Free Democratic Party; Freie Demokratische Partei	Classical liberalism	Wolfgang Kubicki	14.9%	14 / 95
Grüne	Alliance 90/The Greens; Bündnis 90/Die Grünen	Green politics	Robert Habeck	12.4%	12 / 95
Linke	The Left; Die Linke	Democratic socialism	Antje Jansen	6.0%	6 / 95
SSW	South Schleswig Voters' Association; Südschleswigscher Wählerverband	Danish and Frisian minority interests	Anke Spoorendonk	4.3%	4 / 95

== Opinion polling ==
=== Party polling ===
Polling firm	Fieldwork date	Sample size	CDU	SPD	FDP	Grüne	Linke	SSW	Piraten	Others	Lead
2012 state election	6 May 2012	–	30.8	30.4	8.2	13.2	2.3	4.6	8.2	2.4	0.4
GMS	28 Apr–1 May 2012	1,002	32	33	6	12	2	4	8	3	1
Infratest dimap	24–26 Apr 2012	1,001	30	32	6	13	2.5	4.5	9	3	2
Forschungsgruppe Wahlen	23–26 Apr 2012	1,003	31	31	7	12.5	2.5	4	9	3	Tie
Infratest dimap	12–17 Apr 2012	1,000	31	32	5	13	2	4	10	3	1
Infratest dimap	10–11 Apr 2012	1,000	32	32	4	12	3	4	11	2	Tie
Infratest dimap	22–27 Mar 2012	1,000	34	32	4	15	4	4	5	2	2
dimap	9–13 Mar 2012	1,003	34	33	4	15	3	4	5	?	1
Forsa	March 2012	?	35	35	2	13	3	4	5	?	Tie
Infratest dimap	13–16 Feb 2012	1,000	33	33	3	16	3	3	5	4	Tie
Emnid	17–19 Jan 2012	1,000	34	32	4	15	3	3	7	2	2
Forsa	15–17 Nov 2011	1,002	33	32	3	17	3	3	6	3	1
Infratest dimap	26–27 Sep 2011	1,000	30	34	3	21	2	3	4	3	4
Forsa	15 Aug 2011	752	30	32	4	19	4	4	–	7	2
Infratest dimap	13–16 May 2011	1,000	33	31	4	22	2	4	1	3	2
Forsa	31 Aug–1 Sep 2010	751	31	31	7	18	5	5	–	3	Tie
Infratest dimap	30–31 Aug 2010	1,001	32	32	5	19	4	4	–	4	Tie
IfM Leipzig	29–31 Mar 2010	823	31	22	12	20	6	4	–	5	9
2009 state election	27 September 2009	–	31.5	25.4	14.9	12.4	6.0	4.3	1.8	3.6	6.1

=== Minister-President polling ===
Polling firm	Fieldwork date			Lead
Polling firm	Fieldwork date	Jost de Jager CDU	Torsten Albig SPD	Lead
Forschungsgruppe Wahlen	27 Apr 2012	29	44	15
Infratest dimap	26 Apr 2012	27	49	22
Infratest dimap	19 Apr 2012	32	56	24
Infratest dimap	12 Apr 2012	31	53	22
Infratest dimap	29 Mar 2012	33	49	26
Infratest dimap	17 Feb 2012	29	45	16
Infratest dimap	28 Sep 2011	27	45	18
Forsa	17 Aug 2011	30	34	4

== Election result ==
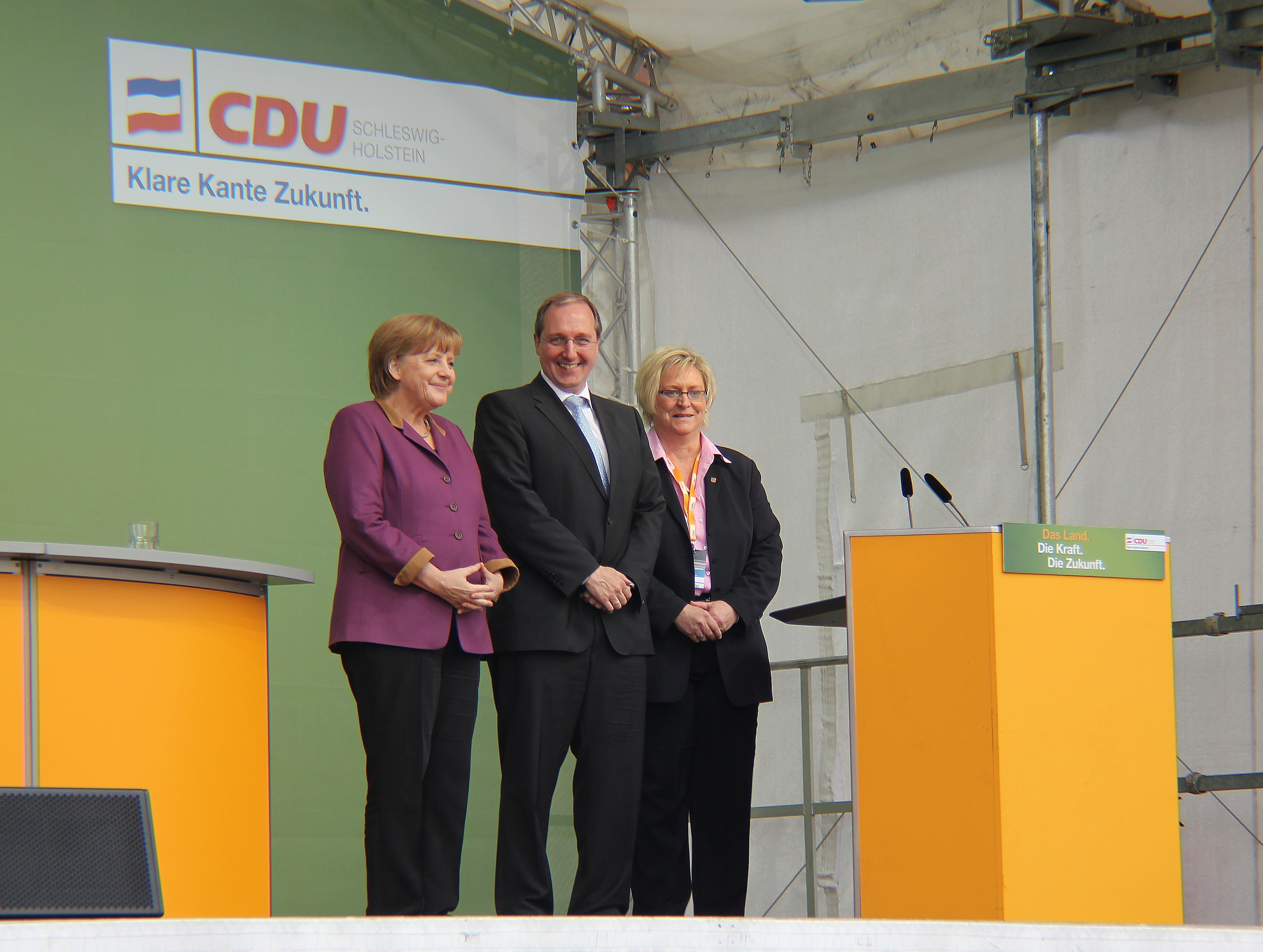
From left to right: Angela Merkel, Jost de Jager, and Susanne Herold at a campaign event in Flensburg.

The SPD recovered some of the voteshare it had lost in the 2009 election while the CDU stagnated. This led to a very close result, with both parties winning 22 seats, but the CDU leading with 30.8% of the vote to the SPD's 30.4%. On paper, the FDP was the biggest loser of the election, almost halving its voteshare from its impressive showing in 2009. However, compared to the national trend, the Schleswig-Holstein result was an unexpected success; and until April, state polling had predicted that the FDP would lose all its seats. The Greens marginally improved their performance compared to 2009. The Left fared poorly, losing all its seats after only 3 years in the Landtag. The Pirate Party won 8.2%, entering the Landtag for the first time. This came after successes in the 2011 Berlin state election and 2012 Saarland state election in the preceding months. The SSW achieved its best result since 1950 with 4.6%.

Summary of the 6 May 2012 election results for the Landtag of Schleswig-Holstein
Party	Votes	%	+/-	Seats	+/-	Seats %
Christian Democratic Union (CDU)	408,637	30.8	▼0.7	22	▼12	31.9
Social Democratic Party (SPD)	404,048	30.4	▲5.0	22	▼3	31.9
Alliance 90/The Greens (Grüne)	174,953	13.2	▲0.8	10	▼2	14.5
Free Democratic Party (FDP)	108,953	8.2	▼6.7	6	▼8	8.7
Pirate Party Germany (Piraten)	108,902	8.2	▲6.4	6	▲6	8.7
South Schleswig Voters' Association (SSW)	61,025	4.6	▲0.3	3	▼1	4.3
The Left (Linke)	29,900	2.3	▼3.7	0	▼6	0
Family Party (Familie)	12,758	1.0	▲0.2	0	±0	0
Others	19,276	1.5		0	±0	0
Total	1,328,452	100.0		69	▼26	
Voter turnout		60.2	▼13.4			

Popular Vote
CDU	30.76%
SPD	30.41%
B'90/GRÜNE	13.17%
FDP	8.20%
PIRATEN	8.20%
SSW	4.59%
DIE LINKE	2.25%
Other	2.41%

Landtag seats
CDU	31.88%
SPD	31.88%
B'90/GRÜNE	14.49%
FDP	8.70%
PIRATEN	8.70%
SSW	4.35%

== Outcome ==
The outgoing CDU–FDP government lost its majority, winning just 28 of the 35 seats needed for a majority. The SPD–Green bloc also fell short with 32 seats. CDU candidate Jost de Jager invited both the FDP and Greens to discuss a potential coalition, but neither party accepted. The SPD, Greens, and SSW began discussions for forming a government together. This was dubbed the "Danish traffic light", a play on the red-yellow-green "traffic light coalition", with the "yellow" FDP substituted for the "Danish" SSW. It would have a narrow, one-seat majority. This same arrangement had been attempted after the 2005 state election, but unexpectedly failed when one of the government members abstained. Pirate Party leader Torge Schmidt suggested that his party could lend their support to the Danish traffic light, though this never came to fruition.

Coalition talks succeeded, and the Landtag voted to confirm Torsten Albig as the new Minister-President. The government received 37 votes, meaning that at least two opposition members voted in favour.
