= Torge Schmidt =

German politician

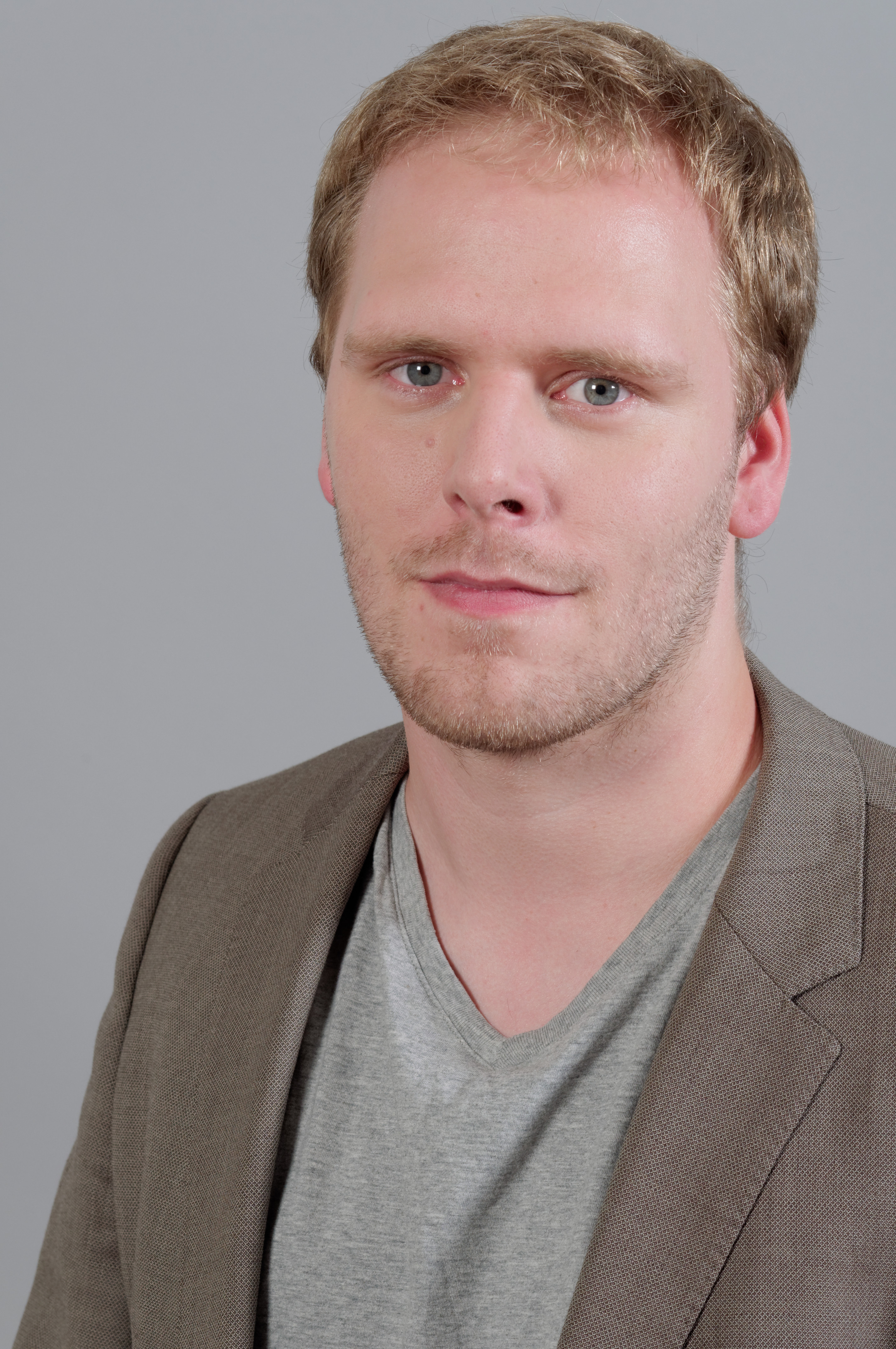
Torge Schmidt in 2013.

Hendrik Torge Schmidt (born 30 July 1988) is a former German politician. He was a member of the Landtag of Schleswig-Holstein from 2012 to 2017, and leader of the Pirate Party faction from May 2013 to April 2016.

== Early life ==
Schmidt was born in Itzehoe.

== Political career ==
On 18 June 2017, he announced his departure from the Pirate Party on his blog.
