= 2009 Schleswig-Holstein state election =

German state election

← 2005	27 September 2009	2012 →

All 95 seats in the Landtag of Schleswig-Holstein 48 seats needed for a majority
- Turnout: 1,603,406 (73.6%) ▲7.1%
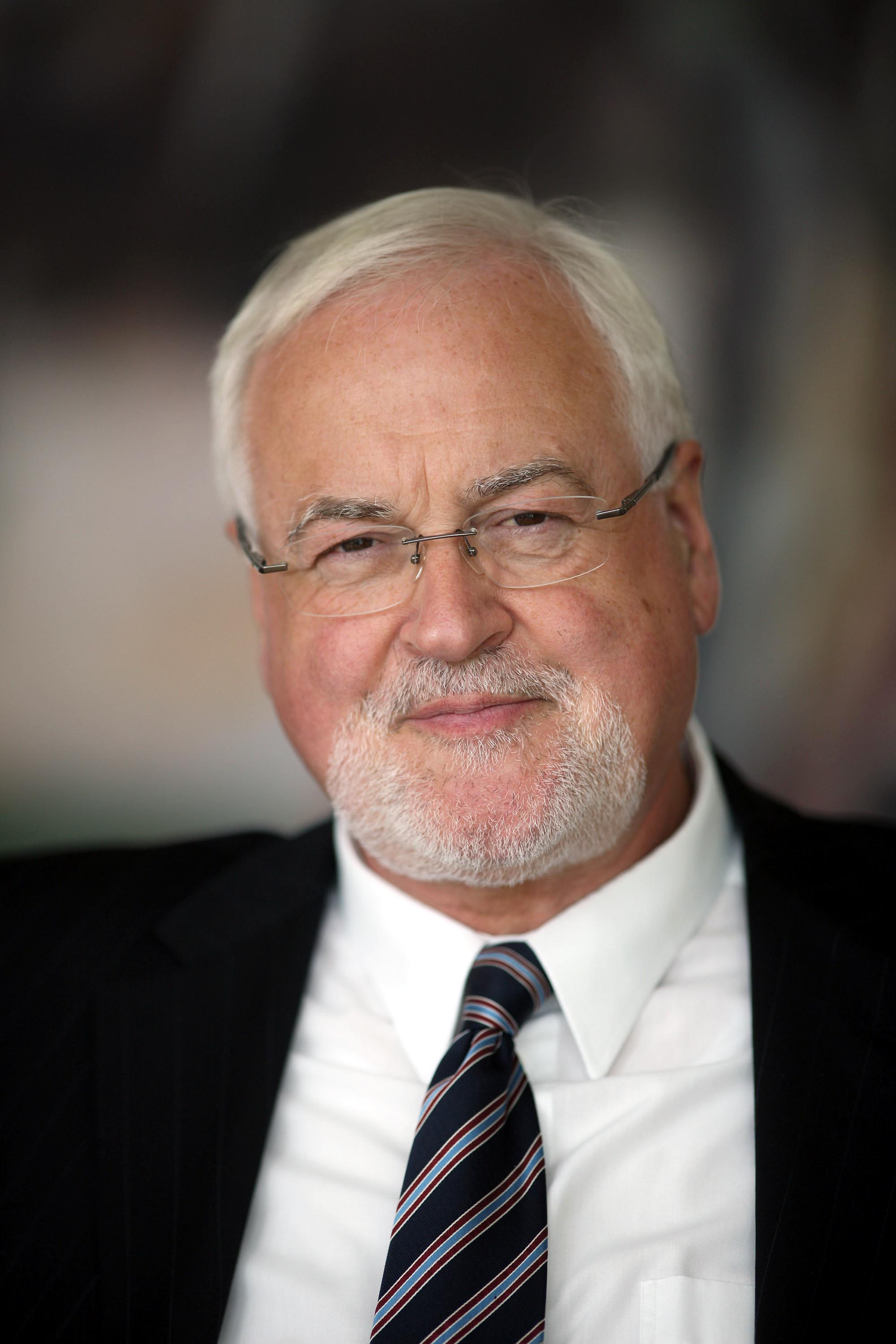

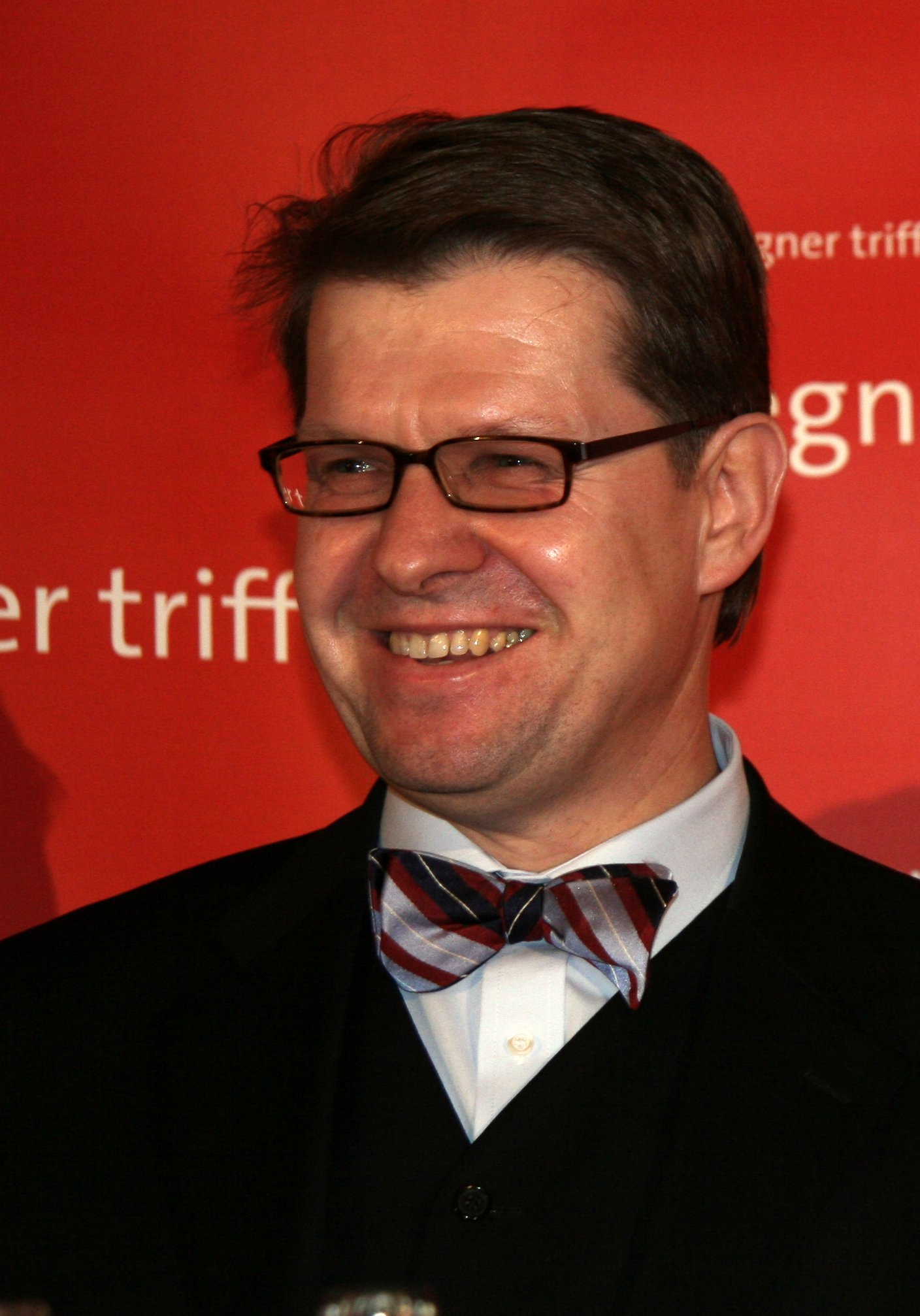

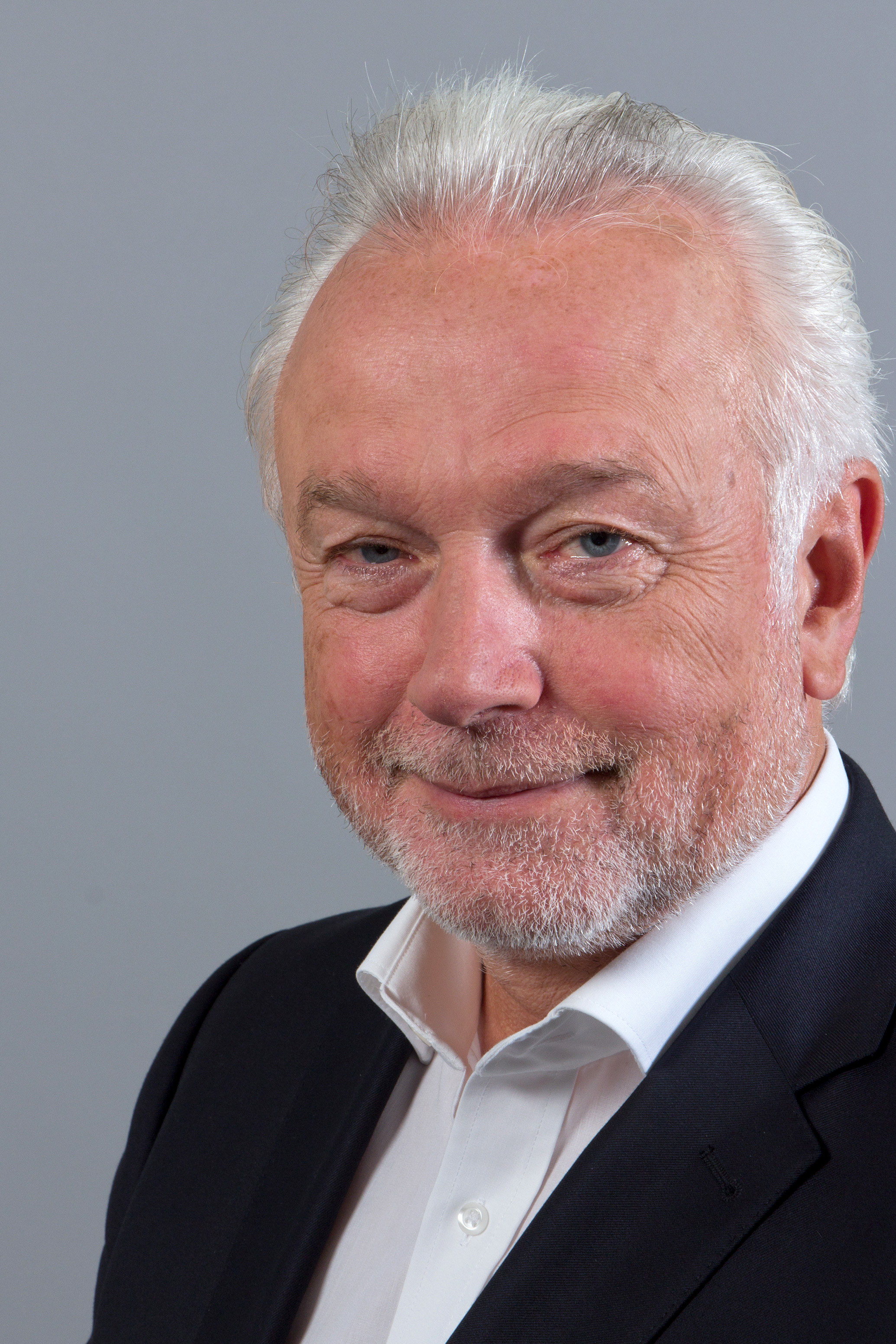

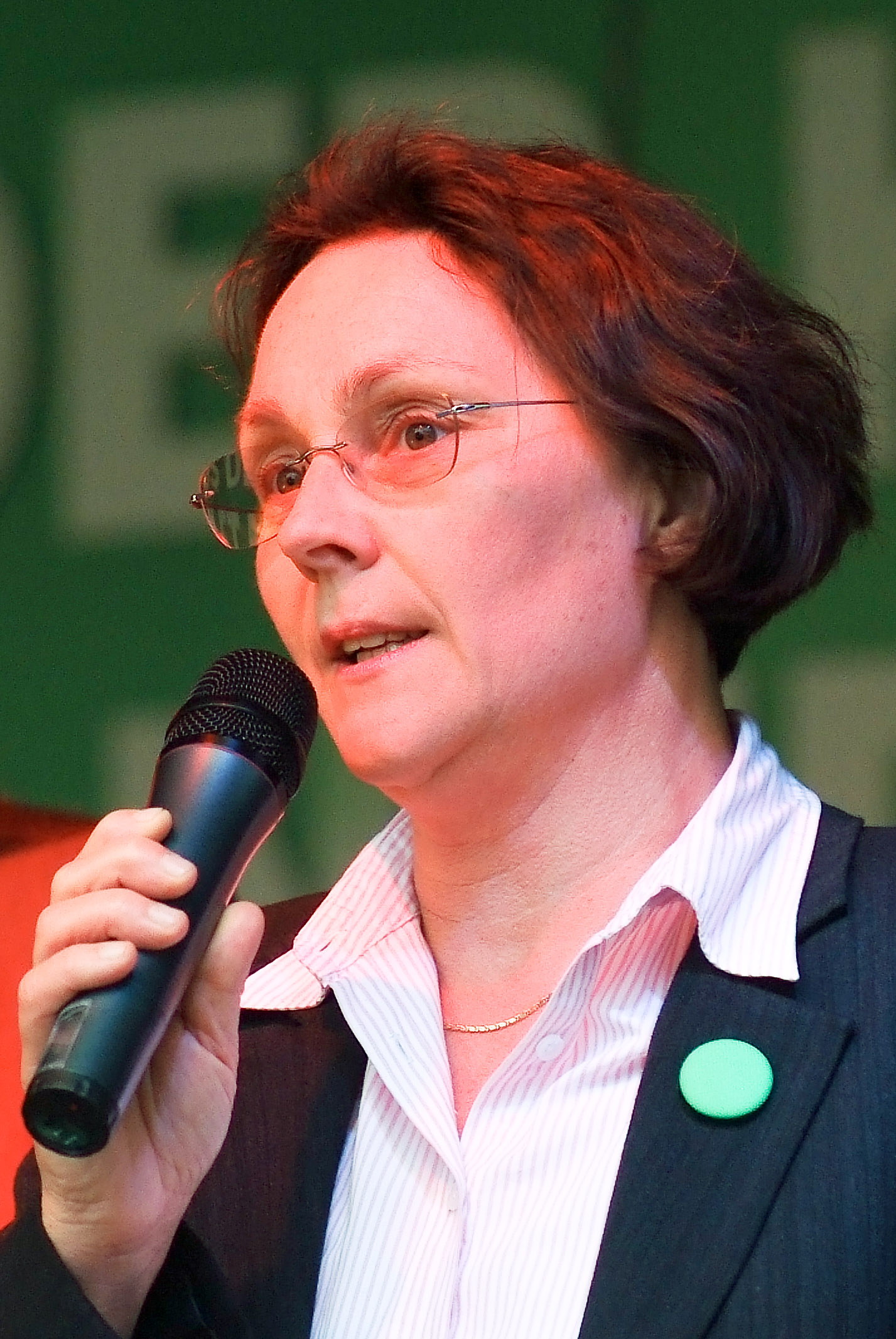

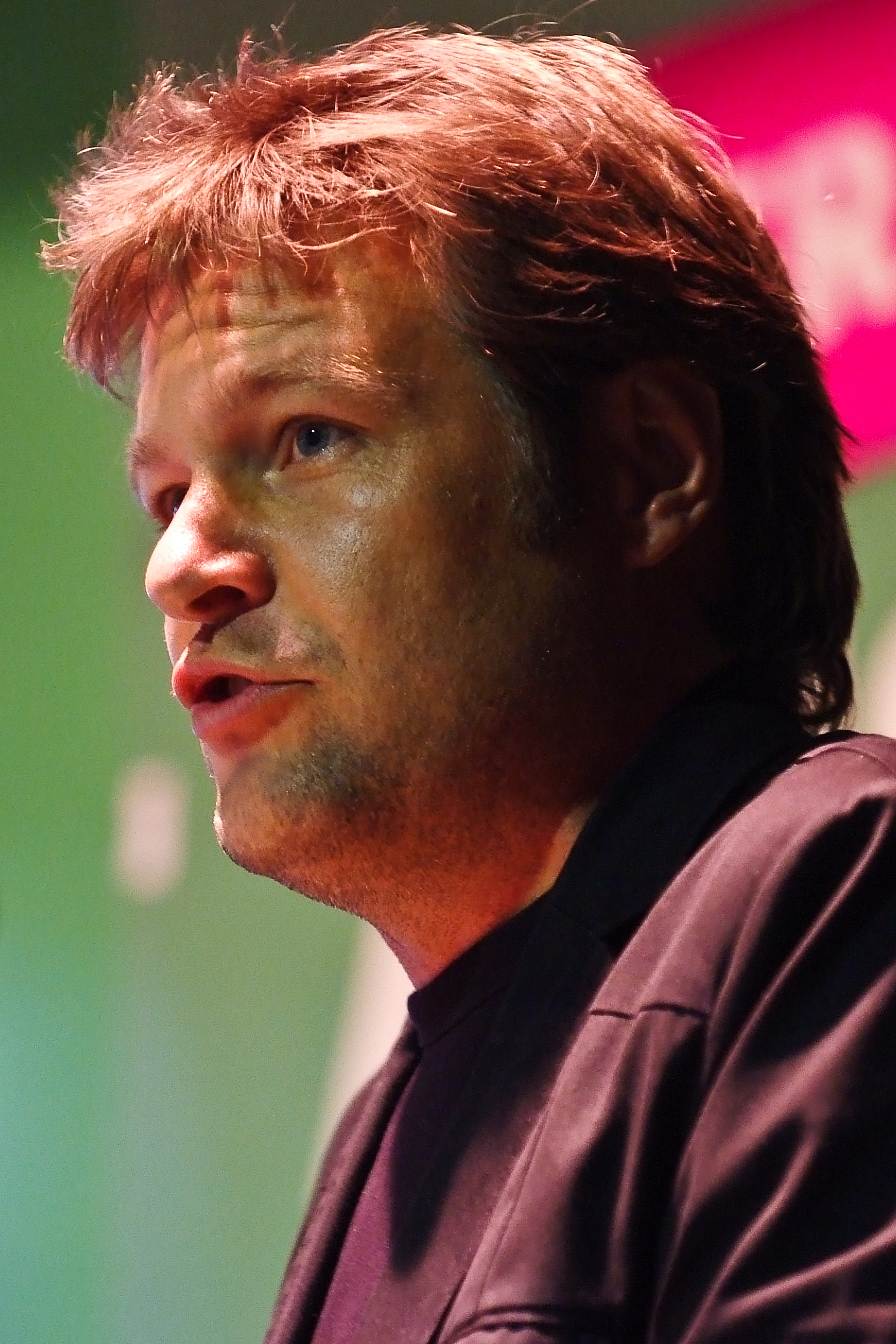

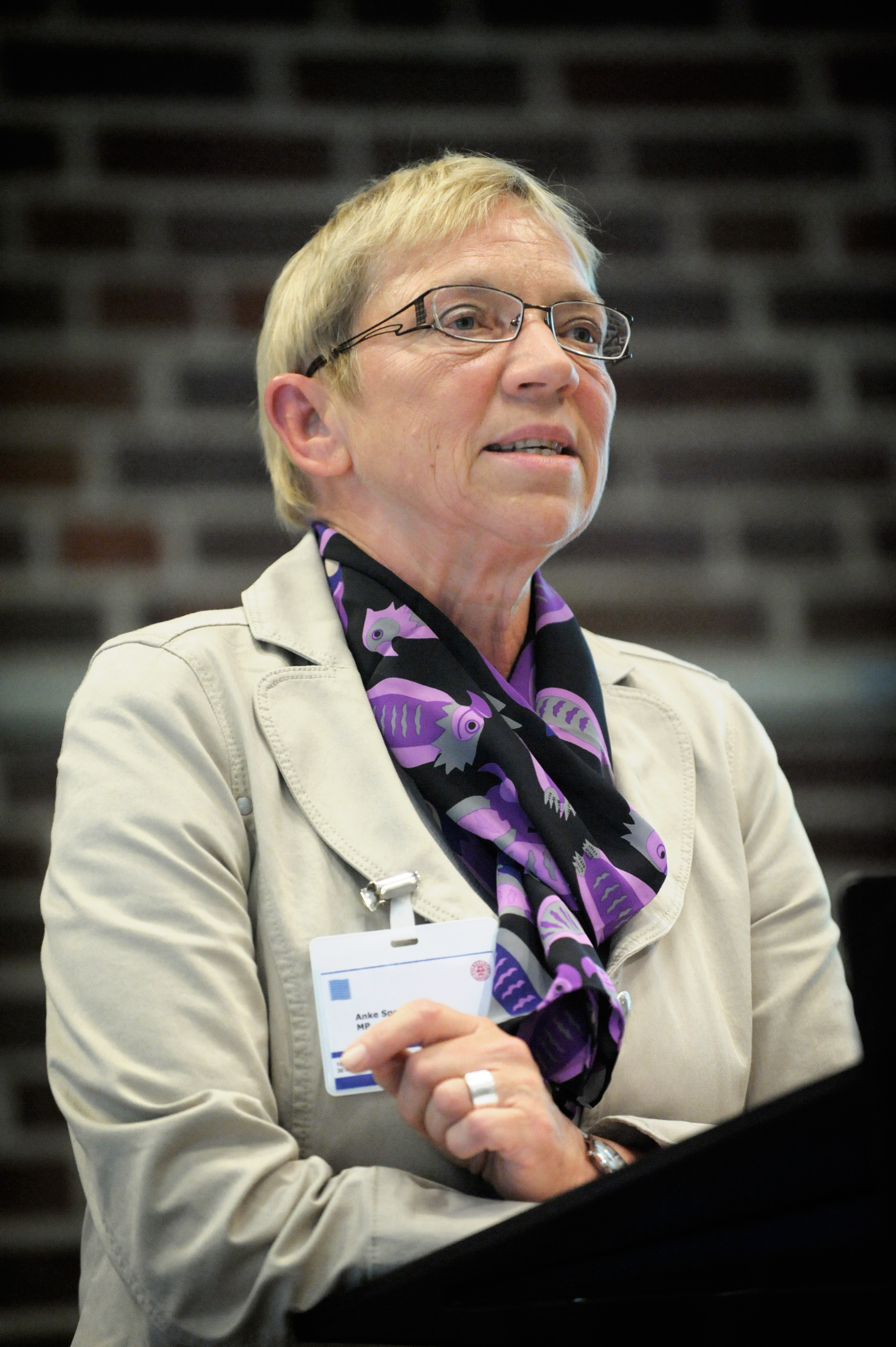
	First party	Second party	Third party
Leader	Peter Harry Carstensen	Ralf Stegner	Wolfgang Kubicki
Party	CDU	SPD	FDP
Last election	30 seats, 40.2%	29 seats, 38.7%	4 seats, 6.6%
Seats won	34	25	14
Seat change	▲4	▼4	▲10
Popular vote	505,612	407,643	239,338
Percentage	31.5%	25.4%	14.9%
Swing	▼8.7%	▼13.3%	▲8.3%
	Fourth party	Fifth party	Sixth party
Leader	Monika Heinold & Robert Habeck	Antje Jansen	Anke Spoorendonk
Party	Greens	Left	SSW
Last election	4 seats, 6.2%	0 seats, 0.8% (Note: Results for PDS.)	2 seats, 3.6%
Seats won	12	6	4
Seat change	▲8	▲6	▲2
Popular vote	199,367	95,764	69,701
Percentage	12.4%	6.0%	4.3%
Swing	▲6.2%	▲5.2%	▲0.7%
- Results for the single-member constituencies
Minister-President before election
Peter Harry Carstensen
CDU
Elected Minister-President
Peter Harry Carstensen
CDU

The 2009 Schleswig-Holstein state election was held on 27 September 2009 to elect the members of the Landtag of Schleswig-Holstein. It was held on the same day as the 2009 federal election and the 2009 Brandenburg state election.

The election was triggered by the collapse of the grand coalition between the Christian Democratic Union (CDU) and Social Democratic Party (SPD) throughout summer 2009. The election saw major losses for the parties of the grand coalition, while the Free Democratic Party (FDP), The Greens, The Left, and the South Schleswig Voters' Association (SSW) made gains.

After the election, the CDU and FDP formed a coalition government. Minister-President Peter Harry Carstensen was re-elected as Minister-President.

== Background ==
After the 2005 state election, the CDU won a narrow victory, securing 30 seats to the SPD's 29. However, neither the conventional CDU–FDP or SPD–Green blocs held a majority; the SSW held balance of power. The SPD attempted to form a government with the Greens and the support of the SSW, which held a one-seat majority. However, this unexpectedly failed in the Landtag. Subsequently, the CDU formed a grand coalition with the SPD.

Ralf Stegner became leader of the Schleswig-Holstein SPD in March 2007, after which point the relationship between the parties of government began to deteriorate. His criticism of the CDU led them to demand he resign as Minister of the Interior, which he did in January 2008. In September of the same year he was chosen as the SPD's lead candidate for the next state election, which was expected to take place in 2010.

Throughout 2009, the government's management of the Hamburg Commercial Bank crisis was a point of contention within the coalition. In June, it risked collapse as the SPD refused to approve deep cuts to public spending to support the bank. Ultimately the breakup was averted, as the parties came to an agreement. In July, Minister-President Carstensen and the CDU stated that the controversial bonus payments made to the CEO of the Hamburg Commercial Bank had been approved by the SPD, which the SPD denied.

On 15 July, the CDU announced it would end the coalition with the SPD and request the dissolution of the Landtag. The SPD unanimously rejected this in the Landtag in 20 July, causing the vote to fail. The next day, Minister-President Carstensen dismissed all members of the SPD from cabinet and called a motion of confidence in the Landtag on 23 July; the government was defeated, allowing Carstensen to call new elections.

== Parties ==
The table below lists parties represented in the previous Landtag of Schleswig-Holstein.

Name		Ideology	Leader(s)	2005 result	
Name		Ideology	Leader(s)	Votes (%)	Seats
CDU	Christian Democratic Union of Germany; Christlich Demokratische Union Deutschlands	Christian democracy	Peter Harry Carstensen	40.2%	30 / 69
SPD	Social Democratic Party of Germany; Sozialdemokratische Partei Deutschlands	Social democracy	Ralf Stegner	38.7%	29 / 69
FDP	Free Democratic Party; Freie Demokratische Partei	Classical liberalism	Wolfgang Kubicki	6.6%	4 / 69
Grüne	Alliance 90/The Greens; Bündnis 90/Die Grünen	Green politics	Monika Heinold; Robert Habeck	6.2%	4 / 69
SSW	South Schleswig Voters' Association; Südschleswigscher Wählerverband	Danish and Frisian minority interests	Anke Spoorendonk	3.6%	2 / 69

== Opinion polling ==
Polling firm	Fieldwork date	Sample size	CDU	SPD	FDP	Grüne	SSW	Linke	Others	Lead
2009 state election	27 September 2009	–	31.5	25.4	14.9	12.4	4.3	6.0	5.4	6.1
GMS	18–20 Sep 2009	1,006	31	28	14	13	4	6	4	3
Forsa	16–18 Sep 2009	752	31	26	16	11	5	6	5	5
Forschungsgruppe Wahlen	14–17 Sep 2009	1,000	32	27	14	12	4	7	4	5
Infratest dimap	14–16 Sep 2009	1,000	33	25	14	13	5	6	4	8
Infratest dimap	7–9 Sep 2009	1,002	33	24	15	12	4	8	4	9
Infratest dimap	31 Aug–2 Sep 2009	1,003	33	24	16	14	3	7	3	9
IfM Leipzig	23 Jul 2009	804	32	23	17	15	4	5	4	9
Infratest dimap	16–17 Jul 2009	1,007	36	24	15	14	3	5	3	12
Psephos	16–17 Jul 2009	672	39	25	14	11	4	4	3	14
Forsa	16 Jul 2009	681	38	27	14	8	4	5	4	11
Infratest dimap	8–13 May 2009	1,000	37	27	15	11	3	4	3	10
dimap	20–24 Feb 2009	1,008	38	29	14	9	3	3	4	9
dimap	3–7 Dec 2008	1,005	40	31	10	9	3	4	3	9
Emnid	8–19 Nov 2007	1,005	39	31	10	9	3	4	4	8
dimap	1–7 Nov 2007	1,000	40	34	8	9	3	4	2	6
Psephos	19–20 Sep 2007	607	39	35	7	8	4	4	3	4
Forsa	30 Jul–2 Aug 2007	1,070	40	32	8	9	4	3	4	8
dimap	29 May–3 Jun 2007	1,000	39	33	9	10	3	3	3	6
IfM Leipzig	26–29 Mar 2007	1,000	38	36	7	10	3	2	4	2
Emnid	3–14 Nov 2006	1,002	38	30	11	11	3	3	4	8
dimap	13 Jun 2006	~1,000	41	33	8	9	3	–	6	8
Infratest dimap	28 Jul–3 Aug 2005	1,000	47	30	7	7	3	4	2	17
Forsa	24 Mar 2005	?	51	31	5	5	3	–	5	20
2005 state election	20 February 2005	–	40.2	38.7	6.6	6.2	3.6	0.8	3.9	1.5

== Election result ==
Summary of the 27 September 2009 election results for the Landtag of Schleswig-Holstein
Party	Votes	%	+/-	Seats	+/-	Seats %
Christian Democratic Union (CDU)	505,612	31.5	▼8.7	34	▲4	35.8
Social Democratic Party (SPD)	407,643	25.4	▼13.3	25	▼4	26.3
Free Democratic Party (FDP)	239,338	14.9	▲8.3	14	▲10	14.7
Alliance 90/The Greens (Grüne)	199,367	12.4	▲6.2	12	▲8	12.6
The Left (Linke)	95,764	6.0	▲5.8 (Note: Compared to results for PDS.)	6	▲6 (Note: Compared to results for PDS.)	6.3
South Schleswig Voters' Association (SSW)	69,701	4.3	▲0.7	4	▲2	4.2
Pirate Party Germany (Piraten)	28,837	1.8	New	0	New	0
Free Voters (FW)	16,362	1.0	▲1.0	0	±0	0
Others	40,782	2.5		0	±0	0
Total	1,603,406	100.0		95	▲26	
Voter turnout		73.6	▲7.1			

Popular Vote
CDU	31.53%
SPD	25.42%
FDP	14.93%
B'90/GRÜNE	12.43%
DIE LINKE	5.97%
SSW	4.35%
Other	5.36%

Landtag seats
CDU	35.79%
SPD	26.32%
FDP	14.74%
B'90/GRÜNE	12.63%
DIE LINKE	6.32%
SSW	4.21%

== Outcome ==
The CDU and FDP won a narrow majority of 49 seats (later revised to 48). The CDU therefore chose to enter government with the FDP rather than seek a new grand coalition with the SPD.

=== Recount in Husum III ===
The initial result of the election stated that the FDP won 15 seats and The Left won 5. In January 2010, The Left requested a recount of ballots in the Husum III constituency, which found that The Left had won 41 list votes, rather than the 9 originally reported. The results were recalculated and The Left was determined to have won one additional seat for a total of six, with the FDP losing its 15th seat. This reduced the size of the CDU–FDP government from 49 to 48, a narrow majority of one seat.

=== Legal challenge against the election result ===
After the election, a dispute arose regarding the electoral law. In Schleswig-Holstein, the standard size of the Landtag is 69 seats, of which 40 are single-member "direct mandates", and the remaining 29 are distributed based on compensatory proportional representation. German electoral law conventionally seeks to create overall proportionality in legislatures; ie, the ratio of seats distributed between each party should, as closely as possible, match the ratio of votes won between each party.

In the 2009 election, the CDU won a large majority of the 40 direct mandates, meaning it held 11 more seats than was proportional in the 69-seat Landtag. The Schleswig-Holstein electoral law contains provisions to allocate leveling seats in this situation. However, the wording of the electoral law was ambiguous, making it unclear whether 14 or 20 leveling seats should be added. On 16 October, the state returning officer stated that 14 seats should be added. The members of the electoral commission (the state returning officer and six party representatives) subsequently voted on this proposal, with 3 voting in favour, 2 against, and 2 abstentions. The returning officer, CDU, and FDP representatives voted in favour.

The size of the Landtag was therefore set to 95 seats. This left the CDU and FDP with 49 seats (a two-seat majority) while the SPD, Greens, Left, and SSW held 46 seats between them. This was despite the fact that the CDU and FDP had together won 744,950 votes (46.5%), fewer than the other four parties, which together won 772,475 (48.2%). This was because 14 leveling seats were not sufficient to create true proportionality, and the CDU was still overrepresented in the Landtag. If the electoral commission had allocated 20 leveling seats rather than 14, proportionality would have been achieved, and the CDU and FDP would have held 50 out of 101 seats, just short of a majority.

The Greens and SSW sought a legal challenge to the disproportionate result; The Left joined this challenge after the sitting of the new Landtag. The case was heard by the Constitutional Court of Schleswig-Holstein on 28 June 2010. The verdict, announced on 30 August, was that the electoral law was unconstitutional. The court ruled that the law must be changed by 31 May 2011, and a new state election held no later than 30 September 2012. However, the result from the 2009 election was allowed to stand, so the government continued with its majority intact.

A new electoral law was passed by the Landtag on 25 March 2011, and on 7 June, the election date was set for 6 May 2012.
