= Anke Spoorendonk =

German politician

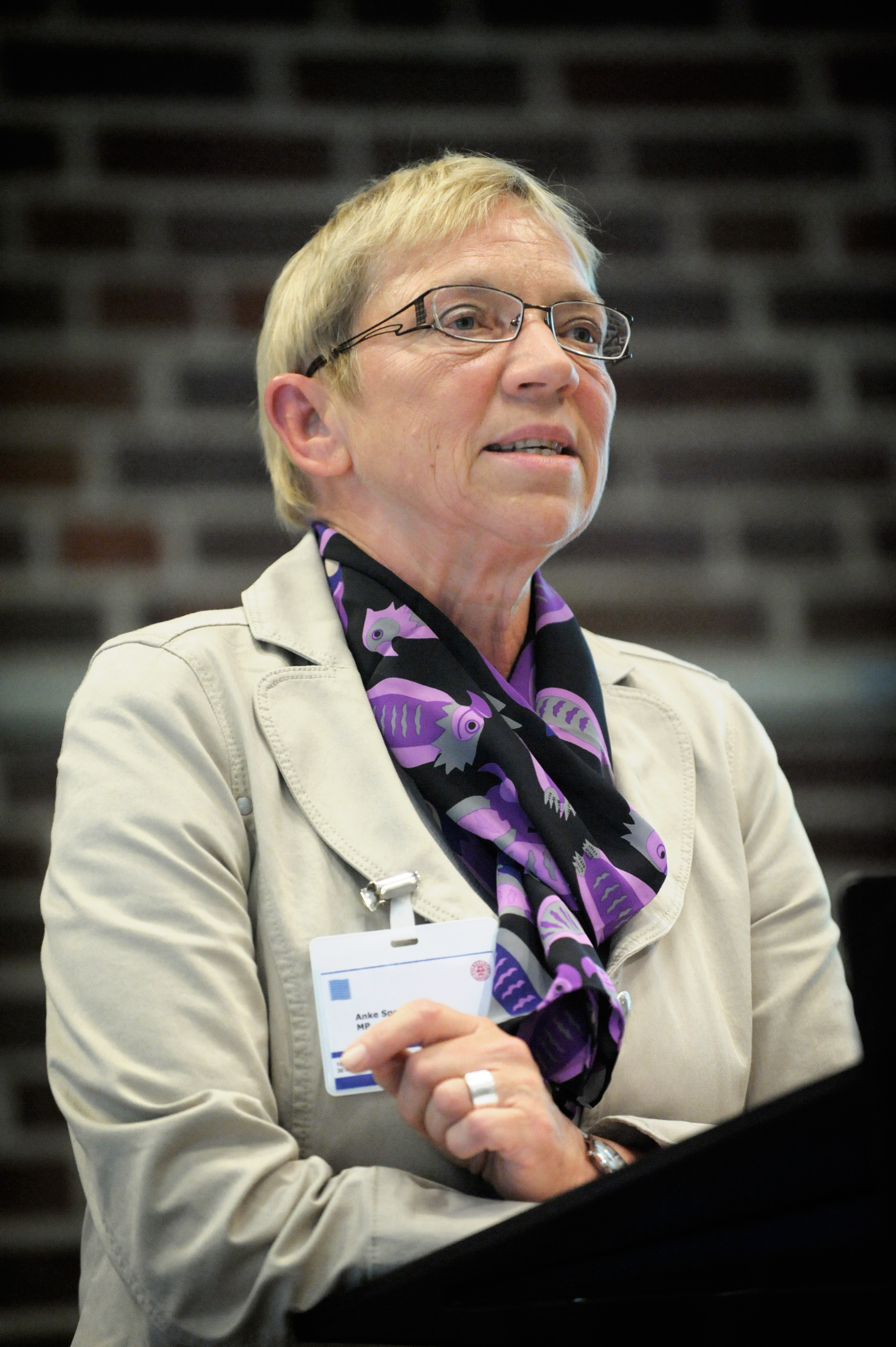

Member of the Landtag of Schleswig-Holstein
- In office 1996–2012

Schleswig-Holstein Minister of Justice, Culture and European Affairs
- In office 12 June 2012 – 28 June 2017
- Appointed by: Torsten Albig
- Succeeded by: Sabine Sütterlin-Waack

Personal details
- Born: Hinrichsen; September 21, 1947 (age 78) Busdorf, Germany
- Party: SSW South Schleswig Voters' Association

Anke Spoorendonk (born 21 September 1947 in Busdorf) is a German politician from the South Schleswig Voters' Association (SSW). From 12 June 2012, until 28 June 2017 she was the Minister of Justice, Culture and European Affairs in the state government of Schleswig-Holstein.

== Life ==
Spoorendonk is a part of the Danish minority in Schleswig-Holstein. In 1976, she graduated from the University of Copenhagen with a master's degree in German studies and History. From 1977 to 1996 she was a teacher at the Duborg-Skolen in Flensburg. Spoorendonk is a widow and has two children.

== Political life ==
From 1996 to 2012, she was a member of the Landtag of Schleswig-Holstein, representing the SSW, which represents the interests of the Danish and the Frisian minorities. In this period she was as well the leader of the SSW group in the state parliament.

After the 2012 election, she was appointed minister for Justice, Culture and European Affairs in the newly formed coalition government called Coastal Coalition which consisted of the Social Democrats, the Green Party and the SSW. It was the first time in history that this coalition has been formed. The government was led by the Social Democrat Torsten Albig.

Because of her appointment as a minister, she resigned her office as a member of the Landtag to pass it on to another representative from her party the SSW.
