= Torsten Albig =

German politician (born 1963)

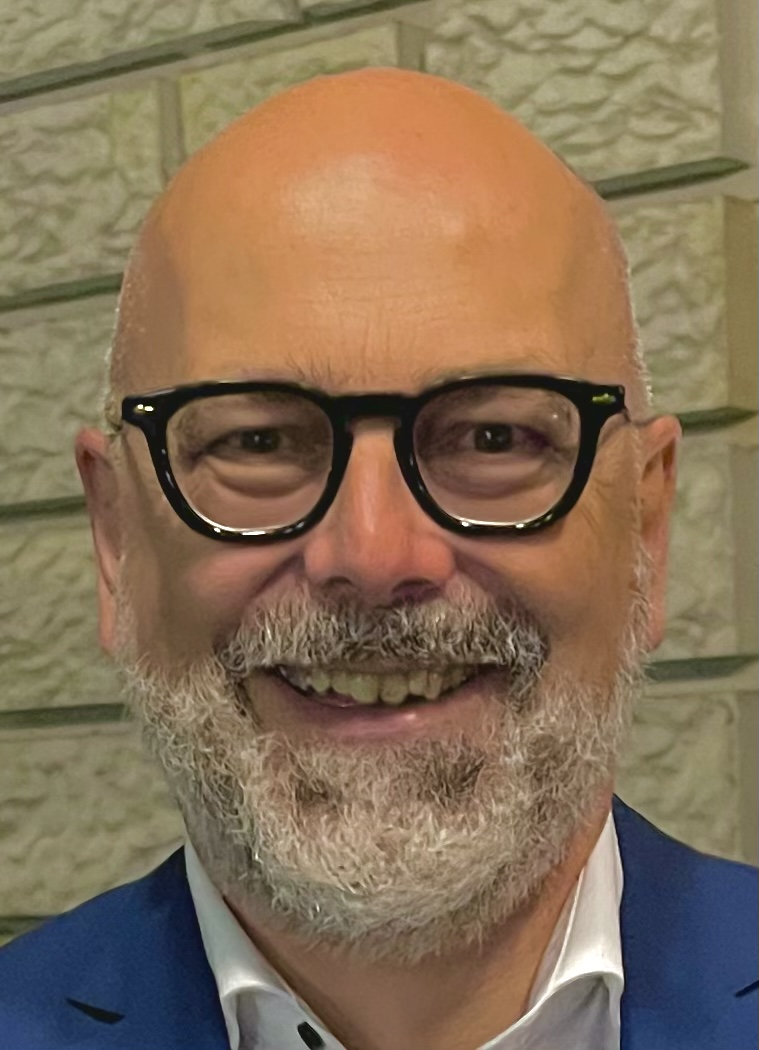
- Albig in 2021, out of office

Minister-President of Schleswig-Holstein
- In office 12 June 2012 – 28 June 2017
- Deputy: Robert Habeck
- Preceded by: Peter Harry Carstensen
- Succeeded by: Daniel Günther

Lord Mayor of Kiel
- In office 11 June 2009 – 6 May 2012
- Preceded by: Angelika Volquartz
- Succeeded by: Susanne Gaschke

Member of the Landtag of Schleswig-Holstein
- In office 5 June 2012 – 6 June 2017
- Preceded by: Ralf Stegner
- Succeeded by: Tobias von Pein
- Constituency: Social Democratic List

Personal details
- Born: 25 May 1963 (age 63) Bremen, West Germany
- Party: Social Democratic Party (SPD) (1982–)
- Profession: Civil servant

Torsten Albig (born 25 May 1963) is a German politician from the Social Democratic Party of Germany. From 2012 until 2017 he served as the 13th Minister President of Schleswig-Holstein. Since 2023, he has been the head of external affairs at Philip Morris International's German subsidiary.

== Early life and education ==
Albig grew up in Ostholstein and Bielefeld. After graduating from high school in 1982, he first studied history and social sciences at Bielefeld University but later changed to law.

== Political career ==
=== Lord Mayor of Kiel, 2009–2012 ===
From 2009 to 2012 Albig was the Lord Mayor of Kiel, the state capital of Schleswig-Holstein.

=== Minister-President of Schleswig-Holstein, 2012–2017 ===
Torsten Albig was appointed candidate for Minister-President, representing his party, the SPD, in 2011 after a member's decision. At the election in 2012, the SPD achieved 30.4% of the votes, not enough to beat the ruling CDU that got 30.8% of the popular vote. Both the SPD and CDU achieved 22 seats each, and the election result made it possible for Albig to form a coalition government with the participation of the Green Party and the SSW, which is a regional party representing the Danish and Frisian minorities. The three parties had a narrow majority in the Landtag of Schleswig-Holstein with 35 of 69 seats. At the appointment in parliament though, he got 37 of 69 possible votes. The new-formed government of Schleswig-Holstein consisting of the SPD, The Green Party and the SSW had never been seen before in German history.

Albig succeeded Peter Harry Carstensen in the position as Minister-President of Schleswig-Holstein.

Albig served as an SPD delegate to the Federal Convention for the purpose of electing the President of Germany in 2012 and 2017. Together with Doris Ahnen, Martin Dulig, Heiko Maas and Manuela Schwesig, he co-chaired the SPD’s national convention in Leipzig in 2013.

In the negotiations to form a Grand Coalition of Chancellor Angela Merkel's Christian Democrats (CDU together with the Bavarian CSU) and the SPD following the 2013 federal elections, Albig was part of the SPD delegation in the working group on transport, building and infrastructure, led by Peter Ramsauer and Florian Pronold.

In 2015, Albig – alongside First Mayor of Hamburg Olaf Scholz – negotiated a restructuring deal with the European Commission that allowed the German regional lender HSH Nordbank to offload €6.2 billion in troubled assets – mainly non-performing ship loans – onto its government majority owners and avoid being shut down, saving around 2,500 jobs.

== Life after politics ==
From 2018 to 2021, Albig worked as Vice President Corporate Representation of Deutsche Post in Brussels. Since 2023, he has been responsible for external affairs at Philip Morris International's German subsidiary.

== Other activities ==
- HSH Nordbank Art Foundation, vice chairman of the board of trustees
- Schleswig-Holstein Musik Festival, chairman of the board of trustees (-2017)
- University Medical Center Schleswig Holstein, ex-officio chairman of the board of trustees (-2017)
- Förde Sparkasse, ex-officio member of the supervisory board (2008–2010)

== Personal life ==
Albig is married and has two children.

== See also ==
- List of minister-presidents of Schleswig-Holstein

Preceded by Peter Harry Carstensen	Minister President of Schleswig-Holstein; 12 June 2012 – 28 June 2017	Succeeded by Daniel Günther
Preceded by Angelika Volquartz	Mayor of Kiel; 11 June 2009 – 6 May 2012	Succeeded by Peter Todeskino; Acting
