= 2005 Schleswig-Holstein state election =

German state election

- 20 February 2005

All 69 seats of the Landtag of Schleswig-Holstein 35 seats needed for a majority
- Turnout: 1,434,805 (66.5%) ▼3.0%
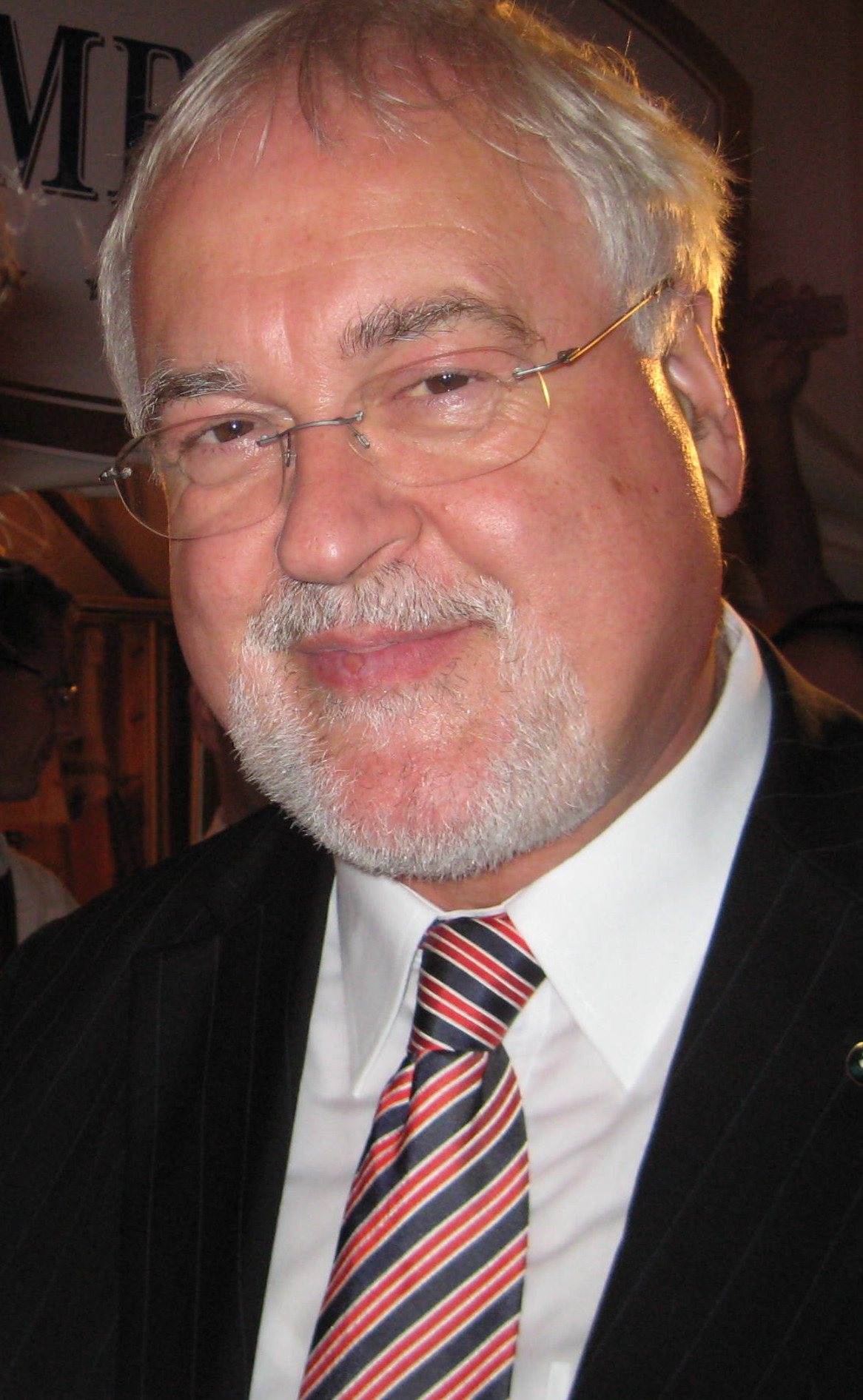

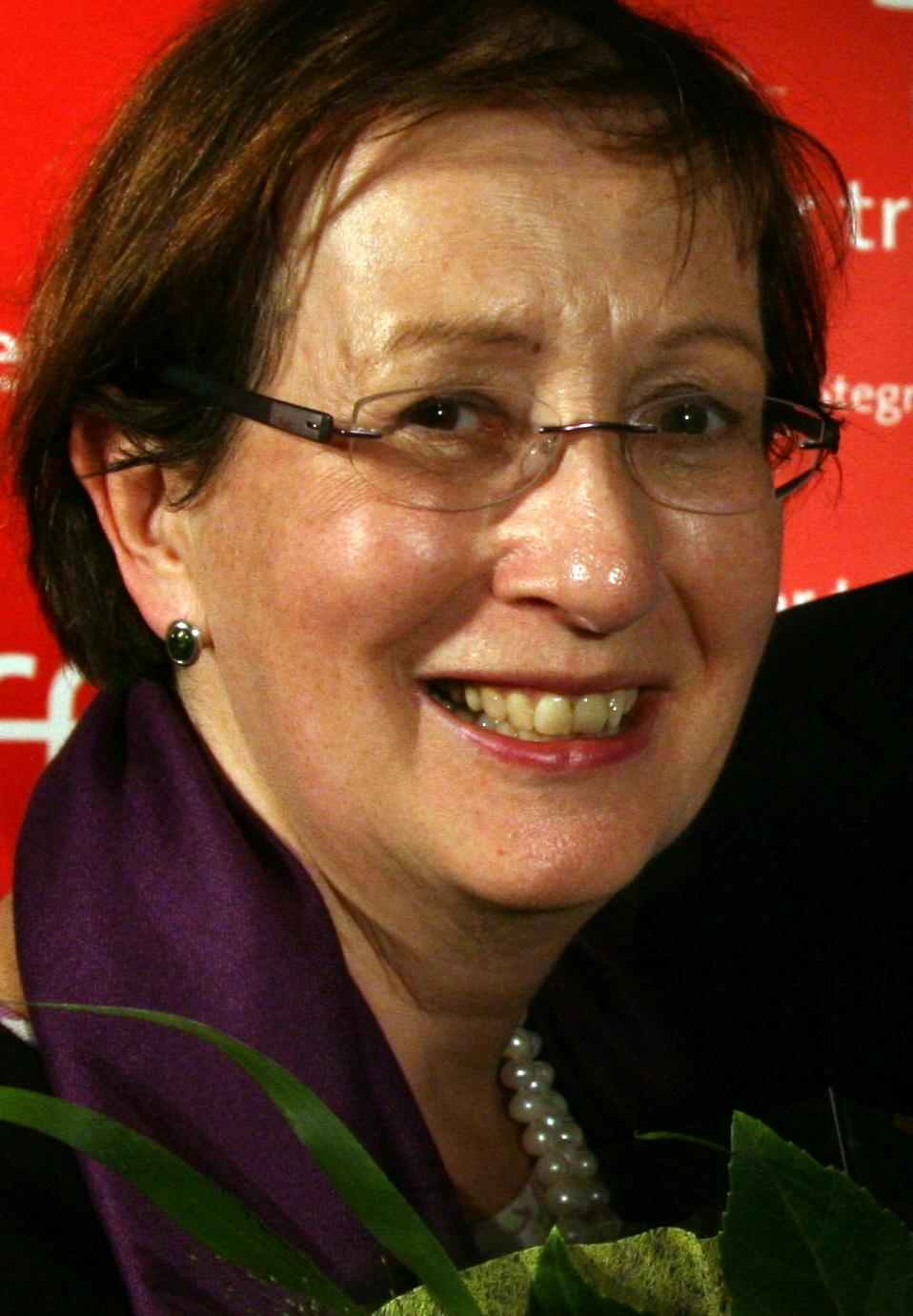

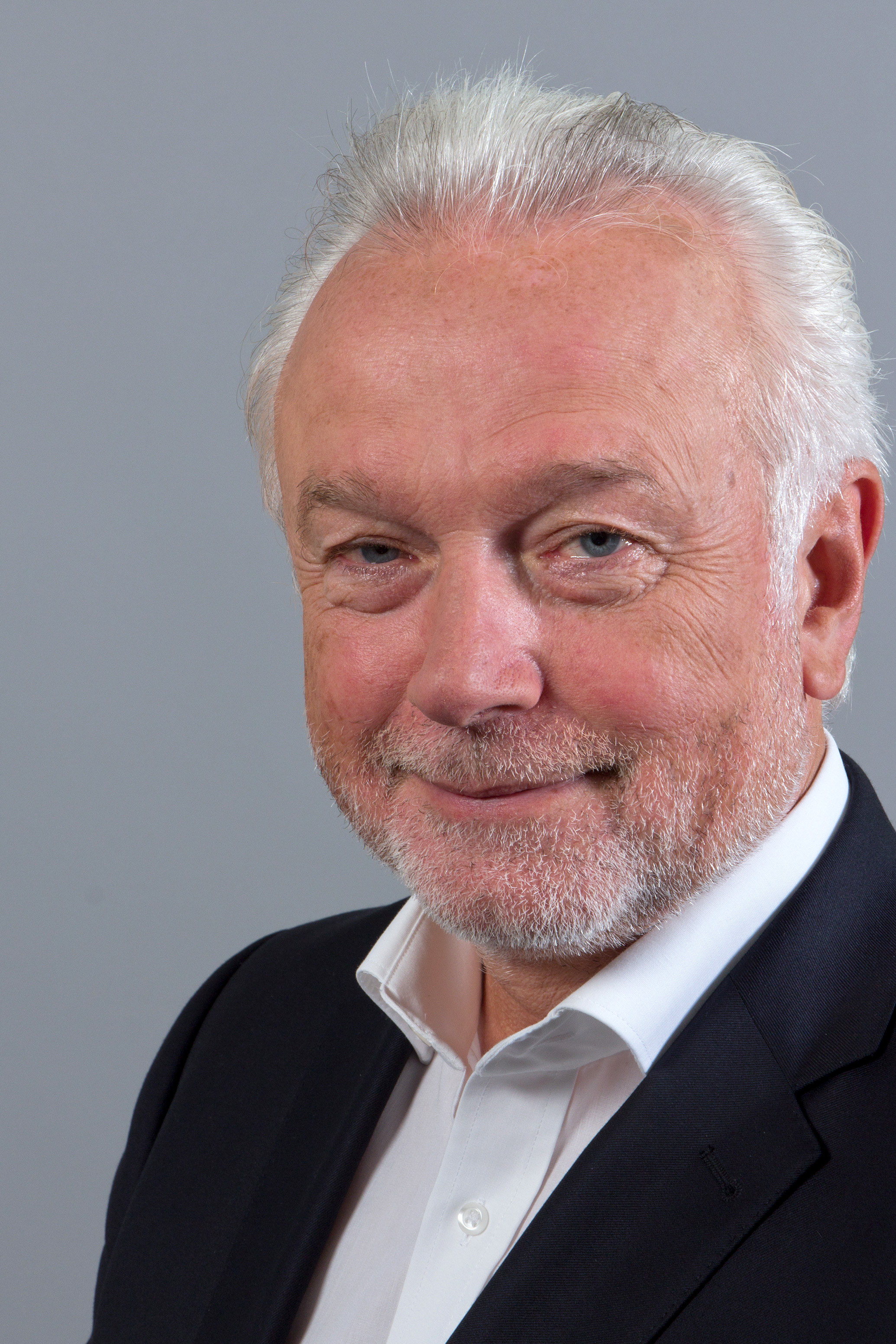

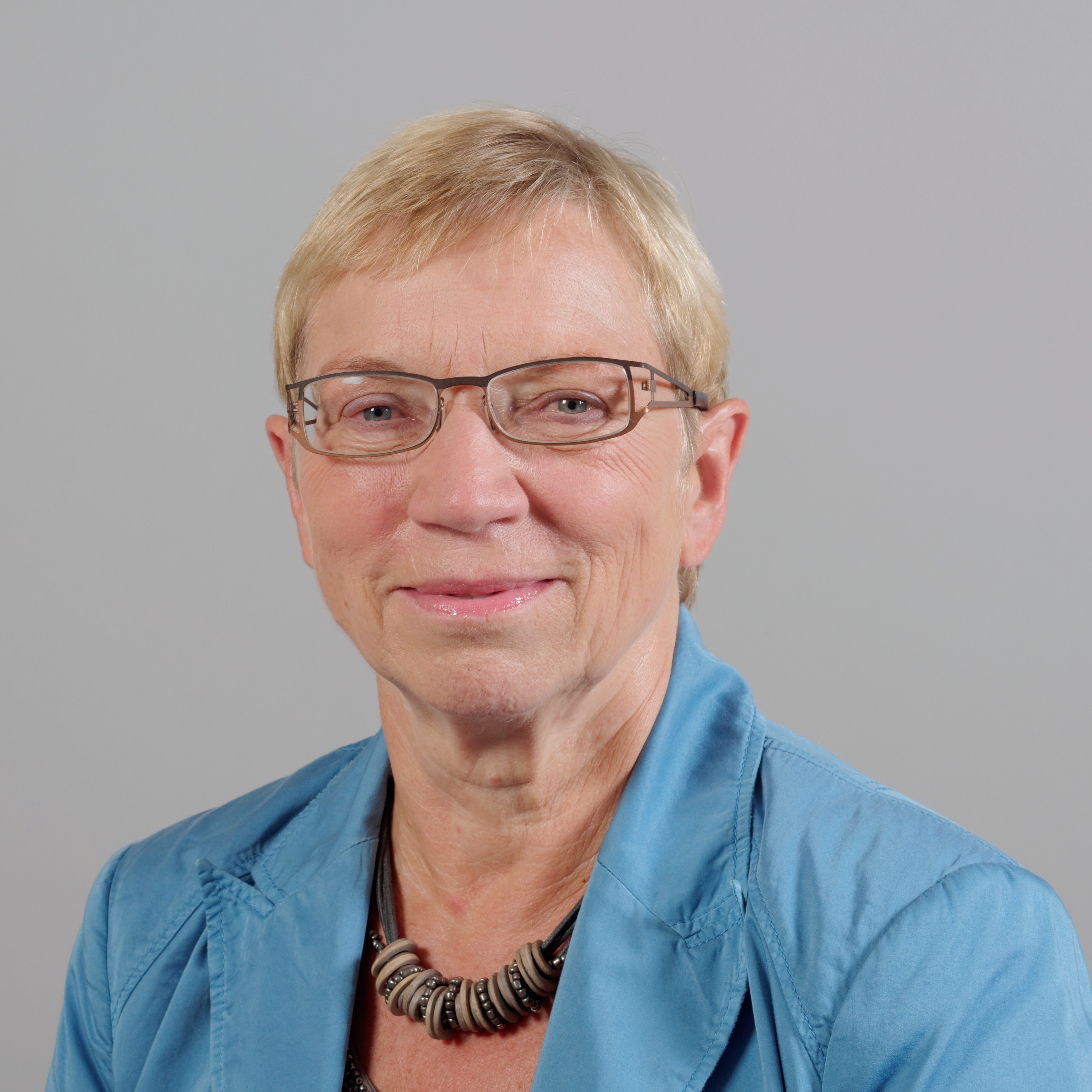
	First party	Second party	Third party
Leader	Peter Harry Carstensen	Heide Simonis	Wolfgang Kubicki
Party	CDU	SPD	FDP
Last election	33 seats, 35.2%	41 seats, 43.1%	7 seats, 7.6%
Seats won	30	29	4
Seat change	▼3	▼12	▼3
Popular vote	576,095	554,879	94,935
Percentage	40.2%	38.7%	6.6%
Swing	▲5.0%	▼4.4%	▼1.0%
	Fourth party	Fifth party
Leader	Annemarie Lütkes	Anke Spoorendonk
Party	Greens	SSW
Last election	5 seats, 6.2%	3 seats, 4.1%
Seats won	4	2
Seat change	▼1	▼1
Popular vote	89,387	51,920
Percentage	6.2%	3.6%
Swing	0.0%	▼0.5%
- Results for the single-member constituencies
Minister-President before election
Heide Simonis
SPD
Elected Minister-President
Peter Harry Carstensen
CDU

The 2005 Schleswig-Holstein state election was held on 20 February 2005 to elect the members of the Landtag of Schleswig-Holstein. The incumbent coalition government of the Social Democratic Party (SPD) and The Greens led by Minister-President Heide Simonis was defeated, bringing an end to 17 years of SPD governments in the state.

The result was a deadlock, with the right-wing parties (CDU and FDP) being one seat short of majority and the left-wing parties (SPD and the Greens) two seats short, with SSW thus holding the balance of power.

After a failed attempt to invest a minority SPD–Green government supported by the South Schleswig Voters' Association (SSW), the SPD agreed to join a grand coalition with the Christian Democratic Union (CDU). CDU leader Peter Harry Carstensen was subsequently elected Minister-President.

== Campaign and issues ==
Surveys before the election indicated that most voters considered high unemployment in Germany and Schleswig-Holstein to be the key issue of the campaign. Pre-election polls indicated that the personal popularity of Heide Simonis was still high, though, and that the SPD–Green coalition had the support of a plurality of voters. However, the unpopularity of the federal SPD and the Hartz IV reforms appeared to have taken a toll.

== Parties ==
The table below lists parties represented in the previous Landtag of Schleswig-Holstein.

Name		Ideology	Leader(s)	2000 result	
Name		Ideology	Leader(s)	Votes (%)	Seats
SPD	Social Democratic Party of Germany; Sozialdemokratische Partei Deutschlands	Social democracy	Heide Simonis	43.1%	41 / 89
CDU	Christian Democratic Union of Germany; Christlich Demokratische Union Deutschlands	Christian democracy	Peter Harry Carstensen	35.2%	33 / 89
FDP	Free Democratic Party; Freie Demokratische Partei	Classical liberalism	Wolfgang Kubicki	7.6%	7 / 89
Grüne	Alliance 90/The Greens; Bündnis 90/Die Grünen	Green politics	Annemarie Lütkes	6.2%	5 / 89
SSW	South Schleswig Voters' Association; Südschleswigscher Wählerverband	Danish and Frisian minority interests	Anke Spoorendonk	4.1%	3 / 89

== Opinion polling ==
Polling firm	Fieldwork date	Sample size	SPD	CDU	FDP	Grüne	SSW	Others	Lead
2005 state election	20 Feb 2005	–	38.7	40.2	6.6	6.2	3.6	4.7	1.5
Forsa	16 Feb 2005	1,002	40	37	7	6	4	6	3
Universität Kiel	17 Jan–11 Feb 2005	750	39.4	37.3	7.0	10.6	3.3	1.2	2.1
Forschungsgruppe Wahlen	8–10 Feb 2005	1,106	40	37	7	7	4	5	3
Infratest dimap	7–9 Feb 2005	1,000	41	36	7	7.5	3	5.5	5
Forsa	1–4 Feb 2005	1,059	40	37	7	7	3	6	3
Infratest dimap	14–18 Jan 2005	1,000	40	37	7	8	3	5	3
Forsa	17–21 Dec 2004	752	39	37	7	7	4	6	2
Infratest dimap	8–13 Dec 2004	1,000	38	39	7	8	3	5	1
Infratest dimap	1–3 Nov 2004	1,000	38	39	6	10	3	4	1
Infratest dimap	18–23 Aug 2004	1,000	31	42	7	11	4	5	11
Forsa	22 Aug 2004	?	32	40	8	9	5	6	8
dimap	7–12 May 2004	1,005	31	48	6	9	4	2	17
Forsa	22 Feb 2004	?	33	44	8	8	4	3	11
dimap	17 Dec 2003	?	29	48	6	9	4	4	19
dimap	2 May 2001	1,005	41	35	10	6	4	4	6
2000 state election	27 Feb 2000	–	43.1	35.2	7.6	6.2	4.1	3.7	7.9

== Election result ==
Summary of the 20 February 2005 election results for the Landtag of Schleswig-Holstein
Party	Votes	%	+/-	Seats	+/-	Seats %
Christian Democratic Union (CDU)	576,095	40.2	▲5.0	30	▼3	43.5
Social Democratic Party (SPD)	554,879	38.7	▼4.4	29	▼12	42.0
Free Democratic Party (FDP)	94,935	6.6	▼1.0	4	▼3	5.8
Alliance 90/The Greens (Grüne)	89,387	6.2	0.0	4	▼1	5.8
South Schleswig Voters' Association (SSW)	51,920	3.6	▼0.5	2	▼1	2.9
National Democratic Party (NPD)	27,676	1.9	▲0.9	0	±0	0
Others	39,913	2.8		0	±0	0
Total	1,434,805	100.0		69	▼20	
Voter turnout		66.5	▼3.0			

Popular Vote
CDU	40.15%
SPD	38.67%
FDP	6.62%
B'90/GRÜNE	6.23%
SSW	3.62%
Other	4.71%

Landtag seats
CDU	43.48%
SPD	42.03%
FDP	5.80%
B'90/GRÜNE	5.80%
SSW	2.90%

== Outcome ==
After the election, the SPD–Green coalition no longer commanded a majority of the Landtag. The SSW announced that although it would not enter a coalition, it saw more common ground with the SPD than the CDU. Minister-President Simonis proceeded to form an SPD–Green coalition based on an agreement with the SSW backing it.

On 17 March, the vote to invest the government failed, with the secret ballot tying 34–34. It is not known who abstained, though it is widely believed to have been a representative of the SPD. Since the coalition had failed, the SPD was forced to negotiate a grand coalition agreement with the CDU, capitulating to the CDU's demand that CDU leader Peter Harry Carstensen replace Simonis as Minister-President.
