= Peter Harry Carstensen =

German politician

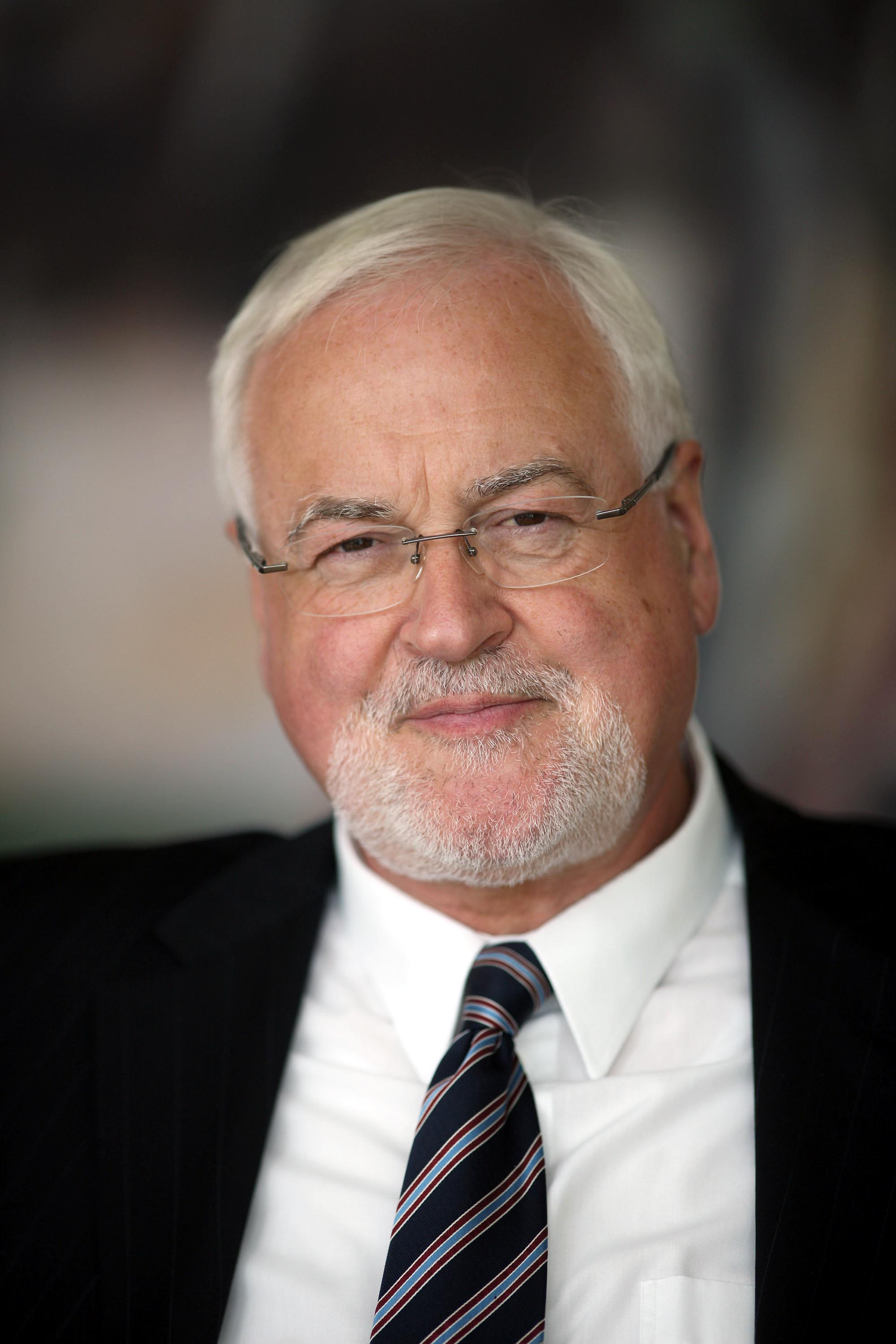
- Peter Harry Carstensen in 2010

Minister President of Schleswig-Holstein
- In office 27 April 2005 – 12 June 2012
- President: Horst Köhler; Christian Wulff; Joachim Gauck
- Chancellor: Gerhard Schröder; Angela Merkel
- Preceded by: Heide Simonis
- Succeeded by: Torsten Albig

Chairman of CDU Schleswig-Holstein
- In office 2 June 2002 – 18 September 2010
- Succeeded by: Christian von Boetticher

Member of the Bundestag
- In office 29 March 1983 – 19 April 2005

President of the Bundesrat
- In office 1 November 2005 – 31 October 2006
- Preceded by: Matthias Platzeck
- Succeeded by: Harald Ringstorff

Personal details
- Born: 12 March 1947 (age 79) Elisabeth-Sophien-Koog, Schleswig-Holstein, Germany
- Party: CDU Christian Democratic Union of Germany (CDU)
- Spouse: Sandra Carstensen
- Education: University of Kiel
- Profession: Teacher

Peter Harry Carstensen (born 12 March 1947) is a German politician of the Christian Democratic Union (CDU). From 2005 to 2012 he was Minister President of the state of Schleswig-Holstein, serving as President of the Bundesrat in 2005/06.

== Early life, education and career ==
Carstensen was born in Elisabeth-Sophien-Koog/Nordstrand, on the North Sea coast of the German state of Schleswig-Holstein. He passed his Abitur in 1966 and worked in agriculture before beginning a course of study in agronomy in 1968, finishing in 1973 as a qualified engineer. During his studies Carstensen became a member of the Landsmannschaft Troglodytia im Coburger Convent and did not leave the organisation until 1998. In 1976 he passed the Second State Examination (Zweites Staatsexamen) to become a teacher, following which he was employed as a teacher of agriculture at the Bredstedt Agricultural School and also as an economics adviser in the Agricultural Ministry of Schleswig-Holstein until 1983.

== Political career ==
Carstensen has been a member of the CDU since 1971. From 1986 to 1992 he was leader of the local CDU in the Nordfriesland district, becoming leader on 2 June 2002.

=== Member of the German Parliament, 1983–2005 ===
From 1983 Carstensen was a member of the Bundestag. From 1994 to 2002 he was chairman of the committee for Nutrition, Agriculture and Forestry (after the renaming of the corresponding ministry in 2001 the committee became responsible for Consumer Protection, Nutrition and Agriculture). In his last parliamentary term he was a full member of the committee. From October 2002 Carstensen was chairman of the CDU/CSU working party for Consumer Protection, Nutrition and Agriculture in the Bundestag. Peter Harry Carstensen was the representative of Nordfriesland – Dithmarschen Nord, receiving 44.3% of all votes cast in the 2005 election. Carstensen left the Bundestag on 20 April 2005.

=== Minister-President of Schleswig-Holstein, 2005–2012 ===
Carstensen was the CDU's candidate for premier of Schleswig-Holstein in the state election of 20 February 2005; he led the CDU to its best result since Uwe Barschel’s resignation in 1987 with 40.2% of all votes cast, making the CDU the strongest party in the state parliament for the first time since 1983. However, the coalition of the CDU and the Free Democratic Party (FDP) failed to obtain a majority by some 700 votes. The Social Democrat (SPD) office-holder Heide Simonis thus tried to form a minority cabinet of the SPD and Bündnis '90/Die Grünen (the Green party) tolerated by the Danish minority party SSW.

From 1 March to 27 April 2005 Carstensen was leader of the CDU in the state parliament.

In the vote to decide the premier of Schleswig-Holstein in the opening session of the state parliament on 17 March 2005 incumbent Heide Simonis (SPD) did not receive the required majority. Subsequently successful negotiations between the SPD and CDU led to the formation of a grand coalition between SPD and CDU. On 27 April 2005 Carstensen was finally elected premier of the state of Schleswig-Holstein with a majority of 54 votes (out of the grand coalition’s 59).

In February 2009, Carstensen and Mayor Ole von Beust of Hamburg agreed on a €13 billion bailout of state-owned shipping financier HSH Nordbank. The two states were forced to intervene after the SoFFin fund, which had been set up by the federal government in 2008 to stabilize the financial markets, said it could not help out HSH Nordbank until it got rid of all its bad debts.

In July 2009 Carstensen announced that he would seek early state elections as a result of ongoing quarrels within the coalition government. After the Elections of 27 September 2009 Carstensen was reelected on 27 October 2009.

During his time as Minister-President, Carstensen also served as President of the Bundesrat, Germany's upper house of parliament. He served as a CDU delegate to the Federal Convention for the purpose of electing the President of Germany in 2010 and 2012.

== Life after politics ==
From 2020 to 2022, Carstens served in the honorary office of State Commissioner for Jewish Life and the Fight against Anti-Semitism in the government of Minister-President of Schleswig-Holstein Daniel Günther.

== Political positions ==
Ahead of the Christian Democrats’ leadership election in 2018, Carstensen publicly endorsed Friedrich Merz to succeed Angela Merkel as the party’s chair.

== Recognition ==
Carstensen was awarded the Order of the Federal Republic of Germany (Bundesverdienstkreuz) in 1996.

== Personal life ==
Carstensen is widowed and has two daughters. His younger daughter is the ceramicist Anja-Christina Carstensen. In August 2004 the Bild newspaper hunted for a new wife with Carstensen’s agreement - a decision that he later regretted.

On his 60th birthday, Carstensen publicly announced his new relationship with Sandra Thomsen, a lawyer born in 1971. Two and a half years later — on 31 December 2009 — the two were married in the Friesenstube of the Island Hotel Arfsten in Wrixum.

== See also ==
- List of minister-presidents of Schleswig-Holstein
