= 2026 Free Democratic Party of Germany leadership election =

German political party leadership election

2026 Free Democratic Party leadership election
- 30 May 2026

658 delegates 330 votes needed to win
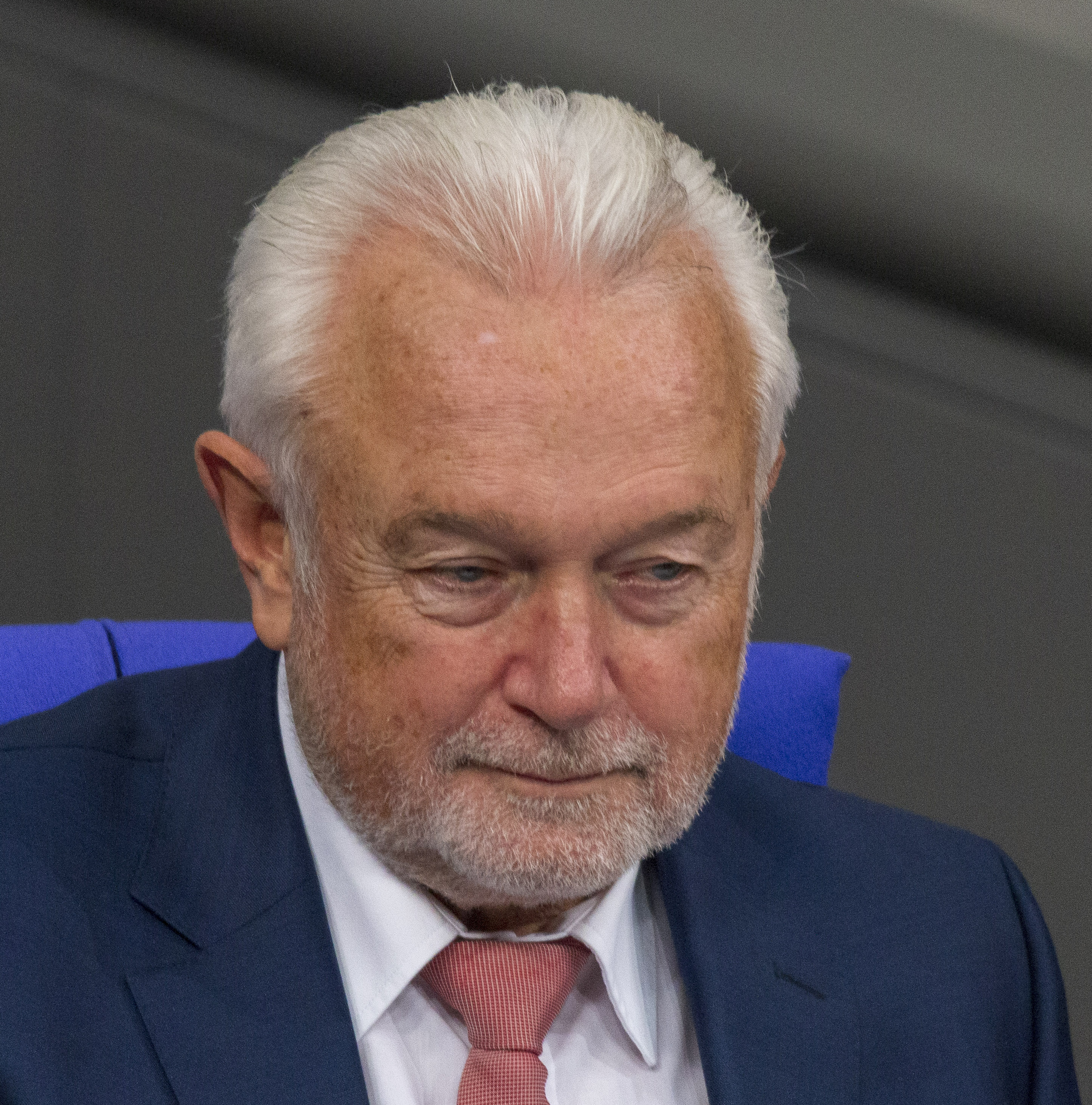

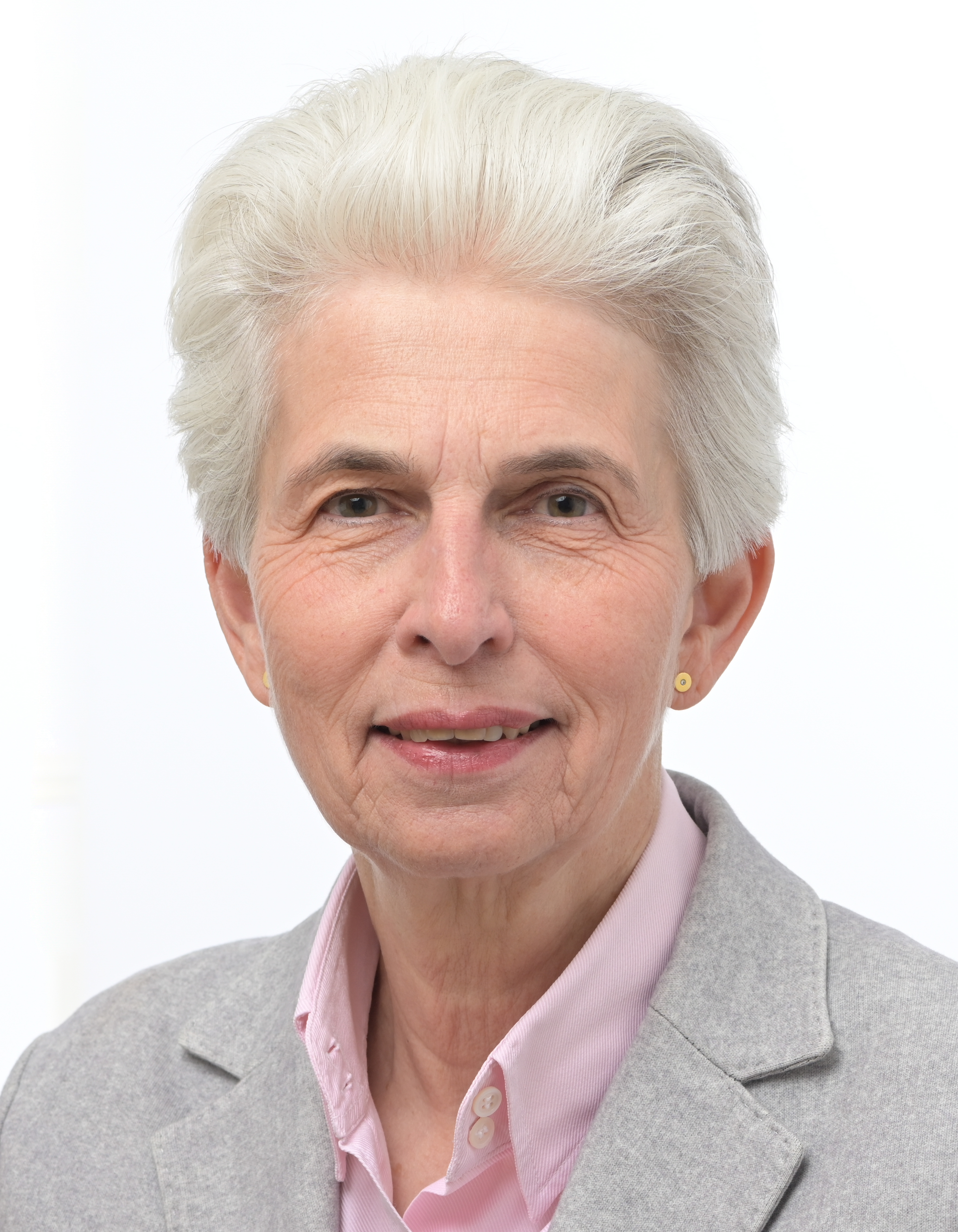
Candidate	Wolfgang Kubicki	Marie-Agnes Strack-Zimmermann
Home state	Schleswig-Holstein	North Rhine-Westphalia
Popular vote	390	259
Percentage	59.27%	39.36%
Leader before election
Christian Dürr
Elected Leader
Wolfgang Kubicki

The 2026 Free Democratic Party of Germany leadership election took place on 30 May 2026 to elect the Leader of the Free Democratic Party. The vote comes after the FDP failed to reach the 5% threshold in the Baden-Württemberg and Rhineland-Palatinate elections causing a new conference to elect leadership. Wolfgang Kubicki won with 59.27% of the vote.

== Candidates ==
=== Declared ===
- Wolfgang Kubicki, deputy leader
- Marie-Agnes Strack-Zimmermann
- Christian Dürr, incumbent chairman
- Henning Höne, FDP North Rhine-Westphalia leader
