= Soest (electoral district) =

Federal electoral district of Germany

145 Soest
- Electoral district for the Bundestag
- Soest in 2025
- State: North Rhine-Westphalia
- Population: 301,800 (2019)
- Electorate: 231,811 (2021)
- Major settlements: Lippstadt; Soest; Werl
- Area: 1,328.6 km^{2}

Current electoral district
- Created: 1980
- Party: CDU
- Member: Oliver Pöpsel
- Elected: 2025

Soest is an electoral constituency (German: Wahlkreis) represented in the Bundestag. It elects one member via first-past-the-post voting. Under the current constituency numbering system, it is designated as constituency 145. It is located in eastern North Rhine-Westphalia, comprising the district of Soest.

Soest was created for the 1980 federal election. From 2017 to 2025, it was represented by Hans-Jürgen Thies of the Christian Democratic Union (CDU). Since 2025 it has been represented by Oliver Pöpsel of the CDU.

== Geography ==
Soest is located in eastern North Rhine-Westphalia. As of the 2021 federal election, it is coterminous with the Soest district.

== History ==
Soest was created in 1980. In the 1980 through 1998 elections, it was constituency 118 in the numbering system. From 2002 through 2009, it was number 147. In the 2013 through 2021 elections, it was number 146. From the 2025 election, it has been number 145. Its borders have not changed since its creation.

== Members ==
The constituency has been held by the Christian Democratic Union (CDU) during all but one Bundestag term since its creation. It was first represented by Hermann Kroll-Schlüter from 1980 to 1990, followed by Jürgen Augustinowitz from 1990 to 1998. Eike Hovermann of the Social Democratic Party (SPD) was elected in 1998. Bernhard Schulte-Drüggelte regained it for the CDU in 2002 and served until 2017. Hans-Jürgen Thies was elected in 2017 and was re-elected in 2021. In 2025 Oliver Pöpsel was elected

Election	Member	Party	%
1980	Hermann Kroll-Schlüter	CDU	50.0
1983	Hermann Kroll-Schlüter	CDU	56.3
1987	Hermann Kroll-Schlüter	CDU	49.8
1990	Jürgen Augustinowitz	CDU	49.4
1994	Jürgen Augustinowitz	CDU	49.6
1998	Eike Hovermann	SPD	45.5
2002	Bernhard Schulte-Drüggelte	CDU	44.2
2005	Bernhard Schulte-Drüggelte	CDU	46.3
2009	Bernhard Schulte-Drüggelte	CDU	45.8
2013	Bernhard Schulte-Drüggelte	CDU	49.8
2017	Hans-Jürgen Thies	CDU	42.7
2021	Hans-Jürgen Thies	CDU	33.1
2025	Oliver Pöpsel	CDU	37.3

== Election results ==
=== 2025 election ===
Federal election (2025): Soest
Notes:	Blue background denotes the winner of the electorate vote. Pink background denotes a candidate elected from their party list. Yellow background denotes an electorate win by a list member, or other incumbent. A ✓ or ✗ denotes status of any incumbent, win or lose respectively.						
Party	Candidate	Votes	%	±%	Party votes	%	±%
CDU	✓ Oliver Pöpsel	70,482	37.3	▲4.2	66,360	35.0	▲6.0
SPD	Jens Behrens	42,543	22.5	▼8.3	34,834	18.4	▼10.3
AfD	Ulrich von Zons	36,667	19.4	▲11.5	35,823	18.9	▲10.9
Greens	Sarah Gonschorek	18,136	9.6	▼2.9	19,040	10.0	▼3.5
Left	Roland Linnhoff	11,204	5.9	▲2.8	11,577	6.1	▲3.0
FDP	Fabian Griewel	7,447	3.9	▼6.1	7,681	4.1	▼7.8
BSW					7,393	3.9	
Tierschutzpartei					2,273	1.2	▼1.0
FW	Christine-Maria Hudyma	2,537	1.3	▲0.2	997	0.5	▼0.1
PARTEI					1,013	0.5	▼0.4
Volt					908	0.5	▲0.3
dieBasis				▼1.4	523	0.3	▼0.9
PdF					352	0.2	▲0.1
Team Todenhöfer					270	0.1	▼0.1
BD					244	0.1	
Values					96	0.1	
MERA25					46	0.0	
MLPD					35	0.0	0.0
Pirates							▼0.4
Gesundheitsforschung							▼0.1
Bündnis C							▼0.1
Humanists							▼0.1
ÖDP							▼0.1
SGP					13	0.0	0.0
Informal votes		1,479			1,030		
Total valid votes		189,016			189,465		
Turnout		190,495	83.0				
CDU hold	Majority	27,939	14.8	▲12.5			

=== 2021 election ===
Federal election (2021): Soest
Notes:	Blue background denotes the winner of the electorate vote. Pink background denotes a candidate elected from their party list. Yellow background denotes an electorate win by a list member, or other incumbent. A ✓ or ✗ denotes status of any incumbent, win or lose respectively.						
Party	Candidate	Votes	%	±%	Party votes	%	±%
CDU	✓ Hans-Jürgen Thies	58,791	33.1	▼9.5	51,697	29.1	▼7.2
SPD	Wolfgang Hellmich	54,614	30.8	▲1.5	51,061	28.7	▲3.8
Greens	Shahabuddin Miah	22,154	12.5	▲7.0	24,089	13.5	▲7.4
FDP	Fabian Griewel	17,826	10.0	▲2.1	21,005	11.8	▼1.6
AfD	Berengar Elsner von Gronow	13,992	7.9	▼1.0	14,206	8.0	▼1.4
Left	Helle Robert	5,548	3.1	▼2.5	5,520	3.1	▼3.7
Tierschutzpartei					2,260	1.3	▲0.6
dieBasis	Wolfgang Sälzer	2,507	1.4		2,038	1.1	
PARTEI					1,724	1.0	▲0.3
FW	Christine-Maria Hudyma	2,017	1.1		1,176	0.7	▲0.4
Pirates					666	0.4	0.0
Team Todenhöfer					495	0.3	
Volt					327	0.2	
LIEBE					251	0.1	
Gesundheitsforschung					246	0.1	0.0
LfK					173	0.1	
Bündnis C					159	0.1	
NPD					156	0.1	▼0.1
Humanists					121	0.1	0.0
ÖDP					118	0.1	0.0
du.					89	0.1	
V-Partei3					89	0.0	▼0.1
PdF					73	0.0	
LKR					34	0.0	
DKP					31	0.0	0.0
SGP					13	0.0	0.0
MLPD					12	0.0	0.0
Informal votes		1,554			1,174		
Total valid votes		177,449			177,829		
Turnout		179,003	77.2	▲2.2			
CDU hold	Majority	4,177	2.3	▼11.0			

=== 2017 election ===
Federal election (2017): Soest
Notes:	Blue background denotes the winner of the electorate vote. Pink background denotes a candidate elected from their party list. Yellow background denotes an electorate win by a list member, or other incumbent. A ✓ or ✗ denotes status of any incumbent, win or lose respectively.						
Party	Candidate	Votes	%	±%	Party votes	%	±%
CDU	Hans-Jürgen Thies	73,595	42.7	▼7.1	62,764	36.3	▼8.5
SPD	Wolfgang Hellmich	50,458	29.3	▼4.1	43,184	25.0	▼5.4
AfD	Berengar Elsner von Gronow	15,311	8.9		16,165	9.3	▲5.9
FDP	Fabian Griewel	13,681	7.9	▲5.6	23,296	13.5	▲8.5
Left	Robert Helle	9,756	5.7	▲0.7	11,702	6.8	▲1.5
Greens	Shahabuddin Miah	9,459	5.5	▼0.5	10,723	6.2	▼0.8
Tierschutzpartei					1,207	0.7	
PARTEI					1,183	0.7	▲0.4
Pirates					634	0.4	▼1.7
FW					387	0.2	▲0.1
NPD					310	0.2	▼0.6
Independent	Jonathan Meier	232	0.1				
AD-DEMOKRATEN					184	0.1	
DiB					183	0.1	
Gesundheitsforschung					176	0.1	
V-Partei³					175	0.1	
BGE					168	0.1	
DM					168	0.1	
Volksabstimmung					159	0.1	▼0.1
ÖDP					149	0.1	0.0
Die Humanisten					78	0.0	
MLPD					40	0.0	0.0
DKP					28	0.0	
SGP					11	0.0	0.0
Informal votes		1,872			1,290		
Total valid votes		172,492			173,074		
Turnout		174,364	75.1	▲2.8			
CDU hold	Majority	23,137	13.4	▼3.1			

=== 2013 election ===
Federal election (2013): Soest
Notes:	Blue background denotes the winner of the electorate vote. Pink background denotes a candidate elected from their party list. Yellow background denotes an electorate win by a list member, or other incumbent. A ✓ or ✗ denotes status of any incumbent, win or lose respectively.						
Party	Candidate	Votes	%	±%	Party votes	%	±%
CDU	✓ Bernhard Schulte-Drüggelte	82,394	49.8	▲4.0	74,380	44.8	▲8.2
SPD	Wolfgang Hellmich	55,127	33.3	▲4.1	50,439	30.4	▲4.9
Greens	Cordula Ungruh	9,868	6.0	▼1.3	11,565	7.0	▼1.7
Left	Michael Bruns	8,267	5.0	▼2.0	8,721	5.2	▼2.4
AfD					5,711	3.4	
Pirates	Sven Sladek	3,996	2.4		3,410	2.1	▲0.5
FDP	Ingo Westermann	3,870	2.3	▼7.2	8,218	4.9	▼12.0
NPD		1,954	1.2	▲0.1	1,321	0.8	0.0
PARTEI					467	0.3	
Volksabstimmung					333	0.2	▲0.1
PRO					330	0.2	
FW					229	0.1	
ÖDP					204	0.1	▲0.1
REP					180	0.1	▼0.1
Nichtwahler					192	0.1	
Party of Reason					101	0.1	
BIG					91	0.1	
RRP					86	0.1	▼0.1
Die Rechte					59	0.0	
PSG					52	0.0	0.0
BüSo					32	0.0	0.0
MLPD					25	0.0	0.0
Informal votes		2,435			1,765		
Total valid votes		165,476			166,146		
Turnout		167,911	72.3	▲1.3			
CDU hold	Majority	27,267	16.5	▼0.1			

=== 2009 election ===
Federal election (2009): Soest
Notes:	Blue background denotes the winner of the electorate vote. Pink background denotes a candidate elected from their party list. Yellow background denotes an electorate win by a list member, or other incumbent. A ✓ or ✗ denotes status of any incumbent, win or lose respectively.						
Party	Candidate	Votes	%	±%	Party votes	%	±%
CDU	✓ Bernhard Schulte-Drüggelte	74,725	45.8	▼0.5	59,805	36.6	▼2.5
SPD	Wolfgang Hellmich	47,583	29.2	▼11.9	41,522	25.4	▼12.1
FDP	Urs Frigger	15,625	9.6	▲4.8	27,675	16.9	▲6.4
Greens	Frank Hilgenkamp	11,924	7.3	▲4.0	14,081	8.6	▲2.8
Left	Michael Bruns	11,432	7.0	▲3.3	12,460	7.6	▲3.2
Pirates					2,612	1.6	
NPD	Harald Röhl	1,800	1.1	▲0.2	1,324	0.8	▲0.1
FAMILIE					1,037	0.6	▲0.2
Tierschutzpartei					922	0.6	▲0.1
RENTNER					652	0.4	
REP					388	0.2	▼0.1
RRP					315	0.2	
Volksabstimmung					149	0.1	0.0
Centre					123	0.1	0.0
DVU					118	0.1	
ÖDP					106	0.1	
BüSo					48	0.0	0.0
PSG					22	0.0	0.0
MLPD					13	0.0	0.0
Informal votes		2,204			1,921		
Total valid votes		163,089			163,372		
Turnout		165,293	61.0	▼7.3			
CDU hold	Majority	27,142	16.6	▲11.4			

=== 2005 election ===
Federal election (2005): Soest
Notes:	Blue background denotes the winner of the electorate vote. Pink background denotes a candidate elected from their party list. Yellow background denotes an electorate win by a list member, or other incumbent. A ✓ or ✗ denotes status of any incumbent, win or lose respectively.						
Party	Candidate	Votes	%	±%	Party votes	%	±%
CDU	✓ Bernhard Schulte-Drüggelte	82,445	46.3	▲2.1	69,766	39.1	▼1.1
SPD	Eike Hovermann	73,123	41.1	▼1.8	66,889	37.5	▼1.1
FDP	Forusan Madjlessi	8,518	4.8	▼2.7	18,826	10.5	▲0.2
Left	Manfred Weretecki	6,536	3.7	▲2.3	7,940	4.4	▲3.4
Greens	Udo Müller	5,946	3.3	▼0.7	10,428	5.8	▼1.4
NPD	Andre Schossow	1,534	0.9		1,282	0.7	▲0.6
Familie					801	0.4	▲0.2
Tierschutzpartei					766	0.4	▲0.1
REP					633	0.4	▼0.5
GRAUEN					530	0.3	▲0.1
PBC					212	0.1	
From Now on... Democracy Through Referendum					161	0.1	
Centre					86	0.0	
Socialist Equality Party					75	0.0	
BüSo					50	0.0	
MLPD					29	0.0	0.0
Informal votes		2,830			2,458		
Total valid votes		178,102			178,474		
Turnout		180,932	78.3	▼2.3			
CDU hold	Majority	9,322	5.2				
