= Marie-Agnes Strack-Zimmermann =

German politician (born 1958)

Marie-Agnes Strack-Zimmermann MdB
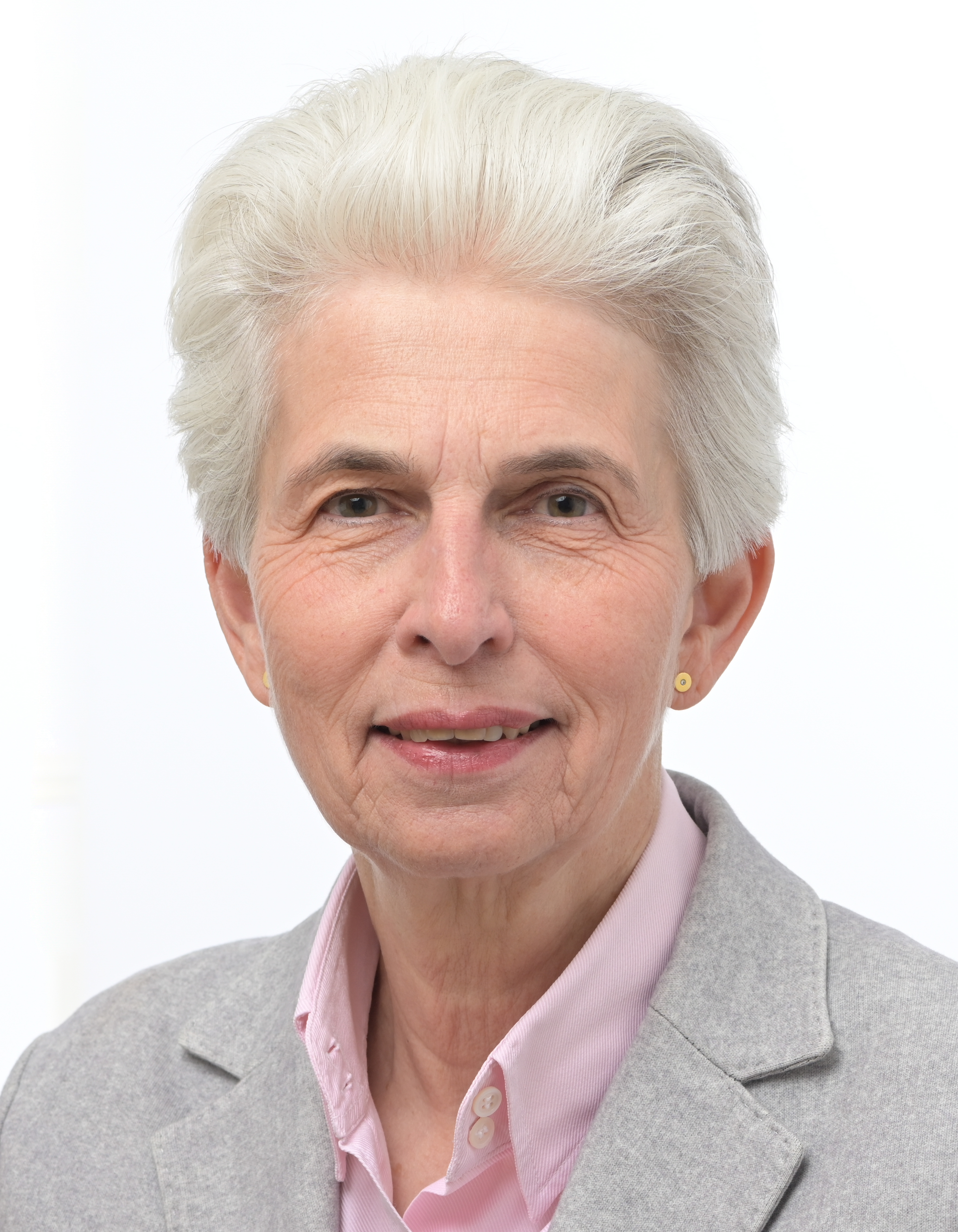
- Official portrait, 2024

Chair of the Committee on Security and Defence of the European Parliament
- Incumbent
- Assumed office 27 January 2025
- Deputy: Christophe Gomart
- Preceded by: Nathalie Loiseau

Member of the European Parliament
- Incumbent
- Assumed office 16 July 2024
- Preceded by: Nicola Beer
- Constituency: Germany

Chair of the Defence Committee
- In office 15 December 2021 – 12 June 2024
- Deputy: Henning Otte
- Preceded by: Wolfgang Hellmich
- Succeeded by: Marcus Faber

Deputy Leader of the Free Democratic Party
- In office 8 December 2013 – 26 April 2019
- Leader: Christian Lindner
- Preceded by: Holger Zastrow
- Succeeded by: Nicola Beer

Member of the Bundestag for North Rhine-Westphalia
- In office 24 October 2017 – 15 July 2024
- Preceded by: multi-member district
- Succeeded by: Fabian Griewel
- Constituency: Free Democratic Party List

Personal details
- Born: Marie-Agnes Jahn; 10 March 1958 (age 68) Düsseldorf, North Rhine-Westphalia, West Germany
- Party: Free Democratic (since 1990)
- Children: 3
- Education: LMU Munich (Dr. phil.)
- Occupation: Politician; Publishing Representative
- Awards: Order of Merit (Ukraine), Third Class
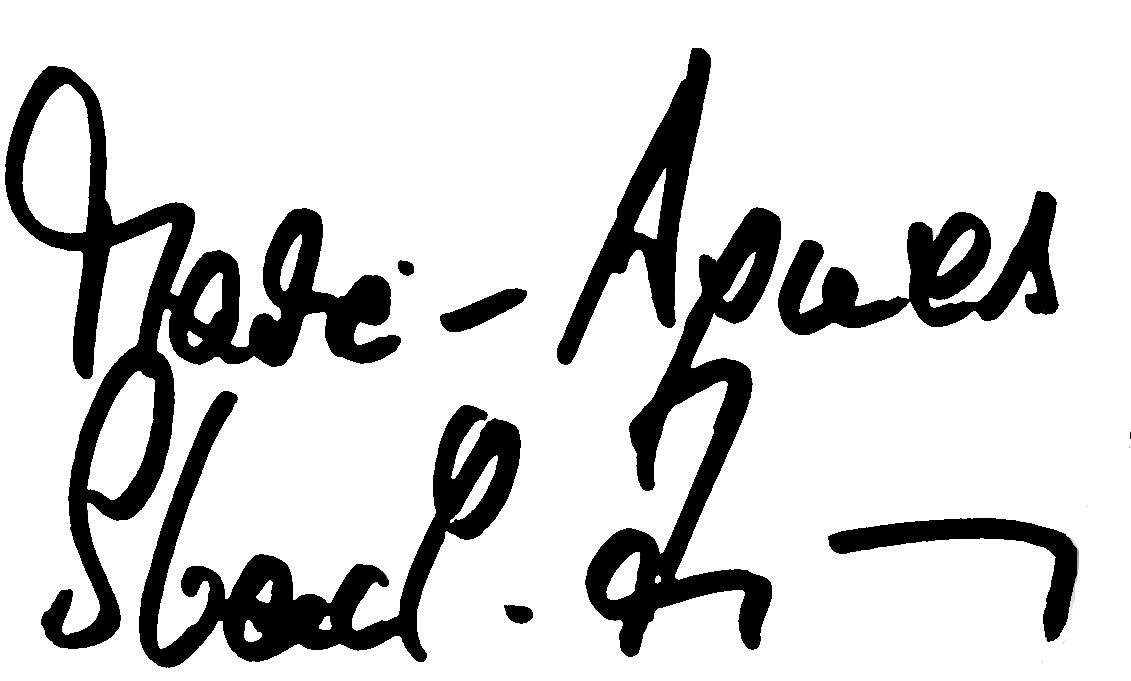
- Signature
- Central institution membership: 2023–present: Guest member, FDP Party Executive Committee Presidium; 2019–present: Full member, FDP Party Executive Committee

Marie-Agnes Strack-Zimmermann (née Jahn; born 10 March 1958) is a German politician of the Free Democratic Party (FDP) who has been serving as a Member of the European Parliament since July 2024.

Before that Strack-Zimmermann served as Member of the German Bundestag from the state of North Rhine-Westphalia from 2017 to 2024. In parliament, she chaired the Defence Committee. From 2008 to 2014, she served as First Mayor of Düsseldorf, thereby acting as deputy to the Lord Mayor.

== Early life and career ==
Strack-Zimmermann was born Marie-Agnes Jahn on 10 March 1958 in Düsseldorf, West Germany, to Wolfgang Jahn (1918–2005), an economist and banking executive, and Maria Gabriele Jahn (née Beck; 1924–2018).

Strack-Zimmermann studied journalism, political science and German language and literature at LMU Munich and graduated with a Master of Arts degree. In 1986, she received her doctorate at LMU with a thesis entitled Bilder aus Amerika: eine zeitungswissenschaftliche Studie über die USA-Berichterstattung im Zweiten Deutschen Fernsehen (ZDF) (transl. Images from America: a newspaper science study on US reporting on ZDF).

From 1988 to 2008, Strack-Zimmermann worked for the Nuremberg youth book publisher Tessloff. She was later a freelance publishing house representative.

== Political career ==
=== Career in local politics ===
Strack-Zimmermann was a member of the Düsseldorf city council from 2004 to 2023. From 2008 until 2014, she served as deputy mayor of Düsseldorf, alongside mayor Dirk Elbers.

=== Deputy Chair of the FDP, 2013–2019 ===
Following the election of Christian Lindner as chairman of the FDP in 2013, Strack-Zimmermann became one of his deputies. She served as part of the party's leadership until 2019, when she was succeeded by Nicola Beer.

=== Member of the German Parliament, 2017–2024 ===
Strack-Zimmermann became a member of the Bundestag in the 2017 German federal election.

During her first term from 2017 to 2021, Strack-Zimmermann served on the Defence Committee and the Committee for Construction, Housing, Urban Development and Local Authorities. During that time, she was her parliamentary group's spokesperson for defence policy and spokesperson for local government policy. Since 2021, Strack-Zimmermann has been serving as chairwoman of the Defence Committee.

In addition to her committee assignments, Strack-Zimmermann has been a member of the German delegation to the NATO Parliamentary Assembly since 2018, where she is part of the Defence and Security Committee, the Political Committee, the Sub-Committee on Transatlantic Defence and Security Cooperation and the Sub-Committee on Transatlantic Relations.

In the negotiations to form a so-called traffic light coalition of the Social Democratic Party (SPD), the Green Party and the FDP following the 2021 federal elections, Strack-Zimmermann was part of her party's delegation in the working group on foreign policy, defence, development cooperation and human rights, co-chaired by Heiko Maas, Omid Nouripour and Alexander Graf Lambsdorff.

In her capacity as chair of the defense committee, Strack-Zimmermann visited Ukraine shortly after the 2022 Russian invasion with Michael Roth and Anton Hofreiter, the chairs of the Bundestag's foreign relations and European affairs committees respectively.

In 2023, Strack-Zimmermann was one of the initiators – alongside Michelle Müntefering and Agnieszka Brugger – of a cross-party group promoting a feminist foreign policy.

=== Member of the European Parliament, 2024–present ===
In March 2024, Strack-Zimmermann was nominated by the FDP to become the Alliance of Liberals and Democrats for Europe Party's lead candidate for the 2024 European Parliament election. She was elected, and her seat in the German Bundestag was taken up by Fabian Griewel.

In parliament, Strack-Zimmermann has since been chairing the Subcommittee on Security and Defence. She is also a member of the Committee on Foreign Affairs. In addition to her committee assignments, she is part of the parliament’s delegations to the NATO Parliamentary Assembly and to the EU-Chile Joint Parliamentary Committee.

In 2026, Strack-Zimmermann announced her intention to challenge Christian Dürr as leader of the FDP at the next party convention; shortly after, she withdrew her candidacy and instead endorsed Henning Höne. When Höne also withdrew from consideration, she eventually became a candidate again but was defeated by Wolfgang Kubicki at a party convention, having secured roughly 40 percent of the vote.

== Other activities ==
- Federal Academy for Security Policy (BAKS), Member of the advisory board (since 2018)
- Förderkreis Deutsches Heer, Committee Member
- Deutsche Gesellschaft für Wehrtechnik, Committee Member
- FOM University of Applied Sciences Düsseldorf, Member of the Board of Trustees
- Rotary International, Member
- Fortuna Düsseldorf, Member
