= Jens Behrens =

German politician (born 1978)

Jens Behrens (born 1978 in Erwitte) is a German politician of the Social Democratic Party, who was elected to the 21st Bundestag in the 2025 Bundestag election on 23 February. Previously, he was active in local politics in and around Lippstadt.

== Life ==
Jens Behrens was born on 12 June 1978 in Erwitte, where he graduated in 1998. After a year in the German Armed Forces (Military Service), he completed an apprenticeship at the Sparkasse of Lippstadt, which was followed by numerous further training courses. Since 2013 he has been the manager of this branch.

== Political career ==
Behrens joined the SPD in 2013 and was deputy chairman of the local association of the SPD Overhagen (village in Lippstadt) from 2014. From 2014 to 2020, he was also the mayor of the district. In 2016, Behrens became chairman of the city association of the SPD Lippstadt and was elected to the city council two years later, where he was parliamentary group chairman for several years. Since 2022, he has been head of the Soest district association.

In the 2025 Bundestag election, Behrens ran to succeed Wolfgang Hellmich in the Bundestag constituency of Soest, where he received 42,543 votes (22.5%) and was clearly defeated by Oliver Pöpsel of the CDU who received 70,482 votes (37.3%), respectively. After initial uncertainties, he was able to enter the Bundestag by being placed 19th on his party's state list.

His political priorities include infrastructure and the economy.

== Memberships ==
Behrens is a member of ver.di and is the managing director of the Bürgerring Overhagen.

== Private Life ==
Behrens is married and has two sons.
