= Leader of the Free Democratic Party (Germany) =

Most senior politician of the Christian Democratic Union of Germany

Chairman of the Free Democratic Party
- Vorsitzender der Freien Demokratischen Partei

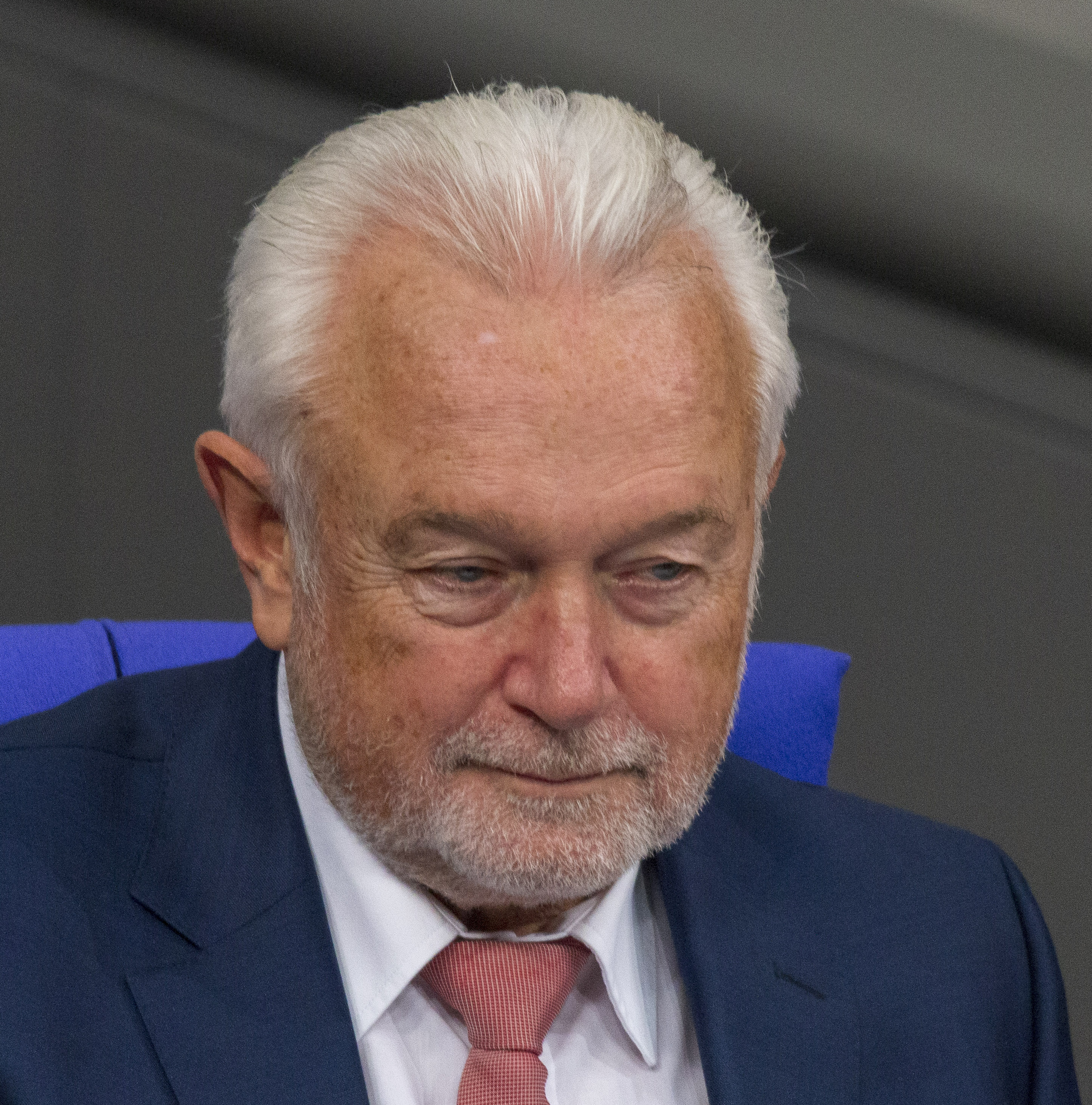
- Incumbent; Wolfgang Kubicki since 30 May 2026
- Type: Chairman of a party
- Member of: Federal Executive Presidium
- Formation: 12 December 1948
- First holder: Theodor Heuss
- Deputy: Deputy Chairperson: Henning Höne; Svenja Hahn; Linda Teuteberg

The Chairman of the Free Democratic Party (German: Vorsitzender der Freien Demokratischen Partei) is the most senior and leading political figure within the Free Democratic Party (FDP), a centre-right and liberal political party in Germany with parliamentary representation. The Free Democratic Party (FDP) is, historically, also one of the most significant political parties in Germany. From 6 December 2013 to 23 February 2025, the office was held by Christian Lindner, who succeeded Philipp Rösler.

The Leader of the Free Democratic Party is supported by a General Secretary who, from December 2024 to February 2025, was Marco Buschmann.

== List ==
Chairmen of the Free Democratic Party

| Portrait | Name (Born–Died) | Term of office | | | Faction | State | Chancellor |
| Portrait | Name (Born–Died) | Took office | Left office | Days | Faction | State | Chancellor |
|---|---|---|---|---|---|---|---|
| 1 | Theodor Heuss (1884–1963) | 12 December 1948 | 12 September 1949 | 274 days | Social liberal faction | Baden-Württemberg | None; Konrad Adenauer |
| 2 | Franz Blücher (1896–1959) | 12 September 1949 | 6 March 1954 | 4 years, 175 days | None | North Rhine-Westphalia | Konrad Adenauer |
| 3 | Thomas Dehler (1897–1967) | 6 March 1954 | 26 January 1957 | 2 years, 326 days | Determined liberal faction | Bavaria | Konrad Adenauer |
| 4 | Reinhold Maier (1889–1971) | 26 January 1957 | 28 January 1960 | 3 years, 2 days | Determined liberal faction | Baden-Württemberg | Konrad Adenauer |
| 5 | Erich Mende (1916–1998) | 28 January 1960 | 30 January 1968 | 8 years, 2 days | National liberal faction | North Rhine-Westphalia | Konrad Adenauer; Ludwig Erhard; Kurt Georg Kiesinger |
| 6 | Walter Scheel (1919–2016) | 30 January 1968 | 1 October 1974 | 6 years, 244 days | Social liberal and eco-liberal faction | North Rhine-Westphalia | Kurt Georg Kiesinger; Willy Brandt; Himself (acting); Helmut Schmidt |
| 7 | Hans-Dietrich Genscher (1927–2016) | 1 October 1974 | 23 February 1985 | 10 years, 145 days | Compromise classical liberal faction | North Rhine-Westphalia | Helmut Schmidt; Helmut Kohl |
| 8 | Martin Bangemann (1934–2022) | 23 February 1985 | 8 October 1988 | 3 years, 228 days | None (Social liberal faction) | Baden-Württemberg | Helmut Kohl |
| 9 | Otto Graf Lambsdorff (1926–2009) | 8 October 1988 | 11 June 1993 | 4 years, 246 days | Market liberal and Ordoliberal faction | North Rhine-Westphalia | Helmut Kohl |
| 10 | Klaus Kinkel (1936–2019) | 11 June 1993 | 10 June 1995 | 1 year, 364 days | None (Affiliated with the Compromise classical liberal faction) | Baden-Württemberg | Helmut Kohl |
| 11 | Wolfgang Gerhardt (1943–2024) | 10 June 1995 | 4 May 2001 | 5 years, 328 days | Economic liberal and Social market economy faction | Hesse | Helmut Kohl; Gerhard Schröder |
| 12 | Guido Westerwelle (1961–2016) | 4 May 2001 | 13 May 2011 | 10 years, 9 days | Neoliberal and Anti-Ordoliberal faction (early) Social market economy faction (later) | North Rhine-Westphalia | Gerhard Schröder; Angela Merkel |
| 13 | Philipp Rösler (born 1973) | 13 May 2011 | 7 December 2013 | 2 years, 208 days | None | Lower Saxony | Angela Merkel |
| 14 | Christian Lindner (born 1979) | 7 December 2013 | 16 May 2025 | 11 years, 160 days | None | North Rhine-Westphalia | Angela Merkel; Olaf Scholz; Friedrich Merz |
| 15 | Christian Dürr (born 1977) | 16 May 2025 | 30 May 2026 | 1 year, 14 days | None | Lower Saxony | Friedrich Merz |
| 16 | Wolfgang Kubicki (born 1952) | 30 May 2026 | Incumbent | 100 days | None | Schleswig-Holstein | Friedrich Merz |
