= Wolfgang Kubicki =

German politician (born 1952)

- Kubicki in 2026

Leader of the Free Democratic Party
- Incumbent
- Assumed office 30 May 2026
- Deputy: Henning Höne; Svenja Hahn; Linda Teuteberg
- Preceded by: Christian Dürr

Vice President of the Bundestag (on proposal of the FDP group)
- In office 24 October 2017 – 25 March 2025
- Preceded by: Hermann Otto Solms (2013)
- Succeeded by: Position abolished

First Deputy Leader of the Free Democratic Party
- In office 7 December 2013 – 30 May 2026
- Leader: Christian Lindner; Christian Dürr
- Preceded by: Christian Lindner
- Succeeded by: Henning Höne

Leader of the Free Democratic Party in the Landtag of Schleswig-Holstein
- In office 23 April 1996 – 14 December 2017
- Preceded by: Ekkehard Klug
- Succeeded by: Christopher Vogt
- In office 5 May 1992 – 16 August 1993
- Preceded by: Wolf-Dieter Zumpfort (1988)
- Succeeded by: Ekkehard Klug

Leader of the Free Democratic Party in Schleswig-Holstein
- In office September 1989 – September 1993
- Preceded by: Jens Ruge
- Succeeded by: Jürgen Koppelin

Member of the Bundestag for Schleswig-Holstein
- In office 24 October 2017 – 25 March 2025
- Preceded by: Multi-member district
- Constituency: Free Democratic Party List
- In office 17 October 2002 – 9 December 2002
- Preceded by: Multi-member district
- Succeeded by: Christel Happach-Kasan
- Constituency: Free Democratic Party List
- In office 20 December 1990 – 2 August 1992
- Preceded by: Multi-member district
- Succeeded by: Michaela Blunk
- Constituency: Free Democratic Party List

Member of the Landtag of Schleswig-Holstein
- In office 5 May 1992 – 14 December 2017
- Preceded by: Multi-member district
- Succeeded by: Jörg Hansen

Personal details
- Born: 3 March 1952 (age 74) Braunschweig, Lower Saxony, West Germany
- Party: Free Democratic
- Education: University of Kiel

Wolfgang Joachim Kubicki (German: [kuˈbɪki] koo-BIK-ee) (born 3 March 1952) is a German politician of the Free Democratic Party of Germany (FDP) who has been chairman of the FDP since 2026.

Kubicki was a member of the Bundestag from 1990 to 1992 and again from 2017 to 2025. He served as Vice President of the Bundestag from 2017 to 2025. From 1992 to 1993 and from 1996 to 2017 he served as chairman of the FDP group in the Schleswig-Holstein state parliament. From 2013 to 2026 he has been vice chairman of the FDP.

== Early life and education ==
Kubicki was born in Braunschweig as the youngest of four children. His parents were clerks, who had moved from Oebisfelde, Saxony-Anhalt, shortly before his birth. His father was a Luftwaffe pilot during World War II. Kubicki was raised Evangelical.

After graduating from Hoffmann-von-Fallersleben-Schule Braunschweig in 1970, Kubicki studied economics at the University of Kiel, where Peer Steinbrück was among his fellow students. He graduated in 1975. After that he worked for a consulting company and from 1978 in a Steuerberater ("tax advisor") office. From 1981 to 1983 he worked as a researcher for the FDP in the Schleswig-Holstein Landtag. He finished a second degree in law, completed while working, at the University of Kiel in 1982 with the first state examination. In 1985 he completed the second state examination and has worked as a criminal defense lawyer for tax law.

== Political career ==
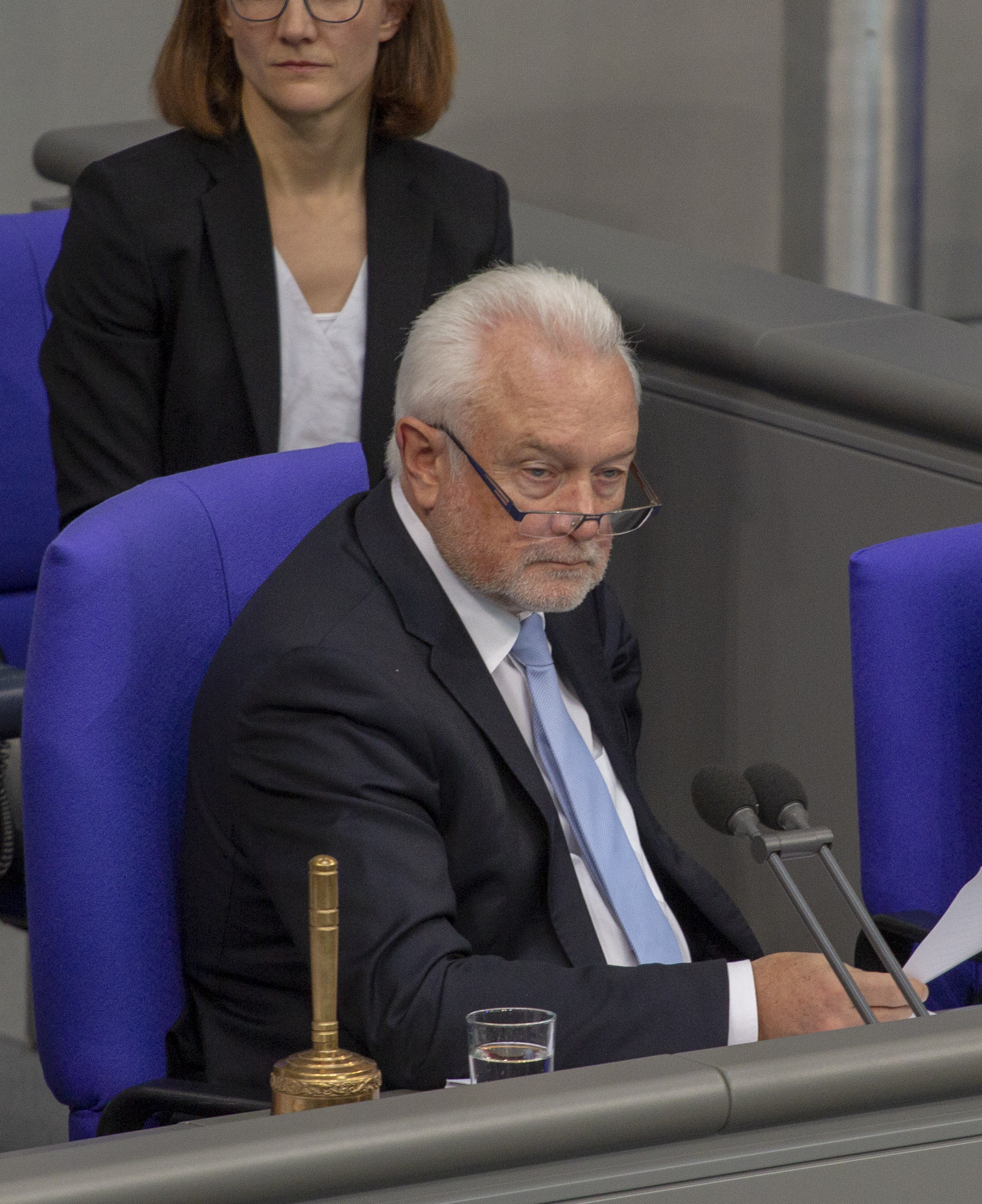
Kubicki in 2019

Kubicki joined the FDP in 1971. In 1972/73 he was deputy federal chairman of the Liberal University Association and in 1975/76 state chairman of the Young Democrats in Schleswig-Holstein. Subsequently, Kubicki was first elected to the state executive committee of the Schleswig-Holstein FDP in 1976, where he served until 1988, most recently as deputy state chairman.

From 1987 to 1989, he was chairman of the Rendsburg-Eckernförde FDP district association. He relinquished this office after his election as state chairman in September 1989. In September 1993, Kubicki resigned as state chairman in the wake of the Schönberg Landfill Affair. As state chairman, Kubicki was also a member of the Liberals' federal executive committee. He has done so again since 1997. He was also his party's top candidate in state elections in Schleswig-Holstein in 1992, 2000, 2005, 2009, 2012 and 2017.

Kubicki lobbied since 2000 for Guido Westerwelle to be elected federal chairman of the FDP and to become parliamentary party leader of the FDP parliamentary group in the Bundestag. Westerwelle thus pushed Wolfgang Gerhardt out of both positions at the time. In mid-December 2010, Kubicki publicly advocated for Westerwelle's replacement as party leader of the FDP in May 2011. He compared the situation of the FDP with the late phase of the GDR and blamed the party leadership for the poll results below 5%. He said that the FDP was not in a good position to be replaced.

In the 2012 state election, the FDP, with Kubicki as its top candidate, received a result of 8.2 percent of the second votes. While this was a significant loss compared to the 2009 state election, when 14.9 percent was achieved, it was still the second-best election result achieved in Schleswig-Holstein. Previously, the FDP had been eliminated from six state parliaments. Therefore, the result was considered an extraordinary success, which was mainly attributed to Kubicki and labeled the "Kubicki effect". In polls, he achieved 54 percent approval of the electorate of Schleswig-Holstein (compared to 18 percent for Philipp Rösler) and 63 percent saw large differences between the state and federal FDP. Although Kubicki had never been sparing with criticism of his own party's federal policies, he already emphasized in the ZDF election broadcast that this result, which was perceived as an election victory, was precisely also a success for the federal party. In doing so, he clearly countered putsch rumors against the chairman of the federal FDP Philipp Rösler that had previously arisen in public even before the end of the election evening. In August 2012, Kubicki announced his intention to run as the top candidate for the Schleswig-Holstein FDP in the 2013 federal election.

At the 2013 FDP federal party convention, Kubicki succeeded then-Development Minister Dirk Niebel, who was eliminated in the first round of voting, as an assessor on the federal presidium. Kubicki then won in a fight vote against Health Minister Daniel Bahr. The Extraordinary Party Congress of the FDP in December 2013 elected Kubicki as 1st Deputy to the new party leader Christian Lindner with 89.87% of the vote. The 2015 FDP Federal Party Congress confirmed Kubicki in this position with 94.2% of the vote, and the 2017 FDP Federal Party Congress with 92.29%.

Kubicki is a member of the FDP's Executive Committee.

Kubicki is a member of the advisory board of the German-Arab Society.

== Political positions ==
=== Dealings with Russia ===
In May 2018, Kubicki failed with his demand at the FDP party congress to ease economic sanctions against Russia. After the poisoning of Alexei Navalny, Kubicki proposed an import ban on Russian gas. He supported the FDP parliamentary group's proposal for a moratorium on the construction of the Nord Stream 2 gas pipeline.

In March 2024, Kubicki declared that he would vote in favor of the delivery of Taurus KEPD 350 cruise missiles to Ukraine.

=== Chemnitz protests ===
In August 2018, Kubicki commented on the Chemnitz protests blaming Merkel's migration policy for the roots of the riots. This position resulted in criticism by fellow party members including Marie-Agnes Strack-Zimmermann and Ria Schröder. However, he said, this is not an explanation for agitation, racism and violence. However, other party members such as Christian Lindner and Nicola Beer defended Kubicki, who later wrote in a statement on social media that citizens "have the feeling that the state is allowing itself to be paraded - by the right and the left. Shouting 'Germany sucks' and throwing paving stones at police officers is at least as condemnable as right-wing agitation against alleged migrants."

=== Election of Thomas Kemmerich ===
On 5 February 2020, Kubicki defended the election of Thomas Kemmerich (FDP) as Thuringia's prime minister with the votes of the FDP, AfD and CDU. The vote of Kemmerich with help of the AfD was rejected by other parties and resulted in the Thuringian government crisis.

=== COVID-19 pandemic ===
On 28 April 2020, Kubicki criticised the Robert Koch Institute (RKI) and its president Lothar Wieler and accused the published figures of being rather politically motivated than scientifically based, as according to Kubicki the suggested implementations of restrictions falling numbers. Furthermore, Kubicki criticized the federal government and the Federal Ministry of Health under Jens Spahn for poor management of vaccine procurement, the introduction of the Corona-Warn-App, as well as for imposing curfews as a mean of dealing with the virus. In June 2021, Kubicki called for the repeal of all measures which restricting fundamental rights according to him because the legal basis had lapsed due to persistent 7-day incidences below 35.

Kubicki has publicly declared that he has violated against the lockdowns set by the federal government himself.

In November 2021, Kubicki called the chairman of the World Medical Association, Frank Ulrich Montgomery the "Saddam Hussein of the medical profession." Montgomery had previously sharply criticized the FDP's Corona policy. After strong criticism, Kubicki apologized to Montgomery. In the speech in which he attacked Montgomery, he also criticized Corona management in parts of southern Germany. He also claimed that Markus Söder was putting his own career ambitions ahead of protecting the public, calling Söders regulations to be out of character and "humanly pathetic."

In December 2021, he positioned himself against general mandatory vaccination against COVID-19 and formulated a motion against it with other FDP deputies. Kubicki sees the general vaccination requirement as unconstitutional and called it a serious breach of trust. In addition, he stated that many supporters of compulsory vaccination seemed to be primarily concerned with revenge and retaliation against the unvaccinated. As a result, he was also criticized within the party.

In early 2022, Kubicki called on Bavarian Minister President Markus Söder to resign, accusing him of misleading the public regarding the role of the unvaccinated in the infection process. Söder had previously spoken of a "pandemic of the unvaccinated" and in mid-November 2021 had referred to figures according to which the incidence among vaccinated persons was 110, but that among unvaccinated persons was 1469. It later became known that this calculation added people with unknown vaccination status to the unvaccinated group, potentially overestimating the role of the unvaccinated.

== Schönberg landfill affair ==
The Schönberg landfill (now Ihlenberg landfill) in Mecklenburg-Vorpommern was created from the former "VEB Landfill Schönberg". In 1991, Kubicki began advising the state of Mecklenburg-Vorpommern on its privatization for a fee of DM 850,000. He was soon accused of giving the state bad advice and charging excessive fees. Above all, the state-owned operating company had been left to bear the risks and environmental obligations and had almost been driven into insolvency, while one of Kubicki's business partners, the Lübeck waste contractor Adolf Hilmer, had "skimmed off 52 million marks in profit in the first three years alone" as a tenant.

However, Kubicki is said to have concealed his contact with Hilmer. At the beginning of 1993, the State Audit Office of Mecklenburg-Vorpommern criticized the "miserable conduct of negotiations" by the Mecklenburg Ministry of the Environment and estimated that the state had suffered damages of 100 million marks as a result of "gagging contracts." The Mecklenburg-Vorpommern state parliament convened a committee of inquiry to clarify the allegations and later sued Kubicki for damages. Kubicki resigned from the chairmanship of the FDP and the parliamentary group in Kiel in 1993. However, the Federal Court of Justice ruled in Kubicki's favor in the legal dispute, which had lasted for years.

== Other activities ==
=== Corporate boards ===
- Intensatec Group, Member of the International Advisory Board
- HSH Nordbank, Member of the Advisory Board (2003-2005)

== Personal life ==
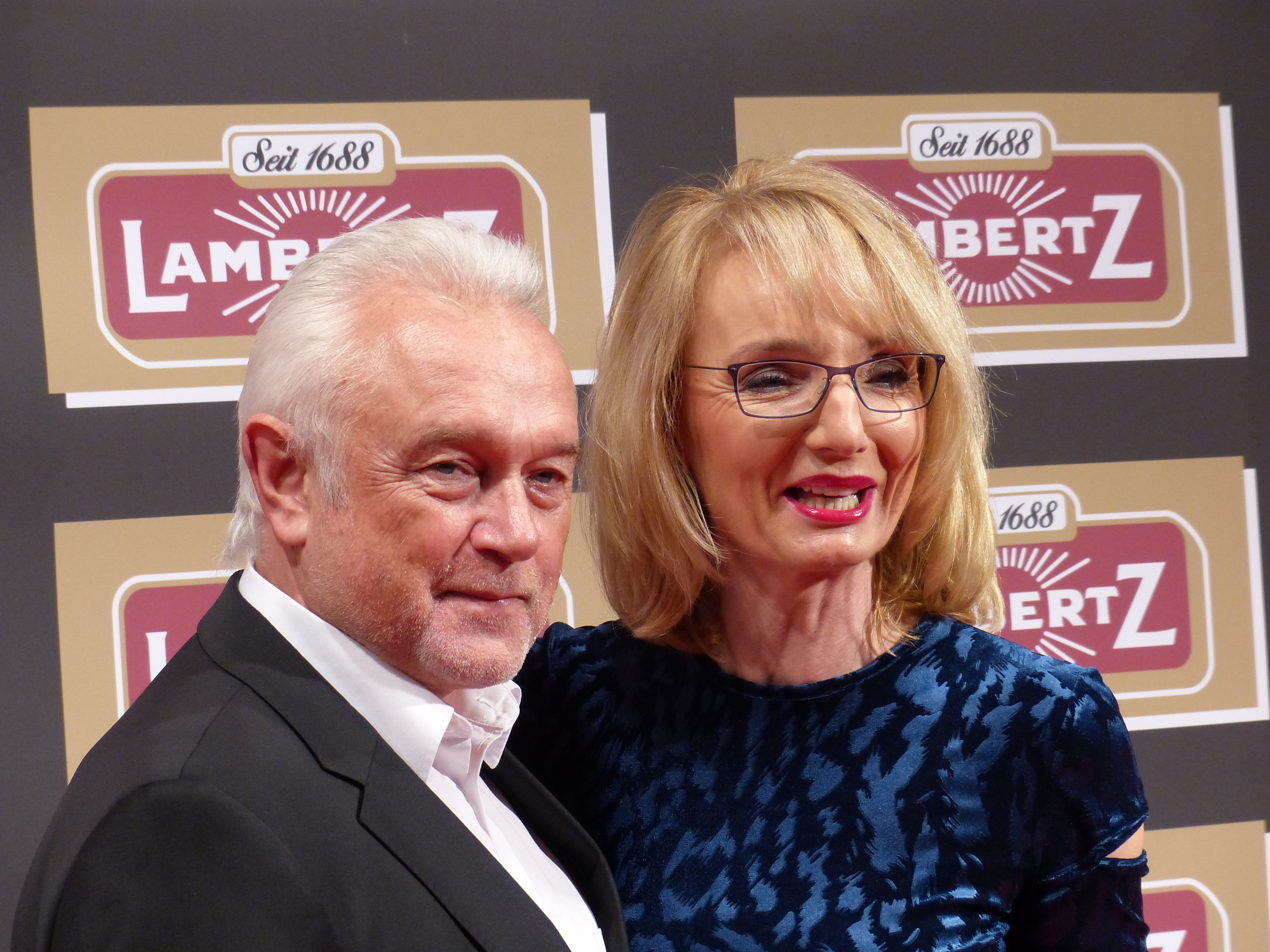
Kubicki with his wife in 2016

Kubicki formerly served as a bible teacher for the YMCA. He was a member of a church council for four years before leaving the parish due to doctrinal differences.

Kubicki married his third wife, attorney Annette Marberth-Kubicki, in 1997. They live in Strande and maintain a holiday residence in Santa Ponsa. Kubicki has twin daughters from his second marriage.

Party political offices
Preceded by Jens Ruge	Leader of the Free Democratic Party in Schleswig-Holstein; 1989–1993	Succeeded by Jürgen Koppelin
Preceded by Wolf-Dieter Zumpfort	Leader of the Free Democratic Party in the Landtag of Schleswig-Holstein; 1992–1993	Succeeded by Ekkehard Klug
Preceded by Ekkehard Klug	Leader of the Free Democratic Party in the Landtag of Schleswig-Holstein; 1996–present	Incumbent
