= Oliver Pöpsel =

German politician (born 1973)

Member of the Bundestag
- Assuming office 25 March 2025
- Succeeding: Hans-Jürgen Thies
- Constituency: Soest

Personal details
- Born: 6 April 1973 (age 53)
- Party: Christian Democratic Union

Oliver Reinhold Pöpsel (born 6 April 1973) is a German politician who was elected as a member of the Bundestag in 2025. He has served as deputy district administrator of Soest since 2020.
