= Fabian Griewel =

German politician (born 1997)

Member of the Bundestag
- In office 16 July 2024 – 2025
- Preceded by: Marie-Agnes Strack-Zimmermann

Personal details
- Born: 2 February 1997 (age 29) Lippstadt, Germany
- Party: FDP
- Education: Ruhr University Bochum

Fabian Griewel (born 2 February 1997) is a German politician from the Free Democratic Party who served as a member of the German Bundestag from July 2024 to 2025.

== Life ==
Griewel grew up in Welver. After graduating from high school, he studied geography and history at the Ruhr University Bochum from 2016 to 2019. He graduated with a Bachelor of Arts. He then studied geography, history and educational sciences, also at the University of Bochum; he graduated with a Master of Education in 2021. During his studies, he was a scholarship holder of the Friedrich Naumann Foundation.

Professionally, Griewel worked for Deutsche Post and as an employee of members of parliament in the Landtag of North Rhine-Westphalia and the European Parliament. From 2022 until his entry into the Bundestag in 2024, he worked as a manager for public affairs at the multimedia company Axel Springer SE.

Griewel lives in Soest and works as a football referee.

== Political career ==
Griewel has been a member of the FDP since 2015. From 2015 to 2019, he held various positions on the federal executive board and the North Rhine-Westphalia state executive board of the Young Liberals.

In the 2020 North Rhine-Westphalia local elections, he was elected to the district council of the Soest district. He was chairman of the FDP parliamentary group there.

Griewel ran for the Bundestag in the 2017 and 2021 federal elections in the Soest constituency, but initially failed to be elected to the Bundestag in each case. He replaced Marie-Agnes Strack-Zimmermann in the Bundestag on 16 July 2024.
