= Alliance of Liberals and Democrats for Europe Party =

Liberal European political party

- Abbreviation: ALDE Party
- President: Svenja Hahn (DE)
- Secretary-General: Didrik de Schaetzen (BE)
- Founded: 26 March 1976; 50 years ago
- Headquarters: Rue d'Idalie 11 – box 2, 1050 Brussels, Belgium
- Think tank: European Liberal Forum
- Youth wing: European Liberal Youth
- Membership (22 December 2025): 3
- Ideology: Liberalism; Pro-Europeanism
- Political position: Centre to centre-right
- European Parliament group: Renew (2019–present); ALDE Group (2004–2019); ELDR Group (1976–2004)
- International affiliation: Liberal International
- Colours: Blue; Magenta; Yellow (customary)
- European Parliament: 55 / 720
- European Commission: 5 / 27
- European Council: 3 / 27
- EU lower/unicameral houses: 474 / 6,217
- EU upper houses: 113 / 1,459

Website
- aldeparty.eu

The Alliance of Liberals and Democrats for Europe Party (ALDE Party) is a liberal European political party composed of national parties from across Europe, mainly active in the European Union. The ALDE Party is affiliated with Liberal International and a recognised European political party, incorporated as a non-profit association under Belgian law.

It was founded on 26 March 1976 in Stuttgart, Germany as a confederation of national political parties under the name "Federation of Liberal and Democrat Parties in Europe" and renamed "European Liberals and Democrats" (ELD) in 1977 and "European Liberal Democrats and Reformists" (ELDR) in 1986. On 30 April 2004, the ELDR was reformed as an official European party, the "European Liberal Democrat and Reform Party" (ELDR Party).

On 10 November 2012, under the leadership of Graham Watson MEP, the party chose its current name ALDE Party, taken from its then-European Parliament group, the Alliance of Liberals and Democrats for Europe (ALDE), which had been formed on 20 July 2004 in conjunction with the European Democratic Party (EDP). Prior to the 2004 European election, the European party had been represented through its own group, the European Liberal Democrat and Reform Party Group (ELDR) Group. In June 2019, the ALDE group was succeeded by Renew Europe.

As of 2026, the ALDE Party is represented in European Union institutions, with 51 MEPs and five members of the European Commission. Of the 27 EU member states, there are three with ALDE-affiliated Prime Ministers: Kristen Michal (Estonian Reform Party) in Estonia, Rob Jetten in the Netherlands and Micheál Martin in Ireland. ALDE Party members are also in governments in ten other EU member states: Cyprus, France, Denmark, Finland, Sweden, Ireland, Luxembourg, Lithuania, Germany and the Netherlands. Charles Michel, former Belgian prime minister, was the president of the European Council until December 2024.

ALDE's think tank is the European Liberal Forum, led by Jan-Christoph Oetjen MEP, and gathers 46 member organisations. The youth wing of ALDE is the European Liberal Youth (LYMEC), which is predominantly based upon youth and student liberal organisations but contains also a small number of individual members. LYMEC is led by Marten Porte.

In 2011, ALDE Party became the first European political party to create the status of individual membership. Since then, between 1000 and close to 3000 members (the numbers fluctuate annually) maintained direct membership in the ALDE Party from several EU countries. Over 40 coordinators mobilised liberal ideas, initiatives and expertise across the continent under the leadership of the steering committee, which was first chaired by Julie Cantalou. ALDE later took a step further when granting voting rights to individual members' delegates at the Party Congress. Individual membership was eventually discontinued in 2023.

In 2025, the Alliance was declared an undesirable organisation in Russia.

== Structure ==
=== Bureau ===
The day-to-day management of the ALDE Party is handled by the Bureau, the members of which are:

Office	Name	State member	Party member
President	Svenja Hahn MEP	Germany	FDP
Vice-presidents
Vice-presidents	Yoko Alender	Estonia	Reform
Vice-presidents	Malik Azmani MEP	Netherlands	VVD
Vice-presidents	Dan Barna MEP	Romania	USR
Vice-presidents	Sal Brinton	United Kingdom	Lib Dem
Vice-presidents	Rik Daems	Belgium	Open VLD
Vice-presidents	Eva Kjer Hansen	Denmark	Venstre
Vice-presidents	Yevheniia Kravchuk MP	Ukraine	Servant of the People
Vice-presidents	Jouni Ovaska MP	Finland	Keskusta
Vice-presidents	Lucia Plaváková MP	Slovakia	Progressive Slovakia
Treasurer	David Burke	Ireland	FF

Ex officio members
Office	Name	State member	Party member
ALDE Party Secretary-General	Didrik de Schaetzen	Belgium	MR- Open VLD – DP
President of Liberal International	Karl-Heinz Paqué	Germany	FDP
ALDE Group Chair in the PACE	Iulian Bulai	Romania	USR
President of the Renew Europe Group in the European Parliament	Valérie Hayer MEP	France	Renaissance
Leader of the Renew Europe Group in the European Committee of the Regions	François Decoster	France	Renaissance
President of the European Liberal Forum	Jan-Christoph Oetjen	Germany	FDP
President of the European Liberal Youth	Ines Holzegger	Austria	NEOS

== Presidents ==
Period	President
1978–1981	(Luxembourg) Gaston Thorn
1981–1985	(Belgium) Willy De Clercq
1985–1990	(Luxembourg) Colette Flesch
1990–1995	(Belgium) Willy De Clercq
1995–2000	(Denmark) Uffe Ellemann-Jensen
2000–2005	(Germany) Werner Hoyer
2005–2011	(Belgium) Annemie Neyts-Uyttebroeck
2011–2015	(United Kingdom) Graham Watson
2015–2021	(Netherlands) Hans van Baalen
2021–2024	(Republic of Ireland) Timmy Dooley; (Bulgaria) Ilhan Kyuchyuk
2024–present	(Germany) Svenja Hahn

== History of pan-European liberalism ==
ELDR Party logo (2009–2012)

Pan-European liberalism has a long history dating back to the foundation of Liberal International in April 1947. On 26 March 1976, the Federation of Liberal and Democrat Parties in Europe was established in Stuttgart. The founding parties of the federation were the Free Democratic Party of Germany, Radical Party of France, Venstre of Denmark, Italian Liberal Party, Dutch People's Party for Freedom and Democracy and Democratic Party of Luxembourg. Observer members joining later in 1976 were the Danish Social Liberal Party, French Radical Party of the Left and Independent Republicans, British Liberal Party, and Italian Republican Party. In 1977, the federation was renamed European Liberals and Democrats, in 1986, European Liberal Democrats and Reformists.

It evolved into the European Liberal Democrat and Reform Party (ELDR Party) in 2004, when it was founded as an official European party under that name and incorporated under Belgian law at an extraordinary Congress in Brussels, held on 30 April 2004 the day before the enlargement of the European Union. At the same time the matching group in the European Parliament, the European Liberal Democrats and Reformists Group allied with the members of the newly elected European Democratic Party, forming the Alliance of Liberals and Democrats for Europe (ALDE) with a matching ALDE Group in the European Parliament.

On 10 November 2012, the ELDR Party adopted the name of the alliance between the two parties, to match the parliamentary group and the alliance.

On 12 June 2019, the ALDE group was succeeded by a new enlarged group, Renew Europe, which primarily consists of ALDE and EDP member parties and France's La République En Marche! (LREM).

== Funding ==
As a registered European political party, ALDE is entitled to European public funding, which it has received continuously since 2004.

Below is the evolution of European public funding received by ALDE.

In line with the Regulation on European political parties and European political foundations, ALDE also raises private funds to co-finance its activities. As of 2025, European parties must raise at least 10% of their reimbursable expenditure from private sources, while the rest can be covered using European public funding. (Note: For the purpose of European party funding, "contributions" refer to financial or in-kind support provided by party members, while "donations" refer to the same but provided by non-members.)

Below is the evolution of contributions and donations received by the ALDE.

== European Commissioners ==
Members from ALDE Party political family contribute five out of the 27 members of the European Commission:

State	Commissioner	Portfolio	Political party	Portrait
Estonia	Kaja Kallas	High Representative for Foreign Affairs and Security Policy, Vice President	ER	
(Republic of Ireland) Ireland	Michael McGrath	Democracy, Justice, the Rule of Law and Consumer Protection Commissioner	FF	
Slovenia	Marta Kos	Enlargement, Commissioner	Ind. (Note: Independent on the national level but affiliated with ALDE at the EU level)	
Belgium	Hadja Lahbib	Equality, Preparedness and Crisis Management Commissioner	MR	

== Elected representatives of member parties ==
=== European institutions ===
Organisation	Institution	Number of seats
European Union	European Parliament	55 / 720 (8%)
European Union	European Commission	5 / 27 (19%)
European Union	European Council (Heads of Government)	3 / 27 (11%)
European Union	Council of the European Union (Participation in Government)	
European Union	Committee of the Regions	44 / 329 (13%)
Council of Europe (as part of ALDE)	Parliamentary Assembly	88 / 612 (14%)

=== European Council ===
Member State	Title	Representative	Political party	Member of the Council since	Portrait
Estonia	Prime Minister	Kristen Michal	Estonian Reform Party	23 July 2024	
Ireland	Taoiseach	Micheál Martin	Fianna Fáil	23 January 2025	
Netherlands	Prime Minister	Rob Jetten	Democrats 66	23 February 2026	

=== In third countries ===
Through its associate and observer parties ALDE has two heads of state or government in non-EU countries:

State	Title	Representative	Political party	In power since	Portrait
Switzerland	Federal Councillor	Karin Keller-Sutter	FDP.The Liberals	1 January 2025	
Switzerland	Federal Councillor	Ignazio Cassis	FDP.The Liberals	1 November 2017	

=== National parliaments of European Union member states ===
Country	Institution	Number of seats	Member parties		Status
Austria	National Council; Lower house	18 / 183	NEOS		Government
Austria	Federal Council; Upper house	1 / 61	NEOS		Government
Belgium	Chamber of Representatives; Lower house	27 / 150	MR	19 / 27	Government
Belgium	Chamber of Representatives; Lower house	27 / 150	Open Vld	8 / 27	Opposition
Belgium	Senate; Upper house	12 / 60	MR	9 / 12	Government
Belgium	Senate; Upper house	12 / 60	Open Vld	3 / 12	Opposition
Bulgaria	National Assembly	16 / 240	PP		Opposition
Croatia	Sabor	8 / 151	HNS	1 / 8	Confidence and supply
Croatia	Sabor	8 / 151	HSLS	2 / 8	Confidence and supply
Croatia	Sabor	8 / 151	GLAS	1 / 8	Opposition
Croatia	Sabor	8 / 151	IDS-DDI	2 / 8	Opposition
Croatia	Sabor	8 / 151	Centar	2 / 8	Opposition
Cyprus	House of Representatives	0 / 56	Democratic Alignment		Extra-parliamentary
Denmark	Folketing	42 / 179	RV	10 / 42	Government
Denmark	Folketing	42 / 179	V	18 / 42	Opposition
Denmark	Folketing	42 / 179	M	14 / 42	Government
Estonia	Riigikogu	39 / 101	Reform		Government
Finland	Parliament	41 / 200	Kesk	22 / 32	Opposition
Finland	Parliament	41 / 200	SFP	10 / 32	Government
France	National Assembly; Lower house	8 / 577	UDI	7 / 8	Government
France	National Assembly; Lower house	8 / 577	PR	1 / 8	Government
France	Senate; Upper house	41 / 348	UDI	36 / 41	Government
France	Senate; Upper house	41 / 348	PR	5 / 41	Government
Germany	Bundestag	0 / 630	FDP		Extra-parliamentary
Hungary	Országgyűlés	0 / 199	Momentum		Extra-parliamentary
Ireland	Dáil; Lower house	48 / 174	FF		Government
Ireland	Seanad; Upper house	19 / 60	FF		Government
Italy	Chamber of Deputies; Lower house	12 / 400	A	10 / 12	Opposition
Italy	Chamber of Deputies; Lower house	12 / 400	RI, +E	2 / 12	Opposition
Italy	Senate of the Republic; Upper house	2 / 205	A		Opposition
Lithuania	Seimas	11 / 141	LRLS	11 / 141	Opposition
Lithuania	Seimas	11 / 141	LP	0 / 141	Extra-parliamentary
Latvia	Saeima	0 / 100	A/Par!		Extra-parliamentary
Luxembourg	Chamber of Deputies	14 / 60	DP		Government
Netherlands	House of Representatives; Lower house	48 / 150	D66	26 / 48	Government
Netherlands	House of Representatives; Lower house	48 / 150	VVD	22 / 48	Government
Netherlands	Senate; Upper house	16 / 75	D66	7 / 16	Government
Netherlands	Senate; Upper house	16 / 75	VVD	9 / 16	Government
Portugal	Assembly of the Republic	9 / 230	IL		Opposition
Romania	Chamber of Deputies; Lower house	40 / 330	USR		Government
Romania	Senate; Upper house	19 / 136	USR		Government
Slovakia	National Council	33 / 150	PS		Opposition
Slovenia	National Assembly	29 / 90	Freedom Movement		Opposition
Spain	Congress of Deputies; Lower house	0 / 350	Cs		Extra-parliamentary
Spain	Senate; Upper house	0 / 266	Cs		Extra-parliamentary
Sweden	Riksdag	40 / 349	C	24 / 40	Opposition
Sweden	Riksdag	40 / 349	L	16 / 40	Government

=== National parliaments outside the European Union ===
Country	Institution	Number of seats	Member parties
Andorra	General Council	14 / 28	DA, LA
Armenia	National Assembly	0 / 107	ANC, Bright Armenia
Azerbaijan	National Assembly	0 / 125	Musavat
Bosnia and Herzegovina	House of Representatives	2 / 42	Our Party
Georgia	Parliament	0 / 150	Lelo, SA, Republicans, Girchi MF, FD
Iceland	Althing	11 / 63	Viðreisn
Moldova	Parliament	0 / 101	PL
Montenegro	Assembly	0 / 81	LPCG
Norway	Storting	8 / 169	Venstre
Serbia	National Assembly	3 / 250	PSG
Switzerland	National Council; Lower house	38 / 200	FDP, GLP
Switzerland	Council of States; Upper house	11 / 46	FDP
Ukraine	Verkhovna Rada	251 / 450	Servant of the People, Voice
United Kingdom	House of Commons; Lower house	73 / 650	Liberal Democrats, Alliance
United Kingdom	House of Lords; Upper house	77 / 775	Liberal Democrats
United Kingdom	Gibraltar Parliament unicameral	2 / 17	Libs

== Membership ==
European states with parties associated with ALDE as full member or affiliate

As of January 2026 ALDE party had 55 full member and ten affiliated parties from EU and non-EU countries. Only delegates from full members of the ALDE Party and its youth wing LYMEC, together with the delegates of the ALDE Party Supporters and ALDE Party Bureau members, are permitted to vote at the ALDE Congress and Council. Affiliated member parties have non-voting delegates.

=== Full members ===
Country or Region	Party	MEPs (Note: The number of MEPs listed below may not match the total number of MEPs of the European party, as it does not include MEPs who join as individual members.)	
Andorra	Action for Andorra; Acció per Andorra	Not in EU	
Andorra	Liberals of Andorra; Liberals d'Andorra	Not in EU	
Austria	NEOS – The New Austria and Liberal Forum; NEOS – Das Neue Österreich und Liberales Forum	2 / 20	
Belgium	Reformist Movement; Mouvement Réformateur	3 / 8	
Belgium	Different; Anders	1 / 13	
Bosnia and Herzegovina	Our Party; Naša stranka	Not in EU	
Bulgaria	We Continue the Change; Продължаваме промяната Produlzhavame promyanata	2 / 17	
Croatia	Centre; Centar	0 / 12	
Croatia	Istrian Democratic Assembly; Istarski demokratski sabor Dieta democratica istriana	0 / 12	
Croatia	Cyprus	Democratic Alignment; Δημοκρατική Παράταξη; Dimokratiki Parataxi	0 / 6
Denmark	Social Liberal Party; Radikale Venstre	1 / 15	
Denmark	Venstre; Venstre	2 / 15	
Denmark	Moderates; Moderaterne	1 / 15	
Estonia	Estonian Reform Party; Eesti Reformierakond	1 / 7	
Finland	Centre Party; Suomen Keskusta	2 / 15	
Finland	Swedish People's Party of Finland; Svenska folkpartiet i Finland; Suomen ruotsalainen kansanpuolue	1 / 15	
France	Radical Party; Parti radical	0 / 81	
France	Union of Democrats and Independents; Union des démocrates et indépendants	1 / 81	
Georgia	Lelo for Georgia ლელო საქართველოსთვის lelo sakartvelostvis	Not in EU	
Georgia	Strategy Aghmashenebeli სტრატეგია აღმაშენებელი st'rat'egia aghmashenebeli	Not in EU	
Georgia	Girchi — More Freedom გირჩი — მეტი თავისუფლება girchi — met'i tavisupleba	Not in EU	
Germany	Free Democratic Party; Freie Demokratische Partei	5 / 96	
Hungary	Momentum Movement; Momentum Mozgalom	0 / 21	
Iceland	Viðreisn	Not in EU	
Ireland	Fianna Fáil – The Republican Party; Fianna Fáil – An Páirtí Poblachtánach	4 / 14	
Italy	Action; Azione	1 / 76	
Italy	Liberal Democratic Party; Partito Liberaldemocratico	0 / 76	
Italy	Italian Radicals; Radicali Italiani	0 / 76	
Italy	More Europe; Più Europa	0 / 76	
Kosovo	Democratic Party of Kosovo; Partia Demokratike e Kosovës	Not in EU	
Latvia	For Latvia's Development; Latvijas attīstībai	1 / 9	
Latvia	Movement For! Kustība Par!	0 / 9	
Lithuania	Freedom Party; Laisvės partija	1 / 11	
Lithuania	Liberals' Movement; Liberalų sąjūdis	1 / 11	
Luxembourg	Democratic Party; Demokratesch Partei; Parti Démocratique; Demokratische Partei	1 / 6	
Montenegro	Liberal Party of Montenegro; Либерална партија Црне Горе; Liberalna partija Crne Gore	Not in EU	
North Macedonia	Liberal Democratic Party; Либерално-демократска партија Liberalno-demokratska partija	Not in EU	
Netherlands	Democrats 66; Democraten 66	3 / 31	
Netherlands	People's Party for Freedom and Democracy; Volkspartij voor Vrijheid en Democratie	4 / 31	
Norway	Liberal Party; Venstre	Not in EU	
Portugal	Liberal Initiative; Iniciativa Liberal	2 / 21	
Romania	Save Romania Union; Uniunea Salvați România	2 / 33	
Serbia	Movement of Free Citizens; Покрет слободних грађана Pokret slobodnih građana	Not in EU	
Slovakia	Progressive Slovakia; Progresívne Slovensko	6 / 15	
Slovenia	Freedom Movement; Gibanje Svoboda	2 / 9	
Spain	Citizens; Ciudadanos	0 / 61	
Sweden	Centre Party; Centerpartiet	2 / 21	
Sweden	Liberals; Liberalerna	1 / 21	
Switzerland	FDP.The Liberals; FDP. Die Liberalen; PLR. Les Libéraux-Radicaux; PLR. I Liberali Radicali; PLD. Ils Liberals	Not in EU	
Switzerland	Green Liberal Party of Switzerland; Grünliberale Partei der Schweiz; Parti vert'libéral Partito verde liberale Partida verda-liberala	Not in EU	
Ukraine	Servant of the People; Слуга народу Sluha narodu	Not in EU	
Ukraine	Voice; Голос; Holos	Not in EU	
Ukraine	European Party of Ukraine; Європейська партія України; Yevropeis'ka partiya Ukrayiny	Not in EU	
United Kingdom	Liberal Democrats	Not in EU	

=== Affiliated members ===
- (Croatia) Croatian People's Party – Liberal Democrats
- (Croatia) Civic Liberal Alliance
- (Croatia) Croatian Social Liberal Party
- (Georgia (country)) Republican Party of Georgia
- (Georgia (country)) Droa
- (Italy) Team K
- (Ukraine) Civil Position
- (Ukraine) Power of the People
- (United Kingdom) Alliance Party of Northern Ireland
- Liberal Party of Gibraltar

=== Former members ===
- (Armenia) Armenian National Congress (2016–2025)
- Bright Armenia (2019–2025)
- (Azerbaijan) Musavat (2007–2025)
- (Belarus) Party of Freedom and Progress (2013–2024)
- (Bulgaria) National Movement for Stability and Progress
- (Bulgaria) Movement for Rights and Freedoms (2001–2024)
- (Croatia) Focus (2023–2026)
- (Croatia) Liberal Party
- (Croatia) Party of Liberal Democrats
- (Cyprus) United Democrats (1996–2025)
- (Czech Republic) ANO 2011 (2014–2024)
- (Estonia) Estonian Centre Party (2004–2024)
- (Georgia (country)) Free Democrats (2012–2025)
- (Greece) Drassi (2013–2014)
- (Hungary) Alliance of Free Democrats (2004–2009)
- (Hungary) Hungarian Liberal Party (2013–2025)
- (Iceland) Bright Future
- (Republic of Ireland) Progressive Democrats
- (Italy) Italian Liberal Party (1976–1994)
- (Italy) Italian Republican Party (1976–2010)
- Italy of Values
- New Kosovo Alliance (2009–2025)
- (Lithuania) Labour Party (2004–2021)
- (Lithuania) Liberal and Centre Union
- (Moldova) Coalition for Unity and Welfare (2023–2025)
- (Moldova) Liberal Party (2010–2025)
- (Malta) Democratic Party (2017–2020)
- Liberal Alliance of Montenegro (1994–2005)
- (Portugal) Social Democratic Party (until 1996)
- (Portugal) Earth Party
- (Romania) National Liberal Party (2007–2014)
- (Romania) Alliance of Liberals and Democrats (2015–2019)
- (Russia) Yabloko (2004–2025)
- (Russia) People's Freedom Party
- (Slovenia) Party of Alenka Bratušek (2014–2022)
- (Slovenia) List of Marjan Šarec (2018–2022)
- (Slovenia) Modern Centre Party (2014–2021)
- (Slovenia) Zares
- Liberal Democracy of Slovenia
- (Spain) Catalan European Democratic Party (until 2018)

=== Individual members ===
ALDE also includes a number of individual members. For many years, ALDE had the largest number of individual members of all European parties; however, this membership was discontinued with only one individual member remaining as of 2024. As most other European parties, it has not sought to develop mass individual membership.

Below is the evolution of individual membership of ALDE since 2019.

== Election results ==
European Parliament

Year	Lead candidate	% seats	Seats	Status	Ref.
2024	Marie-Agnes Strack-Zimmermann	7.2 (#4)	52 / 720	Coalition	

== See also ==
- European Liberal Forum
- European Liberal Youth
- European political party
- Authority for European Political Parties and European Political Foundations
- European political foundation
- Liberal International
- Political parties of the world
