= Hans-Jürgen Thies =

German politician

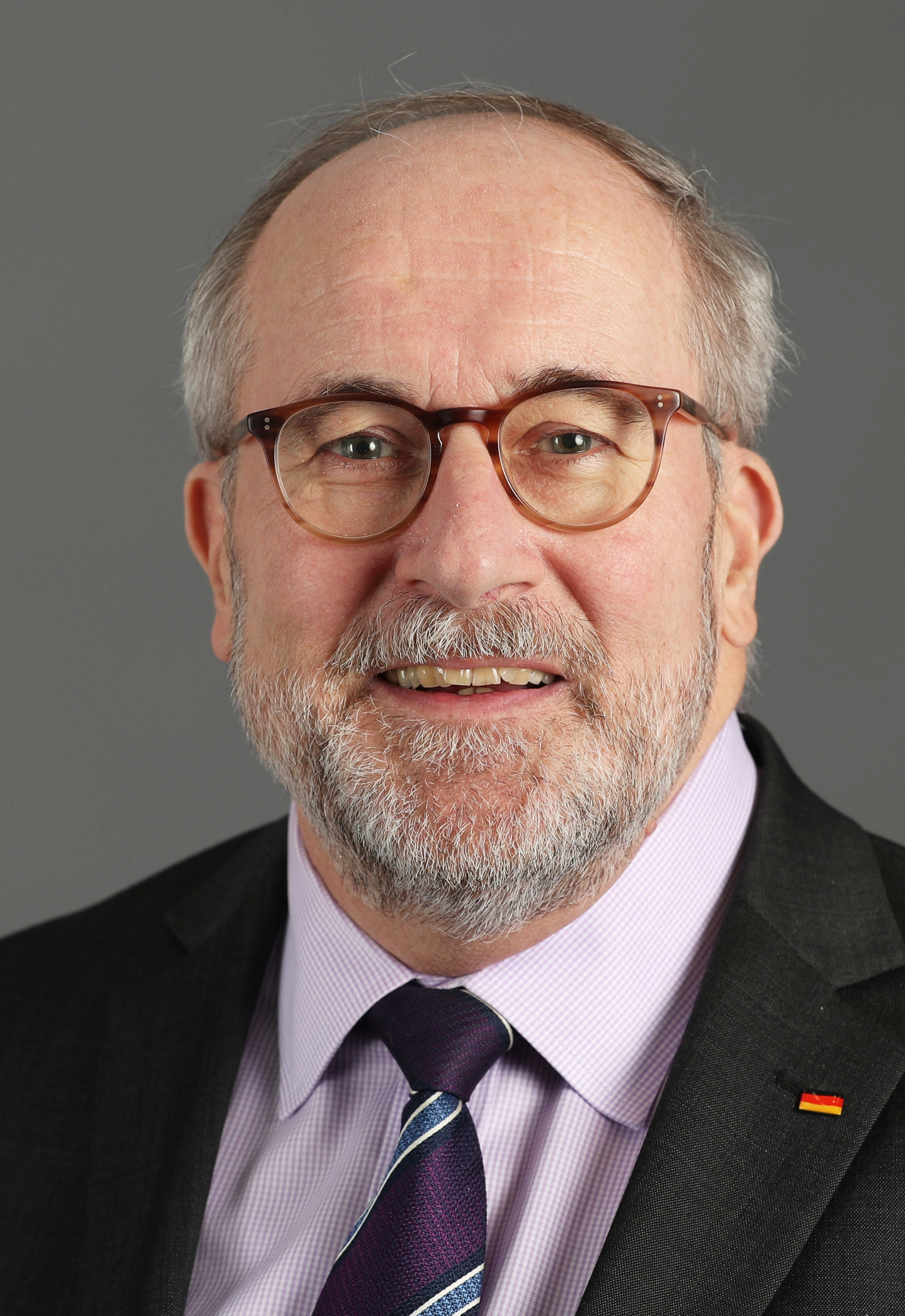
- Hans-Jürgen Thies in 2020

Member of the Bundestag for Soest
- Incumbent
- Assumed office 2017
- Preceded by: Bernhard Schulte-Drüggelte

Personal details
- Born: 11 August 1955 (age 71) Celle, West Germany (now Germany)
- Party: CDU
- Education: University of Göttingen

Hans-Jürgen Thies (born 11 August 1955) is a German lawyer and politician of the Christian Democratic Union (CDU) who has been serving as a member of the Bundestag from the state of North Rhine-Westphalia since 2017.

== Early life and career ==
After graduating from high school in 1974, he served for two years as a temporary soldier with the Army Aviation Corps. He then began his studies in law at the University of Göttingen, followed by a legal clerkship at the Higher Regional Court of Celle.

Since 1985, he has been practicing as a lawyer, initially working alone at the Higher Regional Court of Hamm, specializing in agricultural and real estate law. From 1985 to 2018, he was a partner in a large law firm in Hamm and has published numerous legal textbooks and articles.

== Political career ==
His political engagement began in 1971 with his membership in the Young Union and the CDU. From 1973 to 1976, he served as the district chairman of the Young Union in the Celle district and was a member of the CDU district board in Celle. Later, from 1992 to 1998, he was also active on the CDU district board in Hamm and has been involved in Soest since 2017.

In addition, he served as the legal advisor to the State Hunting Association of North Rhine-Westphalia from 2000 to 2016 and has been the vice president of the association since 2016. He is also a board member of the Wildlife and Biotope Protection Foundation of North Rhine-Westphalia and was a member of the WDR Broadcasting Council from 2016 to 2017.

Thies became member of the Bundestag in the 2017 German federal election for Soest. He is a member of the Committee on Legal Affairs and Consumer Protection and the Committee on Food and Agriculture.

In August 2024, Thies announced that he would not seek re-election to the Bundestag in the 2025 German federal election.

== Other activities ==
- German Bar Association (DAV), Member
