= Henning Höne =

German politician (born 1987)

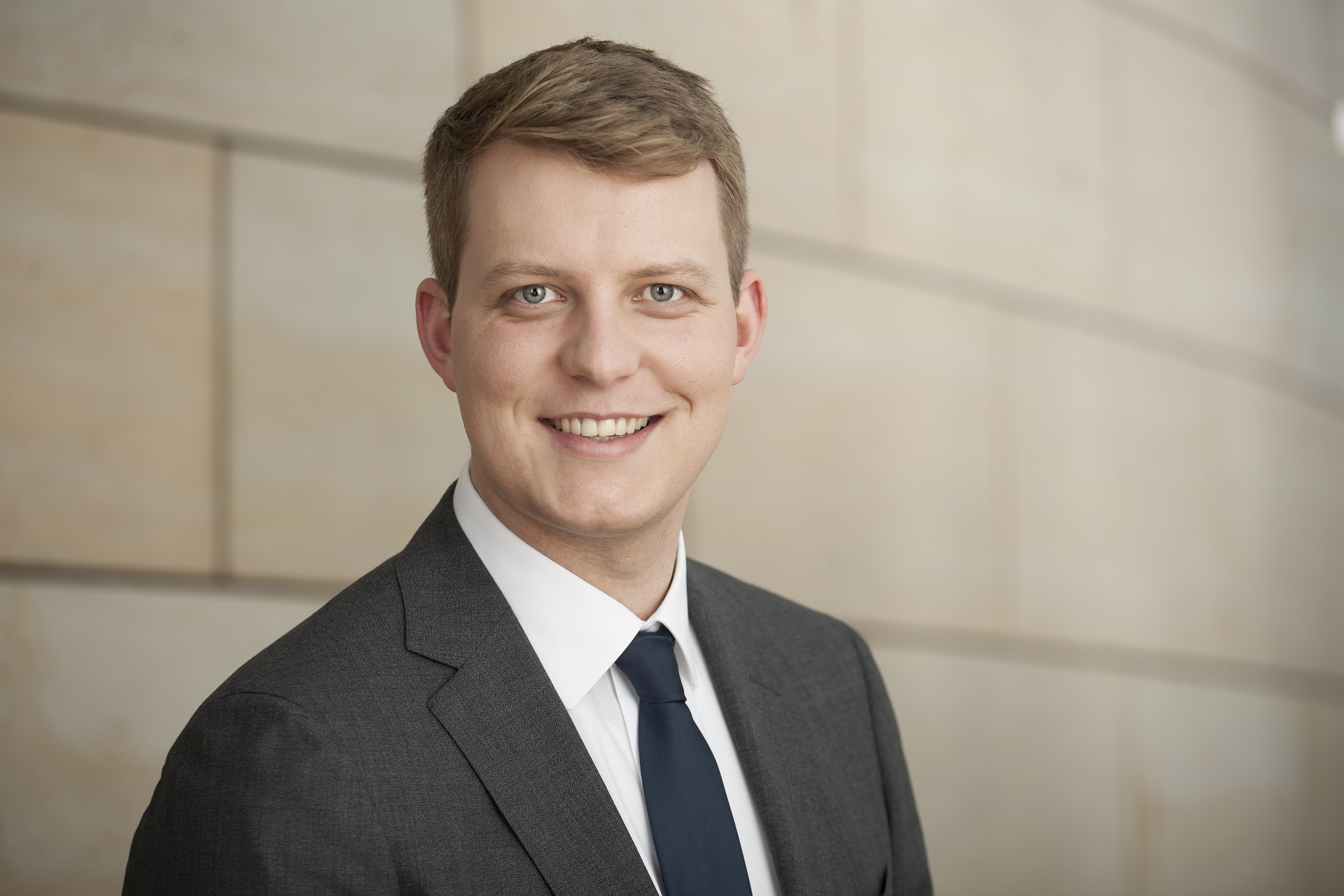
- Höne in 2015

Deputy Leader of the Free Democratic Party
- Incumbent
- Assumed office 16 May 2025
- Leader: Christian Dürr; Wolfgang Kubicki

Member of the Landtag of North Rhine-Westphalia
- Incumbent
- Assumed office 31 May 2012

Leader of the Free Democratic Party of North Rhine-Westphalia
- Incumbent
- Assumed office January 2023
- Preceded by: Joachim Stamp

Personal details
- Born: 9 March 1987 (age 39) Coesfeld
- Party: Free Democratic Party (since 2004)
- Education: University of Duisburg-Essen

Henning Höne (born 9 March 1987 in Coesfeld) is a German politician serving as a member of the Landtag of North Rhine-Westphalia since 2012. He has served as group leader of the Free Democratic Party since 2022, and as state president of the party since 2023.

Höne announced his intention to seek the leadership for the Free Democratic Party on 26 March 2026. Member of the European Parliament for the FDP Marie-Agnes Strack-Zimmerman immediately voiced her support.

On 30 May 2026 he was elected as First Deputy Leader of the FDP after the election of Wolfgang Kubicki as new party leader.

== Early life ==
Höne graduated from the St.-Pius-Gymnasium in his home town of Coesfeld in 2006, after which he spent a year of school abroad in Florida. After graduating from high school, he began a dual-study program for the study of business administration. During his studies, he completed training as an industrial clerk in 2008 and graduated with a Bachelor of Arts degree in early 2010. Höne worked in a training program for hülsta before beginning a Master's Degree program in the autumn of 2010, graduating with a Master of Science in Business Administration from the University of Duisburg-Essen in 2017.

Höne married in 2016, and has two children.
