= Bernhard Schulte-Drüggelte =

German politician

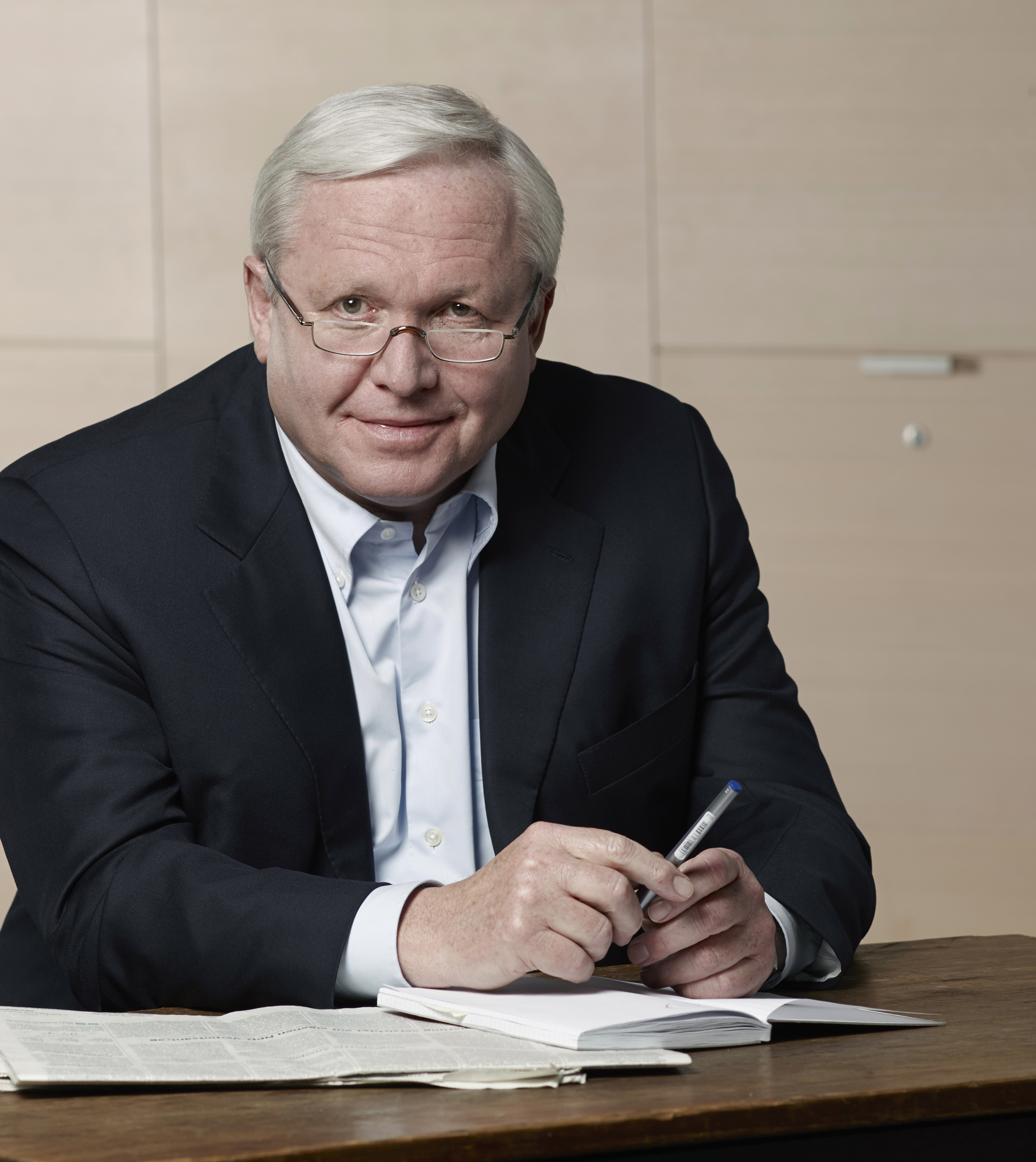
In 2013

Bernhard August Schulte-Drüggelte (born 1951) is a German politician of the Christian Democratic Union (CDU). From 2002 to 2017, he was member of the Bundestag.

== Life ==
Schulte-Drüggelte was born on 5 February 1951 in Möhnesee. He studied agricultural science at the Gesamthochschule Paderborn, the Georg-August-Universität of Göttingen and the Rheinische Friedrich-Wilhelms-Universität of Bonn and acquired an agricultural engineer's diploma.

Schulte-Drüggelte is married and has four children.

== Political Work ==
Schulte-Drüggelte joined the CDU in 1972 and was from 1995 to 2015 chairman of the party's district association in Soest. From 1979 to 1989, he was member of the district parliament (Kreistag) of the Kreis Soest.

From 2002 to 2017, Schulte-Drüggelte was member of the Bundestag. Each time, he was elected by winning the Soest electoral district. The votes he received in the district throughout the years are as follows:

- 2002: 44,2 %,
- 2005: 46,3 %,
- 2009: 45,8 %
- 2013: 49,8 %
