= Jürgen Augustinowitz =

German politician

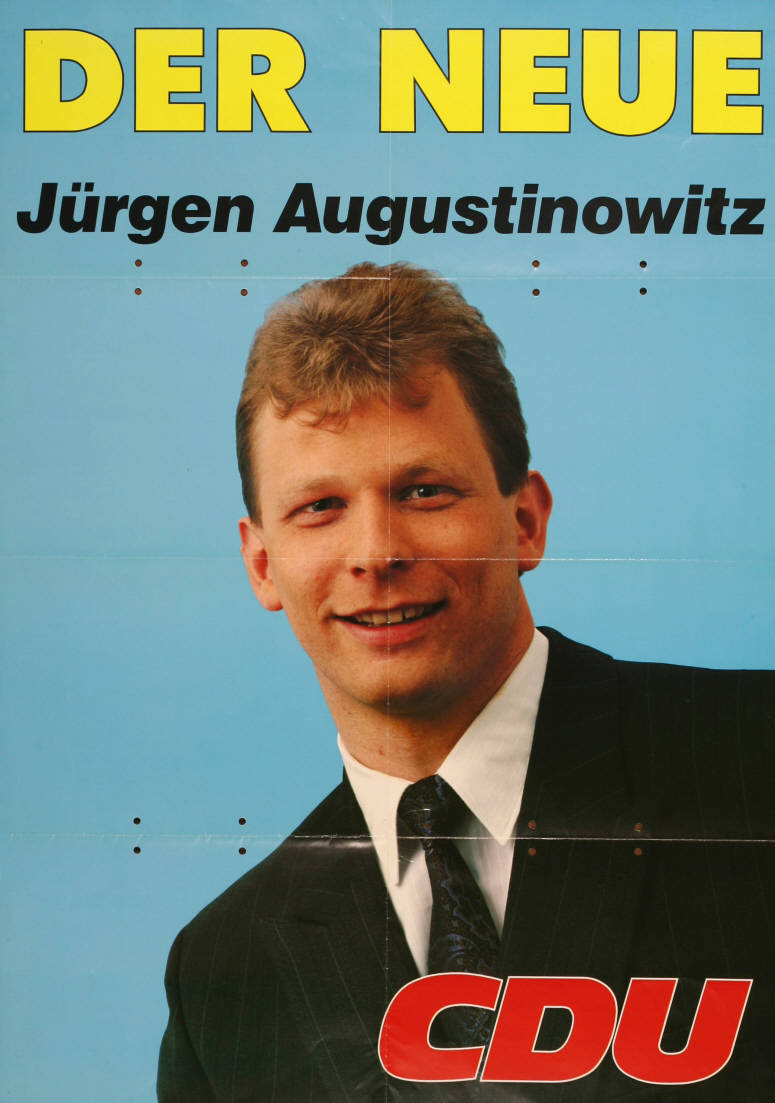
- Election poster by Jürgen Augustinowitz 1990

Member of the Bundestag
- In office 20 December 1990 – 26 October 1998

Personal details
- Born: 10 June 1964 (age 61) Rinteln, West Germany (now Germany)
- Party: CDU
- Children: 2
- Occupation: Banker

Jürgen Augustinowitz (born 10 June 1964) is a German politician and former member of the German Bundestag.

== Life ==
After secondary modern school he attended commercial school and then trained as a bank clerk. In 1985/86, he did his military service. After the German Armed Forces, he worked as a banker and finally worked in a corporate client department in a branch of Deutsche Bank AG in Lippstadt.

He is catholic and married. He has two sons.

From 20 December 1990 to 26 October 1998, he was a member of the German Bundestag (CDU) twice for the constituency of Soest (North Rhine-Westphalia).
