= Svenja Hahn =

German politician

Svenja Hahn MEP
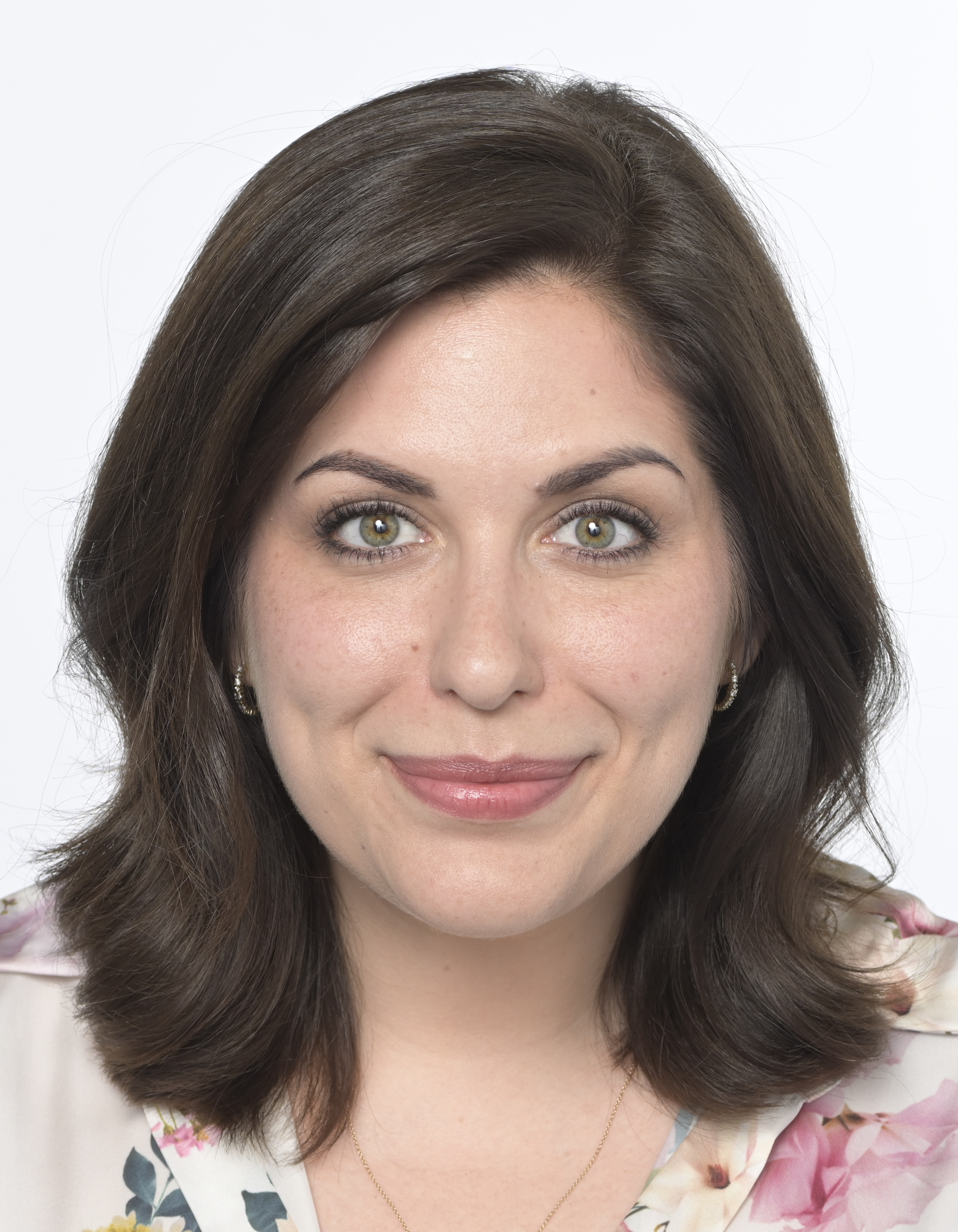

Member of the European Parliament for Germany

Personal details
- Born: July 25, 1989 (age 37) Hamburg, West Germany (now Germany)
- Party: German: Free Democratic Party; EU: Alliance of Liberals and Democrats for Europe
- Education: University of Giessen; Humboldt University of Berlin

Svenja Ilona Hahn (born 25 July 1989) is a German politician of the Free Democratic Party (FDP) who has been serving as a Member of the European Parliament since 2019, and as President of the Alliance of Liberals and Democrats for Europe Party since 2024.

== Early life and career ==
Hahn was born in Hamburg and grew up in Schleswig-Holstein. She studied history and cultural studies at the University of Giessen and, on a scholarship of the Friedrich Naumann Foundation, media studies at the Humboldt University of Berlin.

From 2015 until 2019, Hahn worked on public relations at edding in Hamburg.

== Political career ==
=== Member of the European Parliament, 2019–present ===
Hahn has been a Member of the European Parliament since the 2019 European elections. She has since been serving on the Committee on the Internal Market and Consumer Protection. In 2020, she also joined the Special Committee on Artificial Intelligence in a Digital Age. In this capacity, she has been one of the parliament’s shadow rapporteurs on the Artificial Intelligence Act.

In addition to her committee assignments, Hahn is part of the Parliament's delegation for relations with the countries of Southeast Asia and the Association of Southeast Asian Nations (ASEAN). She is also a member of the Spinelli Group, the European Parliament Intergroup on Anti-Racism and Diversity, the European Parliament Intergroup on LGBT Rights and the European Parliament Intergroup on Seas, Rivers, Islands and Coastal Areas.

Hahn served as President of the European Liberal Youth (Lymec) from 2018 to 2020. In 2020, she joined the board of the European Liberal Forum as First Vice-President.

=== Role in national politics ===
In the negotiations to form a so-called traffic light coalition of the Social Democratic Party (SPD), the Green Party and the FDP following the 2021 federal elections, Hahn was part of her party's delegation in the working group on homeland security, civil rights and consumer protection, co-chaired by Christine Lambrecht, Konstantin von Notz and Wolfgang Kubicki.
