= 1992 Schleswig-Holstein state election =

German state election

- 5 April 1992

All 89 seats in the Landtag of Schleswig-Holstein 45 seats needed for a majority
- Turnout: 1,487,909 (71.7%) ▼5.7%
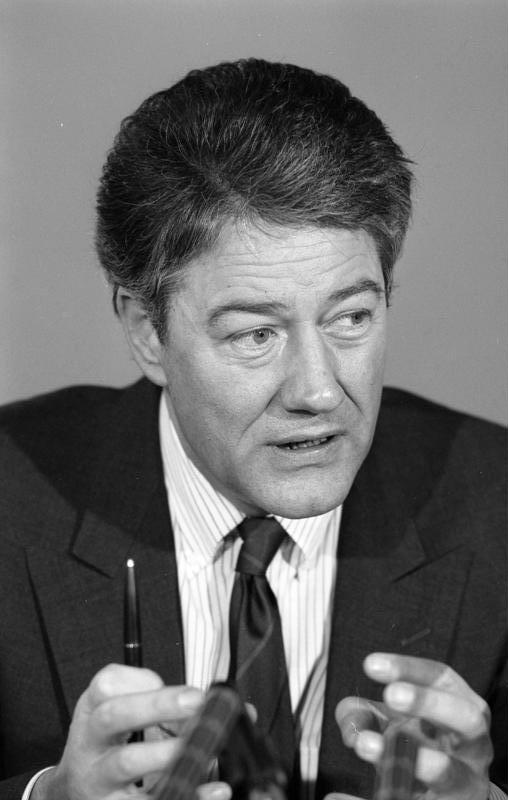

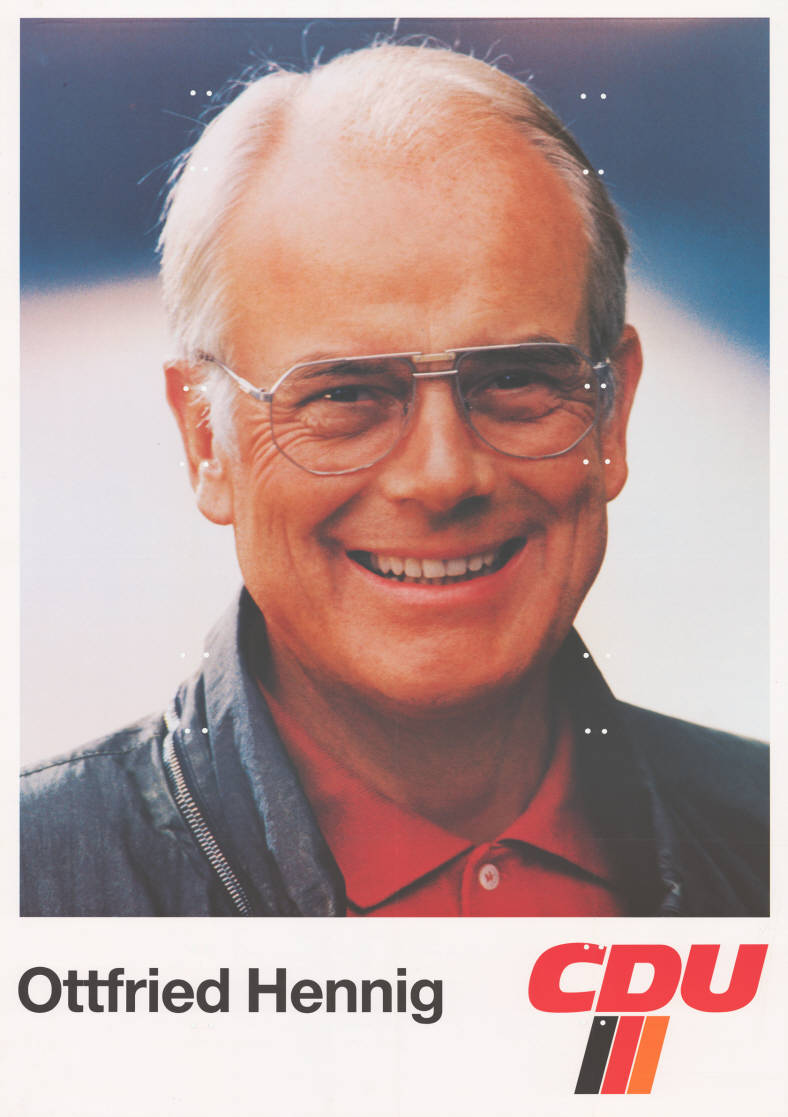
	First party	Second party	Third party
Leader	Björn Engholm	Ottfried Hennig
Party	SPD	CDU	DVU
Last election	46 seats, 54.8%	27 seats, 33.3%	Did not run
Seats won	45	32	6
Seat change	▼1	▲5	▲6
Popular vote	687,427	503,510	93,295
Percentage	46.2%	33.8%	6.3%
Swing	▼8.6%	▲0.5%	▲6.3%
	Fourth party	Fifth party	Sixth party
Party	FDP	Greens	SSW
Last election	0 seats, 4.4%	0 seats, 2.9%	1 seat, 1.7%
Seats won	5	0	1
Seat change	▲5	0	0
Popular vote	86,227	71,014	28,245
Percentage	5.6%	5.0%	1.9%
Swing	▲1.2%	▲2.1%	▲0.2%
- Results for the single-member constituencies
Minister-President before election
Björn Engholm
SPD
Elected Minister-President
Björn Engholm
SPD

The 1992 Schleswig-Holstein state election was held on 5 April 1992 to elect the members of the Landtag of Schleswig-Holstein. The incumbent Social Democratic Party (SPD) government led by Minister-President Björn Engholm narrowly retained its majority by a margin of one seat. The major change of the election was the entry of the national conservative German People's Union to the Landtag. The Free Democratic Party also re-entered the Landtag, while The Greens failed to surpass the threshold by a margin of 0.03%.

== Parties ==
The table below lists parties represented in the previous Landtag of Schleswig-Holstein.

Name		Ideology	Leader(s)	1988 result	
Name		Ideology	Leader(s)	Votes (%)	Seats
SPD	Social Democratic Party of Germany; Sozialdemokratische Partei Deutschlands	Social democracy	Björn Engholm	54.8%	46 / 74
CDU	Christian Democratic Union of Germany; Christlich Demokratische Union Deutschlands	Christian democracy	Ottfried Hennig	33.3%	27 / 74
SSW	South Schleswig Voters' Association; Südschleswigscher Wählerverband	Danish and Frisian minority interests		1.7%	1 / 74

== Election result ==
Summary of the 5 April 1992 election results for the Landtag of Schleswig-Holstein
Party	Votes	%	+/-	Seats	+/-	Seats %
Social Democratic Party (SPD)	687,427	46.2	▼8.6	45	▼1	50.6
Christian Democratic Union (CDU)	503,510	33.8	▲0.5	32	▲5	36.0
German People's Union (DVU)	93,295	6.3	▲6.4	6	▲6	6.7
Free Democratic Party (FDP)	82,963	5.6	▲1.2	5	▲5	5.6
South Schleswig Voters' Association (SSW)	28,245	1.9	▲0.2	1	±0	1.1
Alliance 90/The Greens (Grüne)	74,014	5.0	▲2.9	0	±0	0
The Republicans (REP)	18,225	1.2	▲0.6	0	±0	0
Others	230	0.0		0	±0	0
Total	1,487,909	100.0		89	▲15	
Voter turnout		71.7	▼5.7			

Popular Vote
SPD	46.20%
CDU	33.84%
DVU	6.27%
FDP	5.58%
B'90/GRÜNE	4.97%
SSW	1.90%
Other	1.24%

Landtag seats
SPD	50.56%
CDU	35.96%
DVU	6.74%
FDP	5.62%
SSW	1.12%

== Sources ==
- Wahlen in Schleswig-Holstein seit 1947
