= Christian Dürr =

German politician (born 1977)

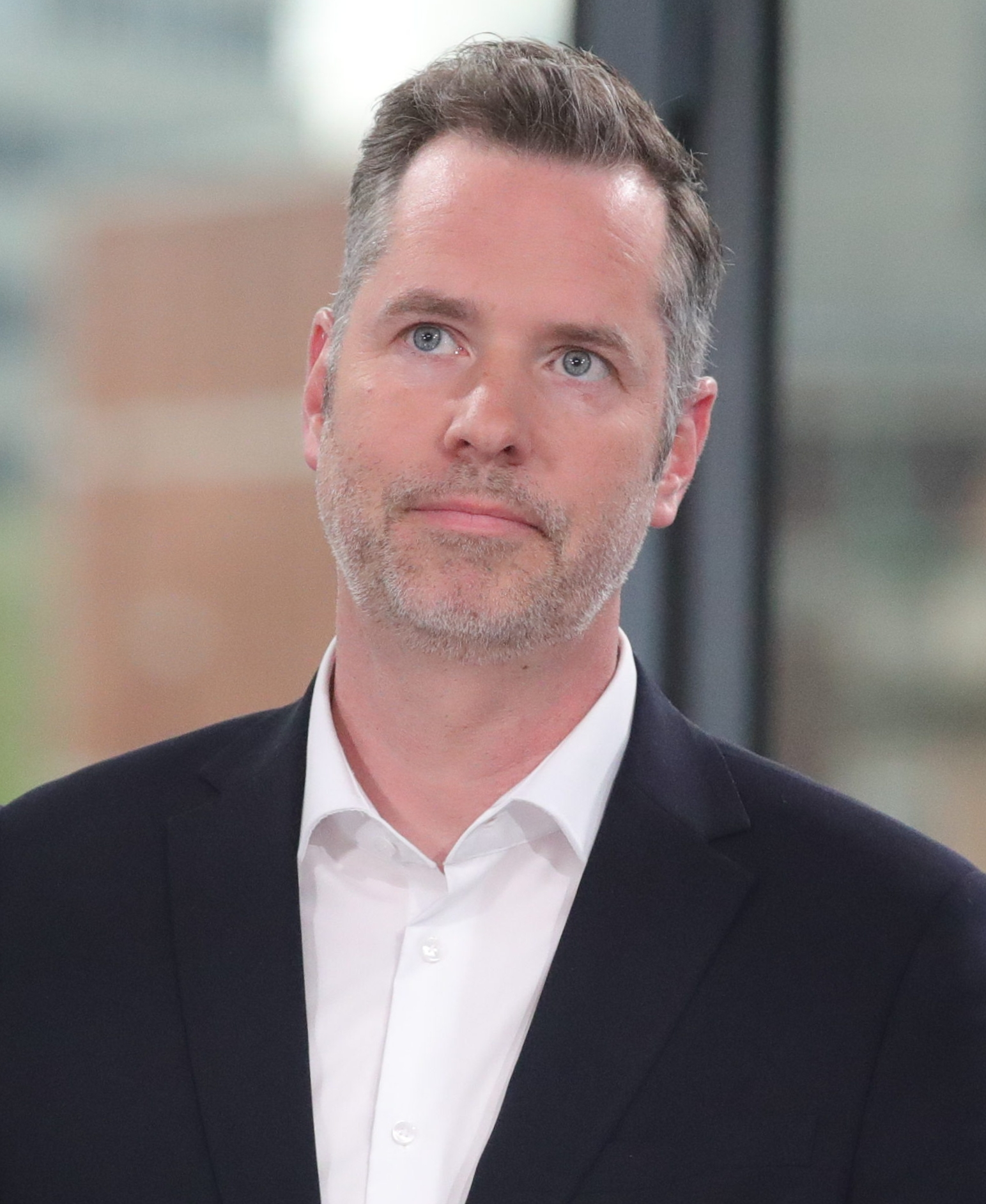
- Dürr in 2023

Leader of the Free Democratic Party
- In office 16 May 2025 – 30 May 2026
- Deputy: Wolfgang Kubicki; Nicola Beer; Johannes Vogel
- Preceded by: Christian Lindner
- Succeeded by: Wolfgang Kubicki

Leader of the Free Democratic Party in the Bundestag
- In office 7 December 2021 – 25 March 2025
- Chief Whip: Johannes Vogel
- Deputy: Gyde Jensen; Lukas Köhler; Carina Konrad; Konstantin Kuhle; Alexander Graf Lambsdorff; Christoph Meyer
- Preceded by: Christian Lindner
- Succeeded by: Office abolished

Member of the Bundestag for Lower Saxony
- In office 24 October 2017 – 25 March 2025
- Constituency: FDP List

Leader of the Free Democratic Party in the Landtag of Lower Saxony
- In office 17 February 2009 – 26 September 2017
- Preceded by: Jörg Bode
- Succeeded by: Stefan Birkner

Member of the Landtag of Lower Saxony
- In office 4 March 2003 – 14 November 2017
- Constituency: FDP List

Personal details
- Born: 18 April 1977 (age 49) Delmenhorst, Lower Saxony, West Germany (now Germany)
- Party: FDP
- Education: Leibniz University Hannover
- Website: http://christian-duerr.de/

Christian Dürr (born 18 April 1977) is a German politician who served as the Leader of the Free Democratic Party from 2025 to 2026. He previously led the party's parliamentary group in the Bundestag from 2021 to 2025. He was a member of the Bundestag from 2017 to 2025.

== Early life and education ==
Dürr was born in Delmenhorst. He graduated in economics from Leibniz University Hannover, with a thesis on emissions trading.

== Political career ==
=== Career in state politics ===
Dürr was first elected to the Lower Saxon Landtag in the 2003 state elections. He was his parliamentary group's spokesperson on environmental policy (2003–2009) and media policy (2013–2017). Between 2009 and 2017, he served as chairman of the parliamentary group; in this role, he succeeded Jörg Bode.

=== Member of the German Bundestag, 2017–2025 ===
Dürr first became a member of the German Bundestag in the 2017 elections, representing the Delmenhorst – Wesermarsch – Oldenburg-Land district. Within his parliamentary group, he chaired the Bundestag group of FDP parliamentarians from Lower Saxony, Hamburg and Schleswig-Holstein. He also served as one of six deputy chairpersons of the FDP parliamentary group under the leadership of its chairman Christian Lindner, where he oversaw the group's activities on finance and budget policy.

Ahead of the 2021 election, Dürr was elected to lead the FDP's campaign in Lower Saxony.

In the negotiations to form a so-called traffic light coalition of the Social Democrats (SPD), the Green Party and the FDP following the 2021 federal elections, Dürr led his party's delegation in the working group on financial regulation and the national budget; his co-chairs from the other parties were Doris Ahnen and Lisa Paus.

In December 2021, Dürr was elected leader of the FDP parliamentary group in the Bundestag, succeeding Christian Lindner. In 2023, he was re-elected by 93 percent of his parliamentary group's members.

On 6 November 2024, the coalition broke. A Bundestag snap election took place on 23 February 2025. The FDP recorded their worst historical result with 4.3%, and lost all representation in the Bundestag (Five percent hurdle). Lindner stepped down as FDP chairman.

In mid-March 2025, Dürr announced his candidacy for the party chairmanship and on May 16, 2025, he was elected at a federal party convention. Under his leadership, the FDP failed to regain seats in the state parliaments of Baden-Württemberg and in Rhineland-Palatinate.

== Later career ==
In 2026, Dürr joined Munich-based startup GLE350 as managing director.

== Other activities ==
=== Government agencies ===
- Institute for Federal Real Estate (BImA), Member of the Supervisory Board (since 2018)

=== Corporate boards ===
- Universum AG, Member of the Supervisory Board

=== Non-profits ===
- Bundesverband der Unternehmervereinigungen (BUV), Member of the Advisory Board
- SV Werder Bremen, Member

== Political positions ==
In January 2022, Dürr told business magazine Wirtschaftswoche that Germany needs to attract 400,000 foreign workers a year.
