= Wolfgang Hellmich =

German politician

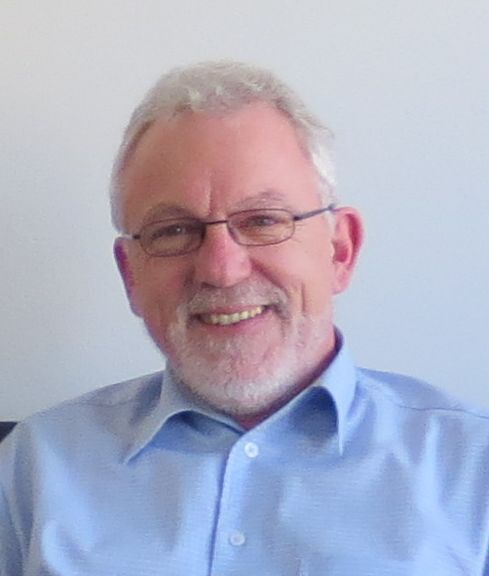
- Wolfgang Hellmich in 2012

Member of the Bundestag
- In office 2012–2025

Personal details
- Born: 5 May 1958 (age 67) Welver, West Germany (now Germany)
- Party: SPD

Wolfgang Hellmich (born 5 May 1958) is a German politician of the Social Democratic Party (SPD) who served as a member of the Bundestag from the state of North Rhine-Westphalia from 2012 to 2025.

== Political career ==
Hellmich became a member of the Bundestag in 2012 when he took the seat vacated by Michael Groschek. He was also a member of the Defence Committee – which he chaired from 2015 until 2021 – and the 1st Committee of Inquiry of the Defence Committee.

In addition to his committee assignments, Hellmich co-chaired the German-Slovenian Parliamentary Friendship Group from 2014 until 2019. From 2014, he was also a member of the German delegation to the NATO Parliamentary Assembly, where he is part of the Defence and Security Committee and the Political Committee. In 2022, he joined the parliamentary body charged with overseeing a 100 billion euro special fund to strengthen Germany’s armed forces.

In 2024, Hellmich announced that he was not seeking re-election.

== Other activities ==
- Berlin Security Conference, Member of the Advisory Board
- Deutsche Maritime Akademie, Member of the Advisory Board
- IG Bergbau, Chemie, Energie (IG BCE), Member
- IG Metall, Member
