= Michael Eichberger =

German law scientist

Justice of the Federal Constitutional Court of Germany
- In office 25 April 2006 – 16 July 2018

Michael Eichberger (born 23 June 1953) is a German law scientist who served as a justice of the Federal Constitutional Court of Germany from 2006 until 2018.

== Education ==
Eichberger was born in Würzburg on 23 June 1953.

Following his first state exam in law in 1979 in Mannheim and his second one in 1981 in Baden-Württemberg, he was a research assistant at the University of Mainz until 1984. He did his doctoral dissertation there in 1985.

== Career ==
=== Early career ===
Between 1984 and 1986, Eichberger was a judge at the administrative court in Karlsruhe. From 1986 until 1989, he worked at the Justice Ministry of Baden-Württemberg. He then worked at the Federal Constitutional Court of Germany as a research assistant until 1991. Since 1992 he was a judge at administrative court in Karlsruhe again, and in 1993 he was delegated as a judge to the Higher Administrative Court of Baden-Württemberg in Mannheim, where he stayed until 1998. Since 1998/99 he was a docent at the University of Tübingen. Between 1998 and 2006 he was a judge at the Federal Administrative Court of Germany (BVerwG) in Leipzig as well. From 1998 to 2002, he was a member of the Senate for the law concerning aliens and law of asylum. He subsequently served on the Senates for road and railway line planning, land reorganisation, revenue and tax law. In 2004, he became an honorary professor at the University of Tübingen.

=== Judge of the Federal Constitutional Court of Germany ===
Nominated by the CDU/CSU parliamentary group, Eichberger was appointed as a judge at the Federal Constitutional Court of Germany in April 2006. He served on the First Senate until his term expired in July 2018.

On the initiative of then-president Andreas Voßkuhle, Eichberger was one of four justices who were mandated in 2016 to draft a revised code of conduct, which set out rules for the justices' public appearances, gifts, secondary income and other aspects.

== Other activities ==
- International Commission of Jurists, member
