= Hans Hugo Klein =

German politician

Justice of the Federal Constitutional Court
- In office 20 December 1983 – 3 May 1996
- Nominated by: CDU/CSU
- Preceded by: Werner Böhmer
- Succeeded by: Otto Seidl

Parliamentary State Secretary for the Minister of Justice
- In office 4 October 1982 – 3 November 1983
- Minister: Hans A. Engelhard
- Preceded by: Hans de With
- Succeeded by: Benno Erhard

Member of the Bundestag; from Lower Saxony
- In office 13 December 1972 – 20 December 1983
- Preceded by: Multi-member district
- Succeeded by: Hans-Peter Voigt
- Constituency: State list (1972–1983); Göttingen (1983)

Personal details
- Born: 5 August 1936 (age 90) Karlsruhe, Germany
- Party: Christian Democratic Union
- Children: 2
- Education: Bismarck Gymnasium Karlsruhe; Heidelberg University; LMU Munich

Hans Hugo Klein (born 5 August 1936) is a German politician. He was a representative of the Christian Democratic Union from 1983 to 1996 and he a justice of the Federal Constitutional Court.

== Career ==
Klein studied law in Heidelberg and Munich, where he graduated with his Ph.D. in 1961. Then he moved to the Management Service of Baden-Wuerttemberg, lost but not the scientific career from his eyes, which led 1967 Habilitation on the topic "Participation of the state in economic competition with Ernst Forsthoff at the University of Heidelberg. In 1969 Hans Hugo Klein became a professor for Public Law at the University of Göttingen. In 1970, he joined the CDU, where he was the German Bundestag from 1972 to 1983. He moved in 1972, 1976 and 1980, one of the Land of Lower Saxony CDU in parliament, winning 1983, the direct mandate in the constituency of Göttingen.

From 1982 to 1983 he was among Hans A. Engelhard also Parliamentary State Secretary in the Ministry of Justice.

In 1983 he was appointed as a judge of the Constitutional Court. During his tenure at the Federal Klein belonged to the Second Senate of the court. His responsibilities with the Federal Party were right, the right of the public service and staff representation rights. He was succeeded by Hans-Joachim Jentsch.

For constitutional matters Hans Hugo Klein believes that it is acting in the Basic Law for a mixed constitution. Mixed is the democratic constitutional state in the Federal Republic of Germany, since democracy is not absolutely true. Particular importance come to the concept of representative democracy. The political parties were in the process, despite the criticism is often practiced in them, constitutionally necessary component of liberal democracy.

== See also ==
- List of German Christian Democratic Union politicians
