= Franz Wessel =

German judge

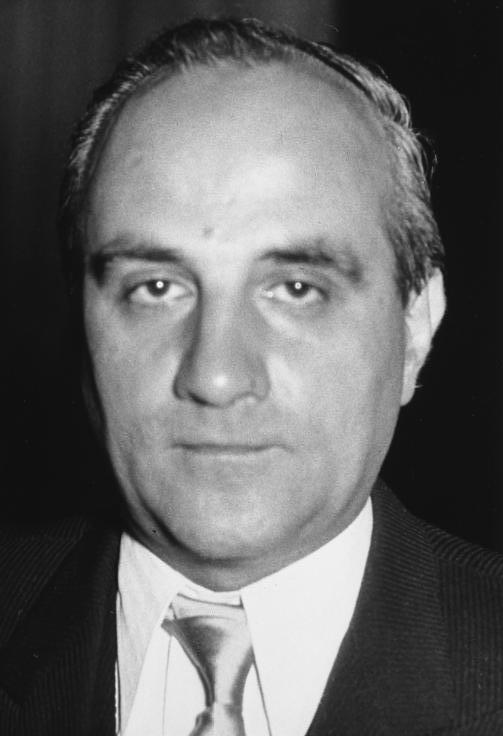
- Franz Wessel in 1951

Justice of the Federal Constitutional Court of Germany
- In office 7 September 1951 – 11 September 1958

Franz Wessel (March 6, 1903 – in Stüblau near Danzig; September 10, 1958) was a German judge. He visited school in Königsberg and studied legal science in Königsberg, Heidelberg and Kiel. He was a justice of the Federal Constitutional Court in the 1950s.
