= Konrad Kruis =

German lawyer and judge (1930–2022)

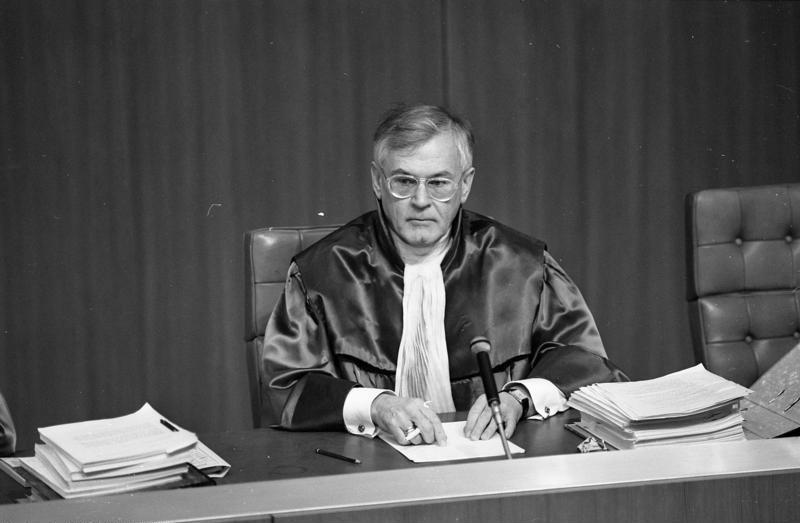
- Kruis in 1989

Justice of the Federal Constitutional Court of Germany
- In office 16 November 1987 – 28 September 1998
- Preceded by: Engelbert Niebler
- Succeeded by: Siegfried Broß

Personal details
- Born: 11 May 1930 Munich, Bavaria, Germany
- Died: 26 December 2022 (aged 92) Munich, Bavaria, Germany
- Education: LMU Munich
- Occupation: Lawyer; Judge

Konrad Kruis (11 May 1930 – 26 December 2022) was a German lawyer and judge. He served on the Federal Constitutional Court from 1987 to 1998.

Kruis died in Munich on 26 December 2022, at the age of 92.
