= Karin Graßhof =

German jurist (1937–2025)

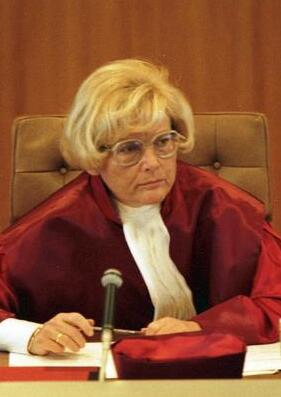
- Graßhof in 1989

Justice of the Federal Constitutional Court of Germany
- In office 8 October 1986 – 15 October 1998

Personal details
- Born: 25 June 1937 Kiel, Gau Schleswig-Holstein, Germany
- Died: 10 June 2025 (aged 87) Bonn, North Rhine-Westphalia, Germany
- Occupation: Judge

Karin Graßhof (25 June 1937 – 10 June 2025) was a German jurist. She served as a justice of the Federal Constitutional Court of Germany from 1986 to 1998. Later, she was an honorary professor at the University of Bonn.

As a judge, she was involved in the decision of the Federal Constitutional Court of 14 September 1989, on the use of the diary of a prisoner; the decision on the five-percent hurdle in the first all-German election; the decision on the right of foreigners to vote in Schleswig-Holstein; the decision on Section 218 of 28 May 1993; the Maastricht ruling of 12 October 1993; the AWACS decision of 12 July 1994; the decision on the criminal liability of GDR foreign espionage of 15 May 1995; the decision on the Mauerschützenprozesse of 26 October 1996; the decisions on the admissibility of overhang mandates of 10 April 1997 and 26 February 1998; and the decision on the introduction of the euro of 31 March 1998. On 10 June 2025, Graßhof died at the age of 87.
