= Willi Geiger =

Willi Geiger may refer to:

- Willi Geiger (judge) (1909–1994), German judge: president of the Federal Court of Justice of Germany
1. and Associate Justice in the Federal Constitutional Court of Germany
- Willi Geiger (painter) (1878–1971), German painter
