= Everhardt Franßen =

German judge

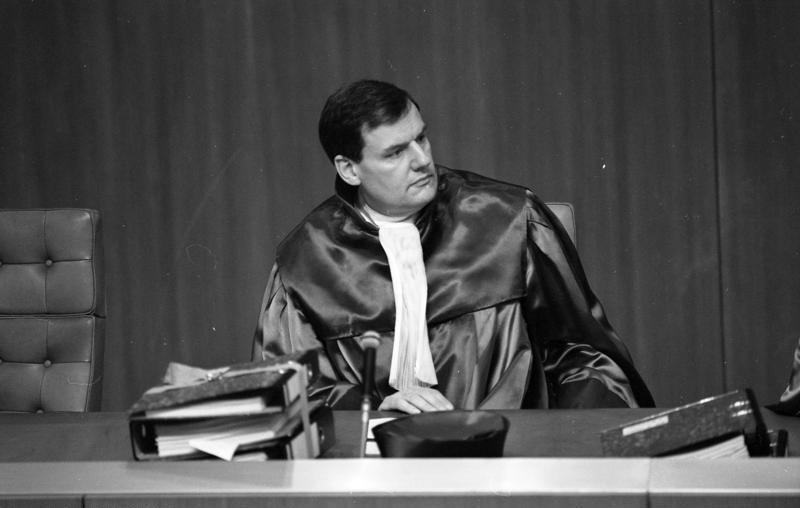
- Everhardt Franßen in 1989

Justice of the Federal Constitutional Court of Germany
- In office 16 November 1987 – 30 June 1991

Everhardt Franßen (born October 1, 1937 in Essen) is a retired German judge. He was a justice of the Federal Constitutional Court of Germany and a judge at the Federal Administrative Court of Germany, presiding over the latter between 1991 and 2002. He studied legal science in Mainz and Münster. He is married and has two children.
