= Lerke Osterloh =

German judge, jurisprudent and tax law expert

Justice of the Federal Constitutional Court of Germany
- In office 15 October 1998 – 16 November 2010
- Succeeded by: Monika Hermanns

Lerke Osterloh (born 29 September 1944 in Wüsting-Holle near Oldenburg) is a German judge, jurisprudent and tax law expert. She was sitting Justice of the Federal Constitutional Court of Germany in the court's second senate from October 1998 until her retirement in November 2010. Her successor is Monika Hermanns. Along with Gertrude Lübbe-Wolff and Michael Gerhardt, she was considered a member of the senate's left-liberal wing.

She was awarded the Grand Cross with Star and Shoulder Ribbon of the Order of Merit of the Federal Republic of Germany.

Osterloh is married with no children and lives in Berlin.

== See also ==
Federal Constitutional Court of Germany
