= Walter Rudi Wand =

German judge and bureaucrat

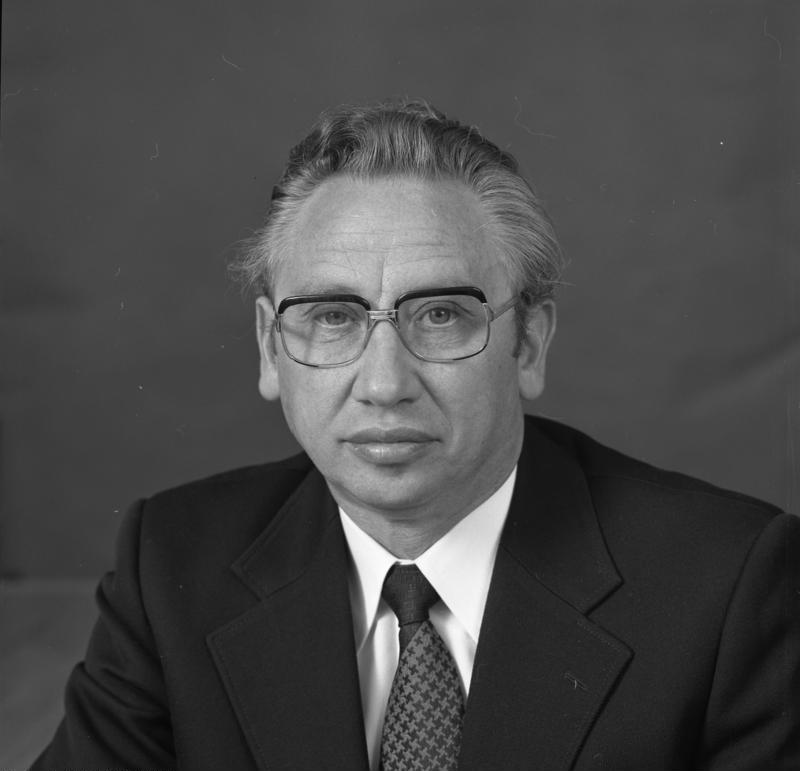
- Walter Rudi Wand in 1976

Justice of the Federal Constitutional Court of Germany
- In office 26 October 1970 – 20 December 1983

Walter Rudi Wand (7 September 1928 in Kleinkeula – 29 June 1985 in Karlsruhe) was a German judge and bureaucrat. He studied legal science in Jena and Berlin. He was a justice of the Federal Constitutional Court.
