= Hans Georg Rupp =

West German judge

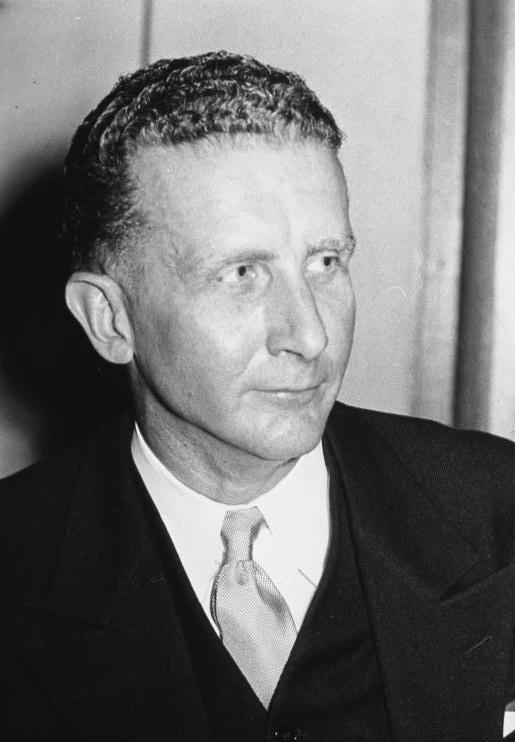
- Hans Gerorg Rupp in 1951

Justice of the Federal Constitutional Court of Germany
- In office 7 September 1951 – 7 November 1975

Hans Georg Rupp (30 August 1907 in Stuttgart – 14 September 1989 in Münsingen) was a West German judge. He was a justice of the Federal Constitutional Court from 1951 to 1975.

A few months before the end of his term, he cast the only special vote that was written exclusively by him. In the decision on the Radical Decree, he voted against his colleagues because he considered it a violation of Article 21 of the Basic Law for the hiring authority to consider mere membership at a party that had not been declared unconstitutional by the Federal Constitutional Court to be to the applicant's disadvantage. After 24 years on the Federal Constitutional Court, he retired in September 1975. Only Willi Geiger could look back on an even longer term of office.
