= Gisela Niemeyer =

German judge and jurist (1923 – 2012)

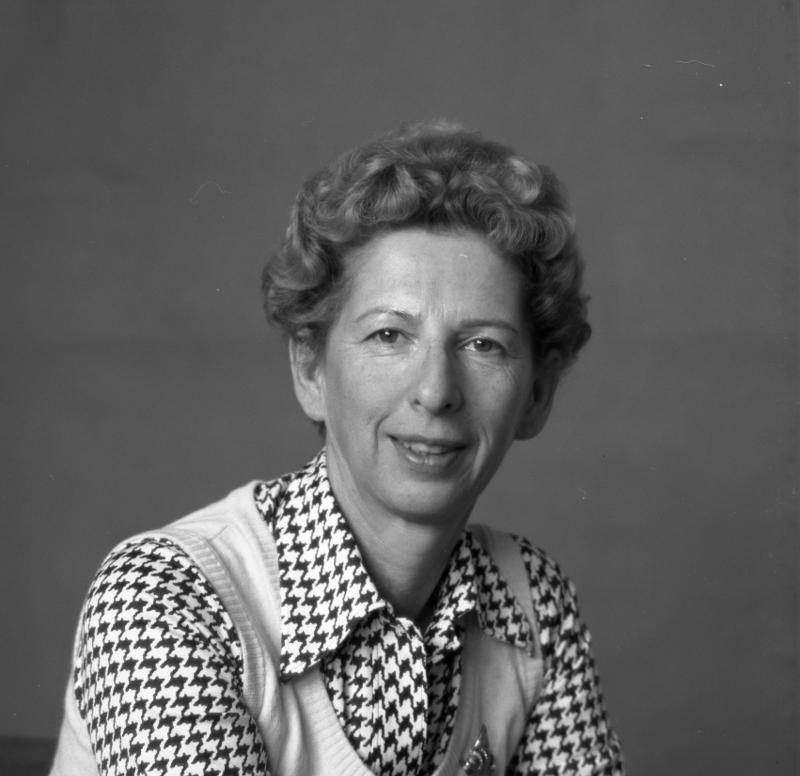
- Niemeyer in 1977

Justice of the Federal Constitutional Court of Germany
- In office 2 November 1977 – 28 November 1989

Personal details
- Born: 25 September 1923; Gdańsk
- Died: 7 February 2012 (aged 88); Bonn, Germany

Gisela Niemeyer (25 September 1923 – 7 February 2012) was a German judge. She was a judge of the Federal Fiscal Court and the Federal Constitutional Court. She was the first woman to take over the presidency of a German finance court.

== Biography ==
Gisela Niemeyer was born in Gdańsk, Poland, on 25 September 1923. In 1942 she passed her Abitur. In 1948 she enrolled at the University of Kiel to study law. She received her Ph.D. in 1956 and wrote her doctoral thesis on The subject matter of the procedure for contesting tax assessments. In the same year, she passed the second legal state examination. In 1957, she started her professional career as a department head at the tax office in Bonn, and worked until 1964. She later began a new career as a teacher at the state financial school of North Rhine-Westphalia.

In 1966 she was appointed as a judge at the Düsseldorf Finance Court. She subsequently became the presiding judge of the 6th Senate of the Düsseldorf Finance Court in 1971. In 1972 she was made as a judge at the Federal Finance Court in Munich. In August 1977 she was elected as the President of the Finance Court in Düsseldorf. She became the first woman to preside over a finance court in Germany.

She was later appointed as a judge at the Federal Constitutional Court (First Senate) in Karlsruhe on 2 November 1977, and held this office until her retirement on 28 November 1989. As a family law rapporteur, she adjudicated large number of family cases.

She died in Bonn on 7 February 2012.
