= Erna Scheffler =

German judge

Justice of the Federal Constitutional Court of Germany
- In office 7 September 1951 – 31 August 1963

Personal details
- Born: Erna Friedenthal; 21 September 1893 Breslau, German Empire
- Died: 22 May 1983 (aged 89) London, United Kingdom

Erna Scheffler (born Friedental and later Haßlacher; 21 September 1893 – 22 May 1983) was a German senior judge.

== Education and early career ==
Erna Scheffler was born Erna Friedenthal in Breslau (today Wrocław, Poland) on 21 September 1893. She attended the girls' schools in Legnica and Wrocław and gained her baccalaureate in Racibórz in 1911. She studied for a semester at Heidelberg University and then switched from medicine to law in Wrocław, Munich and Berlin. In December 1914 she finished her studies with a doctorate from Wrocław. Women were not yet permitted to take the state legal exams, so she initially worked in social welfare and then as an assistant at a law practice. She married for the first time in 1916, and lived in Belgium until 1918, where her husband, Fritz Haslacher worked as a lawyer in the German civil administration of occupied Belgium; she also worked as an auxiliary officer there. After the war ended, she found employment with the Association of German Architects (Bund Deutscher Architekten) and various law firms.

Women were allowed to take the German law exams in 1921, and Scheffler became a clerk in 1922. Between then and 1925, when she graduated as a full lawyer, she divorced her first husband. From late 1925 to 1928 she was a lawyer in the Berlin district courts I to III, and in the district court of Berlin-Mitte. From 1932 she was a permanent relief worker at the Berlin-Mitte district court.

== Nazi Germany ==
In November 1933, she was found to be "non-Aryan" and received an employment ban that was backdated to 1 March 1933. She received only a small pension. Her second marriage, to George Scheffler, was denied in 1934 because she was Halbjüdin (half-Jewish). She worked as an accountant in a friend's business and distributed food during the war. From January 1945 until the end of the war, she hid in a Gartenhäuschen (little garden house) outside Berlin. The second marriage with Kammergerichtsrat Georg Scheffler was forbidden in May 1934 because she was "half-Jewish". Nevertheless, the two (almost) lived together. She worked as a bookkeeper in a friend's business and distributed ration cards in her residential district during the war. From January 1945 until the end of the war, she hid in a garden allotment outside Berlin.

== After the war ==
Immediately after the war she married George Scheffler and returned to judicial duties in May 1945, first as Regional Councillor and later as Regional Director of the Landgericht Berlin (Regional Court of Berlin) in the Justice Service. After the 1948 currency reform, she became a Councillor in 1949 in the Düsseldorf Verwaltungsgericht (Administrative Court of Düsseldorf). On the German "Judges' Day" in 1950, she gave an address about equality between men and women, and was thus recommended as a Federal Judge. She was appointed on 7 September 1951, the only woman in the German Federal Constitutional Court in Karlsruhe, serving as a judge there until 1963 when her third term ended. Thereafter, she was an expert for the Interior Committee of the German Bundestag.

Erna Scheffler died on 22 May 1983 at her daughter's house in London.

== Legal opinions ==
The judge's writings and opinions were noted especially for their family and gender equality principles. She wrote for the equality in the family unit of the man and the woman (BVerfGE 3, 225), by which Article 6 and Article 3, paragraph 2 GG to were used for the first time, and which are still quoted. The abolition of the paternal random decision in family law (BVerfGE | 10, 59), the abolition of discrimination against women in the agricultural farms Law (BVerfGE 15, 337) and decisions on equality in social security law (BVerfGE 17, 1, 38, 62) have been decisively influenced by her pronouncements.

After stepping down, she continued to serve as a member of the Permanent Deputation of German Jurists, and in numerous international women's and gender politically oriented associations.

== Published works ==
- Friedenthal [Scheffler], Erna (1915). Straftilgende Maßnahmen (in German). Breslau. OCLC 720781675.
- Scheffler, Erna (1970). Die Stellung der Frau in Familie und Gesellschaft im Wandel der Rechtsordnung seit 1918 (in German). Frankfurt: Metzner. ISBN 978-3-7875-5204-7.
