= Klaus Winter =

German judge

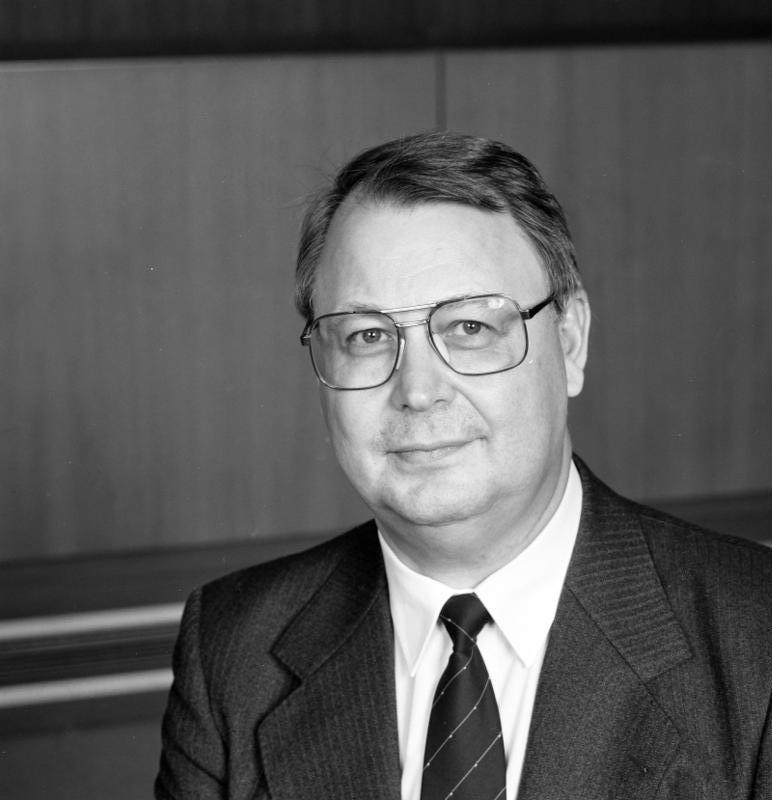
- Klaus Winter in 1989

Justice of the Federal Constitutional Court of Germany
- In office 28 November 1989 – 10 October 2000

Klaus Winter (29 May 1936 in Essen – 10 October 2000) was a German judge. He studied legal science in Frankfurt. He was a justice of the Federal Constitutional Court of Germany.
