= Jürgen Kühling =

German judge (1934–2019)

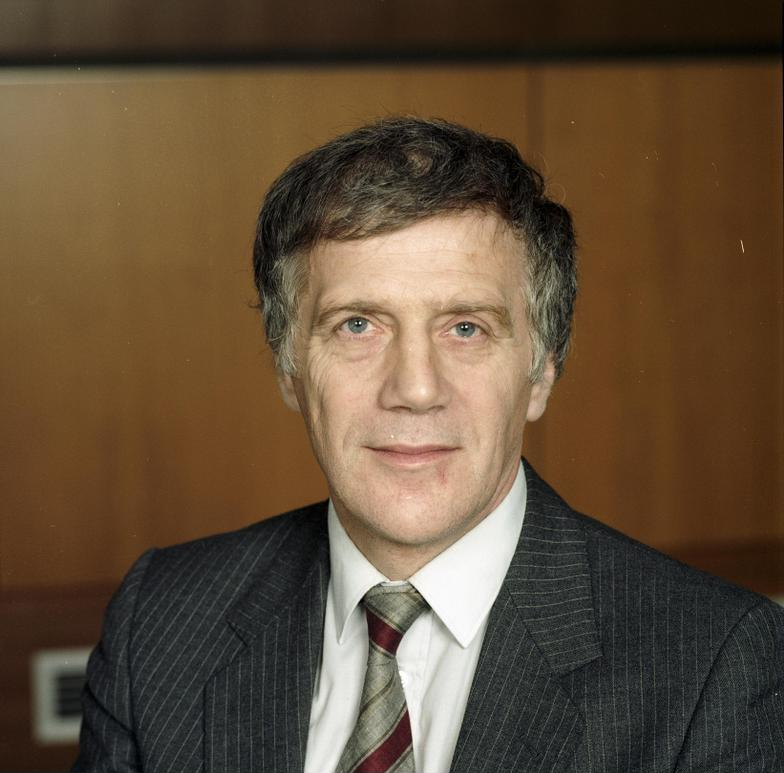
- Jürgen Kühling in 1989

Justice of the Federal Constitutional Court of Germany
- In office 12 July 1989 – 23 January 2001

Jürgen Kühling (27 April 1934 – 16 December 2019) was a German judge, born in Osnabrück. He was a judge in the Federal Constitutional Court of Germany between 1989 and 2001.
