= Gebhard Müller =

German lawyer and politician

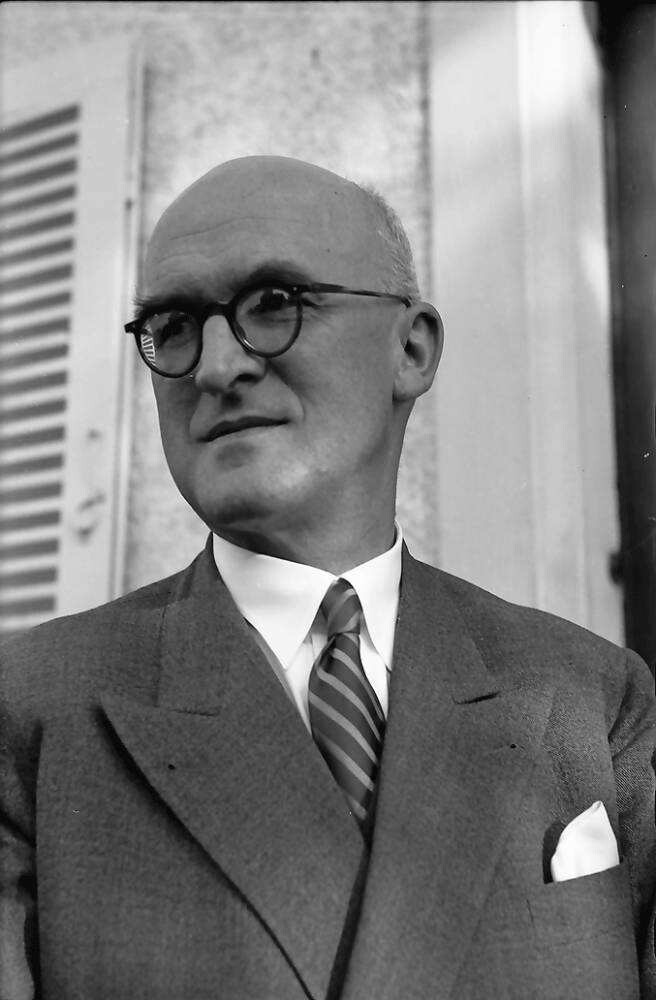
- Müller in 1953

3rd President of the Federal Constitutional Court of Germany
- In office 8 January 1959 – 8 December 1971
- Vice President: Rudolf Katz; Friedrich Wilhelm Wagner; Walter Seuffert
- Preceded by: Josef Wintrich
- Succeeded by: Ernst Benda

Minister-President of Baden-Württemberg
- In office 30 September 1953 – 9 December 1958
- Deputy: Hermann Veit
- Preceded by: Reinhold Maier
- Succeeded by: Kurt Georg Kiesinger

Member of the Bundestag; for Balingen
- In office 6 October 1953 – 11 November 1953
- Preceded by: Franz Weiß
- Succeeded by: Albert Wolf

Minister-President of Württemberg-Hohenzollern
- In office 13 August 1948 – 25 April 1952
- Preceded by: Lorenz Bock; Carlo Schmid (acting)
- Succeeded by: Reinhold Maier (as Minister-President of Baden-Württemberg)

Personal details
- Born: 17 April 1900 Füramoos, Kingdom of Württemberg, Germany
- Died: 7 August 1990 (aged 90) Stuttgart, West Germany
- Party: Christian Democratic Union
- Education: University of Tübingen

Gebhard Müller (17 April 1900 – 7 August 1990) was a German lawyer and politician (CDU). He was President of Württemberg-Hohenzollern (1948–1952), Minister President of Baden-Württemberg (1953–1958) and President of the Federal Constitutional Court of Germany (1959-1971). He was born in Füramoos and died in Stuttgart.

== Early life ==
Gebhard Müller was the fifth child of a teacher from Oberschwaben and lived in his birthplace Füramoos until 1906, from then in his father's new place of work Ludwigsburg. He attended the Catholic elementary school in Ludwigsburg and later the Gymnasium in Rottweil. In the last year of World War I he was drafted and served in the Ludwigsburg barracks without having to march out. In 1919 Müller started studying theology, history and philosophy at the University of Tübingen. He later switched to law and political science and passed his doctoral degree exam in the latter.

== Career ==
Müller served as a legal clerk at the local district court in Ludwigsburg, the regional court and the Office of Public Prosecutor in Stuttgart, at the Oberamt Ludwigsburg and at a law firm.

=== Legal and military service ===
In June 1929 he served as deputy judge of local court in Stuttgart and Tübingen, prior to an intermittent leave of absence from civil service, which allowed him, from 1930 to 1933, to work as a tax consultant to the administration of the diocese of Rottenburg. In 1933, Müller returned to the civil service and served as judge of local courts in different Württemberg towns. Although he never became a member of the Nazi Party, he joined a number of Nazi organizations, such as the Association of German National Socialist legal Professionals.

On 9 November 1938 the so-called Kristallnacht, Müller filed charges against a Landrat (district chief executive), who had refused fire brigade operation at the burning Göppingen synagoge, he was transferred to the Stuttgart district court. Shortly before the start of World War II Müller was drafted and took part in the campaign in France as a camp office clerk.

=== Political career and head of the Constitutional Court ===
After the war, Müller became the leader of the CDU in the provisional state of Württemberg-Hohenzollern in 1947, and soon won a seat to the assembly, situated in Bebenhausen Abbey. He thus came to head the state government from 1948, as the CDU dominated the elections in 1946 (with 42 seats out of 68).

As Minister President, Müller signed the last death warrant executed in Germany (other than in East Germany and West Berlin, which had its own legal framework) of murderer Richard Schuh, who was beheaded on 18 February 1949. Müller, a proponent of capital punishment, did not relent even as the constitution of Germany enacted later the same year outlawed capital punishment in the entire federal republic. The penalty remained formally on the books in the state for years after.

Upon the joining of Baden and Württemberg into the significantly larger state of Baden-Württemberg in 1952, Müller's CDU became the predominant party and he replaced liberal Reinhold Maier as the Minister President. Müller retained this post until he returned to his legal career as he was appointed to head the Federal Constitutional Court, now placed relatively close in Karlsruhe. He kept this office for a full tenure of 12 years and subsequently retired. He lived long enough to witness the collapse of the Berlin Wall in 1989, dying barely two months before reunification in 1990.
