= Winfried Hassemer =

German criminal law scholar

11th Vice-president of the Federal Constitutional Court of Germany
- In office 10 April 2002 – 7 May 2008
- Preceded by: Hans-Jürgen Papier
- Succeeded by: Andreas Voßkuhle

Justice of the Federal Constitutional Court of Germany
- In office 3 May 1996 – 7 May 2008

Personal details
- Born: 17 February 1940 Gau-Algesheim, Germany
- Died: 9 January 2014 (aged 73)
- Education: Saarland University

Winfried Hassemer (17 February 1940 – 9 January 2014) was a German criminal law scholar. He was vice president of the Federal Constitutional Court.

Born in Gau-Algesheim, Hassemer was from 1964 to 1969 a scientific assistant at the Institut for laws and social philosophy of the university of Saarland. His widow Kristiane Weber Hassemer was a judge and state secretary to Rupert von Plottnitz. His brother Volker Hassemer was a senator in Berlin.
