= Hermann Höpker-Aschoff =

German politician (1883–1954)

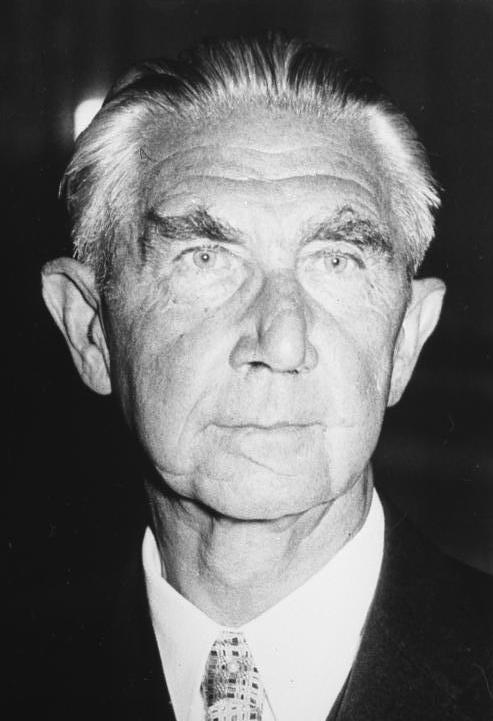

1st President of the Federal Constitutional Court of Germany
- In office 7 September 1951 – 15 January 1954
- Preceded by: Position established
- Succeeded by: Josef Wintrich

Personal details
- Born: 31 January 1883 Herford, Province of Westphalia, German Empire
- Died: 15 January 1954 (aged 70) Karlsruhe, Baden-Württemberg, West Germany
- Party: DDP (pre-WWII), FDP (post-WWII)
- Education: University of Jena

Hermann Höpker-Aschoff (31 January 1883 – 15 January 1954) was a German politician, finance minister, a member of Parlamentarischer Rat and a jurist. He was the first President of the Federal Constitutional Court of Germany.

Höpker-Aschoff studied law and economics in Jena, Munich and Bonn. He taught monetary theory and finance as professor at the University of Bonn.
