= Josef Wintrich =

German legal scholar and judge (1891–1958)

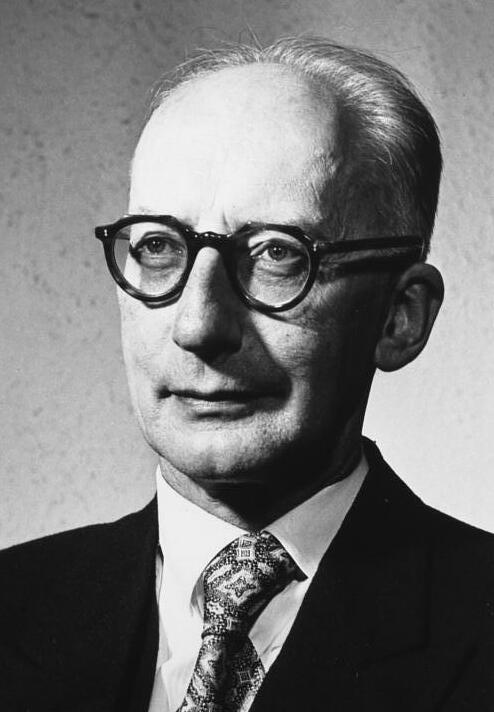

2nd President of the Federal Constitutional Court of Germany
- In office 23 March 1954 – 19 October 1958
- Preceded by: Hermann Höpker-Aschoff
- Succeeded by: Gebhard Müller

Personal details
- Born: 15 February 1891 Munich, Germany
- Died: 19 October 1958 (aged 67) Ebersberg, Germany
- Education: Ludwig-Maximilians-Universität München

Josef Marquard Wintrich (15 February 1891 – 19 October 1958) was a German legal scholar and judge. From 1910 to 1915, he studied legal science at the Ludwig-Maximilians-Universität München. He served as the 2nd president of the Federal Constitutional Court of Germany from 1954 to 1956. The most significant decision during his tenure was the banning of the Communist Party of Germany in 1956.
