= Stadium ban decision =

German Federal Constitutional Court decision

The Stadionverbots-Entscheidung (Beschl. v. 11.04.2018, Az. 1 BvR 3080/09) (lit. 'Stadium ban decision' in German; also known as the Stadionverbots-Beschluss) is a 2018 decision by the Bundesverfassungsgericht, the German federal constitutional court, in which a football fan unsuccessfully attempted to have his ban from German stadiums declared to be unlawful retroactively. The fan received a two-year nationwide ban from football stadiums in 2006 after allegedly taking part in an incident with other fans. The court set a higher standard for banning a fan from all stadiums for alleged misconduct, declaring some applicability of mittelbare Drittwirkung, "the doctrine of the indirect horizontal effects of fundamental rights", a legal concept unique to European jurisprudence in regards to procedural rights and equality to their treatment of fans. As long as there is a reasonable concern about future disruption, general bans are still permitted even if the subject is not proven to have committed a crime. The decision impacted how other actions of structurally powerful companies, particularly social media companies, are evaluated.

== Legal proceedings ==
The constitutional complaint was filed by a fan of FC Bayern Munich and member of the Ultras, who at the age of 16 visited the club's football game against MSV Duisburg in 2006. At the game, he was alleged to have been part of a verbal and physical confrontation with fans of the other club and was among the around 50 people arrested. The criminal complaint for breach of the peace was discontinued by the prosecutor as being insignificant. Nevertheless, FC Bayern Munich voided his club membership and his season tickets. Additionally, at the suggestion of the local police force, MSV Duisburg issued a stadium ban, which prohibited him from entering any football stadium in the country until 2008, without allowing the fan to be heard by the decision-making body.

The suit began with the goal of having the original decision lifted and continued afterward with the desire to have the actions retroactively found illegal. The lower courts denied the claim, and the Bundesgerichtshof found that the organization may not act arbitrarily and needed to respect basic rights insofar as they were included within civil law. They may base their decision on future risk (based on past conduct) even without a criminal conviction, as was the case here.

The fan claimed that the lower courts did not sufficiently consider the Drittwirkung of Article 3(1) and Article 2(1) of the German Basic Law (GG), which led to his Verfassungsbeschwerde (constitutional complaint) being accepted. While the complaint was accepted, the fan ultimately did not succeed before the court.

Being the first time that the court considered such a case of Article 3(1) GG, the court affirmed that there is no general requirement to be non-discriminatory within private business relationships. Therefore, there is no general Kontrahierungszwang, a requirement to enter a contract against your will. According to the decision, a stadium ban per se would not trigger the requirements for equality; however, the impact of this ban, which was enacted nationwide due to cooperation between the clubs, did ("spezifische Konstellation"). Therefore, the lower courts have to apply standards derived from administrative law to such private actors, leading to claims that they are now partially obligated to respect fundamental rights in the same way the state is.

== Impact ==
The ruling altered the requirements for equality for access to public events. The decision, which was made by the full senate, which only rules jointly every few years, confirmed the applicability of the Drittwirkung to this type of case, mandating an explanation and justification and that the affected person must be heard. Robert Golz, an attorney specializing in sport and media law, argued that the significance of the ruling may apply to a variety of similar situations, such as the exclusion of critical journalists from press conferences or the exclusion of users from social media platforms without an adequate reason.

In particular, this decision, combined with other decisions, means that large and structurally powerful social media companies such as Facebook do not have a general right to delete legal content arbitrarily but must instead respect procedural rights and the principle of equality, particularly providing the user with an explanation for the action and the right to be heard, if the company is not selective about their users and has a large impact on social life.
