= Hans-Jürgen Papier =

German scholar of constitutional law

- Hans-Jürgen Papier at the Frankfurt Book Fair 2026

8th President of the Federal Constitutional Court of Germany
- In office 10 April 2002 – 16 March 2010
- Preceded by: Jutta Limbach
- Succeeded by: Andreas Voßkuhle

10th Vice-president of the Federal Constitutional Court of Germany
- In office 27 February 1998 – 10 April 2002
- Preceded by: Otto Seidl
- Succeeded by: Winfried Hassemer

Personal details
- Born: 6 July 1943 (age 83) Berlin, Germany
- Education: Free University of Berlin

Hans-Jürgen Papier (German pronunciation: [ˈpaːpi̯ɐ]; born 6 July 1943 in Berlin) is a German scholar of constitutional law who served as president of the Federal Constitutional Court of Germany from 2002 to 2010.

== Early life and education ==
Three years after graduating from law school in 1967 with the first law state examination, Papier completed his Ph.D. studies at the Freie Universität Berlin. In 1971, he received the second law state examination. In 1973, he received his Habilitation on the basis of a second dissertation on questions concerning German constitutional law.

== Career ==
From 1974 onward, Papier received tenure at Bielefeld University and taught constitutional law. In 1992, he moved to Munich to teach German and Bavarian constitutional and administrative law as well as Public Social law at LMU Munich.

In 1998, Papier, a member of the conservative CSU party, became Vice President and Chair of the First Senate of the Federal Constitutional Court of Germany. When President of the Federal Constitutional Court of Germany Jutta Limbach retired from her position in 2002, Papier succeeded her.

Papier has often made public comments on questions of constitutional law, but has generally avoided commenting on other political questions. He made an exception to this rule after the elections of 2005 when he implored the parties to work hard not to lose the trust of the German electorate.

== Later career ==
From 2014 to 2016, Papier was part of an advisory board on internal reforms at Europe's largest automobile association ADAC. From 2014 to 2023, he served as ombudsperson at German private credit bureau Schufa.

From 2017, Papier headed the so-called Limbach Commission (Advisory Commission on the return of cultural property seized as a result of Nazi persecution, especially Jewish property), a panel convened by the German government to give recommendations on restitution claims regarding art works stolen or purchased under duress by the Nazis.

== Selected works ==
- Verfassung und Verfassungswandel, in: Robertson-von Trotha, Caroline Y. (ed.): 60 Jahre Grundgesetz. Interdisziplinäre Perspektiven (= Kulturwissenschaft interdisziplinär/Interdisciplinary Studies on Culture and Society, Vol. 4), Baden-Baden 2009
