= Christine Langenfeld =

German judge

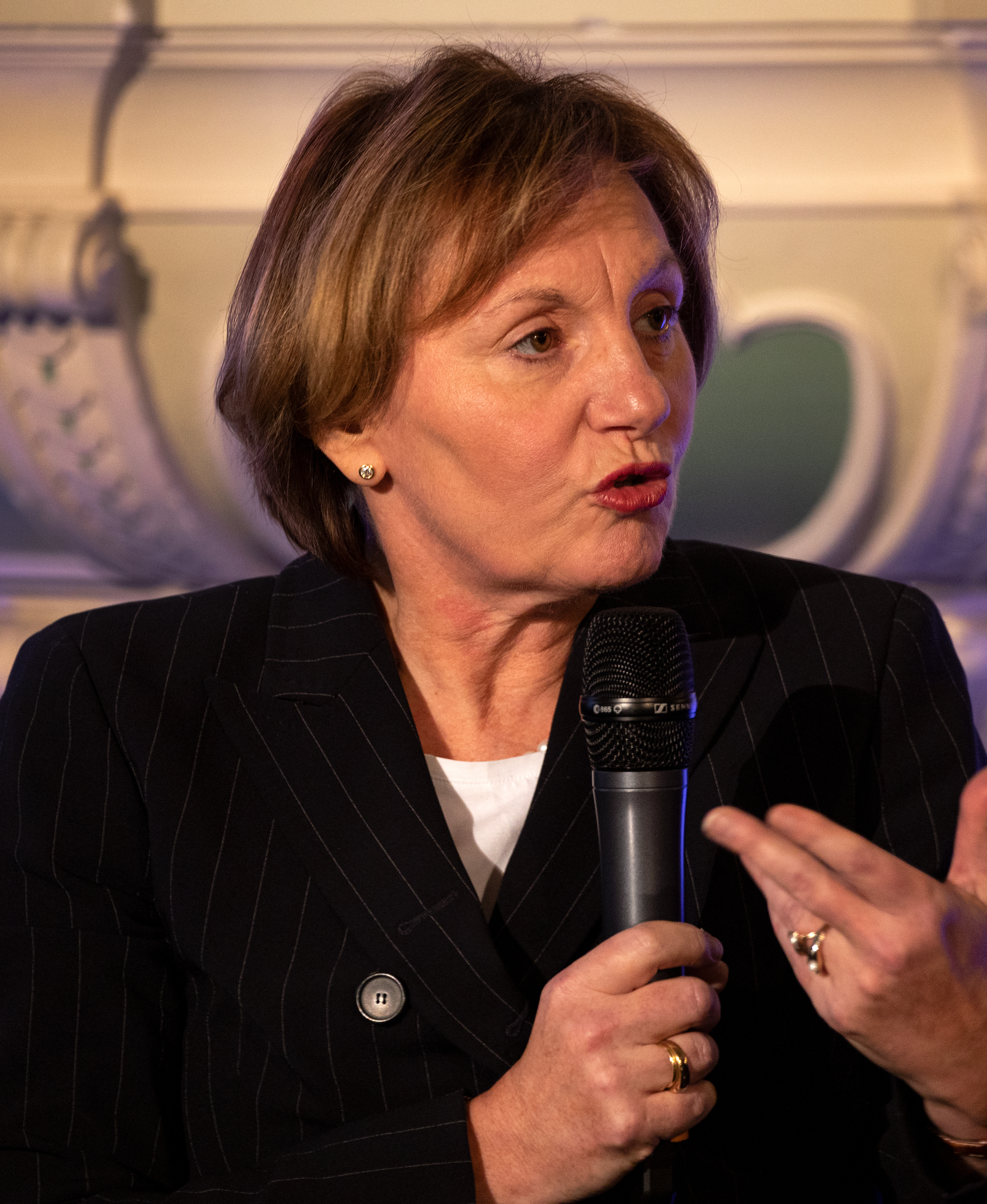
- Langenfeld in 2019

Justice of the Federal Constitutional Court of Germany
- Incumbent
- Assumed office 20 July 2016
- Nominated by: CDU/CSU
- Preceded by: Herbert Landau

Personal details
- Born: Christine Wagner; 16 August 1962 (age 64) Luxembourg
- Spouse: Harald Langenfeld
- Parent: Carl-Ludwig Wagner
- Education: University of Burgundy; University of Mainz; University of Trier

Christine Langenfeld (born 16 August 1962) is a German jurist who is currently serving as a judge in the Federal Constitutional Court in the second senate.

== Early life and education ==
Langenfeld was born in Luxembourg to late Carl-Ludwig Wagner. From 1980 to 1986, she studied each for a 2-year term, Jurisprudence at the University of Trier, University of Burgundy and University of Mainz. In 1986, she finished her first Staatsexam in Mainz. Langenfeld became a Research assistant for Public law and European Union law at the University of Mainz for Dr. Eckart Klein from 1986 to 1987. She finished her second Staatsexam in 1991.

== Career ==
Langenfeld was nominated by the German Bundesrat as a justice for the second senate of the Federal Constitutional Court of Germany in 2016 and is currently serving a 12-year term until 2028.

== Other activities ==
- Max Planck Institute for the Study of Crime, Security and Law, Member of the Board of Trustees

== Personal life ==
Langenfeld is married to Harald Langenfeld with whom she has a daughter and resides in Leipzig.
