= List of justices of the Federal Constitutional Court =

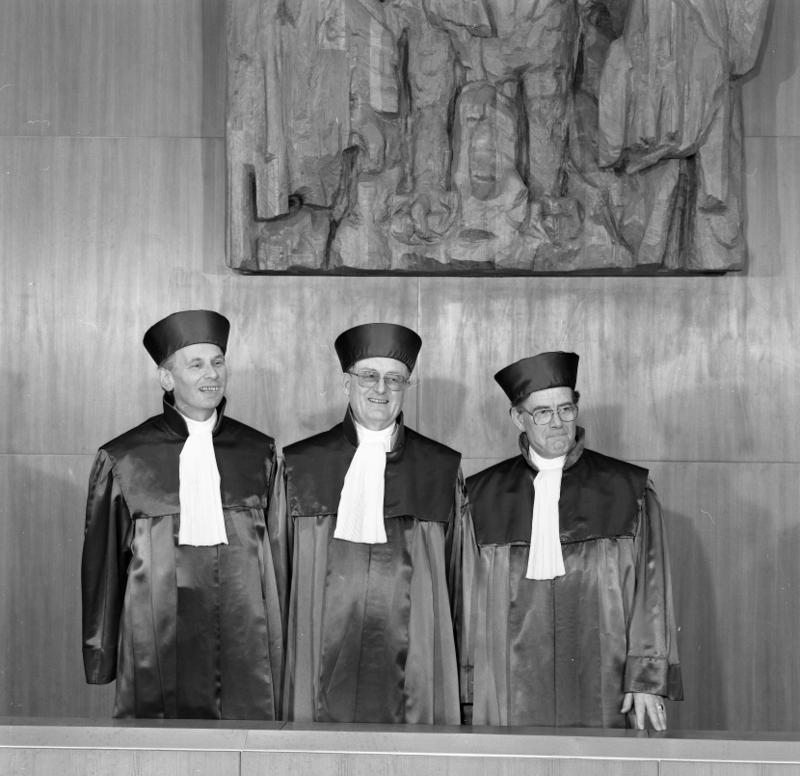
Dieter Grimm, Hermann Heußner and Ernst-Wolfgang Böckenförde in 1989

The Federal Constitutional Court (German: Bundesverfassungsgericht, usually abbreviated BVerfG) is the federal constitutional court of Germany. It is the highest independent constitutional organ of the German judiciary, ranking equally with the other supreme federal courts, and is – at the same time – the highest federal court in Germany.

As of December 2025, 16 justices serve on the two senates of the court. This article lists the current justices and the former presidents, vice-presidents and all former justices.

== Current justices of the Federal Constitutional Court ==
The court is divided into two senates, each with different subject-matter jurisdiction. The court's two senates were originally staffed with twelve justices each. With effect from 1963, the number of justices per senate was reduced to eight.

The eight justices per senate include the president and the vice-president of the Federal Constitutional Court, who each preside over one of the court's two senates.

=== First senate ===
Eight justices currently serve on the first senate of the Federal Constitutional Court. Listed in order of seniority, they are (if the tenure length is identical they are listed in alphabetical order):

Justice		Position (seat)	Tenure (as justice)	Tenure length (as justice)	Electoral body	Proposal	Ref.
1	Stephan Harbarth (born 1971)	President; Presiding Justice of the First Senate (1 BT 4.7)	30 November 2018 – Incumbent	7 years, 204 days	Bundestag	CDU/CSU	
2	Yvonne Ott (born 1963)	Justice (1 BR 2.8)	8 November 2016 – Incumbent	9 years, 226 days	Bundesrat	SPD	
3	Henning Radtke (born 1962)	Justice (1 BR 1.6)	16 July 2018 – Incumbent	7 years, 341 days	Bundesrat	CDU/CSU	
4	Ines Härtel (born 1972)	Justice (1 BR 4.6)	10 July 2020 – Incumbent	5 years, 347 days	Bundesrat	SPD	
5	Heinrich Amadeus Wolff (born 1965)	Justice (1 BT 2.8)	3 June 2022 – Incumbent	4 years, 19 days	Bundestag	FDP	
6	Martin Eifert (born 1965)	Justice (1 BT 3.7)	20 February 2023 – Incumbent	3 years, 122 days	Bundestag	Alliance 90/The Greens	
7	Miriam Meßling (born 1973)	Justice (1 BR 3.7)	17 April 2023 – Incumbent	3 years, 66 days	Bundesrat	SPD	
8	Günter Spinner (born 1972)	Justice (1 BT 1.9)	7 October 2025 – Incumbent	258 days	Bundestag	CDU/CSU	

=== Second senate ===
Eight justices currently serve on the second senate of the Federal Constitutional Court. Listed in order of seniority, they are (if the tenure length is identical they are listed in alphabetical order):

Justice		Position (seat)	Tenure (as justice)	Tenure length (as justice)	Electoral body	Proposal	Ref.
1	Ann-Katrin Kaufhold (born 1976)	Vice-President; Presiding Justice of the Second Senate (2 BT 1.7)	7 October 2025 – Incumbent	258 days	Bundestag	SPD	
2	Christine Langenfeld (born 1958)	Justice (2 BR 3.7)	20 July 2016 – Incumbent	9 years, 337 days	Bundesrat	CDU/CSU	
3	Astrid Wallrabenstein (born 1969)	Justice (2 BR 4.8)	22 June 2020 – Incumbent	6 years, 0 days	Bundesrat	Alliance 90/The Greens	
4	Rhona Fetzer (born 1963)	Justice (2 BT 2.6)	11 January 2023 – Incumbent	3 years, 162 days	Bundestag	SPD	
5	Thomas Offenloch (born 1972)	Justice (2 BT 3.7)	11 January 2023 – Incumbent	3 years, 162 days	Bundestag	FDP	
6	Peter Frank (born 1968)	Justice (2 BR 1.8)	21 December 2023 – Incumbent	2 years, 183 days	Bundesrat	CDU/CSU	
7	Holger Wöckel (born 1976)	Justice (2 BR 2.6)	21 December 2023 – Incumbent	2 years, 183 days	Bundesrat	CDU/CSU	
8	Sigrid Emmenegger (born 1976)	Justice (2 BT 4.7)	21 December 2023 – Incumbent	258 days	Bundestag	SPD	

== Presidents of the Federal Constitutional Court ==
The president of the Federal Constitutional Court is elected alternately by the Bundestag and the Bundesrat in accordance with Section 9 of the Bundesverfassungsgerichtsgesetz, and is appointed by the President of Germany in accordance with Section 10 of the Bundesverfassungsgerichtsgesetz.

To date, 10 persons have served as president of the Federal Constitutional Court. In chronological order, they are:

President		Senate	Tenure (as justice)	Tenure (as president)	Tenure length (as president)	Proposal	Ref.
1	Hermann Höpker-Aschoff (1883–1954)	First Senate	7 September 1951 – 15 January 1954 (Died)	7 September 1951 – 15 January 1954 (Died)	2 years, 130 days	FDP	
2	Josef Wintrich (1891–1958)	First Senate	23 March 1954 – 19 October 1958 (Died)	23 March 1954 – 19 October 1958 (Died)	4 years, 210 days	CDU/CSU	
3	Gebhard Müller (1900–1990)	First Senate	8 January 1959 – 8 December 1971	8 January 1959 – 8 December 1971	12 years, 334 days	CDU/CSU	
4	Ernst Benda (1925–2009)	First Senate	8 December 1971 – 20 December 1983	8 December 1971 – 20 December 1983	12 years, 12 days	CDU/CSU	
5	Wolfgang Zeidler (1924–1987)	First Senate (1967–1970) Second Senate (1975–1987)	11 August 1967 – 31 May 1970 (First Term) 7 November 1975 – 16 November 1987 (Second Term)	20 December 1983 – 16 November 1987	3 years, 331 days	SPD	
6	Roman Herzog (1934–2017)	First Senate	20 December 1983 – 30 June 1994	16 November 1987 – 30 June 1994	6 years, 226 days	CDU/CSU	
7	Jutta Limbach (1934–2016)	Second Senate	24 March 1994 – 10 April 2002	14 September 1994 – 10 April 2002	7 years, 208 days	SPD	
8	Hans-Jürgen Papier (born 1943)	First Senate	27 February 1998 – 16 March 2010	10 April 2002 – 16 March 2010	7 years, 340 days	CDU/CSU	
9	Andreas Voßkuhle (born 1963)	Second Senate	7 May 2008 – 22 June 2020	16 March 2010 – 22 June 2020	10 years, 98 days	SPD	
10	Stephan Harbarth (born 1971)	First Senate	30 November 2018 – Incumbent	22 June 2020 – Incumbent	6 years, 0 days	CDU/CSU	

== Vice-presidents of the Federal Constitutional Court ==
The vice-president of the Federal Constitutional Court is elected alternately by the Bundestag and the Bundesrat in accordance with Section 9 of the Bundesverfassungsgerichtsgesetz, and is appointed by the President of Germany in accordance with Section 10 of the Bundesverfassungsgerichtsgesetz.

To date, 16 persons have served as vice-president of the Federal Constitutional Court. Listed in chronological order, they are:

Vice-President		Senate	Tenure (as justice)	Tenure (as vice-president)	Tenure length (as vice-president)	Proposal	Ref.
1	Rudolf Katz (1895–1961)	Second Senate	7 September 1951 – 23 July 1961 (Died)	7 September 1951 – 23 July 1961 (Died)	9 years, 319 days	SPD	
2	Friedrich Wilhelm Wagner (1894–1971)	Second Senate	19 December 1961 – 18 October 1967	19 December 1961 – 18 October 1967	5 years, 303 days	SPD	
3	Walter Seuffert (1907–1989)	Second Senate	18 October 1967 – 7 November 1975	18 October 1967 – 7 November 1975	8 years, 20 days	SPD	
4	Wolfgang Zeidler (1924–1987)	First Senate (1967–1970) Second Senate (1975–1987)	11 August 1967 – 31 May 1970 (First Term) 7 November 1975 – 16 November 1987 (Second Term)	7 November 1975 – 20 December 1983	8 years, 43 days	SPD	
5	Roman Herzog (1934–2017)	First Senate	20 December 1983 – 30 June 1994	20 December 1983 – 16 November 1987	3 years, 331 days	CDU/CSU	
6	Ernst Gottfried Mahrenholz (1929–2021)	Second Senate	6 July 1981 – 24 March 1994	16 November 1987 – 24 March 1994	6 years, 128 days	SPD	
7	Jutta Limbach (1934–2016)	Second Senate	24 March 1994 – 10 April 2002	24 March 1994 – 14 September 1994	174 days	SPD	
8	Johann Friedrich Henschel (1931–2007)	First Senate	19 July 1983 – 13 October 1995	29 September 1994 – 13 October 1995	1 year, 14 days	FDP	
9	Otto Seidl (1931–2022)	First Senate	10 June 1986 – 27 February 1998	13 October 1995 – 27 February 1998	2 years, 137 days	CDU/CSU	
10	Hans-Jürgen Papier (born 1943)	First Senate	27 February 1998 – 16 March 2010	27 February 1998 – 10 April 2002	4 years, 42 days	CDU/CSU	
11	Winfried Hassemer (1940–2014)	Second Senate	3 May 1996 – 7 May 2008	10 April 2002 – 7 May 2008	6 years, 47 days	SPD	
12	Andreas Voßkuhle (born 1963)	Second Senate	7 May 2008 – 22 June 2020	7 May 2008 – 16 March 2010	1 year, 313 days	SPD	
13	Ferdinand Kirchhof (born 1950)	First Senate	1 October 2007 – 30 November 2018	16 March 2010 – 30 November 2018	8 years, 259 days	CDU/CSU	
14	Stephan Harbarth (born 1971)	First Senate	30 November 2018 – Incumbent	30 November 2018 – 22 June 2020	1 year, 205 days	CDU/CSU	
15	Doris König (born 1957)	Second Senate	2 June 2014 – 7 October 2025	22 June 2020 – 7 October 2025	5 years, 107 days	SPD	
16	Ann-Katrin Kaufhold (born 1976)	Second Senate	7 October 2025 – Incumbent	7 October 2025 – Incumbent	258 days	SPD	

== Justices of the Federal Constitutional Court ==
Since the establishment of the Federal Constitutional Court in 1951, 121 justices (including presidents and vice-presidents) have served on the court. The shortest tenure on the court lasted only 133 days (Claus Leusser), while the longest serving member of the court served for 26 years and 56 days (Willi Geiger).

The court's justices are elected by the Bundestag and the Bundesrat, and are appointed by the President of Germany. According to Article 93(2) of the German Basic Law, both legislative bodies elect half of the members of the two senates. The election procedure is contained in Sections 5 and 6 of the Bundesverfassungsgerichtsgesetz. Beginning with the election of Josef Christ in 2017, the justices that are to be elected by the Bundestag are elected by the Bundestag itself and no longer by the election committee (Wahlausschuss) of the Bundestag.

The 121 justices are listed below in chronological order. If the date of their assumption of office – their appointment – is identical, the lower seat number is decisive for the purposes of this list.

Justice (Note: States the name of the justice. In brackets, the year of birth for justices who are still alive, and the year of birth and death for justices, who are deceased, are given.)		Position (seat) (Note: The office of the justice is listed (i.e. president, vice-president or justice). In brackets the seat number is provided: It is composed of the number of the Senate (1 or 2), the electoral body (Bundestag [BT] or Bundesrat [BR]), the respective seat of the justice (1 to 6 [since 1963: 1 to 4]) and a number corresponding to the chronological occupancy of the seat. Example: The indication "1 BR 4.3" shows that the justice is the third to occupy the fourth seat of the group of justices elected by the Bundesrat to the first senate.)	Senate (Note: States on which senate the respective justice serves or has served.)	Tenure (as justice) (Note: The first date specifies the date on which the justice assumed their office (was appointed by the President of Germany). This date is not identical with the date of their election. The last date indicates the final day of the term of office of the justice. In case of sitting justices, they are marked as "Incumbent".)	Tenure length (as justice) (Note: States the length of time a justice is or was in office.)	Proposal (Note: States which German political party proposed the respective justice for their office.)	Ref.
1	Hermann Höpker-Aschoff (1883–1954)	President (1 BT 1.1)	First Senate	7 September 1951 – 15 January 1954 (Died)	2 years, 130 days	FDP	
2	Gerhard Heiland (1894–1961)	Justice (1 BT 3.1)	First Senate	7 September 1951 – 22 August 1961	9 years, 349 days	SPD	
3	Herbert Scholtissek (1900–1979)	Justice (1 BT 4.1)	First Senate	7 September 1951 – 31 August 1967	15 years, 358 days	CDU/CSU	
4	Konrad Zweigert (1900–1996)	Justice (1 BT 5.1)	First Senate	7 September 1951 – 11 October 1956	5 years, 34 days	SPD	
5	Joachim Lehmann (1909–1979)	Justice (1 BT 6.1)	First Senate	7 September 1951 – 31 August 1963	11 years, 358 days	SPD	
6	Erwin Stein (1903–1992)	Justice (1 BR 1.1)	First Senate	7 September 1951 – 8 December 1971	20 years, 92 days	SPD	
7	Franz Wessel (1903–1958)	Justice (1 BR 2.1)	First Senate	7 September 1951 – 11 September 1958 (Died)	7 years, 4 days	SPD	
8	Erna Scheffler (1893–1983)	Justice (1 BR 3.1)	First Senate	7 September 1951 – 31 August 1963	11 years, 358 days	SPD	
9	Theodor Ritterspach (1904–1999)	Justice (1 BR 4.1)	First Senate	7 September 1951 – 7 November 1975	24 years, 61 days	CDU/CSU	
10	Martin Drath (1902–1976)	Justice (1 BR 6.1)	First Senate	7 September 1951 – 31 August 1963	11 years, 358 days	SPD	
11	Hans Georg Rupp (1907–1989)	Justice (2 BT 1.1)	Second Senate	7 September 1951 – 7 November 1975	24 years, 61 days	SPD	
12	Anton Henneka (1900–1984)	Justice (2 BT 2.1)	Second Senate	7 September 1951 – 20 December 1968	17 years, 104 days	CDU/CSU	
13	Julius Federer (1911–1984)	Justice (2 BT 3.1)	Second Senate	7 September 1951 – 31 August 1967	15 years, 358 days	CDU/CSU	
14	Gerhard Leibholz (1901–1982)	Justice (2 BT 4.1)	Second Senate	7 September 1951 – 8 December 1971	20 years, 92 days	CDU/CSU	
15	Conrad Frederick Roediger (1887–1973)	Justice (2 BT 5.1)	Second Senate	7 September 1951 – 31 August 1956	4 years, 359 days	DP	
16	Walter Klaas (1895–1978)	Justice (2 BT 6.1)	Second Senate	7 September 1951 – 31 August 1963	11 years, 358 days	SPD	
17	Rudolf Katz (1895–1961)	Vice-President (2 BR 1.1)	Second Senate	7 September 1951 – 23 July 1961 (Died)	9 years, 319 days	SPD	
18	Willi Geiger (1909–1994)	Justice (2 BR 2.1)	Second Senate	7 September 1951 – 2 November 1977	26 years, 56 days	CDU/CSU	
19	Georg Fröhlich (1884–1971)	Justice (2 BR 3.1)	Second Senate	7 September 1951 – 31 August 1956	4 years, 359 days	CDU/CSU	
20	Claus Leusser (1909–1966)	Justice (2 BR 4.1)	Second Senate	7 September 1951 – 18 January 1952	133 days	CDU/CSU	
21	Bernhard Wolff (1886–1966)	Justice (2 BR 5.1)	Second Senate	7 September 1951 – 31 August 1956	4 years, 359 days	SPD	
22	Ernst Friesenhahn (1901–1984)	Justice (2 BR 6.1)	Second Senate	7 September 1951 – 31 August 1963	11 years, 358 days	CDU/CSU	
23	Kurt Zweigert (1886–1967)	Justice (1 BT 2.1)	First Senate	13 September 1951 – 14 February 1952	154 days	CDU/CSU	
24	Wilhelm Ellinghaus (1888–1961)	Justice (1 BR 5.1)	First Senate	13 September 1951 – 12 October 1955	4 years, 29 days	SPD	
25	Egon Schunck (1890–1981)	Justice (2 BR 4.2)	Second Senate	13 September 1952 – 31 August 1963	10 years, 352 days	CDU/CSU	
26	Josef Wintrich (1891–1958)	President (1 BT 1.2)	First Senate	23 March 1954 – 19 October 1958 (Died)	4 years, 210 days	CDU/CSU	
27	Karl Heck (1896–1997)	Justice (1 BT 2.2)	First Senate	2 April 1954 – 9 February 1965	10 years, 313 days	CDU/CSU	
28	Hans Kutscher (1911–1993)	Justice (1 BR 5.2) Justice (2 BR 3.2)	First Senate (1955–1956) Second Senate (1956–1970)	12 October 1955 – 31 August 1956 1 September 1956 – 25 October 1970 (on leave from 26 October 1970 until 31 August 1971)	15 years, 3 days	SPD	
29	Gebhard Müller (1900–1990)	President (1 BT 1.3)	First Senate	8 January 1959 – 8 December 1971	12 years, 334 days	CDU/CSU	
30	Hugo Berger (1900–1990)	Justice (1 BR 2.2)	First Senate	8 January 1959 – 11 August 1967	8 years, 215 days	SPD	
31	Friedrich Wilhelm Wagner (1894–1971)	Vice-President (2 BR 1.2)	Second Senate	19 December 1961 – 18 October 1967	5 years, 303 days	SPD	
32	Karl Haager (1911–2008)	Justice (1 BT 3.2)	First Senate	9 May 1962 – 7 May 1979	16 years, 363 days	SPD	
33	Wiltraut Rupp-von Brünneck (1912–1977)	Justice (1 BR 3.2)	First Senate	1 September 1963 – 18 August 1977 (Died)	13 years, 351 days	SPD	
34	Gregor Geller (1903–1988)	Justice (2 BR 4.3)	Second Senate	1 September 1963 – 8 December 1971	8 years, 98 days	CDU/CSU	
35	Werner Böhmer (1915–2014)	Justice (1 BT 2.3)	First Senate	10 February 1965 – 5 July 1983	18 years, 145 days	CDU/CSU	
36	Wolfgang Zeidler (1924–1987)	President (2 BT 1.2) (1983–1987) Vice-President (2 BT 1.2) (1975–1983) Justice (1 BR 2.3) (1967–1970)	First Senate (1967–1970) Second Senate (1975–1987)	11 August 1967 – 31 May 1970 (First Term) 7 November 1975 – 16 November 1987 (Second Term)	2 years, 293 days (First Term) 12 years, 9 days (Second Term)	SPD	
37	Hans Brox (1920–2009)	Justice (1 BT 4.2)	First Senate	1 September 1967 – 7 November 1975	8 years, 67 days	CDU/CSU	
38	Fabian von Schlabrendorff (1907–1980)	Justice (2 BT 3.2)	Second Senate	1 September 1967 – 7 November 1975	8 years, 67 days	CDU/CSU	
39	Walter Seuffert (1907–1989)	Vice-President (2 BR 1.3)	Second Senate	18 October 1967 – 7 November 1975	8 years, 20 days	SPD	
40	Hans-Justus Rinck (1918–1995)	Justice (2 BT 2.2)	Second Senate	20 December 1968 – 8 October 1986	17 years, 292 days	CDU/CSU	
41	Helmut Simon (1922–2013)	Justice (1 BR 2.4)	First Senate	15 June 1970 – 16 November 1987	16 years, 115 days	SPD	
42	Walter Rudi Wand (1928–1985)	Justice (2 BR 3.3)	Second Senate	26 October 1970 – 20 December 1983	13 years, 55 days	CDU/CSU	
43	Ernst Benda (1925–2009)	President (1 BT 1.4)	First Senate	8 December 1971 – 20 December 1983	12 years, 12 days	CDU/CSU	
44	Hans Joachim Faller (1915–2006)	Justice (1 BR 1.2)	First Senate	8 December 1971 – 19 July 1983	11 years, 223 days	CDU/CSU	
45	Martin Hirsch (1913–1992)	Justice (2 BT 4.2)	Second Senate	8 December 1971 – 6 July 1981	9 years, 210 days	SPD	
46	Joachim Rottmann (1925–2014)	Justice (2 BR 4.4)	Second Senate	8 December 1971 – 20 December 1983	12 years, 12 days	FDP	
47	Dietrich Katzenstein (1923–2008)	Justice (1 BT 4.3)	First Senate	7 November 1975 – 16 November 1987	12 years, 9 days	CDU/CSU	
48	Konrad Hesse (1919–2005)	Justice (1 BR 4.2)	First Senate	7 November 1975 – 16 July 1987	11 years, 251 days	FDP and SPD	
49	Engelbert Niebler (1921–2006)	Justice (2 BT 3.3)	Second Senate	7 November 1975 – 16 November 1987	12 years, 9 days	CDU/CSU	
50	Helmut Steinberger (1931–2014)	Justice (2 BR 1.4)	Second Senate	7 November 1975 – 16 November 1987	12 years, 9 days	CDU/CSU	
51	Gisela Niemeyer (1923–2012)	Justice (1 BR 3.3)	First Senate	2 November 1977 – 28 November 1989	12 years, 26 days	SPD	
52	Ernst Träger (1926–2015)	Justice (2 BR 2.2)	Second Senate	2 November 1977 – 28 November 1989	12 years, 26 days	CDU/CSU	
53	Hermann Heußner (1926–1996)	Justice (1 BT 3.3)	First Senate	7 May 1979 – 15 June 1989	10 years, 39 days	SPD	
54	Ernst Gottfried Mahrenholz (1929–2021)	Vice-President (2 BT 4.3) (1987–1994) Justice (2 BT 4.3) (1981–1987)	Second Senate	6 July 1981 – 24 March 1994	12 years, 261 days	SPD	
55	Franz Niedermaier (1925–1986)	Justice (1 BT 2.4)	First Senate	5 July 1983 – 5 April 1986 (Died)	2 years, 274 days	CDU/CSU	
56	Johann Friedrich Henschel (1931–2007)	Vice-President (1 BR 1.3) (1994–1995) Justice (1 BR 1.3) (1983–1994)	First Senate	19 July 1983 – 13 October 1995	12 years, 86 days	FDP	
57	Roman Herzog (1934–2017)	President (BT 1.5) (1987–1994) Vice-President (1 BT 1.5) (1983–1987)	First Senate	20 December 1983 – 30 June 1994	10 years, 192 days	CDU/CSU	
58	Hans Hugo Klein (born 1936)	Justice (1 BT 2.4)	Second Senate	20 December 1983 – 3 May 1996	12 years, 135 days	CDU/CSU	
59	Ernst-Wolfgang Böckenförde (1930–2019)	Justice (2 BR 4.5)	Second Senate	20 December 1983 – 3 May 1996	12 years, 135 days	SPD	
60	Otto Seidl (1931–2022)	Vice-President (1 BT 2.5) (1995–1998) Justice (1 BT 2.5) (1986–1995)	First Senate	10 June 1986 – 27 February 1998	11 years, 262 days	CDU/CSU	
61	Karin Graßhof (1937–2025)	Justice (2 BT 2.3)	Second Senate	6 October 1986 (Note: Badura & Dreier 2001 state 8 October 1986 as the date of Graßhof's appointment. The Federal Constitutional Court provides 6 October 1986 in a press release. The latter date is used here.) – 15 October 1998	11 years, 364 days	SPD	
62	Dieter Grimm (born 1937)	Justice (1 BR 4.3)	First Senate	16 July 1987 – 16 December 1999	12 years, 153 days	SPD	
63	Alfred Söllner (1930–2005)	Justice (1 BT 4.4)	First Senate	16 November 1987 – 13 October 1995	7 years, 331 days	CDU/CSU	
64	Thomas Dieterich (1934–2016)	Justice (1 BR 2.5)	First Senate	16 November 1987 – 4 February 1994	6 years, 80 days	SPD	
65	Everhardt Franßen (born 1937)	Justice (2 BT 1.3)	Second Senate	16 November 1987 – 30 June 1991	3 years, 226 days	SPD	
66	Konrad Kruis (1930–2022)	Justice (2 BT 3.4)	Second Senate	16 November 1987 – 28 September 1998	10 years, 316 days	CDU/CSU	
67	Paul Kirchhof (born 1943)	Justice (2 BR 1.5)	Second Senate	16 November 1987 – 16 December 1999	12 years, 30 days	CDU/CSU	
68	Jürgen Kühling (1934–2019)	Justice (2 BR 1.5)	First Senate	12 July 1989 – 23 January 2001	11 years, 195 days	SPD	
69	Helga Seibert (1939–1999)	Justice (1 BR 3.4)	First Senate	28 November 1989 – 28 September 1998	8 years, 304 days	SPD	
70	Klaus Winter (1936–2000)	Justice (2 BR 2.3)	Second Senate	28 November 1989 – 10 October 2000 (Died)	10 years, 317 days	CDU/CSU	
71	Bertold Sommer (born 1937)	Justice (2 BT 1.4)	Second Senate	12 July 1991 – 31 July 2003	12 years, 19 days	SPD	
72	Renate Jaeger (born 1940)	Justice (1 BR 2.6)	First Senate	24 March 1994 – 31 October 2004	10 years, 221 days	SPD	
73	Jutta Limbach (1934–2016)	President (2 BT 4.4) (1994–2002) Vice-President (2 BT 4.4) (1994)	Second Senate	24 March 1994 – 10 April 2002	8 years, 17 days	SPD	
74	Evelyn Haas (born 1949)	Justice (1 BT 1.6)	First Senate	14 September 1994 – 2 October 2006	12 years, 18 days	CDU/CSU	
75	Udo Steiner (born 1939)	Justice (1 BT 4.5)	First Senate	13 October 1995 – 1 October 2007	11 years, 353 days	CDU/CSU	
76	Dieter Hömig (1938–2016)	Justice (1 BR 1.4)	First Senate	13 October 1995 – 25 April 2006	10 years, 194 days	FDP	
77	Hans-Joachim Jentsch (1937–2021)	Justice (2 BR 3.5)	Second Senate	3 May 1996 – 28 September 2005	9 years, 148 days	CDU/CSU	
78	Winfried Hassemer (1940–2014)	Vice-President (2 BT 3.5) (2002–2008) Justice (2 BT 3.5) (1996–2002)	Second Senate	3 May 1996 – 7 May 2008	12 years, 4 days	SPD	
79	Hans-Jürgen Papier (born 1943)	President (1 BT 2.6) (2002–2010) Vice-President (1 BT 2.6) (1998–2002)	First Senate	27 February 1998 – 16 March 2010	12 years, 17 days	CDU/CSU	
80	Siegfried Broß (born 1946)	Justice (2 BT 3.5)	Second Senate	28 September 1998 – 16 November 2010	12 years, 49 days	CDU/CSU	
81	Lerke Osterloh (born 1944)	Justice (2 BT 2.4)	Second Senate	15 October 1998 – 16 November 2010	12 years, 32 days	SPD	
82	Christine Hohmann-Dennhardt (born 1950)	Justice (1 BR 3.5)	First Senate	11 November 1999 – 2 February 2011	11 years, 83 days	SPD	
83	Wolfgang Hoffmann-Riem (born 1940)	Justice (1 BR 4.4)	First Senate	16 December 1999 – 2 April 2008	8 years, 108 days	SPD	
84	Udo Di Fabio (born 1954)	Justice (2 BR 1.6)	Second Senate	16 December 1999 – 19 December 2011	12 years, 3 days	CDU/CSU	
85	Brun-Otto Bryde (born 1943)	Justice (1 BT 3.5)	First Senate	23 January 2001 – 2 February 2011	10 years, 10 days	Alliance 90/The Greens	
86	Rudolf Mellinghoff (born 1954)	Justice (2 BR 2.4)	Second Senate	23 January 2001 – 31 October 2011	10 years, 281 days	CDU/CSU	
87	Gertrude Lübbe-Wolff (born 1953)	Justice (2 BT 4.5)	Second Senate	10 April 2002 – 2 June 2014	12 years, 53 days	SPD	
88	Michael Gerhardt (born 1948)	Justice (2 BT 1.5)	Second Senate	31 July 2003 – 15 July 2014	10 years, 349 days	SPD	
89	Reinhard Gaier (born 1954)	Justice (1 BR 2.7)	First Senate	1 November 2004 – 8 November 2016	12 years, 7 days	SPD	
90	Herbert Landau (born 1948)	Justice (2 BR 3.6)	Second Senate	28 September 2005 – 20 July 2016	10 years, 296 days	CDU/CSU	
91	Michael Eichberger (born 1953)	Justice (1 BR 1.5)	First Senate	25 April 2006 – 16 July 2018	10 years, 82 days	CDU/CSU	
92	Wilhelm Schluckebier (born 1949)	Justice (1 BT 1.7)	First Senate	2 October 2006 – 1 December 2017	11 years, 60 days	CDU/CSU	
93	Ferdinand Kirchhof (born 1949)	Vice-President (1 BT 4.6) (2010–2018) Justice (1 BT 4.6) (2007–2010)	First Senate	1 October 2007 – 30 November 2018	11 years, 60 days	CDU/CSU	
94	Johannes Masing (born 1959)	Justice (1 BR 4.5)	First Senate	2 April 2008 – 10 July 2020	12 years, 99 days	SPD	
95	Andreas Voßkuhle (born 1963)	President (2 BR 4.7) (2010–2020) Vice-President (2 BR 4.7) (2008–2010)	Second Senate t	7 May 2008 – 22 June 2020	12 years, 46 days	SPD	
96	Andreas Paulus (born 1963)	Justice (1 BT 2.7)	First Senate	16 March 2010 – 3 June 2022	12 years, 79 days	FDP	
97	Monika Hermanns (born 1959)	Justice (2 BT 2.5)	Second Senate	16 November 2010 – 11 January 2023	12 years, 56 days	SPD	
98	Peter M. Huber (born 1959)	Justice (2 BT 3.6)	Second Senate	16 November 2010 – 11 January 2023	12 years, 56 days	CDU/CSU	
99	Susanne Baer (born 1964)	Justice (1 BT 3.6)	First Senate	2 February 2011 – 20 February 2023	12 years, 21 days	Alliance 90/The Greens	
100	Gabriele Britz (born 1968)	Justice (1 BR 3.6)	First Senate	2 February 2011 – 17 April 2023	12 years, 74 days	SPD	
101	Peter Müller (born 1955)	Justice (2 BR 1.7)	Second Senate	19 December 2011 – 21 December 2023	12 years, 4 days	CDU/CSU	
102	Sibylle Kessal-Wulf (born 1958)	Justice (2 BR 2.5)	Second Senate	19 December 2011 – 21 December 2023	12 years, 4 days	CDU/CSU	
103	Doris König (born 1957)	Vice President (2 BT 4.6) (2020–2025) Justice (2 BT 4.6) (2014–2020)	Second Senate	2 June 2014 – 7 October 2025	11 years, 127 days	SPD	
104	Ulrich Maidowski (born 1958)	Justice (2 BT 1.6)	Second Senate	15 July 2014 – 7 October 2025	11 years, 84 days	SPD	
105	Christine Langenfeld (born 1958)	Justice (2 BR 3.7)	Second Senate	20 July 2016 – Incumbent	9 years, 337 days	CDU/CSU	
106	Yvonne Ott (born 1963)	Justice (1 BR 2.8)	First Senate	8 November 2016 – Incumbent	9 years, 226 days	SPD	
107	Josef Christ (born 1956)	Justice (1 BT 1.8)	First Senate	1 December 2017 – 7 October 2025	7 years, 310 days	CDU/CSU	
108	Henning Radtke (born 1962)	Justice (1 BR 1.6)	First Senate	16 July 2018 – Incumbent	7 years, 341 days	CDU/CSU	
109	Stephan Harbarth (born 1971)	President (1 BT 4.7) (2020–) Vice-President (1 BT 4.7) (2018–2020)	First Senate	30 November 2018 – Incumbent	7 years, 204 days	CDU/CSU	
110	Astrid Wallrabenstein (born 1969)	Justice (2 BR 4.8)	Second Senate	22 June 2020 – Incumbent	6 years, 0 days	Alliance 90/The Greens	
111	Ines Härtel (born 1972)	Justice (1 BR 4.6)	First Senate	10 July 2020 – Incumbent	5 years, 347 days	SPD	
112	Heinrich Amadeus Wolff (born 1965)	Justice (1 BT 2.8)	First Senate	3 June 2022 – Incumbent	4 years, 19 days	FDP	
113	Rhona Fetzer (born 1963)	Justice (2 BT 2.6)	Second Senate	11 January 2023 – Incumbent	3 years, 162 days	SPD	
114	Thomas Offenloch (born 1972)	Justice (2 BT 3.7)	Second Senate	11 January 2023 – Incumbent	3 years, 162 days	FDP	
115	Martin Eifert (born 1965)	Justice (1 BT 3.7)	First Senate	20 February 2023 – Incumbent	3 years, 122 days	Alliance 90/The Greens	
116	Miriam Meßling (born 1973)	Justice (1 BR 3.7)	First Senate	17 April 2023 – Incumbent	3 years, 66 days	SPD	
117	Peter Frank (born 1968)	Justice (2 BR 1.8)	Second Senate	21 December 2023 – Incumbent	2 years, 183 days	CDU/CSU	
118	Holger Wöckel (born 1976)	Justice (2 BR 2.6)	Second Senate	21 December 2023 – Incumbent	2 years, 183 days	CDU/CSU	
119	Sigrid Emmenegger (born 1976)	Justice (2 BT 4.7)	Second Senate	7 October 2025 – Incumbent	258 days	SPD	
120	Ann-Katrin Kaufhold (born 1976)	Vice-President (2 BT 1.7)	Second Senate	7 October 2025 – Incumbent	258 days	SPD	
121	Günter Spinner (born 1972)	Justice (1 BT 1.9)	First Senate	7 October 2025 – Incumbent	258 days	CDU/CSU	
Justice		Position (seat)	Senate	Tenure (as justice)	Tenure length (as justice)	Proposal	Ref.
