= Ernst Benda =

German judge (1925–2009)

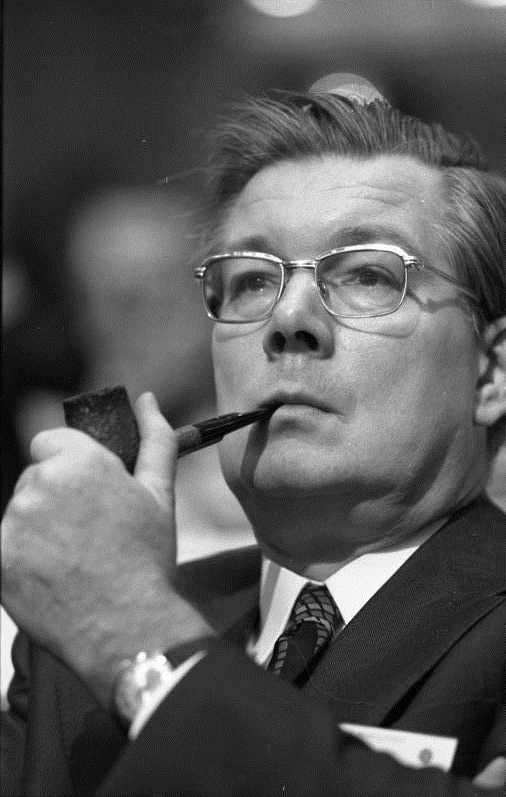

4th President of the Federal Constitutional Court of Germany
- In office 8 December 1971 – 20 December 1983
- Preceded by: Gebhard Müller
- Succeeded by: Wolfgang Zeidler

6th Federal Minister of the Interior of Germany
- In office 2 April 1968 – 21 October 1969
- Preceded by: Paul Lücke
- Succeeded by: Hans-Dietrich Genscher

Member of the Bundestag
- In office 15 October 1957 – 8 December 1971

Personal details
- Born: 15 January 1925 Berlin, Germany
- Died: 2 March 2009 (aged 84) Karlsruhe, Germany
- Party: CDU
- Education: Free University of Berlin

Ernst Benda (15 January 1925 – 2 March 2009) was a German legal scholar, politician, and judge. He was the fourth president of the Federal Constitutional Court of Germany from 1971 to 1983. He also held the position of Minister of the Interior of Germany from 1968 to 1969.

Benda was born in Berlin, the son of an engineer. After completing his schooling, he served in the Kriegsmarine from 1943 to 1945. After World War II, he pursued law studies at the Humboldt University of Berlin in East Berlin. However, in 1948, he moved to the University of Wisconsin and later to the Free University of Berlin in West Berlin. In 1956, he began working as a lawyer in Berlin.

Benda became a member of the Christian Democratic Union (CDU) in 1946. He played a role in founding the Kampfgruppe gegen Unmenschlichkeit (KgU) ("Combat Group against Inhumanity") in 1948, an anti-communist organization that operated in the German Democratic Republic (GDR). The KgU received financial support from various Western intelligence agencies and the West German government. He served as a member of the Abgeordnetenhaus von Berlin, the parliament of Berlin, from 1954 to 1957. In 1957, he was elected to the Bundestag, the West German parliament. In 1965, Benda played a role in bringing significant changes to West Germany's statutes of limitations for murder, allowing charges of murder against former National Socialists. He held the position of Secretary of State in the German interior ministry from 1967 and became Minister of the Interior in 1968.

In 1969, Benda was appointed as a judge to the Federal Constitutional Court of Germany. He became the president of the court from 1971 to 1983. Starting in 1984, Benda held the position of a professor of law at the University of Freiburg.

== Awards and honours ==
1974 Grand Cross of Merit of the Italian Republic
1975 Grand Gold Medal with Ribbon for Services to the Republic of Austria
1983 Grand Cross of the Order of Merit of the Federal Republic of Germany
1974 Honorary Doctorate from the Faculty of Law, Julius-Maximilians-Universität Würzburg
1978 Honorary Professor at the University of Trier
1978 Pipe smoker of the year
1987 Heinz-Herbert Karry Prize
