= Willi Geiger (judge) =

German judge (1909–1994)

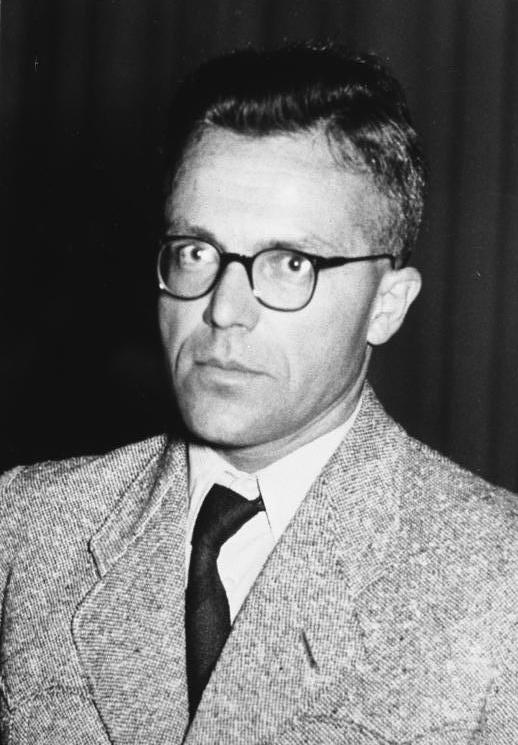
- Willi Geiger in 1951

Justice of the Federal Constitutional Court of Germany
- In office 7 September 1951 – 2 November 1977

Willi Geiger (22 May 1909 in Neustadt an der Weinstraße – 19 January 1994 in Karlsruhe) was a German judge. He was president of the Federal Court of Justice of Germany and Associate Justice in the Federal Constitutional Court of Germany.

== Biography ==
After the Nazi seizure of power 1933 Geiger joined the SA and in 1934 the National Socialist Association of Legal Professionals and National Socialist People's Welfare. In 1937, he joined the NSDAP. Geiger worked as a prosecutor at the Bamberg Sondergericht and gave at least five times capital punishment.

In 1940, he wrote a dissertation with Wilhelm Laforet on the subject of The Legal Status of the Editor under the Law of October 4, 1933. In it he justified, among other things, the professional bans on Jewish and left-wing journalists. The regulation had "eliminated at one stroke the overpowering, people-damaging and culture-injuring influence of the Jewish race in the field of the press." In the bibliography, he placed asterisks for "author is Jewish" for some authors. Journalistic recourse to Jewish texts was a professional offense. Thanks to the National Socialist Schriftleitergesetz, German journalism had been quickly and thoroughly purged of undesirable elements and the "Marxist press" had been put out of business. In this context, he equated journalists with professional civil servants. In this profession, he said, anyone who had proven himself - as a non-Aryan (cf. Aryan) or politically and professionally as a "pest to the people and the state" was unacceptable. Membership in a left-wing party was not the issue, but rather the "necessary personal qualities" of the journalist. That a secretary had to be of Aryan descent as a matter of principle had been derived by Geiger directly from the party program of the NSDAP.

From 1941 to 1943, Geiger served as a prosecutor at the Bamberg Special Court. He obtained death sentences there in at least five cases, including against an 18-year-old who was alleged to have committed sexual acts against a minor slightly younger than himself. Geiger rejected a plea for clemency from the defense attorney because of the defendant's youth. He attended the execution and enforced that it be publicized by posters and press notices. Another verdict concerned a forced laborer who had drawn a pocket knife against six to eight young boys who were beating him. Geiger made a point of publicizing the death sentence through posters.
