= Wolfgang Zeidler =

German legal scholar and judge

5th President of the Federal Constitutional Court of Germany
- In office 20 December 1983 – 16 November 1987
- Preceded by: Ernst Benda
- Succeeded by: Roman Herzog

4th Vice-president of the Federal Constitutional Court of Germany
- In office 7 November 1975 – 20 December 1983
- Preceded by: Walter Seuffert
- Succeeded by: Roman Herzog

Personal details
- Born: 2 September 1924 Hamburg, Germany
- Died: 31 December 1987 (aged 63) Meran, Italy
- Education: University of Hamburg

Wolfgang Zeidler (2 September 1924 – 31 December 1987) was a German legal scholar and judge. He joined the 2nd senate of the Federal Constitutional Court of Germany in November 1975. He served as the 5th president of the Court from 1983 to 1987. Zeidler also served as president of the British-German-Jurists' Association. He was married and had a son.
