= Andreas Voßkuhle =

German legal scholar

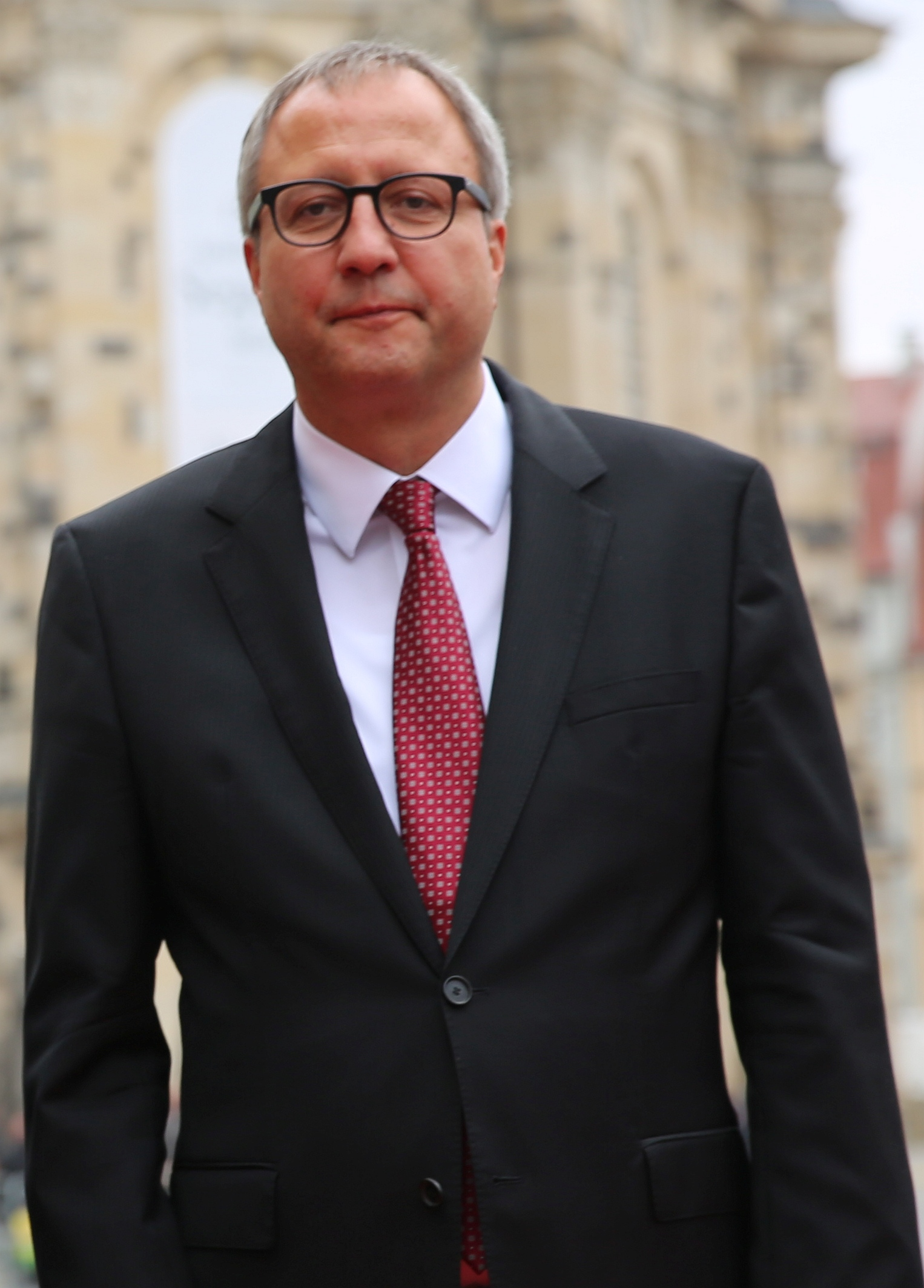
- Voßkuhle in 2016

President of the Federal Constitutional Court of Germany
- In office 16 March 2010 – 22 June 2020
- Vice-President: Ferdinand Kirchhof; Stephan Harbarth
- Nominated by: SPD
- Appointed by: Bundestag
- Preceded by: Hans-Jürgen Papier
- Succeeded by: Stephan Harbarth

Vice-President of the Federal Constitutional Court of Germany
- In office 7 May 2008 – 16 March 2010
- President: Hans-Jürgen Papier
- Nominated by: SPD
- Appointed by: Bundesrat
- Preceded by: Winfried Hassemer
- Succeeded by: Ferdinand Kirchhof

Judge of the Federal Constitutional Court of Germany for the Second Senate
- In office 7 May 2008 – 22 June 2020
- Nominated by: SPD
- Appointed by: Bundesrat
- Preceded by: Winfried Hassemer
- Succeeded by: Astrid Wallrabenstein

Personal details
- Born: 21 December 1963 (age 62) Detmold, North Rhine-Westphalia, West Germany (now Germany)
- Spouse: Eva Voßkuhle
- Education: LMU Munich
- Occupation: Judge; Academic; Civil Servant

Andreas Voßkuhle (born 21 December 1963) is a German legal scholar who served as the president of the Federal Constitutional Court of Germany from 2010 until 2020.

== Early life and education ==
Voßkuhle was born and grew up in the small Western German city of Detmold, where his father was a lawyer specializing in administrative law. Baptized into Lippische Landeskirche, one of Germany's few Reformed member churches. He started studying law at LMU Munich and the University of Bayreuth between 1983 and 1989. In 1989, he passed the first Staatsexamen. Before he completed the second Staatsexamen in 1993 he wrote his doctoral thesis (German title Rechtsschutz gegen den Richter [Legal protection against the judge]) under supervision of Peter Lerche.

== Career ==
=== Career in academia ===
Between 1992 and 1994, Voßkuhle was a research fellow at the chair for public law at the University of Augsburg. Later, in 1995, he worked as a referent in the Ministry of the Interior of the Free State of Bavaria. Following his habilitation at the University of Augsburg in 1998, he became a full professor at the University of Freiburg in 1999 as well as the head of their institute for political science and the philosophy of law. Additionally, he held various positions including faculty director of the law faculty.

Since 2007, he is also an ordinary member of the Berlin-Brandenburg Academy of Sciences and Humanities. Later, in July 2007, he became the head of the University of Freiburg as well. He started to work in this position in April 2008.

=== Judge on the Federal Constitutional Court, 2008–2020 ===
In May 2008, Voßkuhle became the vice-president of the Federal Constitutional Court of Germany and the chairman of its second senate. He was the second choice of the SPD, after their initial candidate, Horst Dreier, was rejected by the CDU because of his position regarding stem cell research and torture. When the mandate of the former President of the Court, Hans-Jürgen Papier ended in 2010, Voßkuhle became the youngest President in the history of the Federal Constitutional Court of Germany.

In February 2012, Chancellor Angela Merkel offered Voßkuhle the opportunity to succeed Christian Wulff as President of Germany, after the president's resignation. He later declined the offer.

The term of office of a judge on the Federal Constitutional Court is 12 years and cannot be extended. Therefore, his term ended in June 2020.

=== Later career ===
Since 2022, following an appointment by Chancellor Olaf Scholz, Voßkuhle has been serving on a three-member panel (alongside Norbert Lammert and Krista Sager) to assess potential conflicts of interest, requiring senior German officials from the chancellor to deputy ministers to observe a cooling-off period if they want to quit the government for a job in business.

== Controversy ==
After Norbert Lammert, the President of the Bundestag, criticized the court's 2009 ruling on the Treaty of Lisbon, Voßkuhle wrote in an essay for the daily newspaper Süddeutsche Zeitung that Lammert's statements were "strong words for a non-lawyer" and hardly served to "foster a culture of respect." Lammert eventually came around and upon "second reading" declared the court's ruling "a brilliant legal concept."

== Personal life ==
Voßkuhle is married to fellow lawyer Eva Voßkuhle. They do not have any children.

== Other activities ==
- University of Freiburg, Member of the Advisory Board
- Stiftung Mercator, Member of the Advisory Board
- Karlsruher Forum für Kultur, Recht und Technik, Member of the Board of Trustees
- Max Planck Society, Member of the Senate
- Max Planck Institute for Comparative Public Law and International Law, Member of the Board of Trustees
- Ernst Reuter Foundation for Advanced Study, Member of the Board of Trustees
- Fritz Thyssen Foundation, Member of the Scientific Advisory Board
