= Otto Seidl =

German judge (1931–2022)

9th Vice-president of the Federal Constitutional Court of Germany
- In office 13 October 1995 – 27 February 1998
- Preceded by: Johann Friedrich Henschel
- Succeeded by: Hans-Jürgen Papier

Justice of the Federal Constitutional Court of Germany
- In office 10 June 1986 – 27 February 1998

Personal details
- Born: 11 December 1931 Munich, Bavaria, Germany
- Died: 10 December 2022 (aged 90)
- Education: LMU Munich
- Occupation: Judge

Otto Seidl (11 December 1931 – 10 December 2022) was a German judge. He served as vice-president of the Federal Constitutional Court from 1995 to 1998.

Seidl died on 10 December 2022, at the age of 90.
