= Federal Administrative Court (Germany) =

One of the five federal supreme courts of Germany

Coordinates: 51°19′59″N 12°22′11″E

- Bundesverwaltungsgericht

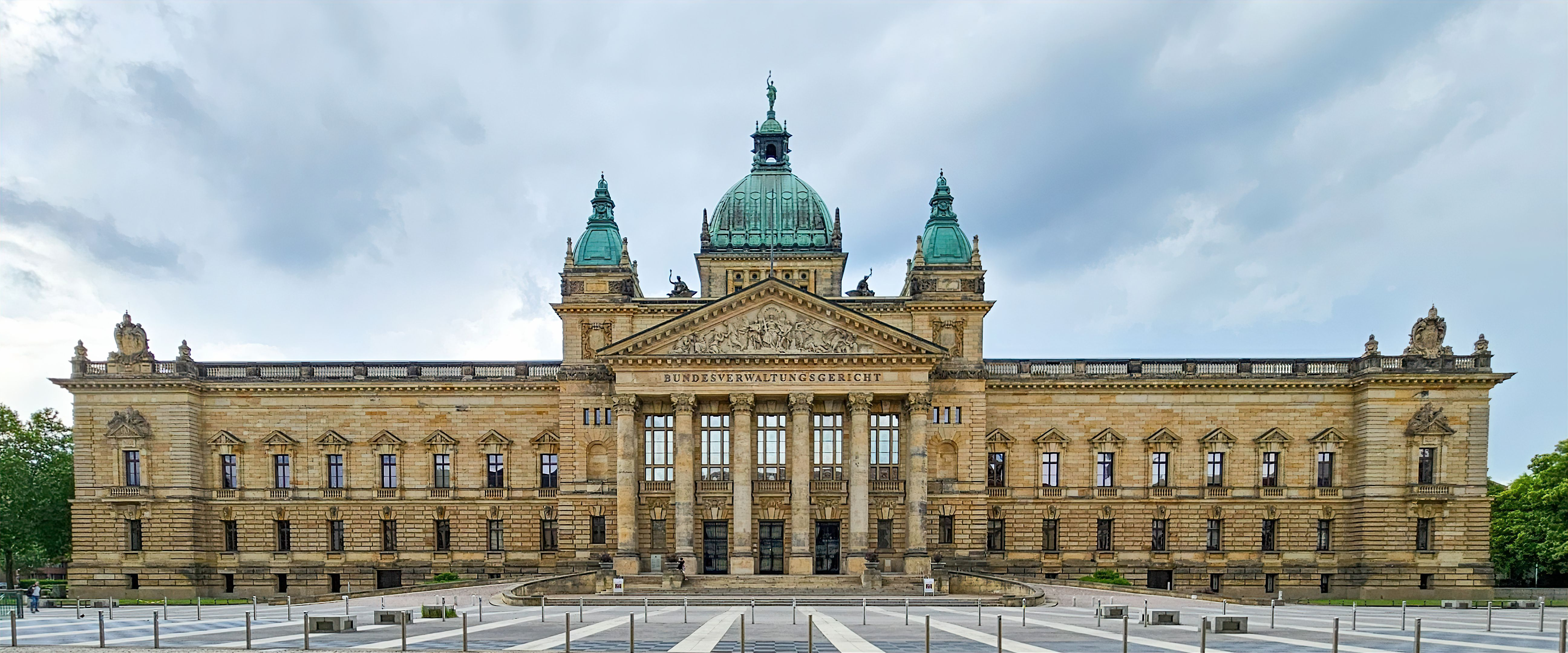
- Reich Court building in 2024
- Interactive map of Federal Administrative Court
- Established: 1952
- Jurisdiction: Federal Republic of Germany
- Location: Leipzig, Saxony, Germany
- Authorised by: Basic Law of Germany
- Website: bverwg.de

President of the Federal Administrative Court
- Currently: Andreas Korbmacher

The Federal Administrative Court (German: Bundesverwaltungsgericht, pronounced [bʊndəsfɛɐˈvaltʊŋsɡəˌʁɪçt], BVerwG) is one of the five federal supreme courts of Germany. It is the court of the last resort for generally all cases of administrative law, mainly disputes between citizens and the state. It hears appeals from the Oberverwaltungsgerichte, or Superior Administrative Courts, which, in turn, are the courts of appeals for decisions of the Verwaltungsgerichte (administrative courts).

However, cases concerning social security law belong to the jurisdiction of the Sozialgerichte (Social Courts) with the Bundessozialgericht as federal court of appeals, and cases of tax and customs law are decided by the Finanzgerichte (Fiscal Courts), and, ultimately, by the Bundesfinanzhof.

The Bundesverwaltungsgericht has its seat at the former Reich Court building in Leipzig's borough Mitte.

== History ==
The Federal Administrative Court was established on the basis of Article 95 (1) of the Basic Law by Act of 23 September 1952. The seat of the Federal Administrative Court was initially Berlin. Since 8 June 1953, the Federal Administrative Court was housed in the former premises of the Prussian Higher Administrative Court. The decision in favour of Berlin as the seat was controversial among the Allied Powers; the Soviet Union in particular was opposed to it. As a result, with the rearmament of the Federal Republic, the military service senates of the Federal Administrative Court had to move to Munich. Since the Federal Administrative Court moved from Berlin to Leipzig to the Reichsgericht building, they have also resided in Leipzig.

Leipzig was designated as the new seat of the Federal Administrative Court by law of 21 November 1997. The official date of the change of seat was set for 26 August 2002 by the Federal Minister of Justice by legal decree of 24 June 2002. The most recent chapter in the history of the Federal Administrative Court is thus connected with the use of the former Reichsgericht building in Leipzig – it officially began with the ceremonial inauguration of the building as the Federal Administrative Court on 12 September 2002.

== Previous judges ==
- Everhardt Franßen, 1991–2002
