= Federal Constitutional Court =

Supreme constitutional court for the Federal Republic of Germany

- Bundesverfassungsgericht
- Interactive map of Federal Constitutional Court
- 49°00′45″N 8°24′06″E
- Established: 1951
- Jurisdiction: Federal Republic of Germany
- Location: Karlsruhe, Baden-Württemberg, Germany
- Coordinates: 49°00′45″N 8°24′06″E
- Composition method: Election by Bundestag and Bundesrat
- Authorised by: Basic Law for Germany
- Judge term length: 12 years (mandatory retirement at 68)
- Number of positions: 16
- Annual budget: €37.17 million (2021)
- Website: www.bundesverfassungsgericht.de

President
- Currently: Stephan Harbarth
- Since: 22 June 2020

Vice President
- Currently: Ann-Katrin Kaufhold
- Since: 7 October 2025

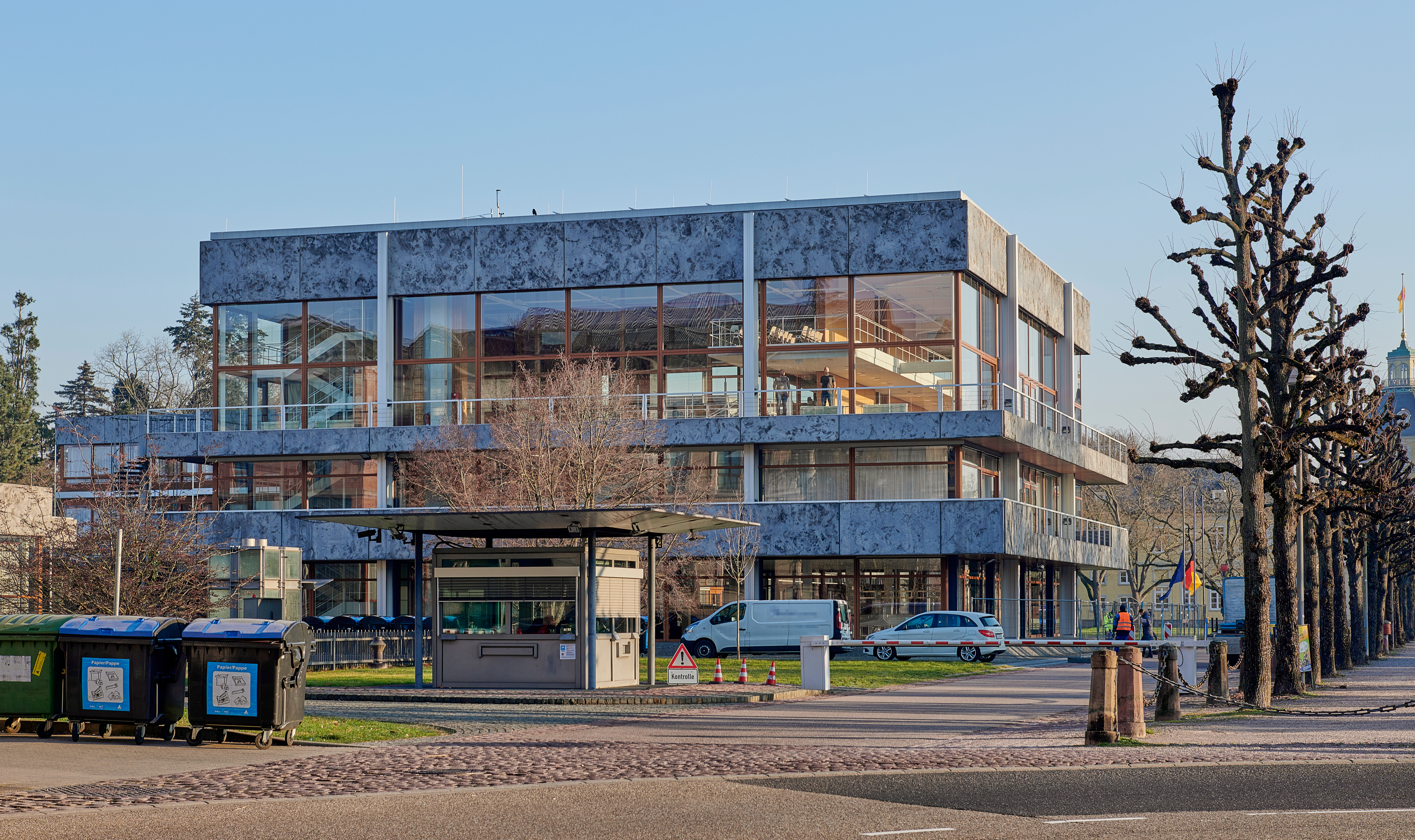
Bundesverfassungsgericht

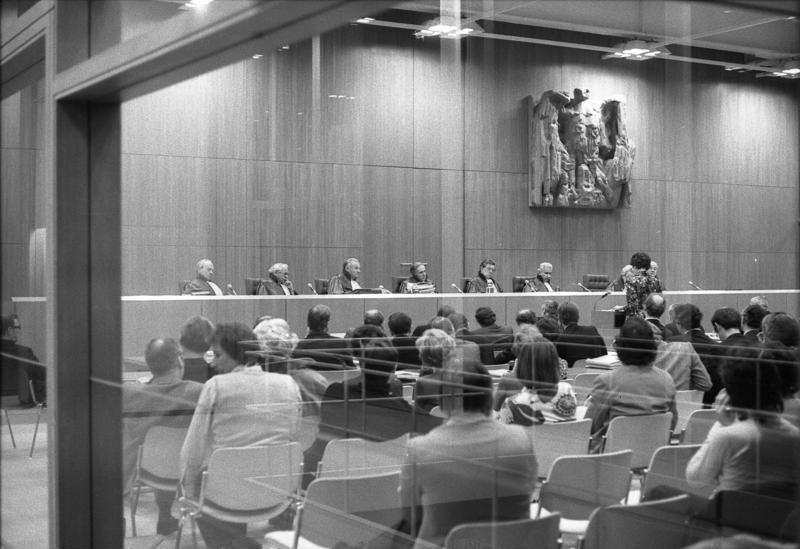
Oral proceedings in the courtroom (November 1974)

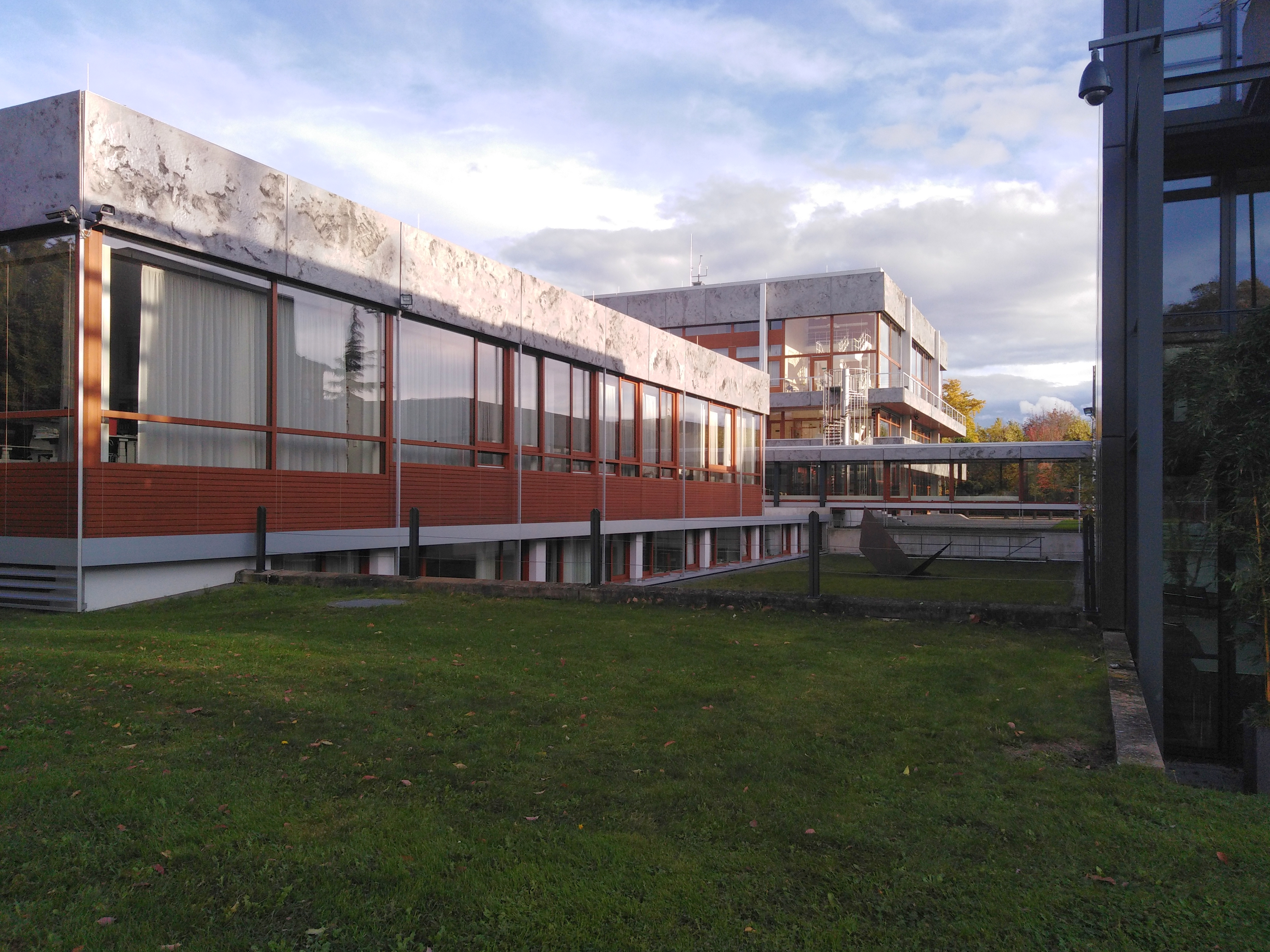
Library (foreground) and Courtroom (background)

The Federal Constitutional Court (German: Bundesverfassungsgericht [bʊndəsfɐˈfasʊŋsɡəˌʁɪçt]; abbreviated: BVerfG) is the supreme constitutional court for the Federal Republic of Germany, established by the constitution or Basic Law (Grundgesetz) of Germany. Since its inception with the beginning of the post-World War II republic, the court has been located in the city of Karlsruhe, which is also the seat of the Federal Court of Justice.

The main task of the Federal Constitutional Court is judicial review, and it may declare legislation unconstitutional, thus rendering it ineffective. In this respect, it is similar to other supreme courts with judicial review powers, yet the court possesses a number of additional powers and is regarded as among the most interventionist and powerful national courts in the world. Unlike other supreme courts, the constitutional court is not an integral stage of the judicial or appeals process (aside from cases concerning constitutional or public international law) and does not serve as a regular appellate court from lower courts or the Federal Supreme Courts on any violation of federal laws.

The court's jurisdiction is focused on constitutional issues and the compliance of all governmental institutions with the constitution. Constitutional amendments or changes passed by the parliament are subject to its judicial review, since they must be compatible with the most basic principles of the Grundgesetz defined by the eternity clause. (Note: Art. 79 s. III)

== Scope ==
The Basic Law of the Federal Republic of Germany stipulates that all three branches of the state (the legislature, executive, and judiciary) are bound directly by the constitution in Article 20, Section 3 of the document. As a result, the court can rule acts of any branches unconstitutional, whether as formal violations (exceeding powers or violating procedures) or as material conflicts (when the civil rights prescribed in the Basic Law are not respected).

The powers of the Federal Constitutional Court are defined in article 94 of the Basic Law. More detailed regulation is in the Federal Constitutional Court Act (Bundesverfassungsgerichtsgesetz), which also defines how decisions of the court on material conflicts are put into force. The Constitutional Court has therefore several strictly defined procedures in which cases may be brought before it:

- Constitutional complaint: By means of the Verfassungsbeschwerde (constitutional complaint) any person may allege that his or her fundamental rights have been violated, but only if all other legal remedies have been exhausted. Although only a small fraction of these are actually successful (ranging around 2.5% since 1951), several have resulted in major legislation being invalidated, especially in the field of taxation. The large majority of the court's procedures fall into this category; 135,968 such complaints were filed from 1957 to 2002.
  - Municipalities and associations of municipalities may also file a Verfassungsbeschwerde alleging interference in their Article 28 right to self-government.
- Abstract judicial review: The federal government, the state governments, or one-quarter of the membership of the Bundestag may bring a state or federal law before the court if they consider it unconstitutional. A well-known example of this procedure was the 1975 abortion decision, which invalidated legislation intended to decriminalise abortion.
- Concrete judicial review:
  - Article 100(1) of the Basic Law requires any regular court which believes that a law that is necessary to decide a case before it may not be constitutional to suspend the proceedings and bring that law to the Federal Constitutional Court.
  - Article 100(3) requires that state constitutional courts which propose a decision that will overrule or weaken a previous decision by either another state's constitutional court or the Federal Constitutional Court to obtain a decision from the latter.
- Federal dispute: All federal institutions established by the Basic Law may bring disputes over the scope of their powers, rights and duties before the court.
- State–federal dispute:
  - The federal government, the state governments, or one-quarter of the members of the Bundestag may ask the court to determine whether a state law conforms to federal law.
  - The Bundesrat, a state government, or a state parliament may ask the court to determine whether a federal law complies with Article 72(2) of the Basic Law – which regards various topics in which both the federal and state governments may pass legislation, but where the federal government's legislative power is restricted to ensuring equivalent living standards across the nation or the preservation of legal or economic unity.
    - If a bill to abrogate a federal law falling in this area (thus returning legislative power on the law's topic to the states) is rejected by the Bundestag, the same organs may appeal to the Court to determine whether the federal law remains necessary.
  - If the federal government believes a state is deficient in executing federal law, Article 84 of the Basic Law provides that either it or the involved state may ask the Bundesrat to determine whether the state is violating the law. The decision of the Bundesrat may be appealed to the court.
  - Any other dispute between a state and the federal government where no other legal recourse exists.
- Federal election scrutiny:
  - The Bundestag scrutinizes and certifies the results of federal and European Parliament elections. The Constitutional Court hears complaints regarding this certification, or violations of law or civil rights in the conduct of the election. These complaints may be raised within two months of the election by an eligible voter or group of voters, only if it was previously raised to the Bundestag and rejected; a Fraktion of the Bundestag; or one-tenth of the size of the Bundestag set by law (currently 63 members).
    - The court can declare an election invalid in whole or in part due to violations, as happened in Berlin after the 2021 election.
  - "Non-established" (not represented in the Bundestag or any state parliament) political associations, which must apply to the Federal Electoral Committee for legal recognition as a political party and approval to run in a federal election, may appeal a negative decision to the Constitutional Court.
  - A elected Bundestag member who is involuntarily removed from his seat (currently, only by being found ineligible to stand for election during the scrutiny process) may appeal the decision to the Constitutional Court.
- Impeachment procedure:
  - Impeachment proceedings may be brought against the Federal President for an intentional violation of federal law or the Basic Law with a two-thirds vote of the Bundestag or Bundesrat. The responsible body must submit a complaint to the Constitutional Court detailing the action (or failure to act) which violated the law. The court hears the complaint and decides on the removal of the President; it also has the power to suspend the President from his duties during the proceedings. This requires a two-thirds majority decision.
  - A majority of the Bundestag may impeach any federal judge for "infringing the principles of the Basic Law or the constitutional order of a state". The Constitutional Court hears the complaint, and may order the judge's transfer or retirement. If the court finds the violation is intentional, it may also remove the judge from office. This requires a two-thirds majority decision.
- Prohibition or hostile classification of a political party:
  - Article 21(2) of the Basic Law gives the Constitutional Court the power to ban political parties that either threaten the existence of Germany or "seek to undermine or abolish the free democratic basic order".
    - A complaint may be filed by the federal government, or by a majority of the Bundestag or Bundesrat. A complaint may be filed by a state government against a party if it only operates in that state.
    - If a party is banned, neither the founding of a new but substantially similar organization nor the repurposing of existing parallel or subordinate organizations as a substitute may take place. Distributing any of the party's material in any medium becomes a crime. Any sitting members in the Bundestag or a state parliament are automatically expelled unless they left the party before the complaint was filed. The court may also decide to confiscate any property belonging to the party and use it for "charitable purposes which are for the public benefit".
    - The court may limit its ban to legally or organizationally independent sections of a party (e.g., individual state or local associations), but it is unclear whether the initial complaint may also be filed against individual sections.
    - This has happened twice: the Socialist Reich Party (SRP), a neo-Nazi group, was banned in 1952, and the Communist Party of Germany (KPD) was banned in 1956. There have been two complaints seeking to ban another neo-Nazi party, The Homeland, then known as the National Democratic Party of Germany (NPD), which failed in 2003 and 2017 respectively.
    - A proposed complaint against Alternative for Germany (AfD) was supported by 124 members of the 20th Bundestag in 2024, but was not advanced to a final vote by the Bundestag Committee for Internal Affairs and subsequently died.
  - Article 21(3), added to the Basic Law in 2017, allows the Constitutional Court to exclude parties "oriented towards undermining or abolishing the free democratic basic order" or the German state (i.e., less stringent than Article 21(2)) from receiving public financing, as well as "any favourable fiscal treatment" of the party or its donors, such as tax exemptions.
    - This type of complaint may be filed by the same institutions as an Article 21(2) complaint. It may be filed as a subsidiary complaint to obtain a ruling under both sub-articles at once.
    - The federal government, Bundestag, and Bundesrat jointly submitted a complaint regarding The Homeland under this article in 2019. The court ruled for it in January 2024, and The Homeland is excluded from public financing until 2030.
  - Decisions under one or both articles require a two-thirds majority vote.
- Restriction of fundamental rights (Grundrechtsverwirkung): Article 18 of the Basic Law provides for the forfeiture of an individual's basic freedoms of expression (freedom of speech, the press, association, of teaching, or assembly; the right to the secrecy of communication, the right to property, and the right to apply for asylum) if they are used to undermine the democratic order or the German state. The right to human dignity and the freedom of religion are not subject to forfeiture. Upon a complaint from the federal government, a state government, or the Bundestag, the Constitutional Court decides on its validity. The court is free to decide which freedoms are forfeited, to what extent, and for what length of time. This requires a two-thirds majority decision.
  - Opening an Article 18 proceeding against a sitting member of the Bundestag requires the body's approval. The Bundestag also has the right to demand its suspension at any time.
  - Two Article 18 complaints have been filed by the federal government, seeking the respective restrictions for a length of time to be determined by the court, and formally decided:
    - Otto Ernst Remer, the founder of the Socialist Reich Party (freedom of speech, association and assembly) in 1952: rejected in 1960 as the court found the government failed to prove that Remer was still involved in politically subversive activities; he had fled the country and gone into hiding after the SRP was banned.
    - Gerhard Frey, editor of the National-Zeitung (freedom of the press) in 1969: rejected in 1974 as the court found the government failed to prove Frey was a future threat to the democratic order.
  - In 1992, the federal government filed an Article 18 complaint against two prominent neo-Nazi leaders, Thomas Dienel and Heinz Reisz. The complaint sought to prohibit the men from speaking publicly about politics either in-person or in the media, or participating in political events or organizations; the government asserted that a crackdown on those instigating right-wing violence against foreigners was necessary in the wake of the Mölln arson attack. However, the men were then convicted of Volksverhetzung and sentenced to prison, and subsequently released early due to a favorable prognosis toward reform. In 1996, the court informally dismissed the complaint as unnecessary as it found the men were no longer prominent figures in the right-wing extremist scene and did not pose a threat to the democratic order.
- Investigative committee review: Article 46 of the Basic Law allows one-quarter of the members of the Bundestag to establish a parliamentary inquiry committee (Untersuchungsausschuss). The decision may be referred to the Constitutional Court for a ruling on the committee's constitutionality.
- Original jurisdiction by law: The Constitutional Court may hear any other dispute which is specifically assigned to it by federal law. An example is a dispute over a referendum required by Article 29 of the Basic Law (to approve any changes in state boundaries).

Up to 2009, the Constitutional Court had struck down more than 600 laws as unconstitutional.

== Organization ==
The court consists of two senates, each of which has eight members, headed by a senate chairperson. The members of each senate are allocated to three chambers for hearings in constitutional complaint and single regulation control cases. Each chamber consists of three judges, so each senate chair is at the same time a member of two chambers. The court publishes selected decisions on its website and since 1996 a public relations department promotes selected decisions with press releases.

Decisions by a senate require a majority. For the impeachment of the President or a judge, restriction of fundamental rights, or prohibition or restriction of political parties, a two-thirds majority vote is required instead. A senate cannot decide that the law has been violated on a tied vote. Decisions by a chamber need to be unanimous. A chamber is not authorized to overrule a standing precedent of the senate to which it belongs; such issues need to be submitted to the senate as a whole. Similarly, a senate may not overrule a standing precedent of the other senate, and such issues will be submitted to a plenary meeting of all 16 judges (the Plenum).

The two-senate organization arose because they were foreseen to have different areas of responsibility: originally the first senate heard all disputes regarding fundamental rights, while the second senate heard disputes between federal bodies and the state and federal governments. As it was quickly discovered there were many more procedures in the first senate's area than the second, the Bundesverfassungsgerichtsgesetz was amended in 1956 to transfer several responsibilities to the second senate. It was later amended again to allow the court to modify each senate's responsibilities itself by plenary decision, to be published in the Federal Law Gazette and take effect at the beginning of the next calendar year. Though the original split of responsibilities remains written into law, the court has repeatedly modified it over the years to the point where there is no longer a great distinction between the senates.

Unlike all other German courts, the court often publishes the vote count on its decisions (though only the final tally, not every judge's personal vote) and even allows its members to issue a dissenting opinion. This possibility, introduced only in 1971, is a remarkable deviation from German judicial tradition.

One of the two senate chairs is also the president of the court, the other one being the vice president. The presidency alternates between the two senates, i.e. the successor of a president is always chosen from the other senate. The 10th and current president of the court is Stephan Harbarth.

== Democratic function ==
The Constitutional Court actively administers the law and ensures that political and bureaucratic decisions comply with the rights of the individual enshrined in the Basic Law. Specifically, it can vet the democratic and constitutional legitimacy of bills proposed by federal or state government, scrutinise decisions (such as those relating to taxation) by the administration, arbitrate disputes over the implementation of law between states and the federal government and (most controversially) ban non-democratic political parties. The Constitutional Court enjoys more public trust than the federal or state parliaments, which possibly derives from the German enthusiasm for the rule of law.

== Appointment of judges ==
The court's judges are elected by the Bundestag (the German parliament) and the Bundesrat (a legislative body that represents the sixteen state governments on the federal level). According to the Basic Law, each of these bodies selects four members of each senate. The election of a judge requires a two-thirds vote. The selection of the chairperson of each senate alternates between Bundestag and Bundesrat and also requires a two-thirds vote.

Up until 2015, the Bundestag delegated this task to a special committee (Richterwahlausschuss, judges' election committee), consisting of a small number of Bundestag members. This procedure had caused some constitutional concern and was considered to be unconstitutional by many scholars. In 2015, the Bundesverfassungsgerichtsgesetz (Federal Constitutional Court Act) was changed in this respect. In this new system, it is the Bundestag itself that elects judges to the court, and this by secret ballot in the plenum. To be selected, candidates must get a two-thirds majority of those present at the vote, and provided that the number of votes in favor constitutes an absolute majority of the total membership of the Bundestag, including those not present at the vote. The Richterwahlausschuss retains the power to nominate candidates. This new procedure was applied for the first time in September 2017, when Josef Christ was elected to the first senate as the successor of Wilhelm Schluckebier. In the Bundesrat, a chamber in which the governments of the sixteen German states are represented (each state has 3 to 6 votes depending on its population, which it has to cast en bloc), a candidate currently needs at least 46 of 69 possible votes.

If a vacancy is not filled within two months, the court may nominate a replacement itself at the request of the highest-ranking official of the responsible body – either the oldest member of the Richterwahlausschuss or the president of the Bundesrat.

The judges are in principle elected for a 12-year term, though they must retire upon reaching the age of 68 regardless of how much of the 12 years they have served. Re-election is not possible. A judge must be at least 40 years old and must be a well-trained jurist. Three out of eight members of each senate have served as a judge on one of the federal courts. Of the other five members of each senate, most judges previously served as academic jurists at a university, as public servants or as a lawyer. After ending their term, most judges withdraw themselves from public life. However, there are some prominent exceptions, most notably Roman Herzog, who was elected President of Germany in 1994, shortly before the end of his term as president of the court.

=== Constitutional reform ===
Previously, nearly all detail of the court's structure and function was not in the Basic Law but regulated by the Bundesverfassungsgerichtsgesetz, which as regular law was subject to change only by a simple majority vote. A 2024 constitutional amendment wrote the term and age limit, the autonomy of the court and the 16-judge and two-senate structure into Article 93 of the Basic Law (thereby moving the regulation of the court's jurisdiction and powers to Article 94). These details now require a two-thirds majority of the Bundestag and Bundesrat to be modified.

This amendment also added a provision allowing regular law to provide for the transfer of one legislative body's right to elect a judge to the other. Concurrently, the Bundesverfassungsgerichtsgesetz was amended such that the transfer automatically takes place if a vacancy is not filled within three months of a nomination by the court (i.e., ensuring a vacancy lasts at most five months). Any judge elected in this manner is treated as if they were elected by the originally responsible body, so it does not get additional nominations by failing to act. In practice, this measure removes the veto power over judge nominations of a so-called "blocking minority" (Sperrminorität) in the Bundestag – an uncooperative party which is in opposition but has over one-third of seats.

=== Current members ===
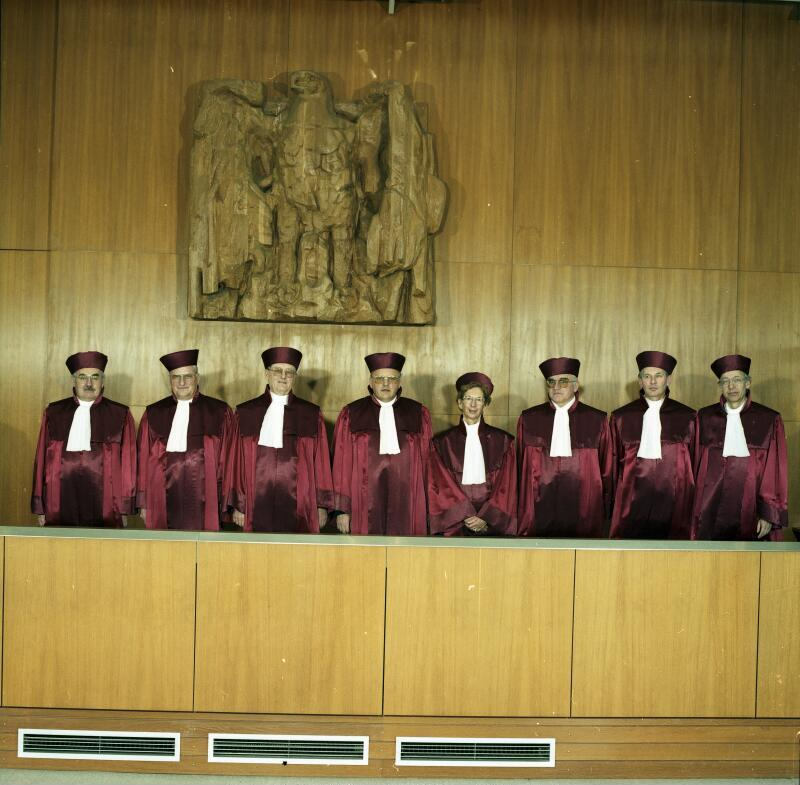
First Senate 1989

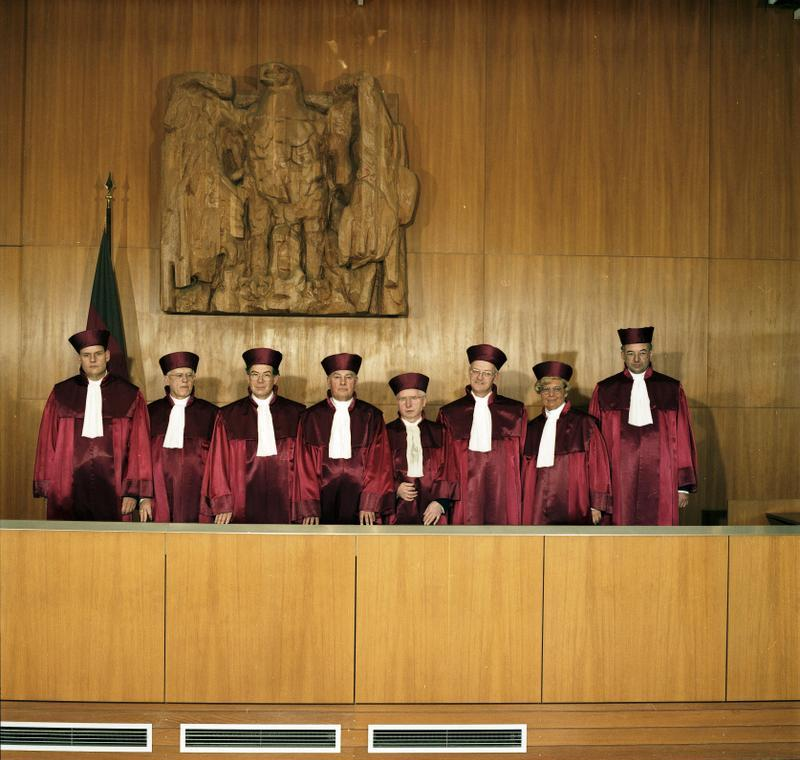
Second Senate 1989

| Name | Term | Nomination by | Election by |
First Senate
| Stephan Harbarth (born 1971) (President of the Court, Chairman of the First Senate) | November 2018 – November 2030 (12-year-term) | CDU/CSU | Bundestag (as judge); Bundesrat (as president) |
| Miriam Meßling (born 1973) | April 2023 – April 2035 (12-year term) | SPD | Bundesrat |
| Yvonne Ott (born 1963) | November 2016 – November 2028 (12-year-term) | SPD | Bundesrat |
| Henning Radtke (born 1962) | July 2018 – May 2030 (retirement) | CDU/CSU | Bundesrat |
| Ines Härtel (born 1972) | July 2020 – July 2032 (12-year term) | SPD | Bundesrat |
| Heinrich Amadeus Wolff (born 1965) | June 2022 – June 2033 (retirement) | FDP | Bundestag |
| Martin Eifert (born 1965) | February 2023 – 2033 (retirement) | Greens | Bundestag |
| Günter Spinner (born 1972) | November 2025 – November 2037 (12-year-term) | CDU/CSU | Bundestag |
Second Senate
| Ann-Katrin Kaufhold (born 1976) (Vice president of the Court, Chairwoman of the Second Senate) | November 2025 – November 2037 (12-year-term) | SPD | Bundestag (as judge); Bundesrat (as vice president) |
| Christine Langenfeld (born 1962) | July 2016 – July 2028 (12-year term) | CDU/CSU | Bundesrat |
| Astrid Wallrabenstein (born 1969) | June 2020 – June 2032 (12-year term) | Greens | Bundesrat |
| Rhona Fetzer (born 1963) | January 2023 – September 2031 (retirement) | SPD | Bundestag |
| Thomas Offenloch (born 1972) | January 2023 – January 2035 (12-year term) | FDP | Bundestag |
| Peter Frank (born 1968) | December 2023 – December 2035 (12-year term) | CDU/CSU | Bundesrat |
| Holger Wöckel (born 1976) | December 2023 – December 2035 (12-year term) | CDU/CSU | Bundesrat |
| Sigrid Emmenegger (born 1976) | November 2025 – November 2037 (12-year-term) | SPD | Bundestag |

=== Presidents of the court ===
The court's head is the president of the Federal Constitutional Court, who chairs one of the two senates and joint sessions of the court, while the other senate is chaired by the vice president of Federal Constitutional Court. The right to elect the president and the vice president alternates between the Bundestag and the Bundesrat. If the president of the Federal Constitutional Court leaves office, i.e. when his or her term as judge at the court ends, the legislative body, whose turn it is to choose the president, has to elect one of the judges of the senate, of which the former president was not a member, with a two-thirds majority. If the office of the vice president falls vacant, a new vice president is elected from the senate, of which the sitting president is not a member, by the legislative body, which has not elected the former vice president. The given legislative body is free to elect the judge it prefers, but with respect to the position of president, it has been always the sitting vice president, who was elected president, since 1983.

The president of the Federal Constitutional Court ranks fifth in the German order of precedence, as the highest-ranking representative of the judicial branch of government.

| No. | Portrait | Name (birth-death) | Previous service before court appointment | Took office | Left office | Sen. | Vice president |
|---|---|---|---|---|---|---|---|
| 1 | | Hermann Höpker-Aschoff (1883–1954) | Member of the Bundestag (1949–1951) | 7 September 1951 | 15 January 1954 (died in office) | 1st | Rudolf Katz (1951–1954) |
| 2 | | Josef Wintrich (1891–1958) | President of the Munich Regional court of appeal (1953) | 23 March 1954 | 19 October 1958 (died in office) | 1st | Rudolf Katz (1954–1958) |
| 3 | | Gebhard Müller (1900–1990) | Minister President of Baden-Württemberg (1953–1958) | 8 January 1959 | 8 December 1971 | 1st | Rudolf Katz (1959–1961), Friedrich Wilhelm Wagner (1961–1967), Walter Seuffert (1967–1971) |
| 4 | | Ernst Benda (1925–2009) | Member of the Bundestag (1957–1971) | 8 December 1971 | 20 December 1983 | 1st | Walter Seuffert (1971–1975), Wolfgang Zeidler (1975–1983) |
| 5 | | Wolfgang Zeidler (1924–1987) | President of the Federal Administrative Court (1970–1975) | 20 December 1983 | 16 November 1987 | 2nd | Roman Herzog (1983–1987) |
| 6 | | Roman Herzog (1934–2017) | Baden-Württemberg State Minister of the Interior (1980–1983) | 16 November 1987 | 30 June 1994 (resigned) | 1st | Ernst Gottfried Mahrenholz (1987–1994), Jutta Limbach (1994) |
| 7 | | Jutta Limbach (1934–2016) | Berlin Senator of Justice (1989–1994) | 14 September 1994 | 10 April 2002 | 2nd | Johann Friedrich Henschel (1994–1995), Otto Seidl (1995–1998), Hans-Jürgen Papier (1998–2002) |
| 8 | | Hans-Jürgen Papier (b. 1943) | Professor for constitutional law at LMU Munich (1992–1998) | 10 April 2002 | 16 March 2010 | 1st | Winfried Hassemer (2002–2008), Andreas Voßkuhle (2008–2010) |
| 9 | | Andreas Voßkuhle (b. 1963) | Professor for political science and legal philosophy at the University of Freiburg (since 1999); Rector of the University of Freiburg (2008) | 16 March 2010 | 22 June 2020 | 2nd | Ferdinand Kirchhof (2010–2018), Stephan Harbarth (2018–2020) |
| 10 | | Stephan Harbarth (b. 1971) | Member of the Bundestag (2009–2018) | 22 June 2020 | | 1st | Doris König (since 2020) |

== Criticism ==
The court has been subject to criticism. One complaint is the perceived function as a replacement lawmaker (German: Ersatzgesetzgeber) because it has overturned controversial policies numerous times, such as the Luftsicherheitsgesetz, the Mietendeckel (rent cap) of Berlin, and parts of the Ostpolitik. This behavior has been interpreted as a hindrance to the normal functioning of the parliament.

Another criticism of the federal constitutional court issued by the former president of the Federal Intelligence Service, August Hanning, is that the court tends to overprotect people, according to him, even members of ISIS. He considers that to hinder the efficiency of German intelligence agencies in favour of protecting people in far-away countries.

Finally, numerous decisions have been criticised and sparked demonstrations.

== Landmark decisions ==
| Year | Case | Unofficial name | Synopsis | Legal principles set | Consequences |
Human dignity
| 1993 | 2 BvF 2/90 | (None) | Federal lawmakers permitted abortion within twelve weeks after implantation. To be legal the expectant mother had to go to a pregnancy consultation minimum three days in advance and the abortion has to be their own decision. | If a pregnancy is not the result of a criminal interaction or a threat to the mother's life or health an abortion violates the right to life of an embryo. As a result, in the last case, abortion has to be prohibited. | Following the decision the lawmakers changed the criminal law. They prohibited abortion within twelve weeks but after using a pregnancy consultation all participants go unpunished. |
| 2003 | 1 BvR 426/02 | Benetton II | The Federal Court of Justice prohibited the magazine Stern to publish a shocking advertisement of the Benetton Group. The advertisement showed a bare bottom with a stamp: "HIV-positive". | Human dignity is absolute. All fundamental rights are substantiations of human dignity therefore there is no trade-off of human dignity and any fundamental right possible. | The case was remanded to the Federal Court of Justice for a second time. After Benetton II the plaintiff abandoned the lawsuit. A final decision was unnecessary. |
| 2006 | 1 BvR 357/05 | Civil aviation security act decision | Federal lawmakers permitted the military to shoot down civil aeroplanes if there is an indication that they will be used as a weapon against human lives and a shoot-down is the last resort. | Human dignity is inviolable. There cannot be any trade-off of the lives of innocent people.; The military can be used as disaster relief, but the use of military weapons violates the constitution.; Only the federal government can order the military to provide disaster relief. | The disputed part of the civil aviation security act was declared void. Basically, the court decided that a shoot-down could be legal if a flight vehicle is unmanned or there are only suspects on board. |
Protection of fundamental rights
| 1957 | 1 BvR 253/56 | Elfes-Decision (Elfes-Urteil) | Wilhelm Elfes, a left-wing member of the centre-right CDU, was accused of working against the constitution but was never convicted. Based on this indictment he was denied a passport multiple times. Elfes litigated against the decision. | The right to personal liberty is to be construed in a broad way.; Invention of "Heck's Formula" (named after the rapporteur of the case, Justice Heck). The court can only review cases if one of the following conditions applies: The impact of a constitutional norm was misjudged; Application of the law was discretionary; Judicial restraint was violated | Elfes lost his specific case but the court cemented personal liberty in general. Justice Heck defined the limits of the court relative to the specialised court system. |
| 1958 | 1 BvR 400/51 | Lüth Decision (Lüth-Urteil) | The court of Hamburg prohibited Erich Lüth to call for a boycott of the film Immortal Beloved. Lüth justified his action because director Veit Harlan also was responsible for the antisemitic movie Jud Süß in 1940. | The Basic Law binds private law indirectly.; The Federal Constitutional Court is not a regular appellate court on violation of federal law. The court only overviews violation of the Basic Law. | With the Lüth Decision the court defined and restricted its own power. But on the other hand, it expanded the effective range of the Basic Law beyond the tension of government and people to the private law. The Basic Law does not bind citizens but it binds the lawmakers in creating private law and the judiciary in interpreting it. |
| 2021 | 1 BvR 2656/18; 1 BvR 78/20; 1 BvR 96/20; 1 BvR 288/20 | (Klimaschutz) | In 2019 the German federal government implemented the Climate Protection Act, to transpose the Paris Agreement into German law. It defined CO2-reduction goals for 2030 but did not describe how to reach the 1.5 °C/2 °C limitation beyond that year. The German branch of Fridays for Future litigated against the law because it would put an undue burden to their freedom and the freedom of the generations to come. | The Basic Law binds legislation to protect the liberty of actual people as well as the freedoms of generations to come. Legislation has to implement laws in a way that does not put an undue burden on the liberty of young people or future generations. The decision was unanimous. | The court instructed the federal government to implement the law in a way that does not put most of the effort needed to reach the goals of the Paris Agreement to future generations. Personal liberty is not to be interpreted in a way that restricts the personal liberty of future generations inappropriately. |
Development of fundamental rights by the court
| 1983 | 1 BvR 209/83; 1 BvR 269/83; 1 BvR 362/83; 1 BvR 420/83; 1 BvR 440/83; 1 BvR 484/83 | Census Verdict (Volkszählungsurteil) | Citizens litigated against the German census 1983 | Personal freedom under modern conditions depends on the right to be protected against unlimited data processing, use, collection, storage and disclosure. There is nothing like irrelevant data. | The census was postponed to 1987 until the "census 1983 act" was changed corresponding to the verdict. The court created, by deriving from human dignity and personal liberty, a new civil right: informational self-determination. The verdict became the foundation of the modern German Data Protection Act (1990) and the EU Data Protection Directive (1998). |
| 2018 | 1 BvR 3080/09 | Stadium ban decision (Stadionverbots-Entscheidung) | Soccer Fan litigating against nationwide stadium ban | Mittelbare Drittwirkung applies to some powerful non-state organisations within some specific constellations, mandating the protection of individual right. | Higher requirements for the exclusion of individuals from some public events, indirect impact on the actions of large platforms. |
Freedom of expression
| 2000 | 1 BvR 1762/95 & 1 BvR 1787/95 | Benetton I | The Federal Court of Justice prohibited the magazine Stern to publish shocking advertisements of the Benetton Group. The advertisements showed a bird doused with oil, child labour and a bare buttock with a stamp: "HIV-positive". | The publishing of an opinion of a third party that is protected by freedom of expression is protected itself. | The case was remanded to the Federal Court of Justice whose new decision was challenged again as "Benetton II". |
Freedom of art
| 1971 | 1 BvR 435/68 | Mephisto judgment (Mephisto-Entscheidung) | The heir of Gustaf Gründgens successfully sued the publisher of the 1936 novel Mephisto by Gründgens' former brother-in-law Klaus Mann to stop publishing the book. It was prohibited by all lower courts. | Freedom of art is guaranteed by the Basic Law, but it finds its limit in human dignity and likewise in personality right. Because freedom of art is to be construed in a broad sense, weighing up has to be comprehensive and a case by case decision. | Due to a split decision the ban of the novel was upheld. It was the first decision of the court on the interpretation of freedom of art. Apart from the concrete decision, the court made clear that freedom of art cannot be limited by general laws. |

== Impact on European constitutional questions ==
On 12 September 2012, the Court stated that the question of whether the ECB's decision to finance European constituent nations through the purchase of bonds on the secondary markets was ultra vires because it exceeded the limits established by the German act approving the ESM was to be examined. This demonstrates how a citizen's group has the ability to affect the conduct of European institutions. On 7 February 2014, the Court made a preliminary announcement on the case, which was to be published in full on 18 March. In its ruling, the Court decided to leave judgment to the Court of Justice of the EU (CJEU).

In this regard, the ruling of 5 May 2020 deemed an act of the EU and the Weiss Judgment of the Court of Justice "ultra vires", for having exceeded the powers granted by the Member States. The EU decided to initiate infringement proceedings against Germany. In response to the notification, the German government provided the European Commission with satisfactory assurances. As a result, the case was closed in December 2021.

== See also ==
- List of justices of the Federal Constitutional Court
- Judiciary
- Rechtsstaat
- Rule according to higher law
- Rule of law
- Streitbare Demokratie
- Federal Office for the Protection of the Constitution
- Baumgarten-Bau

== Bibliography ==
- Allen, Christopher S. (10 February 2009). "Chapter 4: Germany". In Kesselman, Mark; Krieger, Joel; Joseph, William A (eds.). Introduction to Comparative Politics. Wadsworth. ISBN 978-0-495-79741-8.
- Law, David S. (2009). "The Anatomy of a Conservative Court: Judicial Review in Japan". Texas Law Review. 87: 1545–1593. SSRN 1406169.
- "Judgment Days: Germany's Constitutional Court". The Economist. 28 March 2009.
- Lenaerts, Koen; Gutman, Kathleen (2006). "'Federal Common Law' in the European Union: A Comparative Perspective from the United States". The American Journal of Comparative Law. 54 (1): 1–121. doi:10.1093/ajcl/54.1.1. JSTOR 20454486.
- Pruezel-Thomas. "The abortion issue and the federal constitutional court". German Politics. 2 (3).
- Johnson. "The federal constitutional court: Facing up to the strains of law and politics in the new Germany". German Politics. 3 (3).
