= Christine Hohmann-Dennhardt =

German politician and judge

Justice of the Federal Constitutional Court of Germany
- In office 11 January 1999 – 2 February 2011

Christine Hohmann-Dennhardt (born 30 April 1950) is a German politician and judge who served on the First Senate of the Federal Constitutional Court of Germany from 1999 until 2011.

== Biography ==
After being a lecturer for Labour at the University of Hamburg from 1975 to 1977, Hohmann-Dennhardt became a researcher at the Johann Wolfgang Goethe University in Frankfurt am Main. She earned her doctorate there in 1979.

From 1981 to 1984 she was a judge at the Sozialgerichten ("Social Courts") in Frankfurt am Main and Wiesbaden and the Landessozialgericht ("Country Social Courts") of Hessen. In 1984 she was appointed Director of the Wiesbaden Sozialgerichten and remained in that position until 1989. From 1988 to 1989 she was also a substitute member of the Hessen State Constitutional Court, Staatsgerichtshof des Landes Hessen.

From 1989 to 1991 she was a Dezernentin der Stadt (roughly, "City Councillor") of Frankfurt am Main under Lord Mayor Volker Hauff. In 1991 she was appointed State Minister of Justice in the Hessen state government under Minister-President Hans Eichel. From 1995 to 1999 she served as State Minister of Science and Arts.

=== Judge of the Federal Constitutional Court of Germany, 1999–2011 ===
From January 1999 to January 2011, Hohmann-Dennhardt served as judge on the First Senate of the Federal Constitutional Court of Germany. In that capacity, she was the court’s rapporteur on family law and therefore involved in various rulings on issues like the recognition of same-sex unions in Germany and the Transsexuals Act (TSG). When Evelyn Haas left the Bundesverfassungsgericht in 2006, Hohmann-Dennhardt was the only woman on the First Senate.

In January 2011, Hohmann-Dennhardt was succeeded by judge Gabriele Britz.

=== Member of the Board at Daimler, 2011–2015 ===
In 2011, Dieter Zetsche, chairman of Daimler AG's management board, asked Hohmann-Dennhardt to take charge of the company's compliance program. Daimler created her role at the company after hiring Louis Freeh, a former director of the Federal Bureau of Investigation, as an independent monitor, a post mandated by its settlement with U.S. regulators on foreign-bribery investigations.

Hohmann-Dennhardt set about discussing ethics with many of the company's 275,000 or so employees in town-hall style meetings. She also introduced and oversaw controls designed to help identify incidents of suspected bribery.

In 2013, Hohmann-Dennhardt’s contract was extended by another three years.

=== Member of the Board at Volkswagen, 2016–2017 ===
In October 2015, Europe's biggest carmaker Volkswagen named Hohmann-Dennhardt to the newly created post of board member for integrity and legal affairs; she was the first woman to join Volkswagen’s board.

In January 2017, it was announced that Hohmann-Dennhardt would be leaving her job barely a year after joining the company, due to differences in the understanding of responsibilities and future operating structures within the function she led. Hiltrud Werner was named as her successor.

== Other activities ==
=== Corporate boards ===
- Messe Frankfurt, Member of the Supervisory Board (2016–2017)
- Audi, Member of the Supervisory Board (2016–2017)

=== Non-profits ===
- Amadeu Antonio Foundation, Member of the Council
- Arbeiterwohlfahrt (AWO) Frankfurt chapter, Member of the Board of Trustees
- Dimitris Tsatsos Institute for European Constitutional Law at the FernUniversität Hagen, Member of the Board of Trustees
- Einstein Foundation Berlin, Member of the Board of Trustees
- Ernst Reuter Foundation for Advanced Study, Member of the Board of Trustees
- Friedrich Ebert Foundation, Member of the Board of Trustees
- German Institute for Economic Research, Department of Gender Studies, Member of the Circle of Supporters
- Humboldt University of Berlin, Member of the Board of Trustees
- International Willy Brandt Prize, Member of the Jury
- Ifo Institute for Economic Research, Member of the Board of Trustees
- Karlsruhe Institute of Technology, Member of the Board of Trustees
- Leibniz Association, Member of the Senate
- Max Planck Institute for Foreign and International Criminal Law, Member of the Board of Trustees
- Phi Delta Phi – Richard von Weizsäcker Inn Tübingen, Honorary Member
