= Reykjavík Index =

Index for gendered leadership perception

The Reykjavík Index for Leadership is a measure of how society perceives women and men in terms of their suitability for leadership, exploring how comfortable society is overall with female leadership. It was launched in 2018 as a partnership between Women Political Leaders and Verian, with the Index being presented for the first time by Michelle Harrison at the 2018 Global Women Leaders Forum in Reykjavík.

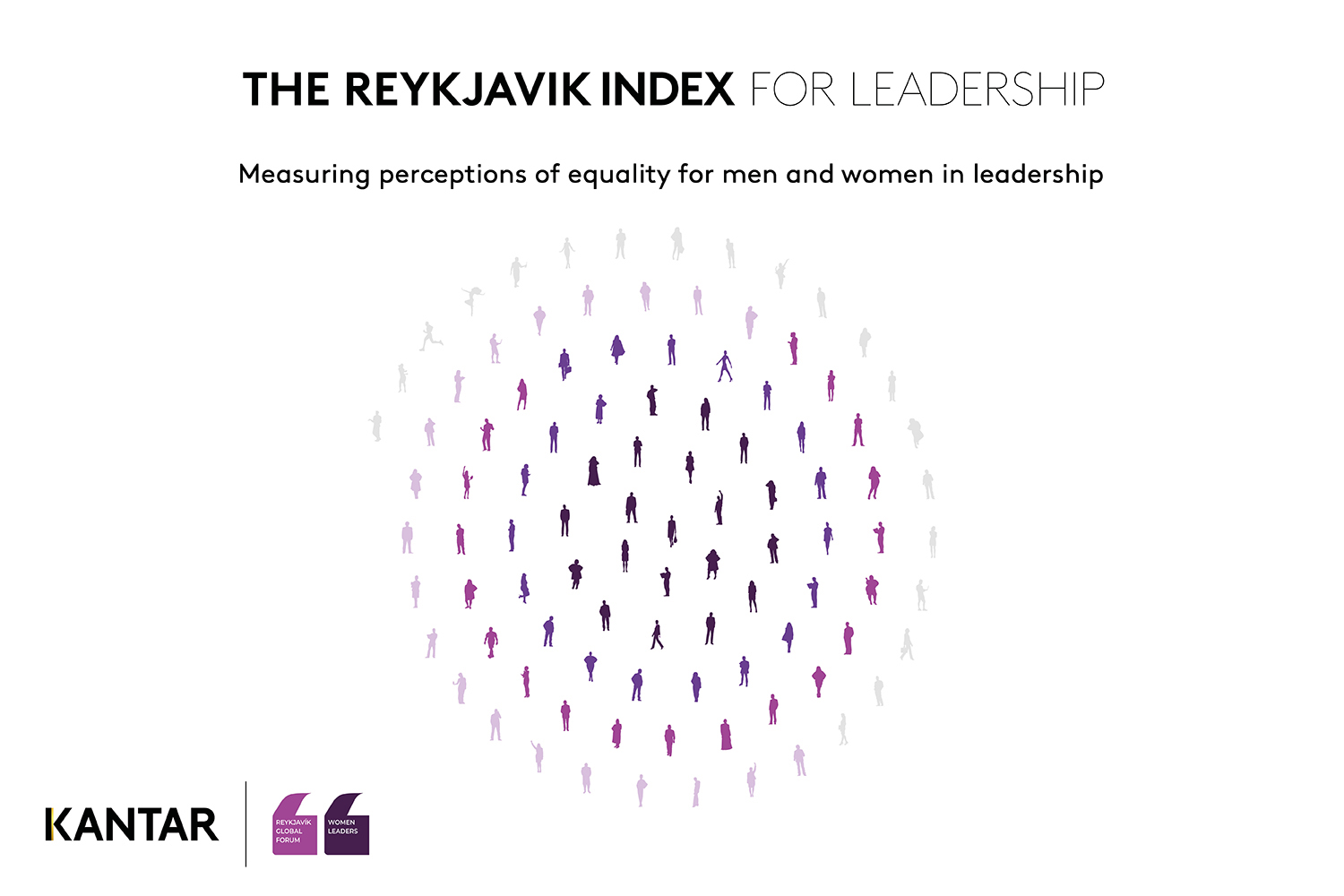
The Reykjavik Index for Leadership report 2020/21 - Cover Logo

The Index is designed to “better understand where there is prejudice in society’s perceptions of women and men in leadership, across 23 economic sectors”. It also gives insight into differences in attitudes between women and men and between age groups.

The methodology used to determine the Index is constructed based on research exploring the question, who is most suited to leadership positions: men, women or both equally?. The 2018/2019 and 2019/2020 reports cover the G7. The 2020/2021 report covers the G7 countries, as well as India, Kenya and Nigeria.

The 2024/2025 report continues to focus on G7, with a revival of Kenya and Nigeria in collaboration with the Gates Foundation.

== Background ==
Women Political Leaders and Kantar first partnered in 2018 to create the Reykjavík Index for Leadership. The first report was published in November 2018, the second in November 2019 and the third in November 2020. The next Reykjavík Index for Leadership report will be published in November 2025. 2024-2025 is the seventh year of findings.

The Reykjavík Index findings are presented each year in November at Women Political Leaders’ annual summit in Iceland, the Reykjavík Global Forum – Women Leaders. Women Political Leaders co-host the conference with the Government and Parliament of Iceland. They have also been shared during the World Economic Forum in Davos, UNGA and G7 summits.

The Reykjavík Index for Leadership is the first to measure the extent to which prejudice towards women and men in leadership prevails within the G7 countries and India, Kenya and Nigeria, providing a global view on this issue across different societies. The aim of The Reykjavík Index of Leadership is to quantify levels of comfort in society with the prospect of female leadership and to provide evidence of attitudes about equality to policy makers, business leaders and civil society.

== Dimensions ==
The Reykjavík Index for Leadership investigates society's attitudes towards leadership on a national level, but also looks at the dissonance between women and men and differences between age groups in the countries studied. It also offers a view of differences between the Index scores of different sectors at a country level.

=== National level research ===
The Index provides national level Index scores of the researched countries which can be compared over time. The national scores also allow for comparison between country-level scores as well as the calculation of a G7 average score.

=== Dissonance between men and women ===
An Index score is provided for women and men, across sectors and at a country level. This provides insight into the differences in attitudes of women and men towards equality in leadership. This difference is known as the dissonance.

=== Differences between age groups ===
Reykjavík Index scores allow for comparison between age groups.

The age groups are split into 18–34, 35-54 and 55-65-year old for all countries. An average for all age groups is calculated for the G7 group.

In the 2024 report, young people (age 18–34) in most countries measured held more prejudice than other age groups.

=== Sector differences at a country level ===
The 23 sectors that the Reykjavík Index for Leadership includes are:

- Aerospace
- Architecture
- Automotive Manufacture
- Banking and Finance
- Charity and Not-for Profit
- Childcare
- Defense and Police
- Economics and Political Science
- Education
- Engineering
- Fashion and Beauty
- Food and Drink Manufacture
- Foreign Affairs and Diplomacy
- Gaming
- Government and Politics
- Healthcare and Wellbeing
- High-Tech and Artificial Intelligence
- Intelligence Services
- International Sports Organizations
- Judiciary
- Media and Entertainment
- Natural Sciences
- Pharmaceutical and Medical Research

== Political and business advocates ==
The Reykjavík Index has featured in global events where political and business leaders have spoken to its utility and insights including:

- Jose Manuel Barroso, Prime Minister of Portugal (2002–2004), President of the European Commission (2004–2014), chair of the board, Gavi, The Vaccine Alliance
- Hanna Birna Kristjansdottir, Senior Advisor on Women's Leadership, UN Women
- Stephanie Buscemi, Salesforce CMO
- Ann Cairns, Vice Chair, Mastercard
- Helen Clark, Prime Minister of New Zealand (1999–2008); Administrator of the United Nations Development Programme (2009–2017)
- Obiageli Ezkwesili, Federal Minister of Education, Nigeria (2006–2007), former World Bank Vice President for Africa
- Peter Limbourg, Director General of Deutsche Welle
- Christy Tanner, Executive Vice President and General Manager of CBS News Digital
- Hiltrud Werner, Head, Integrity and Legal Affairs at Volkswagen
- Saadia Zahidi, Head, Centre for the New Economy and Society, Member of the Managing Board, World Economic Forum
- Uzra Zeya, Under Secretary of State for Civilian Security, Democracy, and Human Rights of the United States
- Jane Geraghty, Global CEO, Landor and Fitch
- Anne-Birgitte Albrectsen, CEO Plan International

== Methodology ==
The Reykjavík Index for Leadership is constructed based on research exploring the question: “For each of the following sectors or industries, do you think men or women are better suited to leadership positions?”. The question allows responses of ‘men’, ‘women’ or ‘both equally’ for 23 different economic and professional sectors.

A response of ‘both equally’ results in a point for that country within the Index, while a response of ‘men better suited’, ‘women better suited’ does not. ‘Don’t know’ is excluded from the Index score.

A country's Reykjavík Index for Leadership is equal to the average proportion of people selecting ‘both equally’ across the 23 economic sectors. This is a measure of the extent to which, across society, men and women are viewed to be equally suitable for leadership.

When average scores are presented (e.g. G7), each country's index is weighted equally regardless of population size.
