= Jean-François Jacqueminot =

French general (1787–1865)

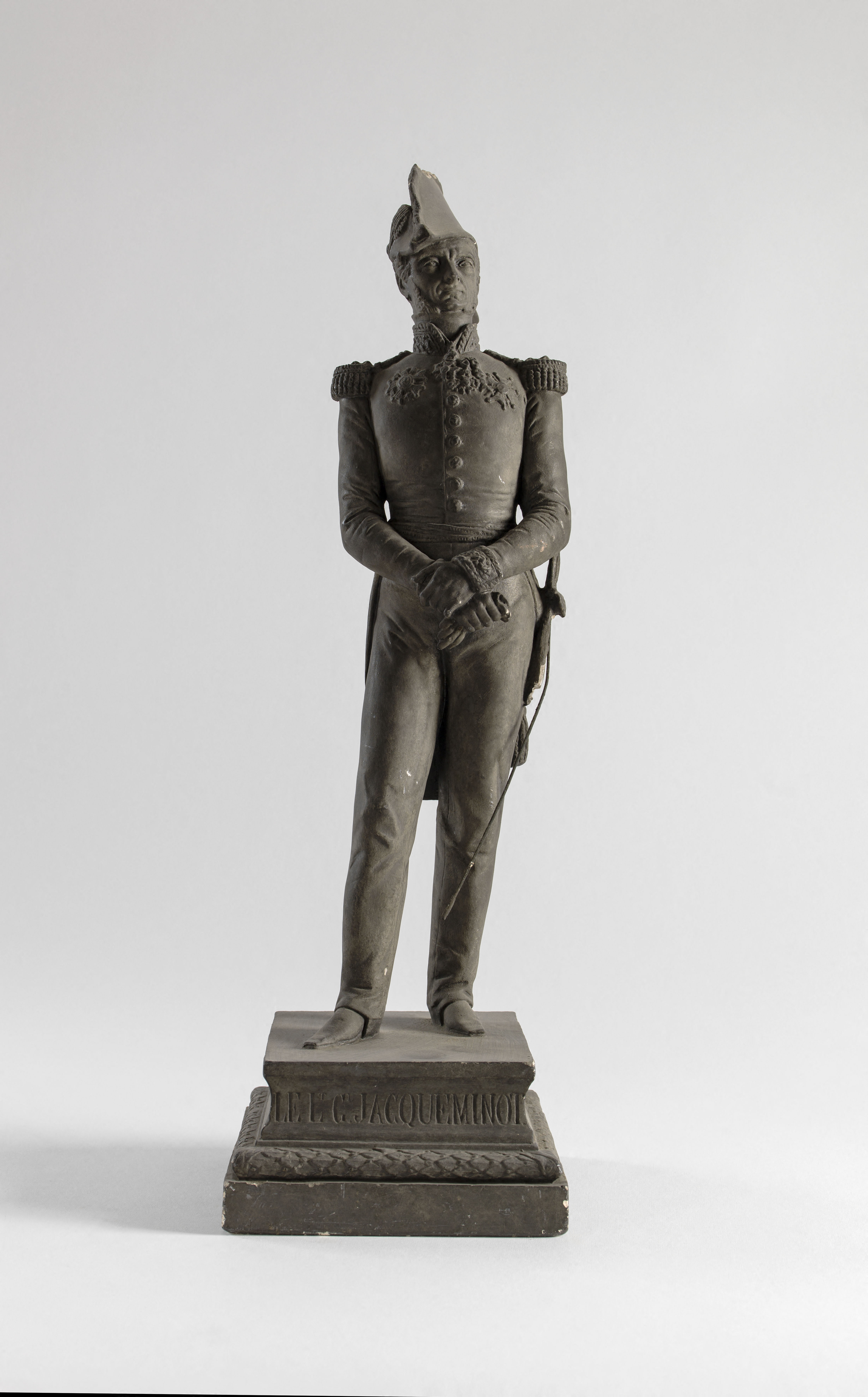

Jean François Jacqueminot, viscount of Ham (French pronunciation: [ʒɑ̃ fʁɑ̃swa ʒakmino]; 23 May 1787 – 3 March 1865) was a French general and political leader.

He was born at Nancy, studied at the École Militaire, entered the army in 1803, and distinguished himself at the battles of Austerlitz, Essling, Wagram, and the Beresina. In 1814, he was promoted colonel. When Napoleon returned from Elba, Jacqueminot was made commander of lancers. He made a brilliant charge at Quatre Bras and after Waterloo refused transfer to the service of the Bourbons and was imprisoned for a month. After his release, Jacqueminot established at Bar-le-Duc a great silk factory, which gave employment to many of the veterans of the French Imperial Army. Elected to the House of Deputies in 1827, he joined in the protest of the Two Hundred and Twenty-one against Polignac, and with Pajol directed the Rambouillet expedition which led Charles X to leave France. In 1842, he succeeded Chaud as commander of the National Guards of the Seine. Louis Philippe made him Viscount in 1846. His indecision at the head of the Guards made possible the revolution of 1848 and he was retired the same year.

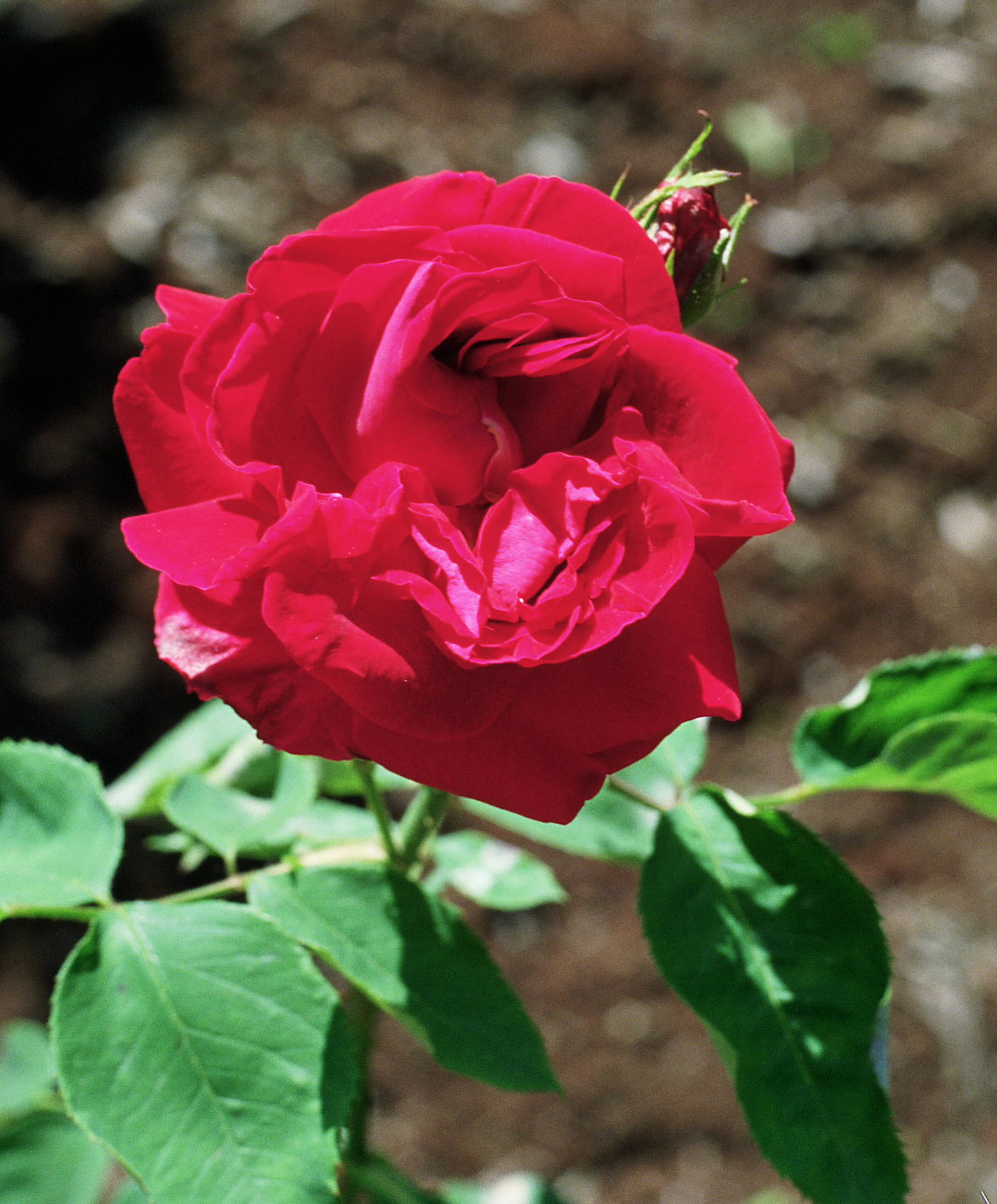
'Général Jacqueminot' (Roussel/Rousselet 1853)

He died at the age of 78 in 1865.

In 1853, Rousselet named a red rose cultivar 'Général Jacqueminot' in his honour. This flower is used as the official flower of the Alpha Omicron Pi sorority across the United States. In a 1967 essay, “The Young Founders of Alpha Omicron Pi,” PIP Mary D. Drummond wrote,

“[I was asked] whether the Founders were influenced by a poem, a novel. Stella says that the rose was chosen because of its age, beauty, and color. It typifies the Unfolding Spirit of AOII. [That spirit] is a process, as is the unfolding of the rose.”
