= Gabriele Britz =

German judge

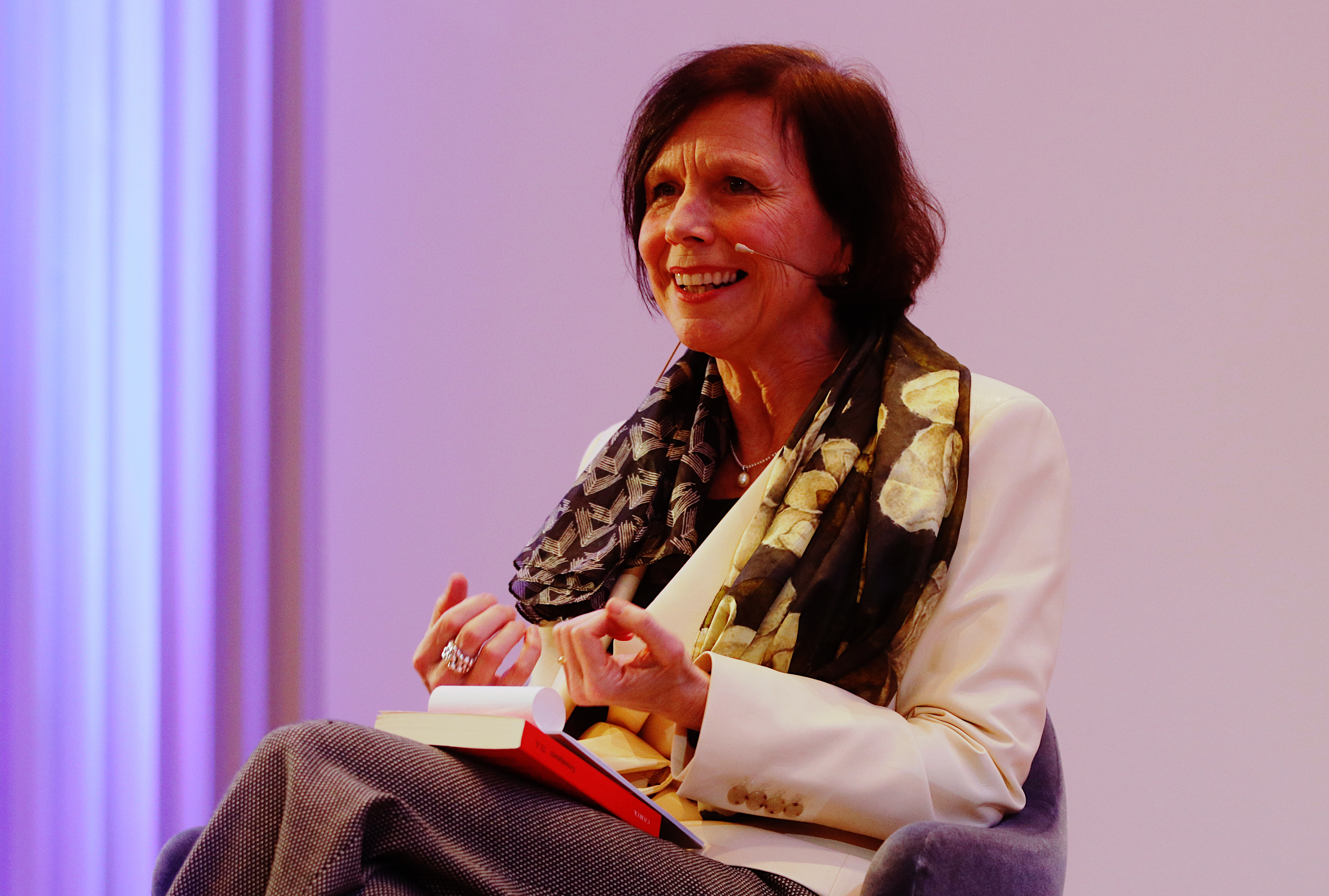
- Gabriele Britz, 2026

Justice of the Federal Constitutional Court of Germany
- In office 2 February 2011 – 2023
- Nominated by: SPD
- Preceded by: Christine Hohmann-Dennhardt

Personal details
- Born: Gabriele Britz; 1 October 1968 (age 58) Seeheim-Jugenheim, West Germany (now Germany)
- Education: Goethe University Frankfurt

Garbiele Britz (born 1 October 1968) is a German jurist who served as a justice of the Federal Constitutional Court and is a professor for Public law and European Union law at the University of Giessen.

== Judicial career ==
On 17 December 2010 she was elected by the Bundesrat on the proposal of the SPD to succeed Christine Hohmann-Dennhardt, who retired from the first Senate in January 2011, as a judge of the Federal Constitutional Court in Karlsruhe. She took up the post on 2 February 2011 and retired 2023.

== Personal life ==
Britz is married to Frankfurt local politician Bastian Bergerhoff (Bündnis 90/Die Grünen). They have a son together.
