= Evelyn Haas =

German judge and Honorary Professor of Law

Justice of the Federal Constitutional Court of Germany
- In office 14 September 1994 – 2 October 2006
- Succeeded by: Wilhelm Schluckebier

Evelyn Haas, born Evelyn Traeger (born 7 April 1949) is a German former First Senate Constitutional Court judge and current Honorary Professor of Law. She was the first woman to be elected to the Constitutional Court in Germany.

== Biography ==
After receiving her doctorate in 1974, Haas became a judge in Lower Saxony. She was at the Administrative Court for ten months, then seconded to the local government in Wolfsburg. From 1982 to 1986 she was seconded as a research assistant at the Federal Government of Germany and from 1986 to 1990, a judge at the Higher Administrative Court of Lüneburg. From 1987 to 1990 she was also Head of Unit in the Lower Saxony State Chancellery.

From September 1994 she was in the First Senate of the Bundesverfassungsgericht (Federal Constitutional Court of Germany). Her twelve-year term ended in 2006 and Wilhelm Schluckebier succeeded her.

She was responsible for certain areas of German tax law, development law, construction law, land law, the German expropriation law, land transport and urban development. She was a planning law specialist, except for environment law. She had input on several landmark case law decisions, sometimes dissenting from her colleagues.

With her departure, only one woman (Christine Hohmann-Dennhardt) sat on the German First Senate. This led to a debate about whether women are still at a disadvantage in the German legal system.

Since 2002 she has taught as an Honorary Professor at Eberhard-Karls-Universität, Tübingen.
