= Phi Delta Phi =

International legal honor society

- ΦΔΦ
- Crest of Phi Delta Phi
- Founded: December 13, 1869; 156 years ago University of Michigan Law School
- Type: Honor society (formerly professional fraternity until 2012)
- Affiliation: Independent
- Former affiliation: PFA
- Status: Active
- Scope: International
- Motto: "Friends of Justice and Wisdom"
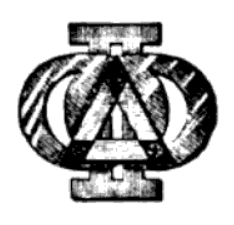
- Member badge
- Colors: Garnet and Pearl Blue
- Symbol: Owl and Skull
- Flower: Jacqueminot rose
- Publication: The Brief
- Chapters: 131
- Members: 200,000+ lifetime
- Headquarters: 1426 21st Street NW; Washington, D.C. 20036-5947; United States
- Website: www.phideltaphi.org

Phi Delta Phi (ΦΔΦ; commonly known as Phid or PDP) is a law-student honor society and professional fraternity founded in 1869 at the University of Michigan.

Phi Delta Phi is organized by two branches: legal honor societies and pre-law societies. The legal honor societies, called Inns, are located at law schools. The pre-law societies, called Halls, are for undergraduate membership at U.S. colleges and universities.

With a total membership of over 200,000 people, members of Phi Delta Phi include five U.S. presidents, two U.S. vice presidents, 14 Supreme Court justices, and numerous members of Congress, Cabinet members, and ambassadors.

== History ==
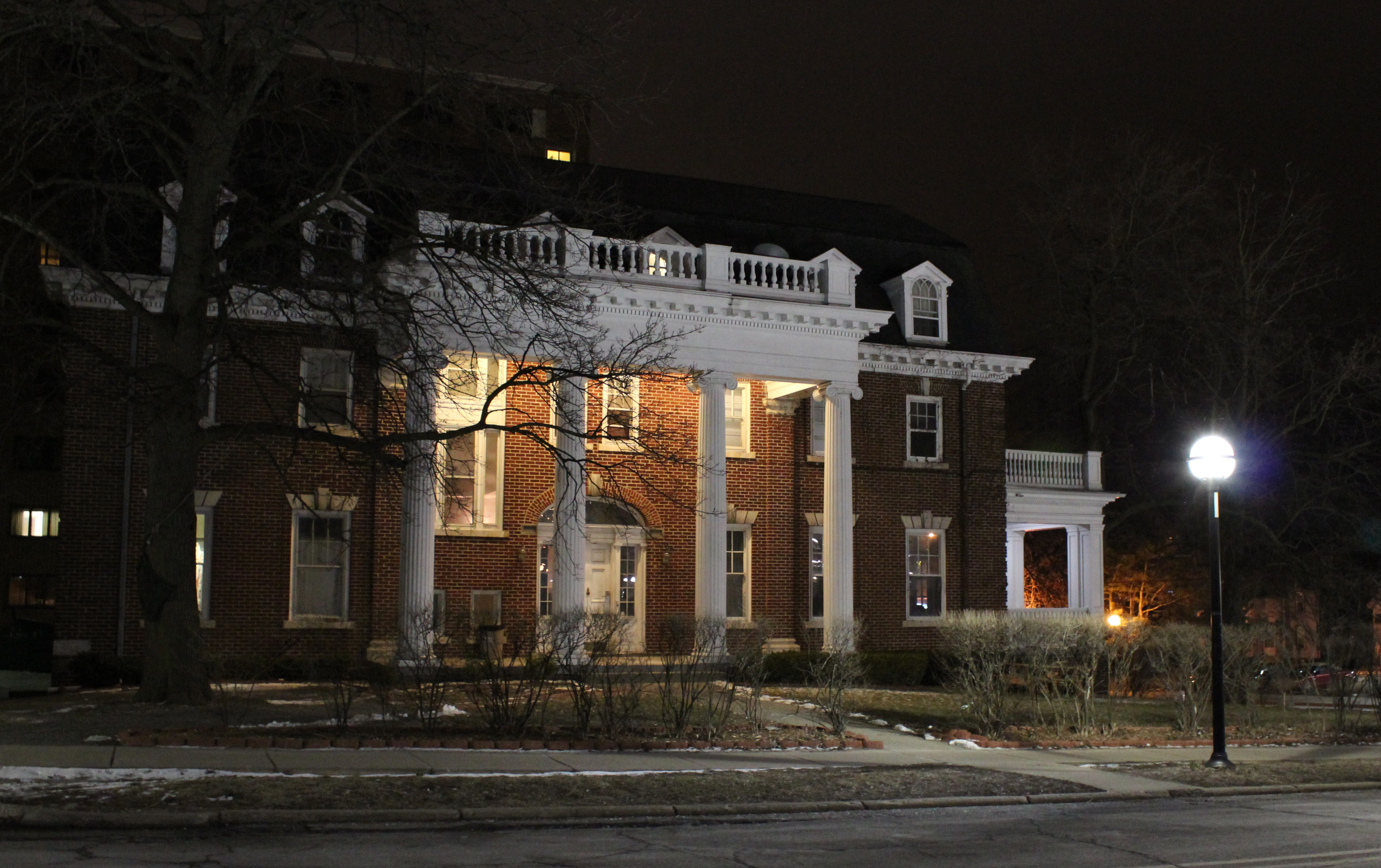
Phi Delta Phi fraternity house built in 1917 located at the University of Michigan in Ann Arbor, Michigan

Phi Delta Phi was founded on December 13, 1869 at the University of Michigan Law School by John M. Howard, a first year law student. Howard was a graduate of Monmouth College and member of Phi Gamma Delta. His initial intent was to found a chapter of Phi Gamma Delta at Michigan, but he did not follow through with the plan because of the large number of chapters already in place on the campus. Howard instead turned his efforts toward founding a fraternity devoted purely to students of the legal profession.

Phi Delta Phi Inns have occasionally leased or owned residential buildings or secured meeting spaces, often adjacent to law libraries. During World War II, when law school admissions enrollments virtually ceased, all of the Inns remained active on a restricted basis.

The first international unit of the fraternity was the Weldon Inn, chartered in 1925 at Dalhousie University in Nova Scotia. The first unit in Mexico, the Velasco Inn, was chartered in 1973 at the Escuela Libre de Derecho, in Mexico City. The first unit in Germany, the Roman Herzog Inn, was chartered in 2006 at the Bucerius Law School, in Hamburg.

After 140 years of operation as a professional fraternity, the fraternity was designated as an honor society in 2012. In the same year the fraternity began chartering Halls as undergraduate pre-law chapters.

=== Symbols ===
Phi Delta Phi's motto is "Friends of Justice and Wisdom". Its colors are garnet and pearl blue. Its symbols are the owl and skull. Its flower is the Jacqueminot rose. Its publication is The Brief.

=== Chapters ===
Phi Delta Phi has 131 active chapters known as Inns. Each Inn is named for a noted jurist or member of the bar. The honor society has numerous undergraduate chapters, called Halls.

== Notable members ==
Over more than one and a half centuries, Phi Delta Phi members have contributed significantly to various areas, specifically the law and politics. Phi Delta Phi's affiliates include five U.S. presidents, two U.S. vice presidents, and fourteen Supreme Court justices.

Notable Phi Delta Phi members include:

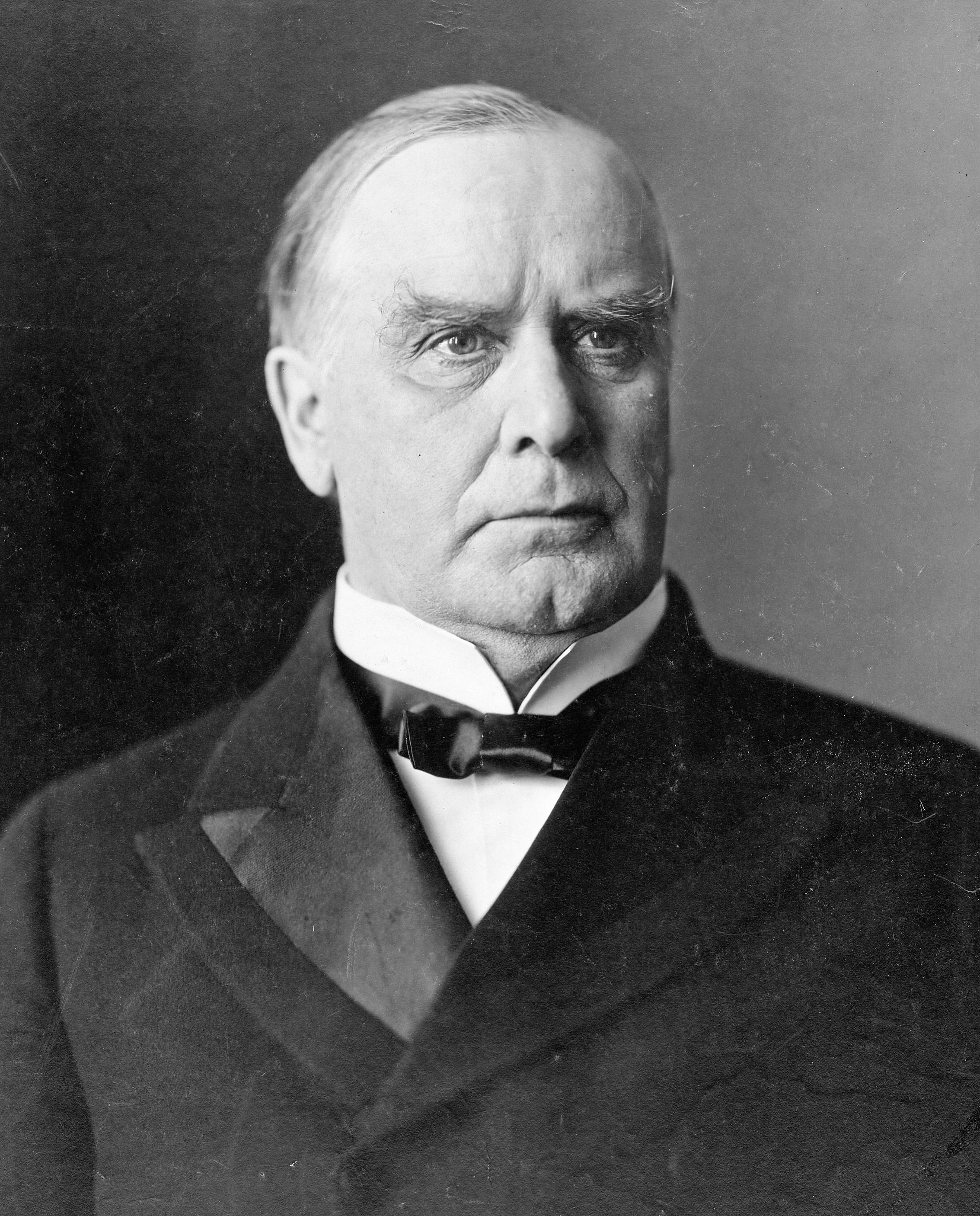
25th President of the United States William McKinley

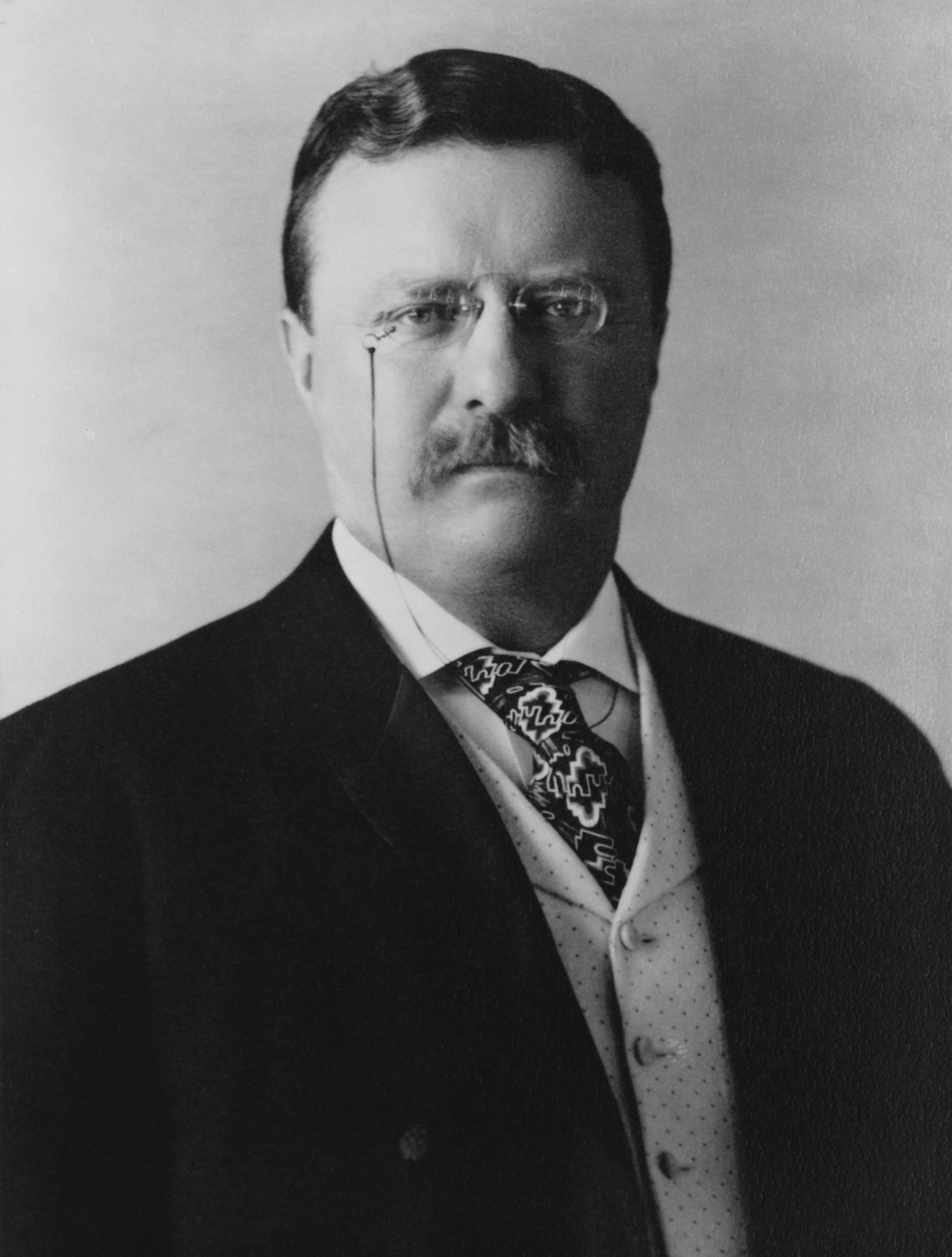
26th President of the United States Theodore Roosevelt

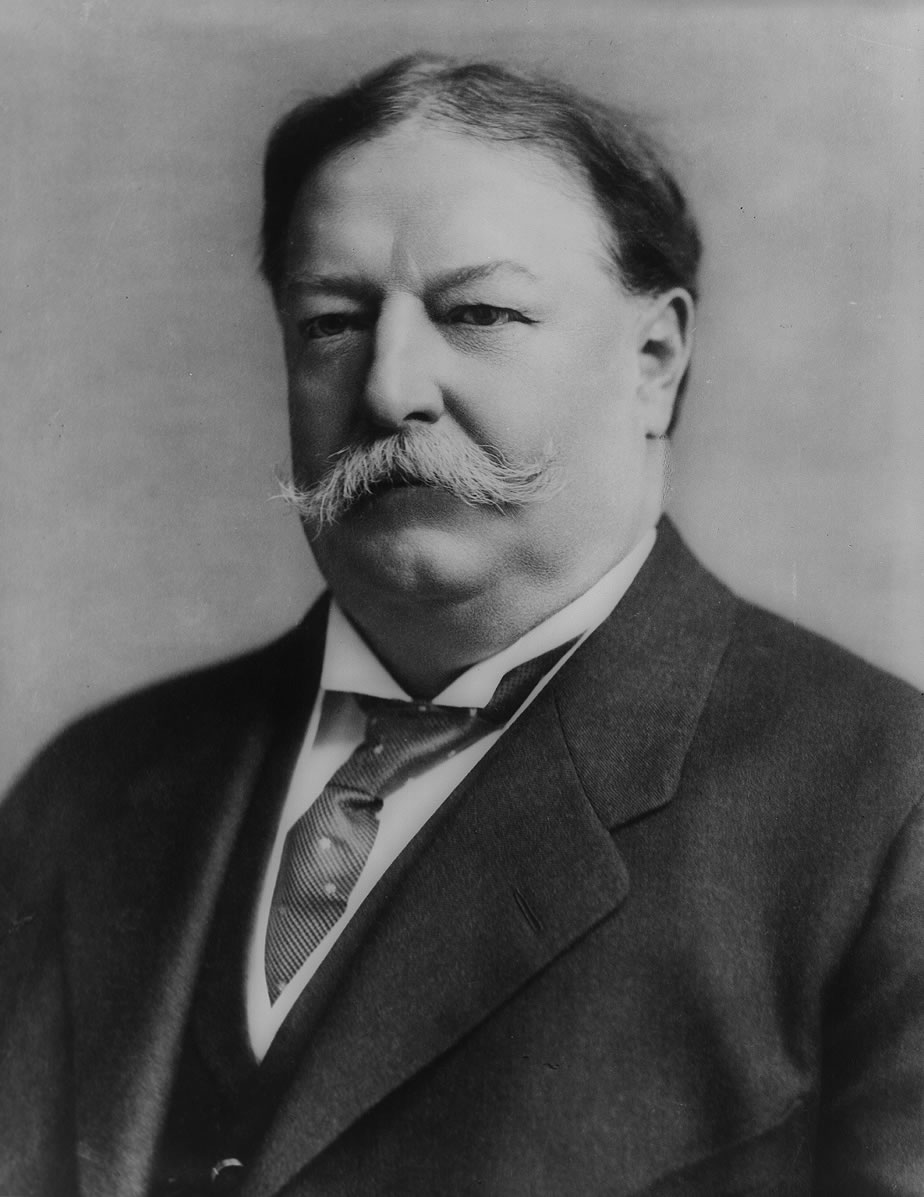
27th President of the United States William H. Taft

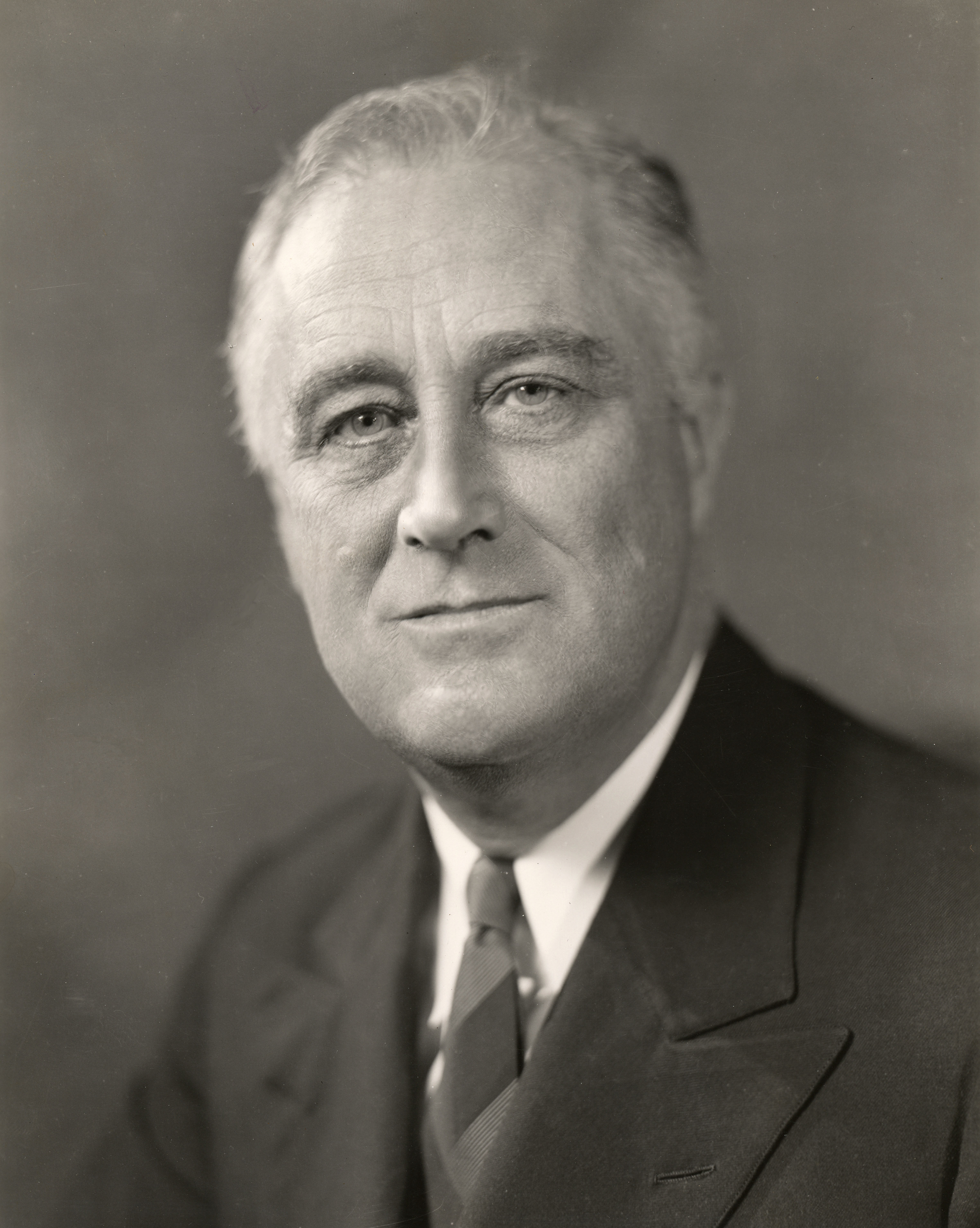
32nd President of the United States Franklin D. Roosevelt

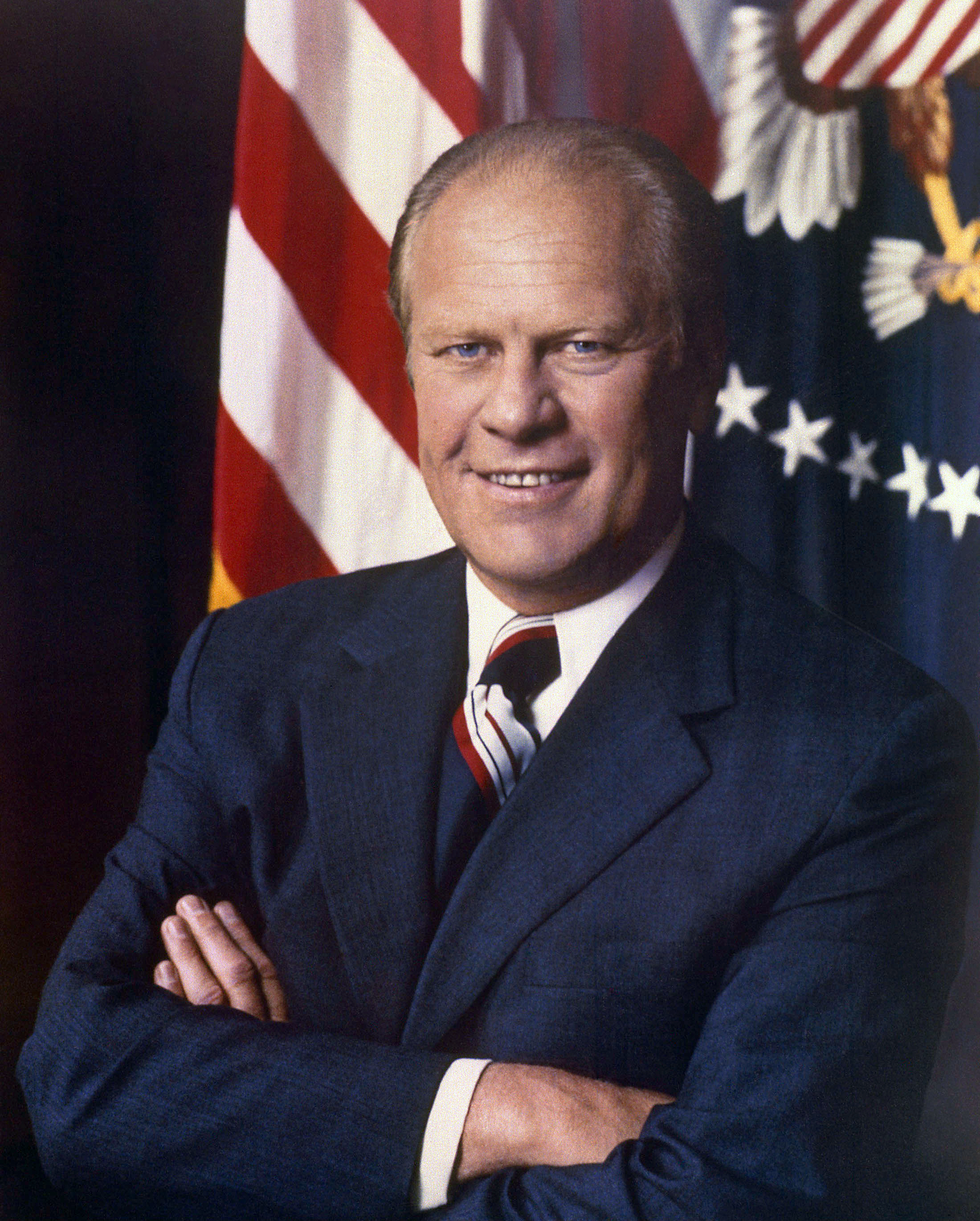
38th President of the United States Gerald Ford

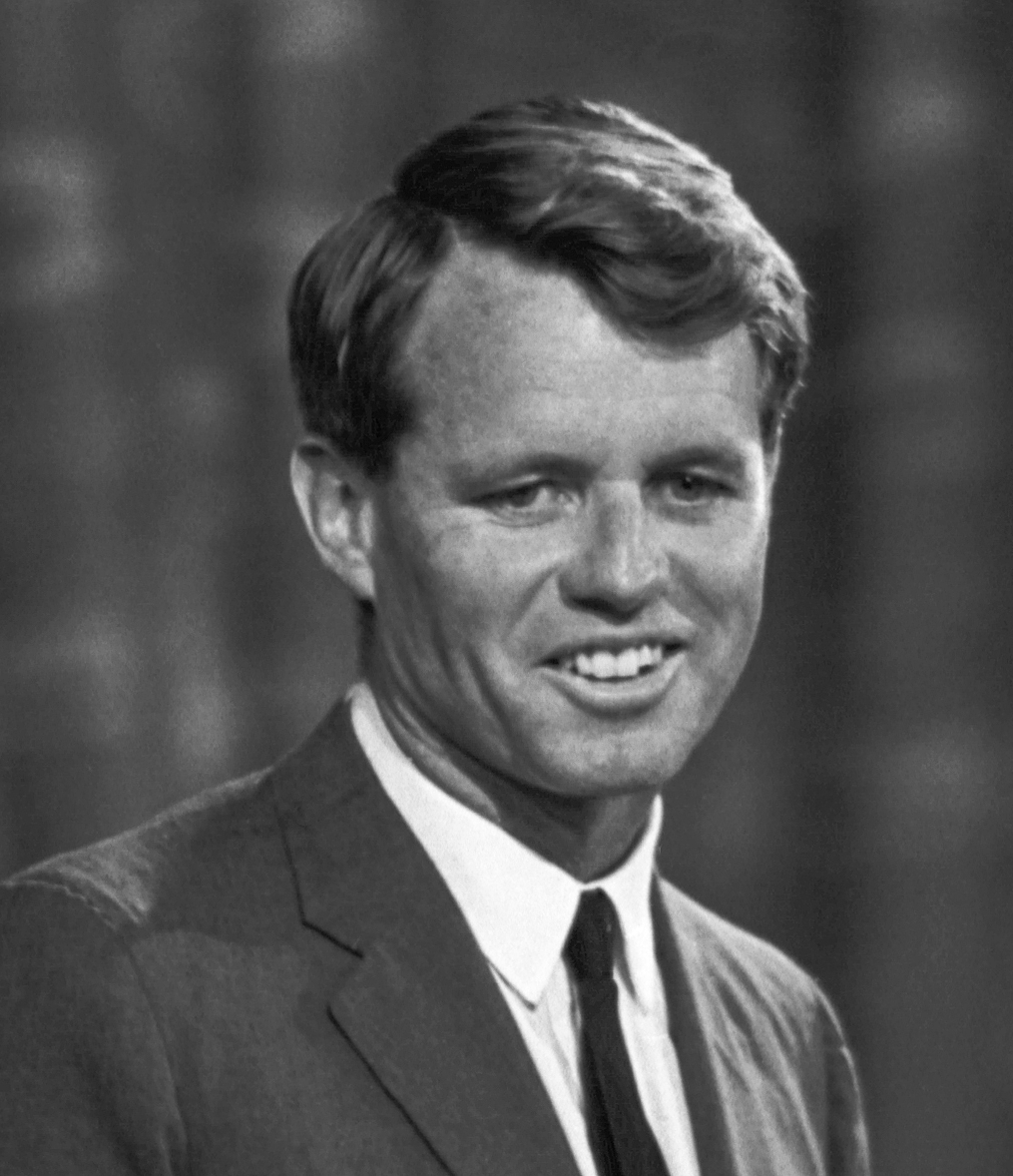
United States Senator Robert F. Kennedy

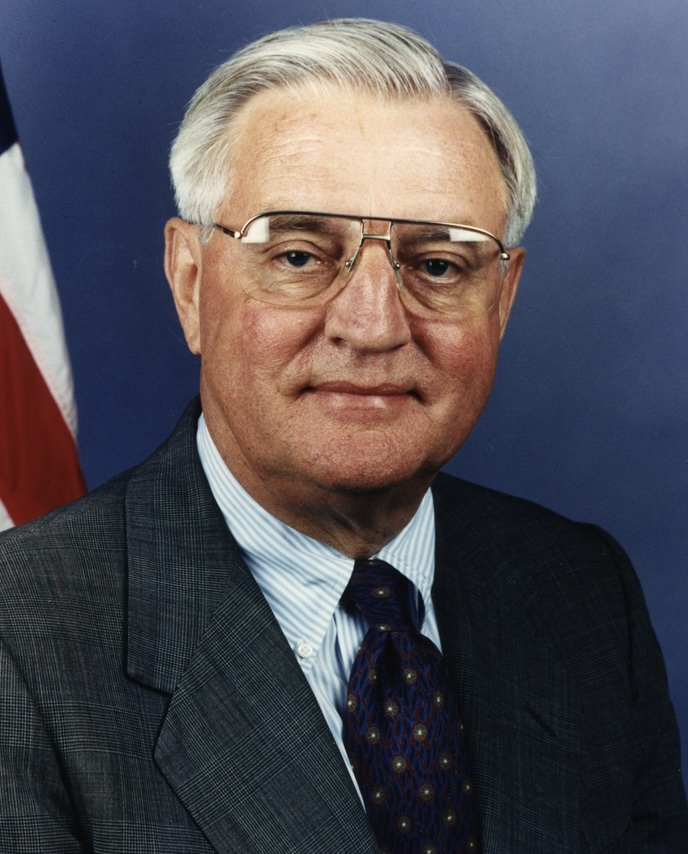
42nd Vice President of the United States Walter Mondale

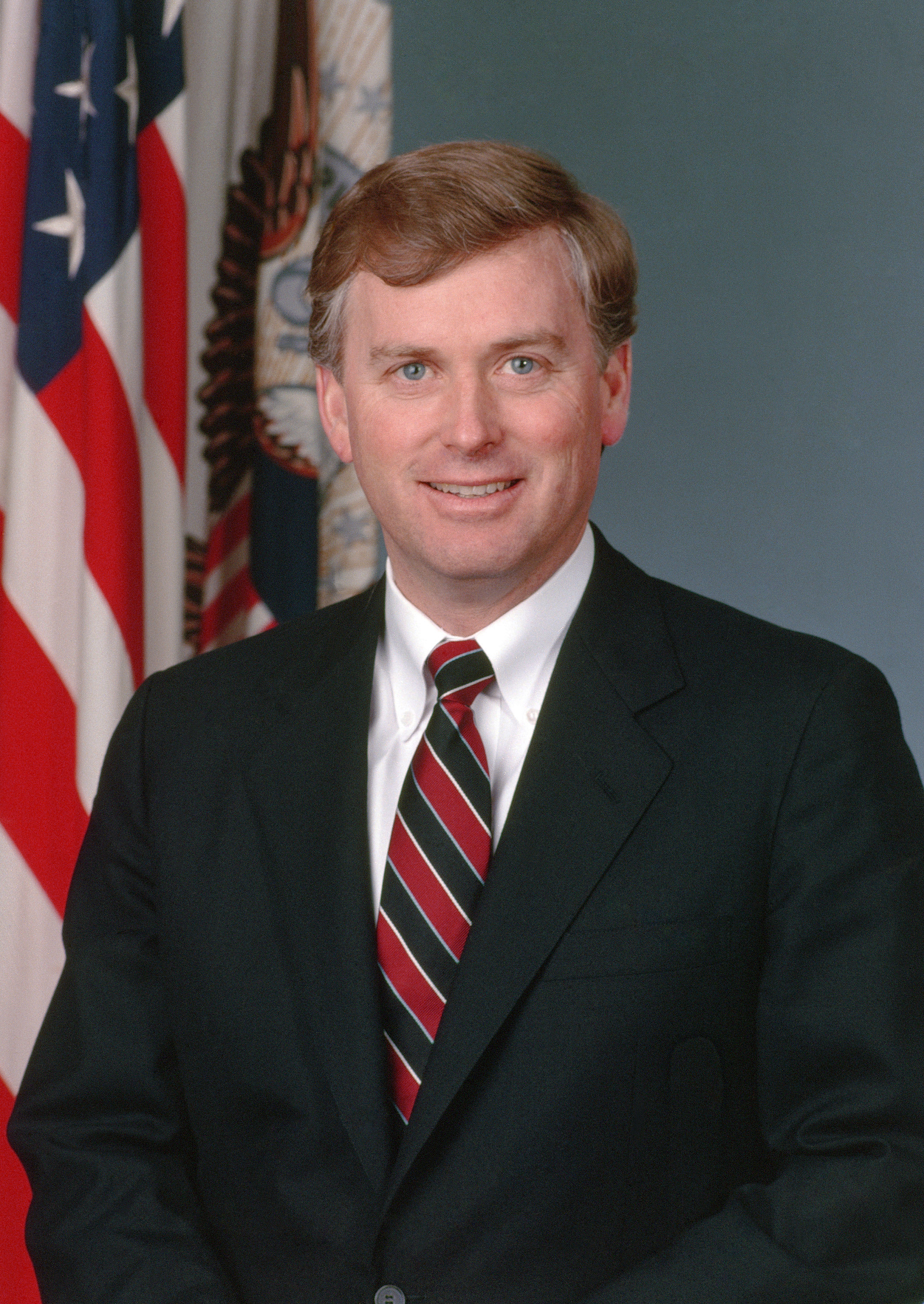
44th Vice President of the United States Dan Quayle

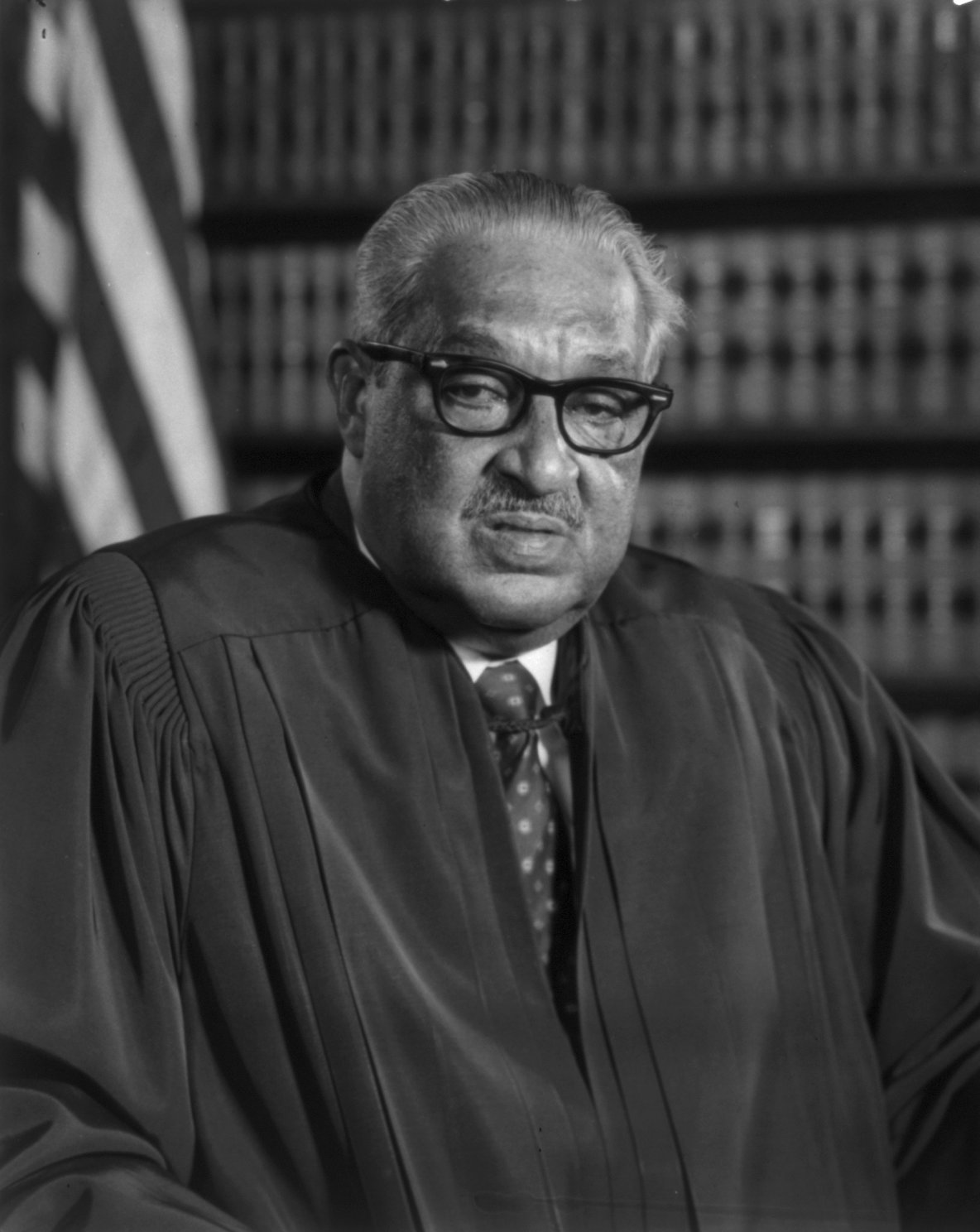
Associate Justice of the United States Thurgood Marshall

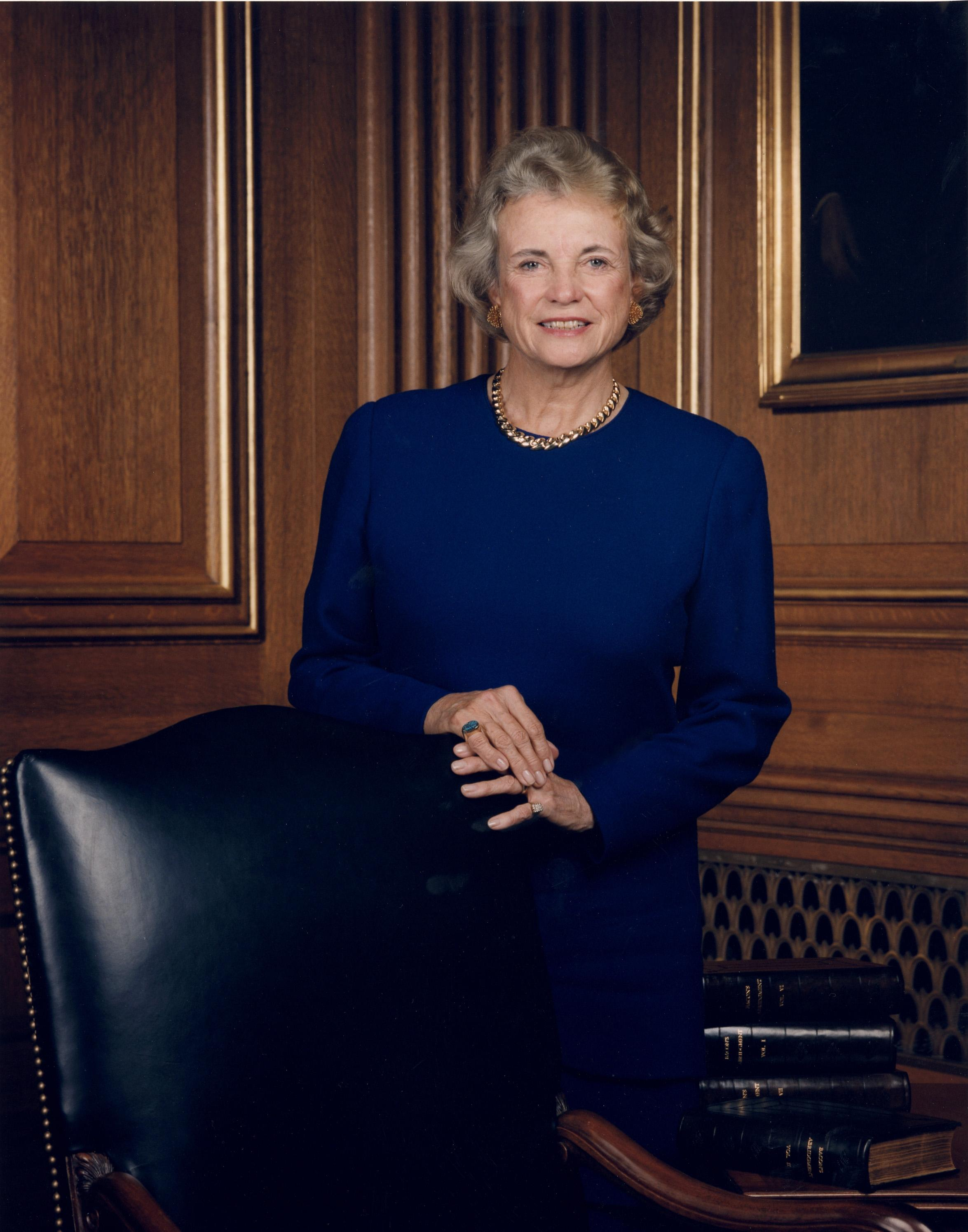
Associate Justice of the United States Sandra Day O'Connor

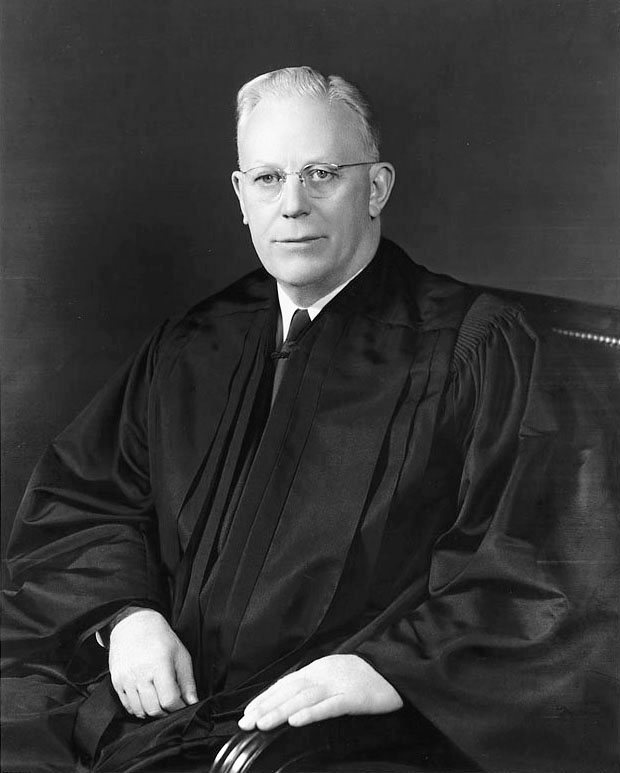
Chief Justice of the United States Earl Warren

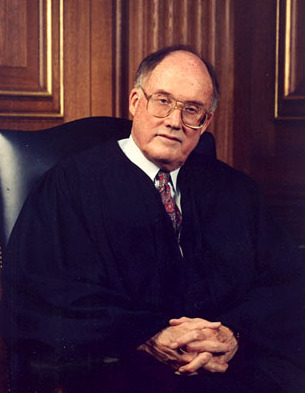
Chief Justice of the United States William Rehnquist

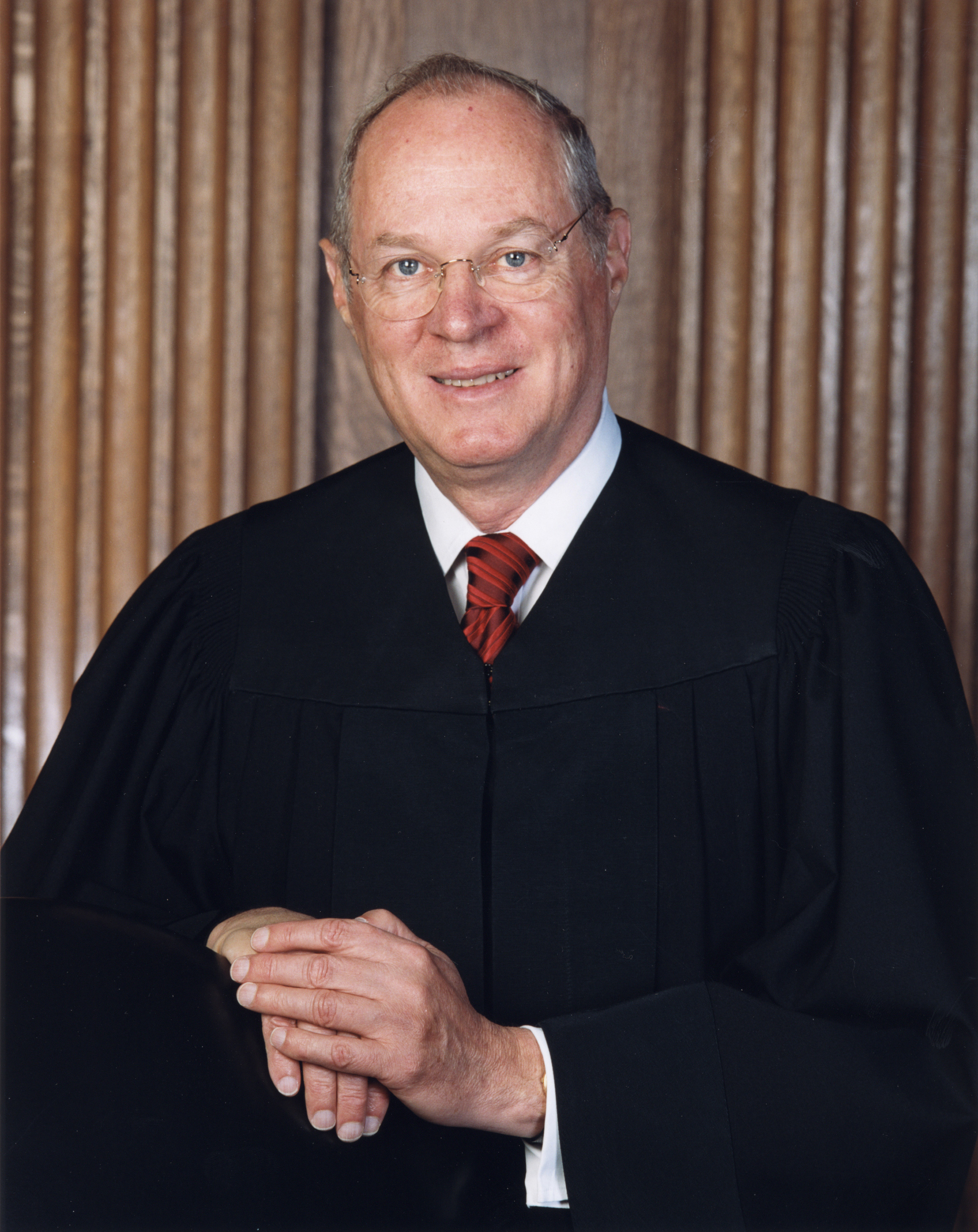
Associate Justice of the United States Anthony Kennedy

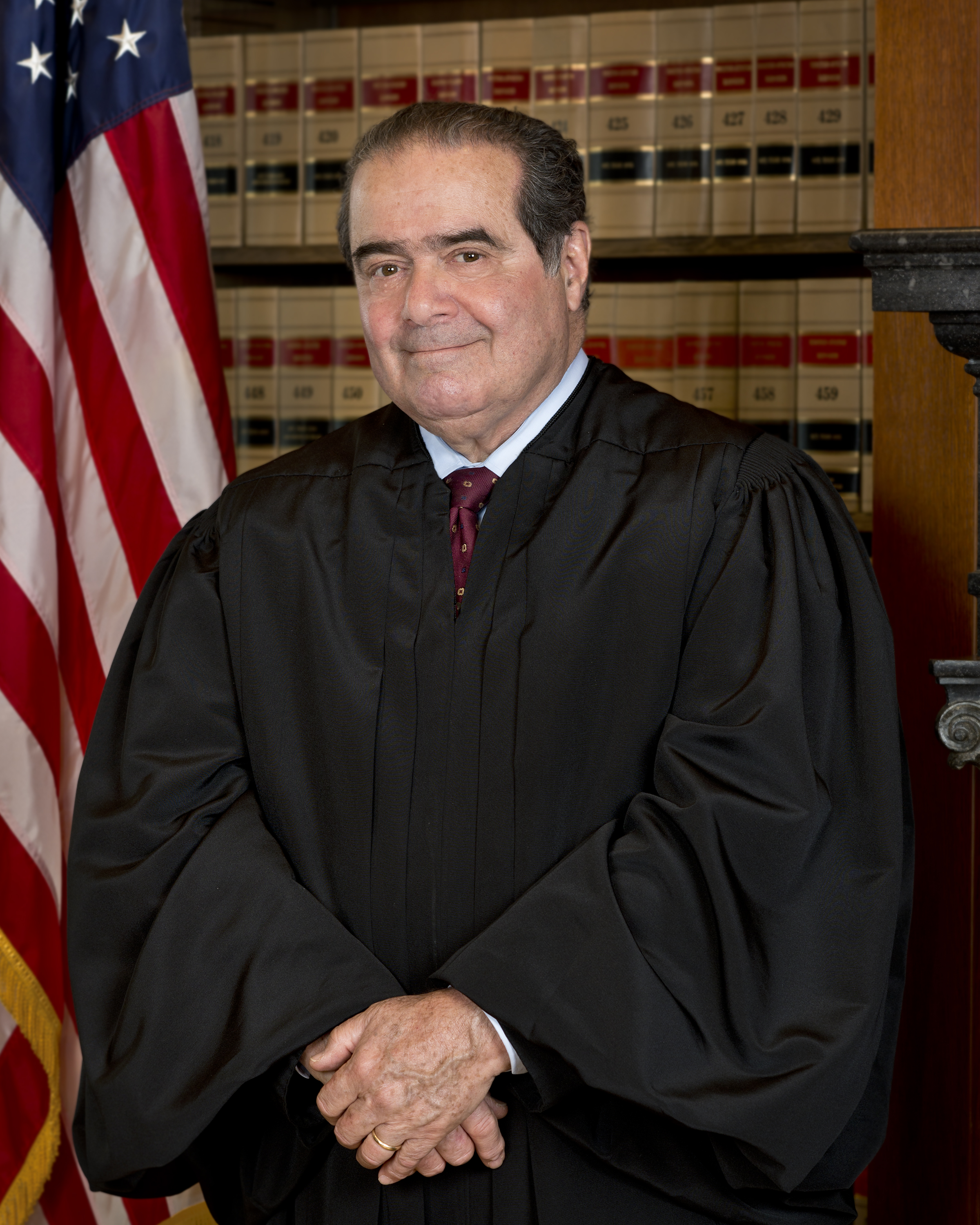
Associate Justice of the United States Antonin Scalia

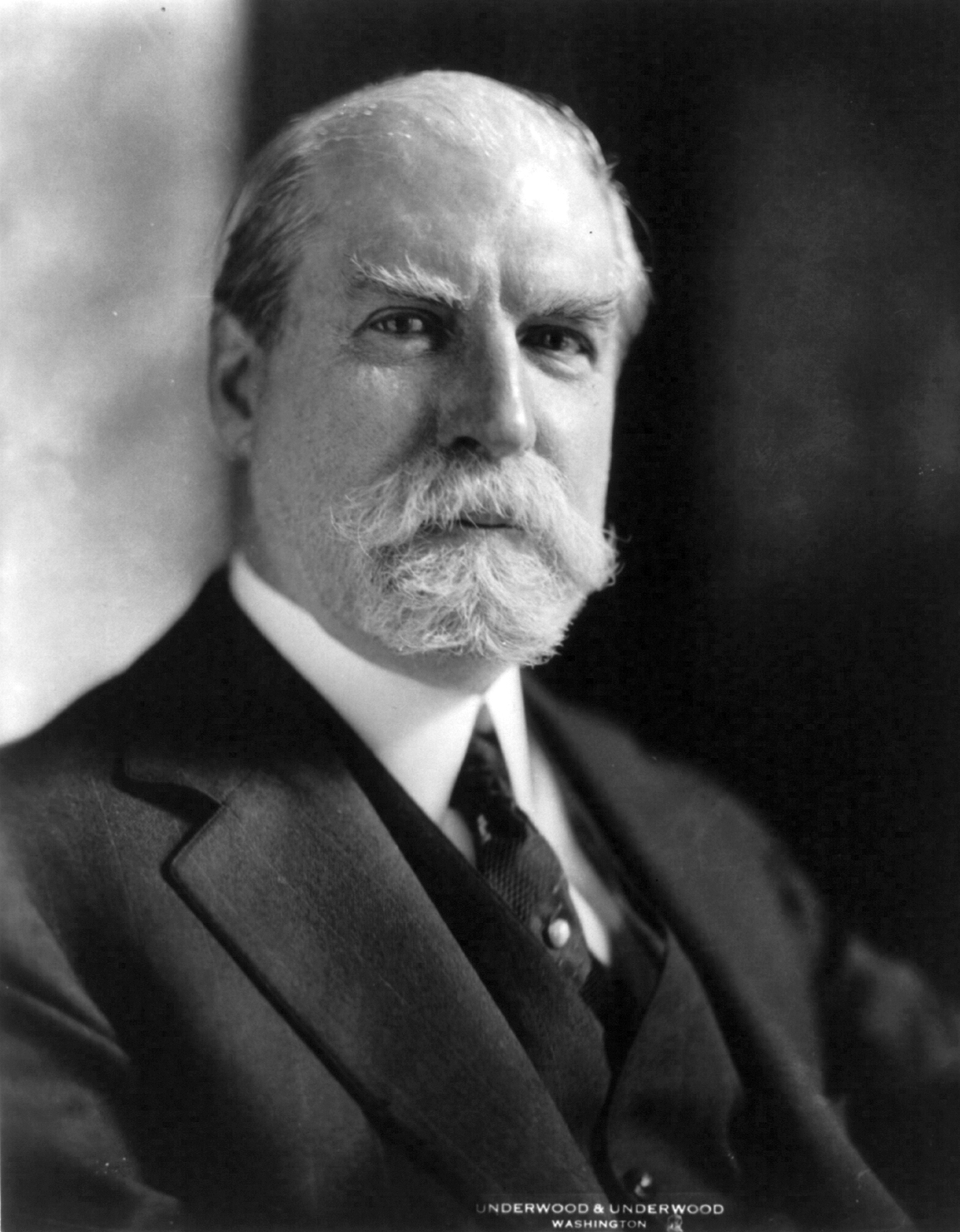
Chief Justice of the United States Charles Evans Hughes

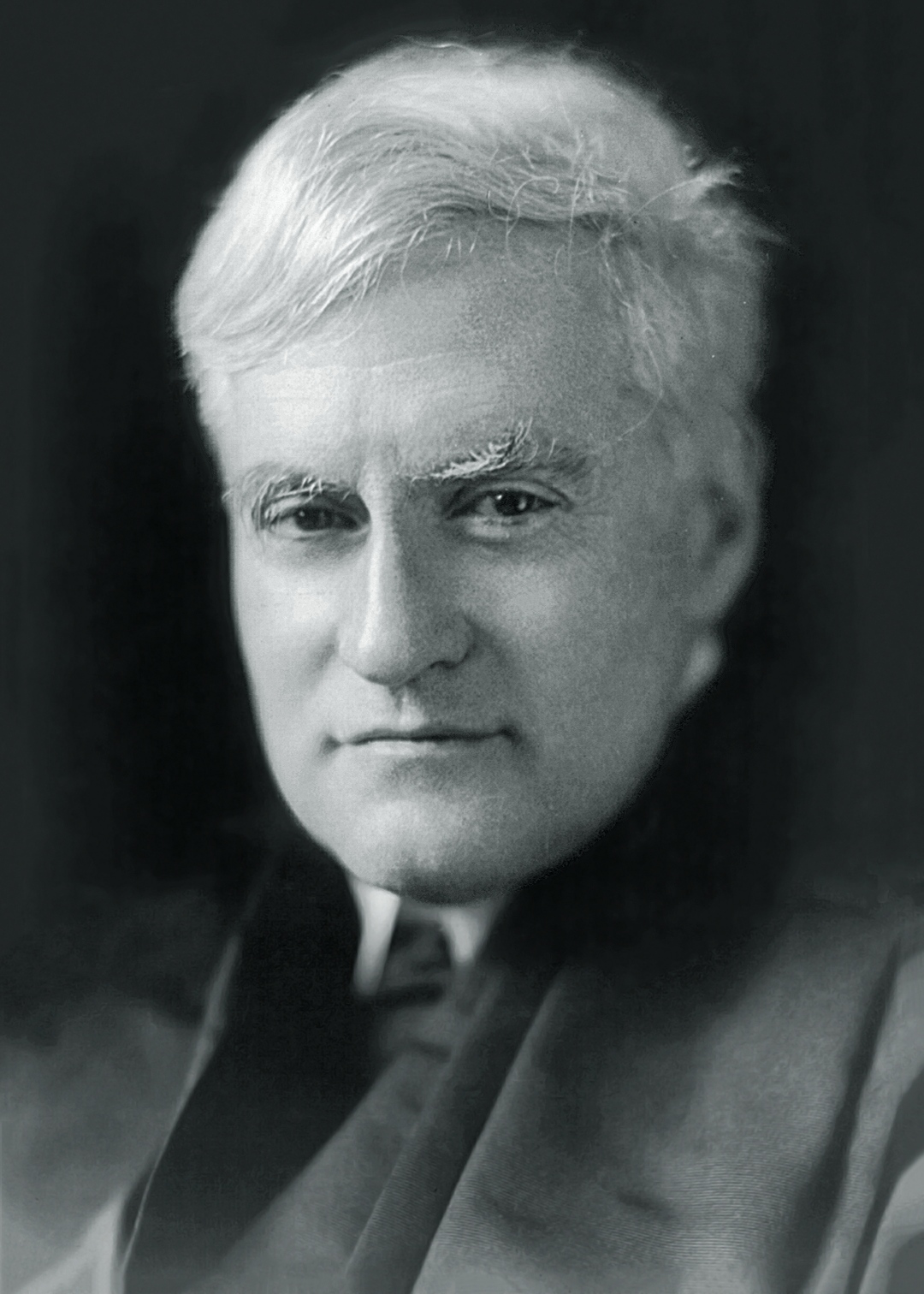
Associate Justice of the United States Benjamin N. Cardozo

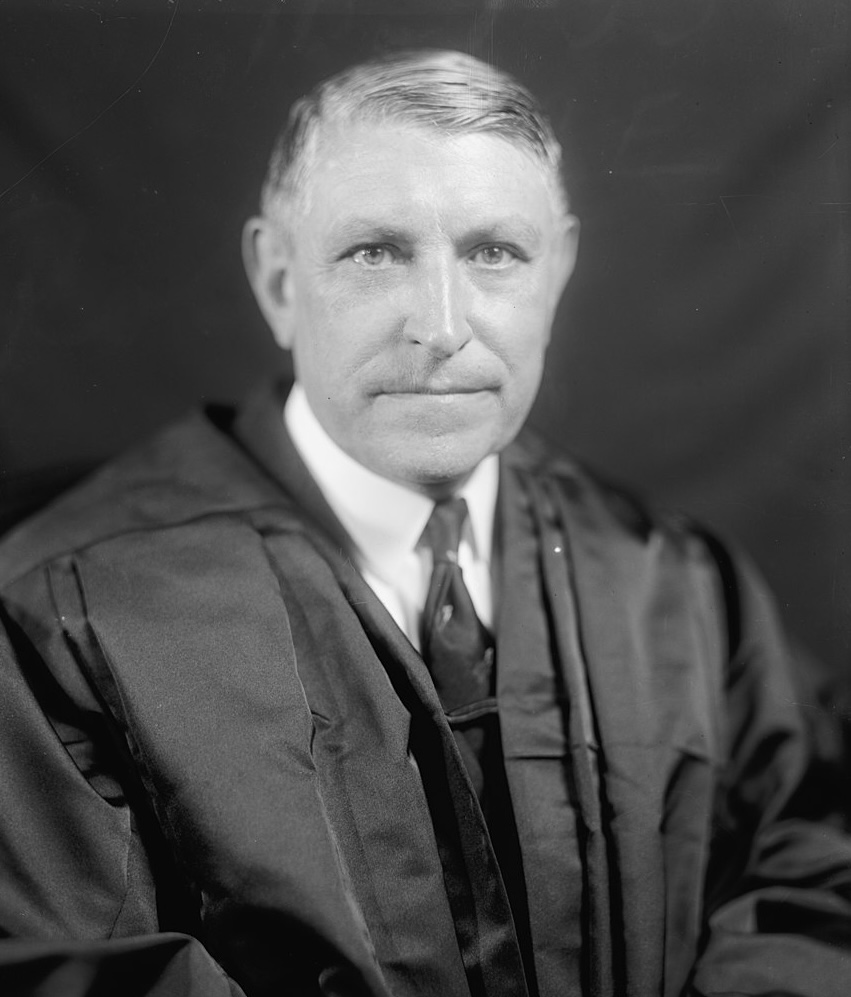
Associate Justice of the United States Owen Roberts

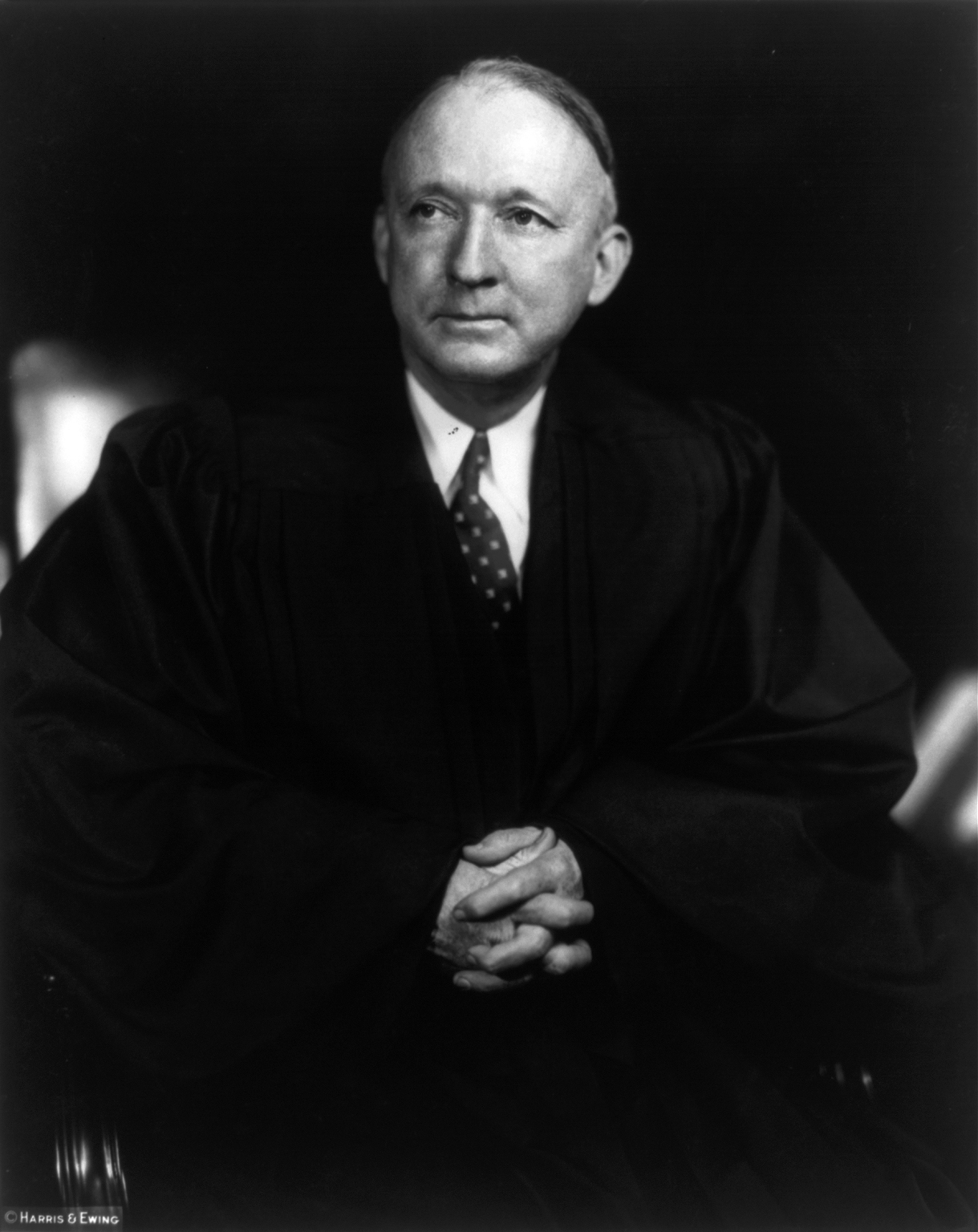
Associate Justice of the United States Hugo Black

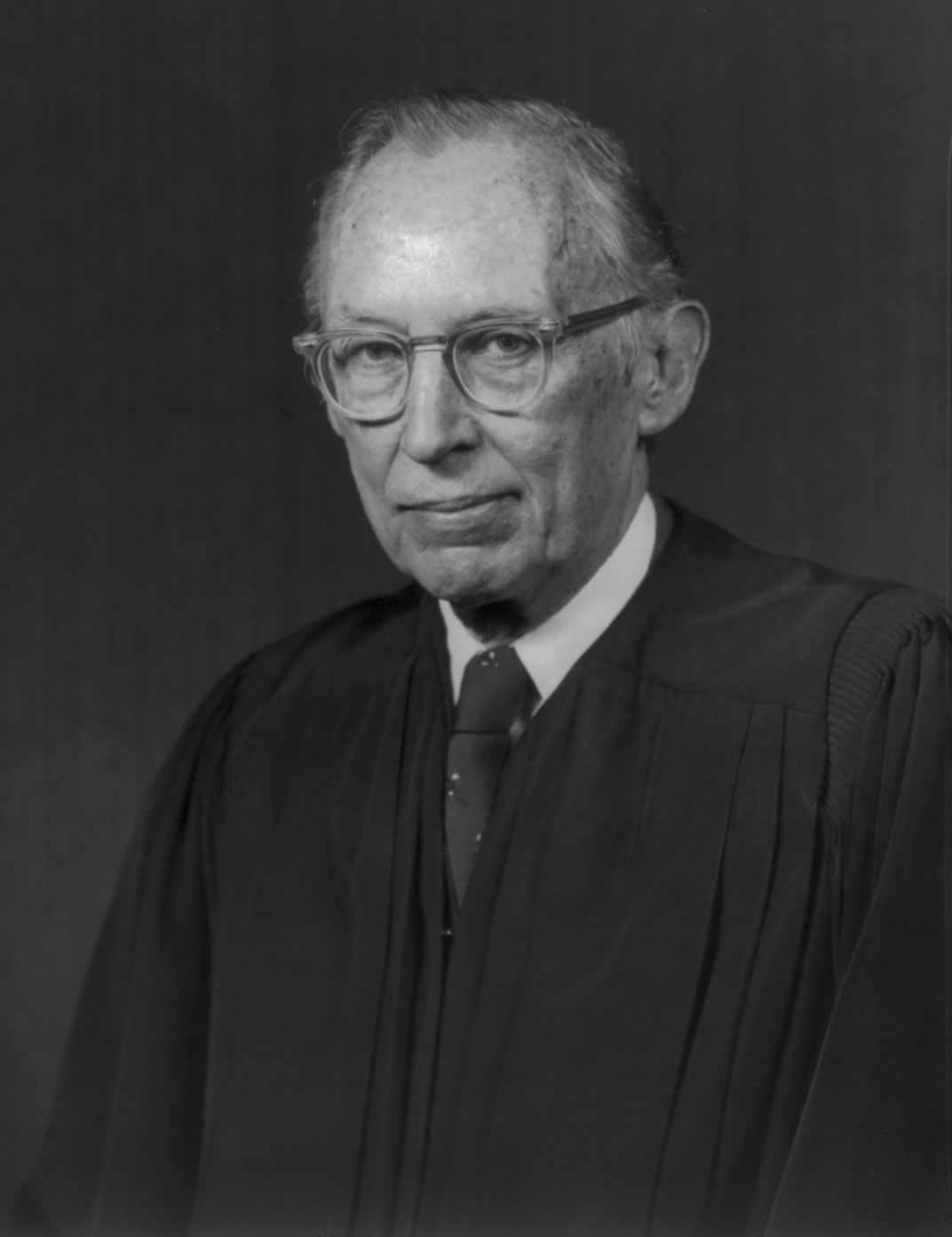
Associate Justice of the United States Lewis F. Powell, Jr.

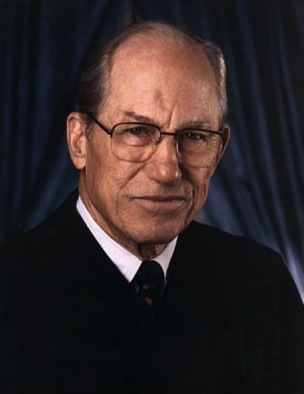
Associate Justice of the United States Byron White

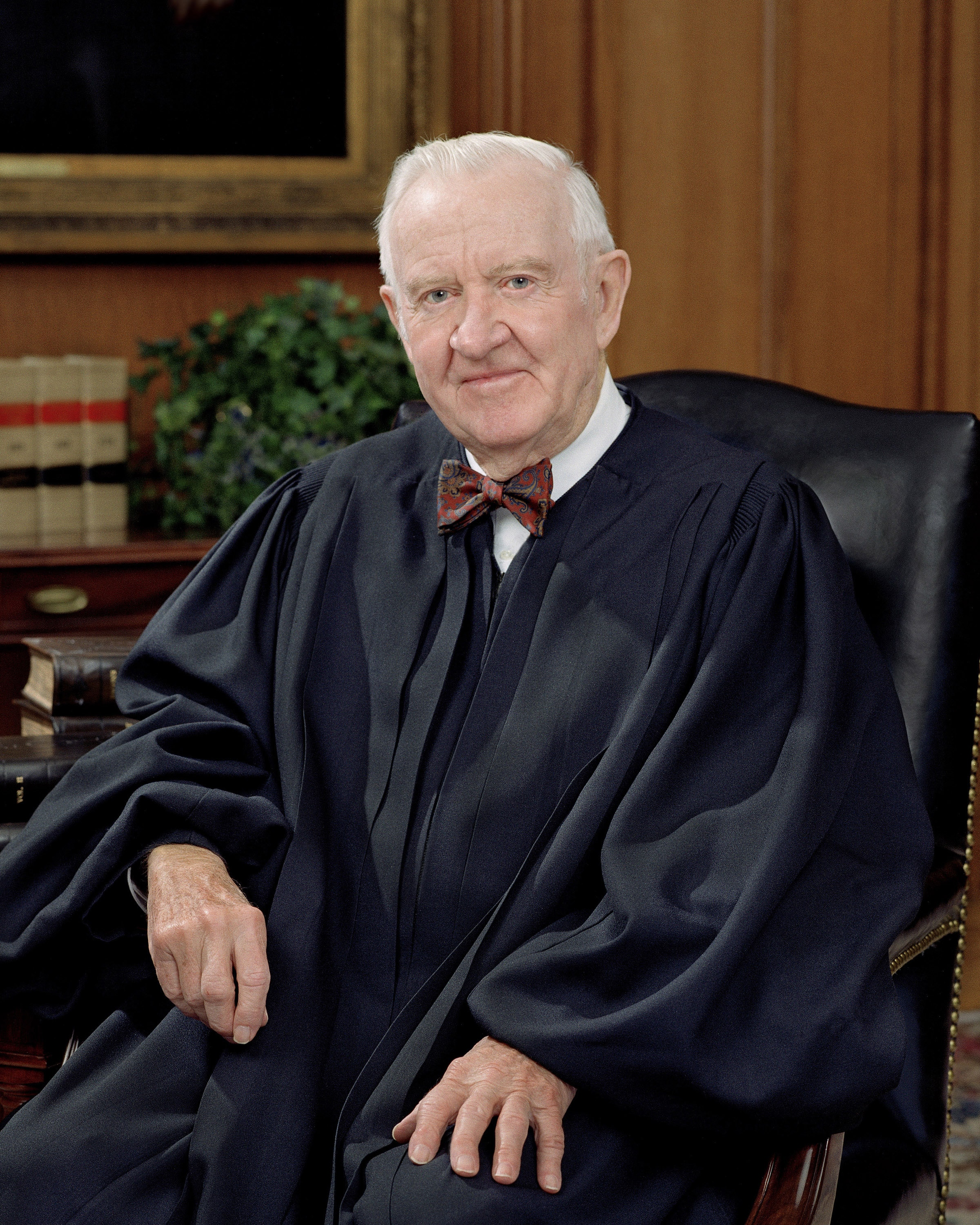
Associate Justice of the United States John Paul Stevens

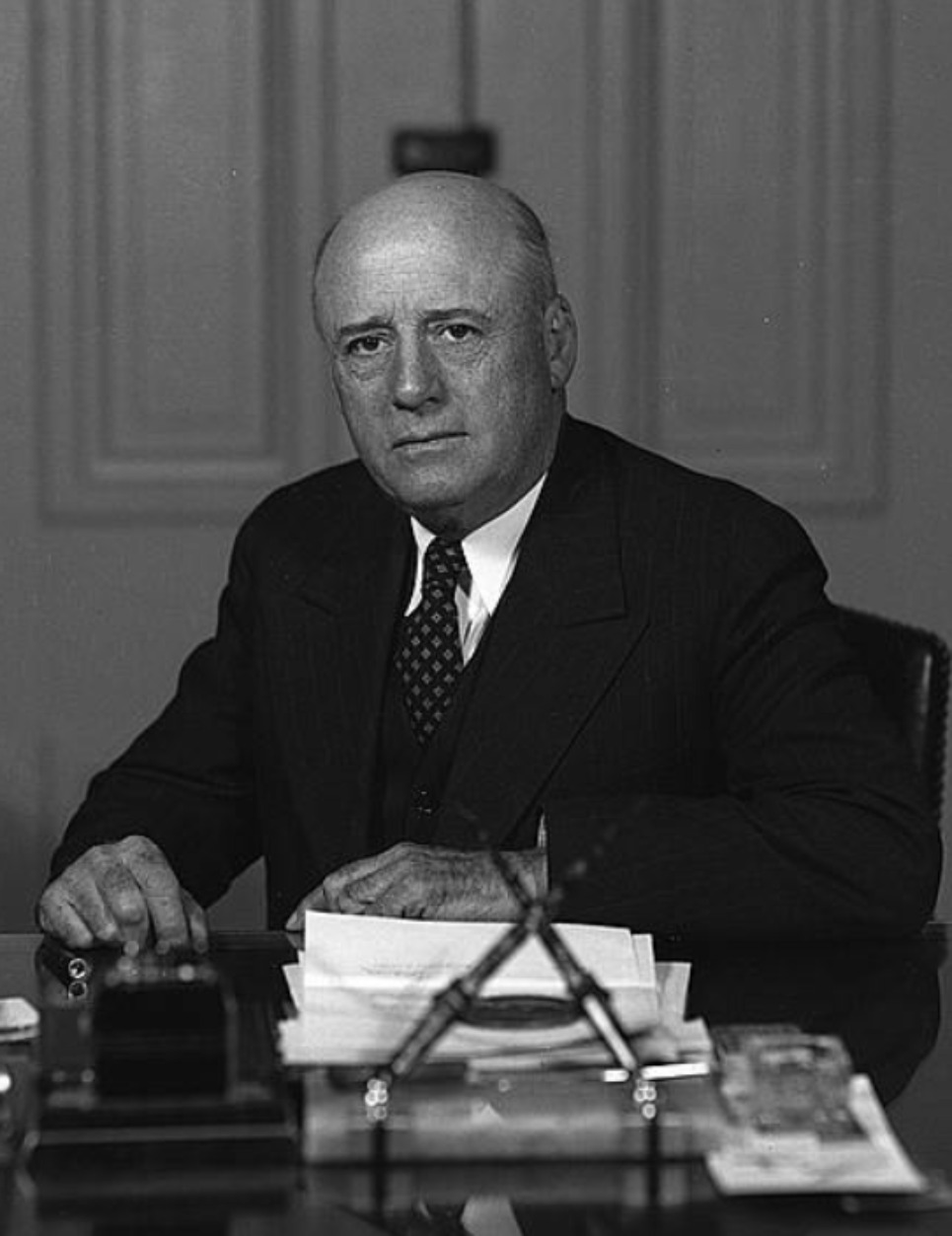
43rd Speaker of the U.S. House of Representatives Sam Rayburn

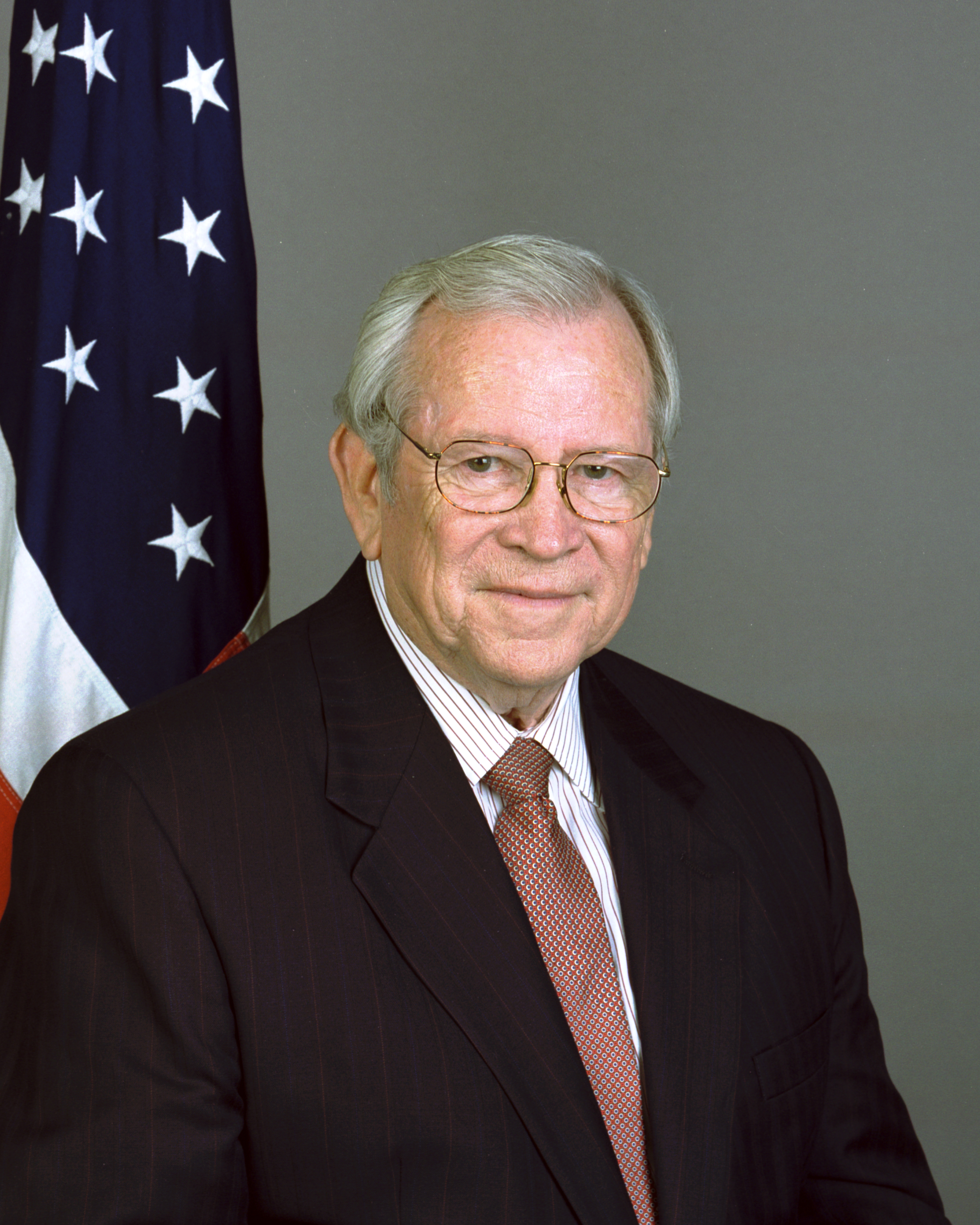
United States Senator Howard Baker

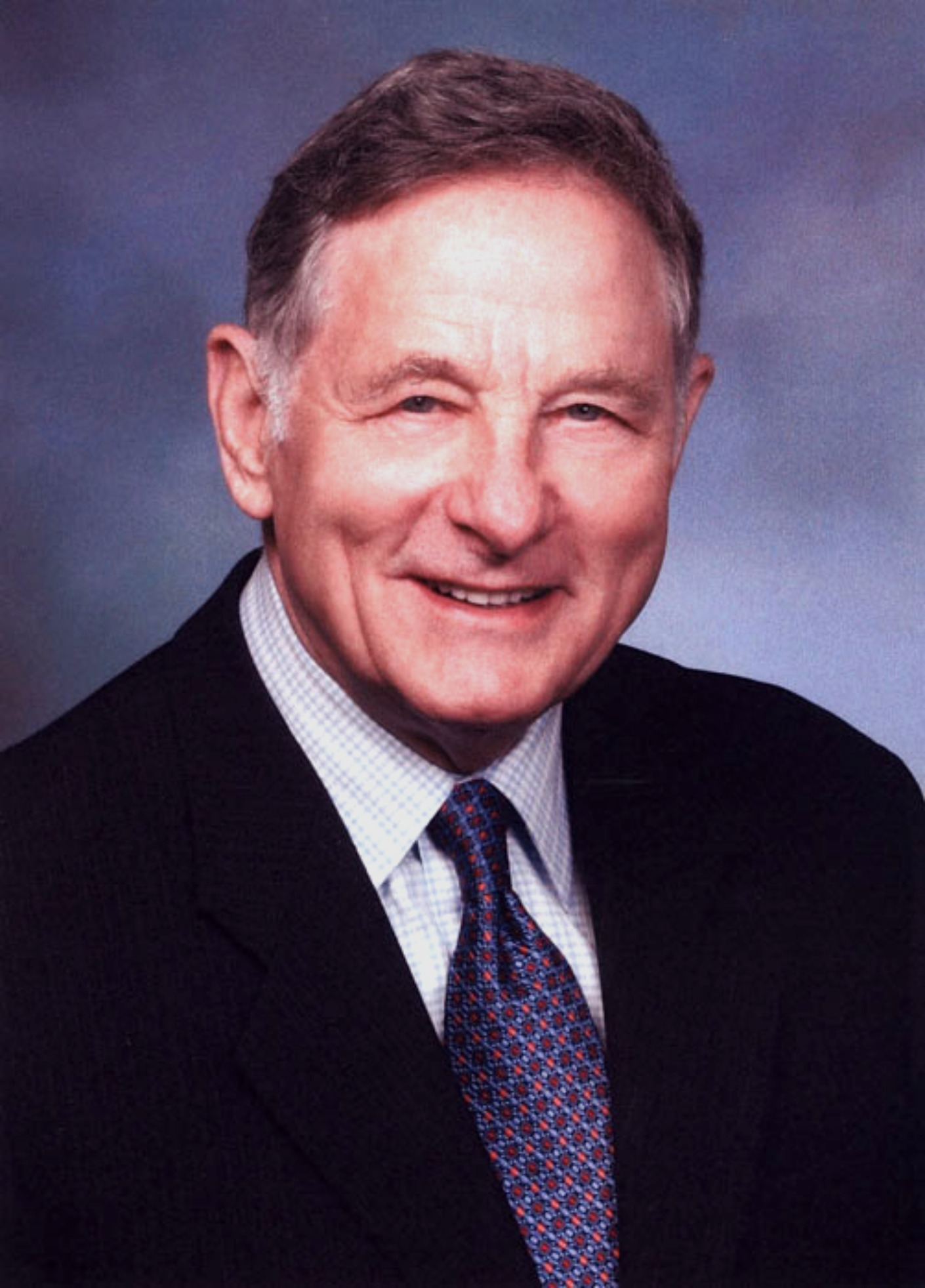
United States Senator Birch Bayh

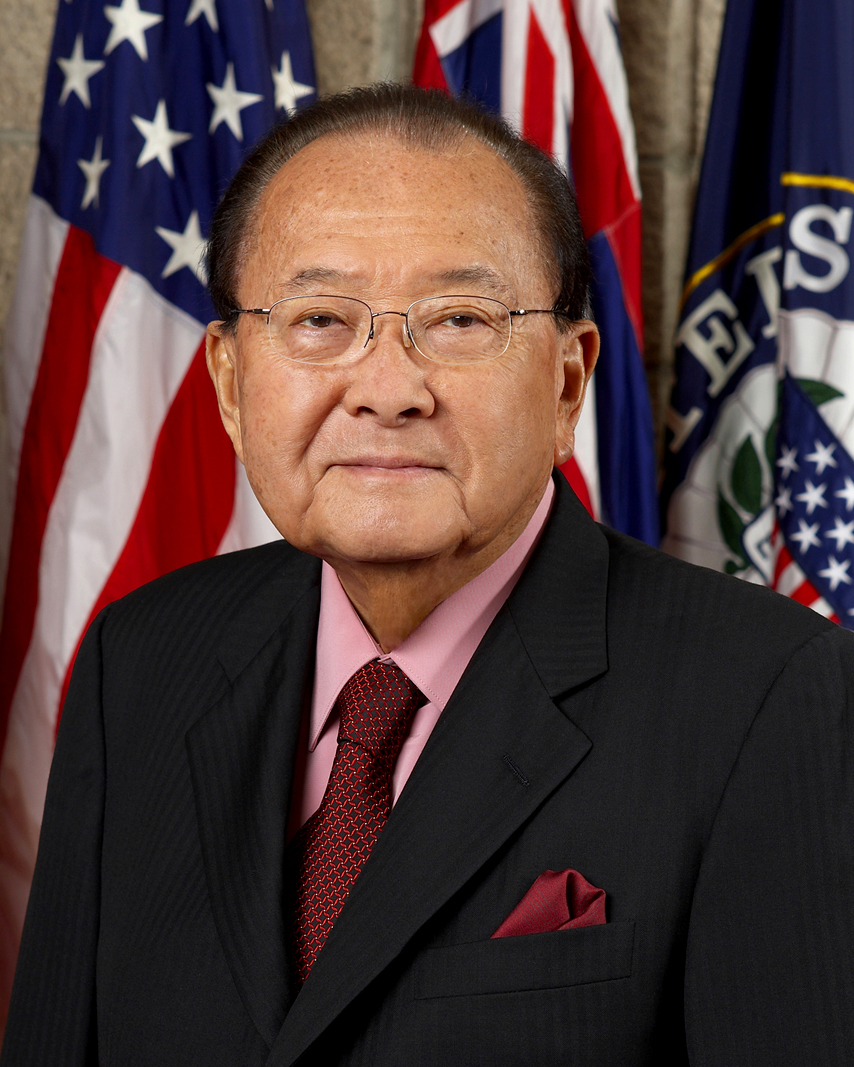
United States Senator Daniel Inouye

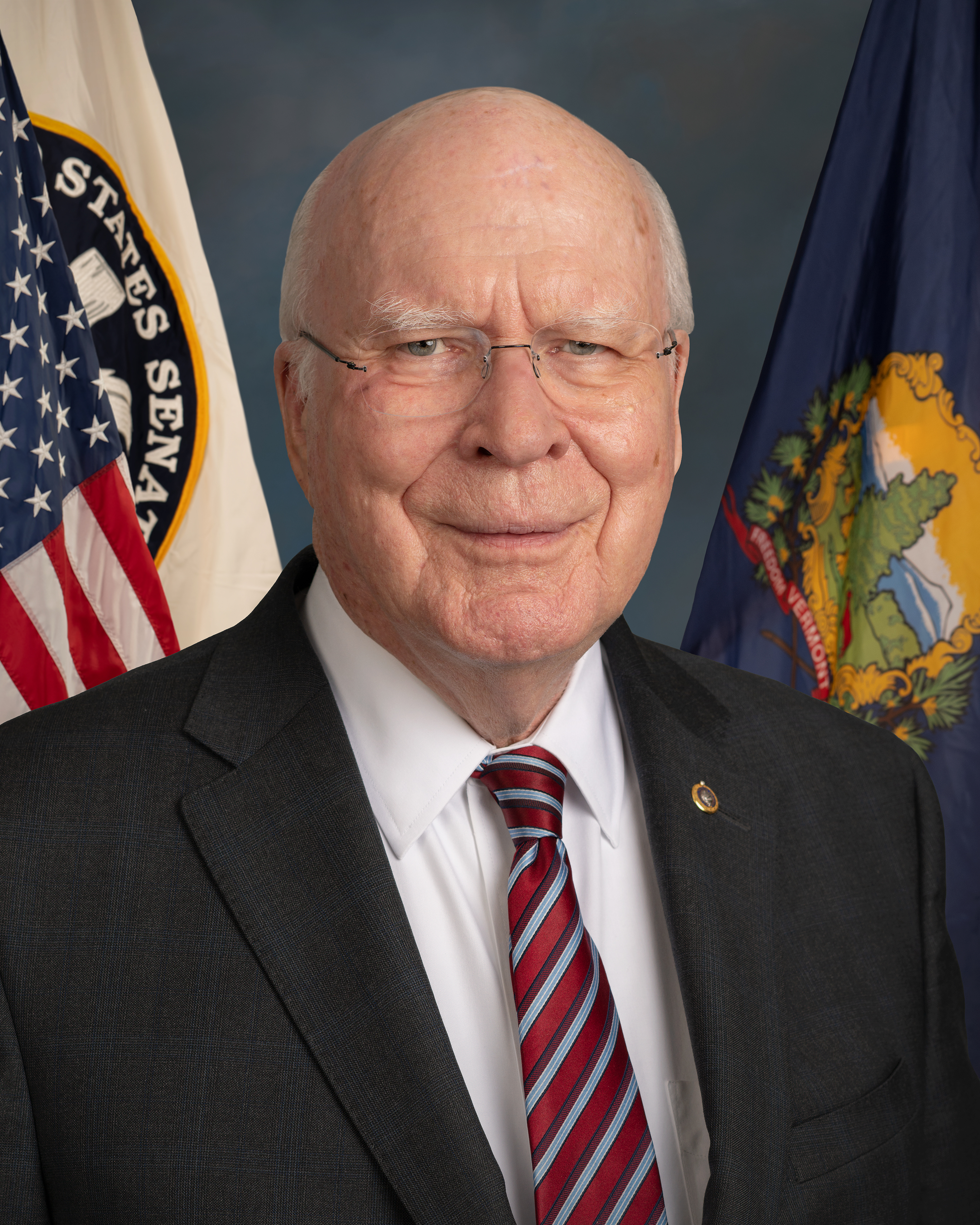
United States Senator Patrick Leahy

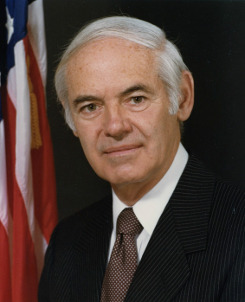
74th United States Attorney General William French Smith

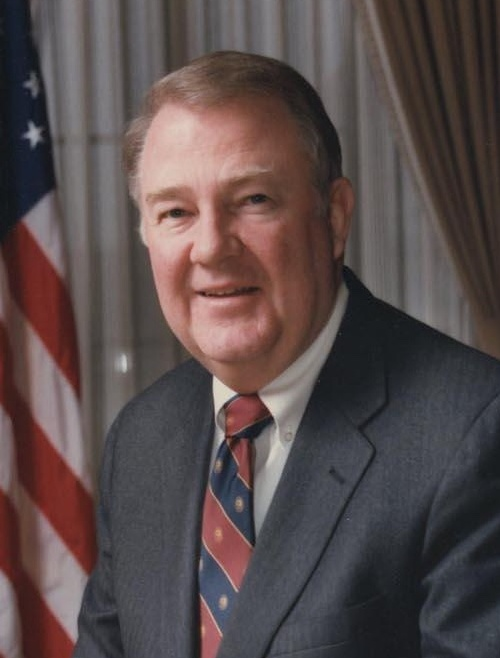
75th United States Attorney General Edwin Meese

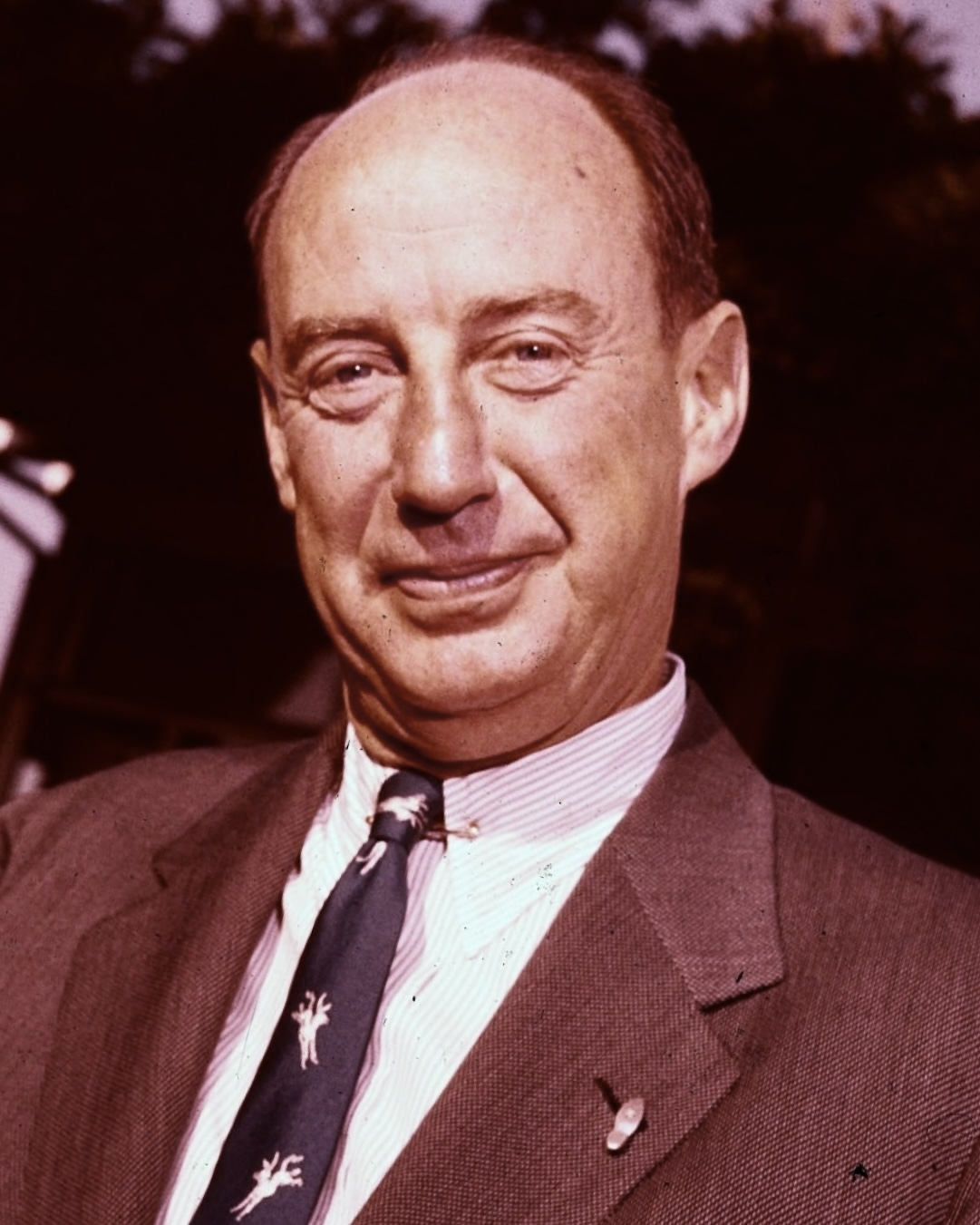
31st Governor of Illinois Adlai Stevenson II

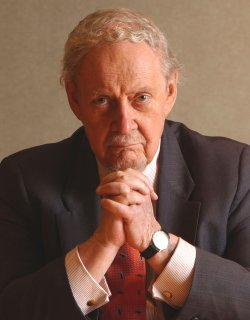
Solicitor General of the United States Robert Bork

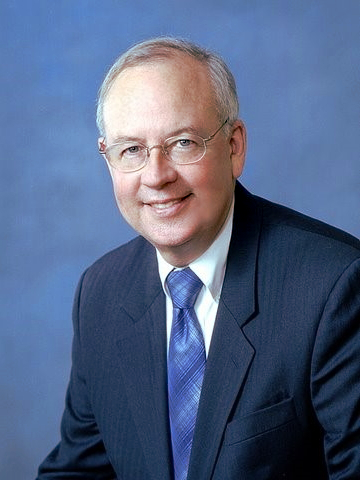
Solicitor General of the United States Ken Starr

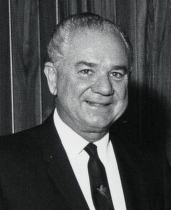
Watergate scandal special prosecutor Leon Jaworski

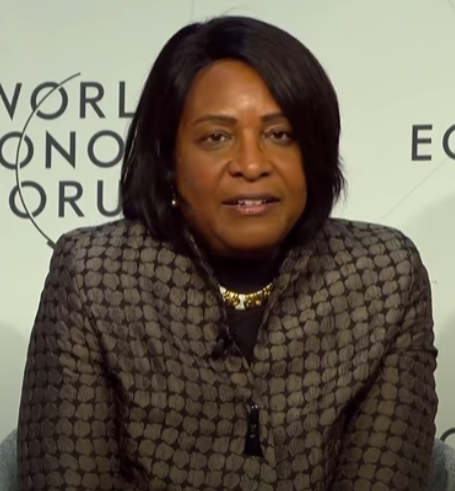
38th Indiana Attorney General Pamela Carter
