= Alpha Omicron Pi =

North American collegiate sorority

- ΑΟΠ
- Founded: January 2, 1897; 129 years ago Barnard College
- Type: Social
- Affiliation: NPC
- Status: Active
- Scope: International
- Motto: "Inspire Ambition"
- Pillars: Character, Dignity, Scholarship, College Loyalty
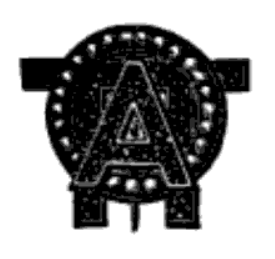
- Member badge
- Colors: Cardinal
- Symbol: Sheaf of wheat
- Flower: Jacqueminot rose
- Jewel: Ruby
- Mascot: Panda
- Publication: To Dragma
- Philanthropy: The Arthritis Foundation
- Chapters: 143
- Members: 191,000 + lifetime
- Headquarters: 5390 Virginia Way; Brentwood, Tennessee 37027; United States
- Website: alphaomicronpi.org

Alpha Omicron Pi (ΑΟΠ, AOII, Alpha O) is an international women's fraternity or collegiate sorority. It was founded in 1897 at Barnard College on the campus of Columbia University in Manhattan, New York City. It has more than 140 active collegiate chapters and 159 active alumnae chapters in Canada and the United States. The fraternity is headquartered in Brentwood, Tennessee, and is a member of the National Panhellenic Conference.

== History ==
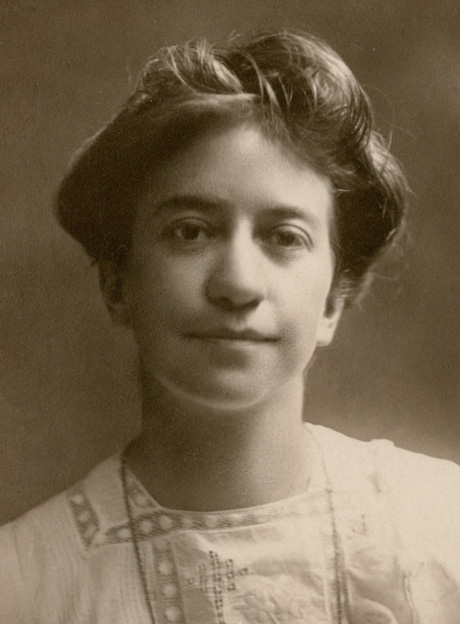
Jessie Wallace Hughan, one of four women who founded the first Alpha Omicron Pi chapter in 1897

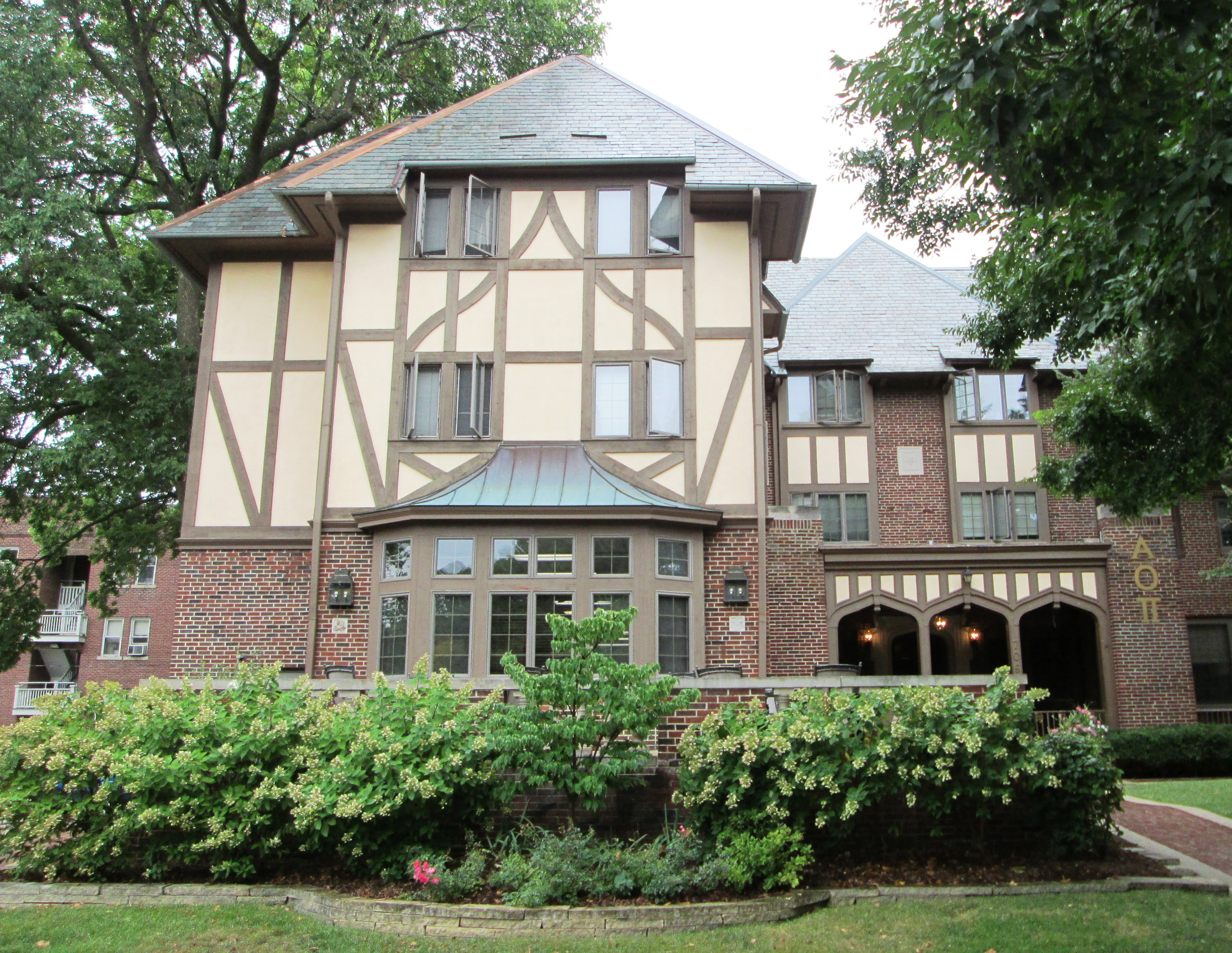
The Alpha Omicron Pi sorority house at the University of Illinois Urbana-Champaign in Champaign, Illinois

Alpha Omicron Pi was founded January 2, 1897, at Barnard College on the campus of Columbia University in Manhattan, New York City. Its founders were Jessie Wallace Hughan, Helen St. Clair Mullan, Elizabeth Heywood Wyman, and Stella George Stern Perry. They pledged to one another in the Columbia Law Library to begin their fraternity. Within one week of its founding, the four founders used their initiation ritual for the first time to initiate Anne Richardson Hall.

National expansion began in 1898 with the founding of Pi chapter at Sophie Newcomb College, now part of Tulane University, in New Orleans. Stella George Stern Perry, who was then the president of the fraternity, contacted a New Orleans classmate, Evelyn Reed, who expressed compatible ideas about fraternities. Reed's sister, Katherine Reed, became the first pledge of the Pi chapter. After being initiated by Perry, Katherine Reed found others to initiate. In 1905, Alpha Omicron Pi joined the National Panhellenic Conference.

In 1967, the fraternity partnered with the Arthritis Foundation. In 1999, the fraternity's national council voted to establish ΑΟΠ Properties, a branch which manages individual chapter housing, including safety, finances, and maintenance. The subsidiary was then officially formed in 2001, but did not begin to transfer local housing contracts to national corporation control until 2009.

== Symbols ==
Alpha Omicron Pi was founded on the ideas or principles of character, dignity, scholarship, and college loyalty.

Members of the fraternity wear three different pins depending on membership status. New members who have not been initiated wear a gold sheaf of wheat pin (the sheaf itself being the official symbol of the fraternity) bound by a ribbon bearing the letters ΑΟΠ, symbolizing individuals bound together by friendship. After initiation, members may wear the membership badge, featuring the Greek letters ΑΟΠ, stacked on a narrow gold bar, with the Ο surrounded in pearls and a ruby at the apex of the Α. When the fraternity establishes a new charter, the founding members wear gold rose charter member pins which symbolize new growth.

Alpha Omicron Pi has one official color, cardinal. Its flower is the 'Général Jacqueminot', or Jacqueminot rose. Alternatively, a deep red rose may be used. The fraternity's jewel is the ruby, while its mascot is the giant panda, which the fraternity unofficially adopted in 1976 but made official in 2017. The mascot is the panda due to their friendliness and having no natural enemies. Its publication is To Dragma. Its nicknames are AOII and Alpha O.

== Philanthropy ==
Alpha Omicron Pi participates in fundraising and volunteer efforts via its philanthropic arm, the Alpha Omicron Pi Foundation. The foundation allocates grants to the fraternity's philanthropy, arthritis research, as well scholarships, educational grants, and emergency funds for fraternity members. The funds also support conference speakers, training events, and personal development programs for members.

The fraternity is partnered with the Arthritis Foundation. The partnership began in 1967, with the fraternity members contributing volunteer hours and fundraising events to raise money for arthritis research and camps for juvenile arthritis. Stuffed panda bears are collected each year to give to children attending Arthritis Foundation camps and conferences. The fraternity's national campaign for arthritis awareness is “AOII Goes Blue,” with local chapters creating individual chapter events. "Strike Out Arthritis!" (SOA) It is the fraternity's signature fundraising event. SOA Events are held each year at Major League Baseball games, since the fraternity cites "strong relationships [with] Major League Baseball teams."

Other programs the fraternity supports are Sisters for Soldiers, where members collect items and write letters to soldiers.

The Ruby Fund consists of money raised by alumnae and collegiate members and awarded to past initiated sisters in need of financial help from sisters. Applications for assistance are reviewed and ultimately chosen by the Foundation's Ruby Fund Committee.

== Chapters ==
Alpha Omicron Pi has more than 140 active collegiate chapters and 159 active alumnae chapters in Canada and the United States.

== Notable members ==
Since 1897, the fraternity has initiated over 209,000 members in 205 collegiate chapters across the United States and Canada, with 136 active chapters.

== See also ==
- List of social sororities and women's fraternities
