= Rosa 'Général Jacqueminot' =

Rose cultivar

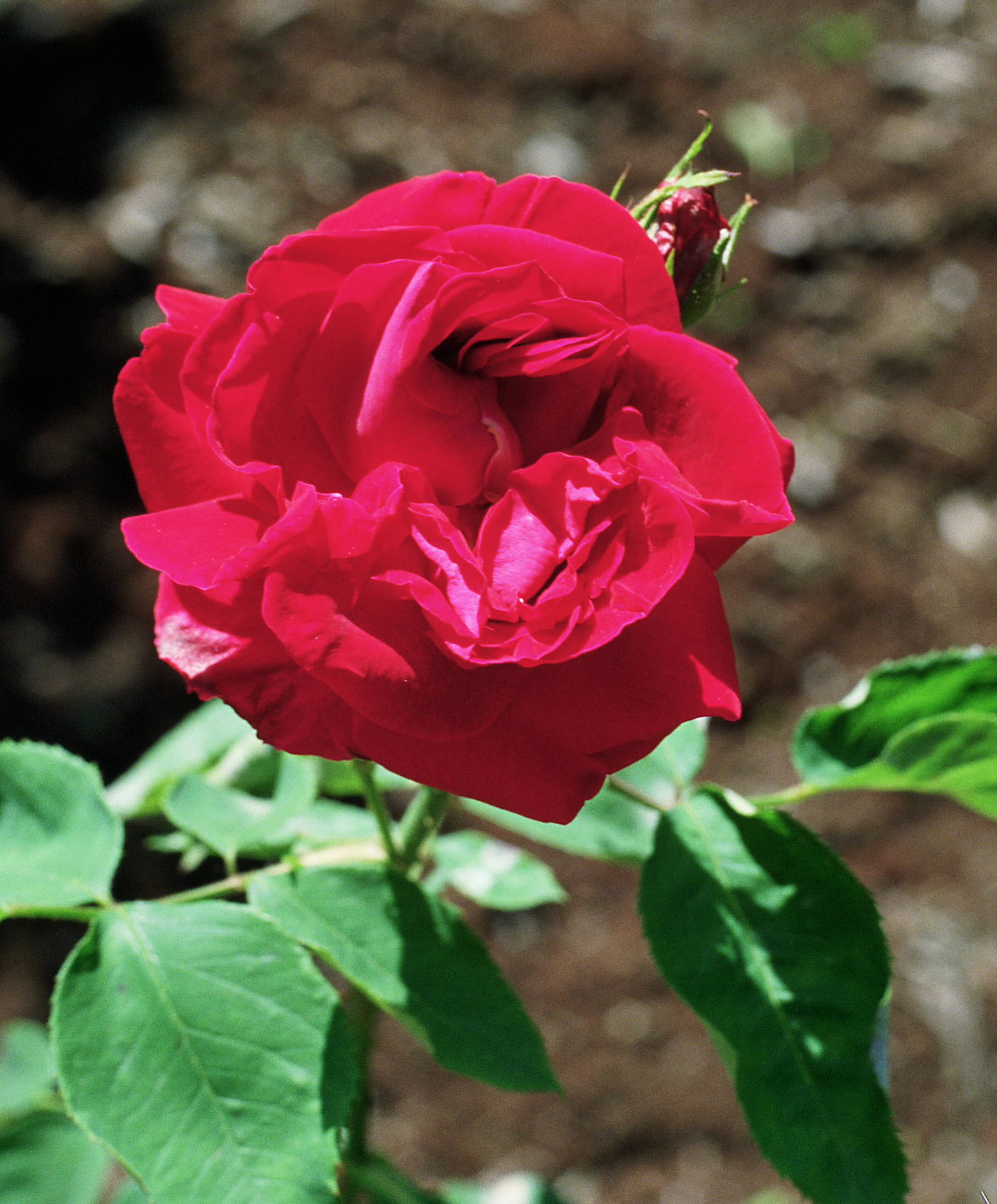
- Genus: Rosa hybrid
- Cultivar group: Hybrid Perpetual
- Cultivar: 'Général Jacqueminot'
- Marketing names: Gén. Jacqueminot, General Jack, Jack Rose
- Breeder: Roussel
- Origin: France 1853.

Rosa 'Général Jacqueminot' (pronounced: zhay-nay RHAL zhock-mee-NOH), also called 'General Jack' or 'Jack Rose', is an early Hybrid Perpetual rose cultivar, developed by Roussel, an amateur from Meudon, and introduced by the gardener Rousselet in 1853. The flower was named in honor of Jean-François Jacqueminot (1787–1865), a French general of the Napoleonic Wars. Its parentage is unclear, but 'Gloire des Rosomanes' and 'Géant des Batailles' are considered probable ancestors.

The large, double flowers are extremely fragrant. Their colour is clear red to deep pink, displaying darker purple hues as they age, The reverse is paler with occasional white streaking. The bloom form is globular and high-centered, with 24 to 30 broad petals with wavy edges, and an average diameter of 10 centimetres (3.9 in). The flowers develop from pointed, bright scarlet-crimson buds and appear in small clusters of 2 to 3 on long stems in a spring and autumn flush and scattered blooms in between.

The vigorous shrub has many slightly hooked prickles of different sizes, and grows to be 100 to 215 cm (3.28 to 7.05 ft) tall and up to 185 cm (6.07 ft) wide. The foliage consists of five oval-round leaflets with a matte surface and a bright mid- to dark green colour. 'Général Jacqueminot' is winter hardy down to −26 °C (USDA zone 5), but rather susceptible to rust and mildew later in summer.

'Général Jacqueminot' quickly gained popularity as garden and as exhibition rose—it was listed among the roses of the Botanical Garden in Cape Town only five years after its introduction in France—and was the most commonly cultivated red variety worldwide for about fifty years. The cultivar also played an important role in hybridising, leaving a host of seedlings and sports, and is an ancestor of most modern red roses. In the 1880s, some cultivars considered very similar were deemed synonyms of 'Général Jacqueminot', even though they are distinct roses. These include 'La Brillante' (Verdier, 1862), 'Mrs. Cleveland' (Gill, 1889), 'Richard Smith' (Verdier, 1861), and 'Triomphe d'Amiens' (Mille-Mallet, 1859), a sport of 'Général Jacqueminot'.

It is the flower of Theta Tau professional engineering fraternity, Phi Kappa Psi fraternity, and Alpha Omicron Pi women's fraternity.
