= Hiltrud Werner =

German business executive (born 1966)

Hiltrud Dorothea Werner
- Born: 16 April 1966 (age 58); Bad Doberan, East German
- Education: Martin Luther University, Halle-Wittenberg
- Occupation(s): Member of the Board of Management responsible for Integrity and Legal Affairs, Volkswagen AG

Hiltrud Dorothea Werner (born 1966) is a German business executive. She is the lone woman on Volkswagen AG's Board of Management, serving as the head of integrity and legal affairs. As one of three women from East Germany to serve on the board of a company from Germany's DAX stock index, she is also a public advocate for equal pay and equal opportunity for women.

== Early life and education ==
Werner was born in Bad Doberan, East Germany, on 16 April 1966. Both of her parents worked in church service: her father was a deacon in a nursing home and her mother was a secretary.

Werner graduated high school in Apolda, then completed an apprenticeship as a skilled worker in textile technology in Mühlhausen, Thuringia, in 1985. She studied "Mathematical Methods and Data Processing in Business" at the Martin Luther University of Halle-Wittenberg, where she received a degree in economics in 1989.

== Career ==
Werner began her career in 1991 as a project manager at the consulting firm Softlab GmbH in Munich, shortly after moving to West Germany. At the time, most women who had children did not work outside the home in West Germany, and out of the firm's 850 employees she was the only mother working full-time.

In 1996, Werner moved to BMW AG where she held various positions during her tenure including head of the IT department of BMW Bank, head of the BMW AG audit department for the United Kingdom and Ireland, and head of group internal audit. She relocated to the United Kingdom in 2003 to audit internally for Rolls-Royce, Mini, and BMW factory and its subsidiaries. Werner returned to Germany in 2007 and led the internal audit department of BMW's worldwide group financial services.

In 2011, she joined MAN SE as chief audit executive for the MAN Group. Werner became head of group internal audit at the automotive manufacturing company ZF Friedrichshafen in 2014.

In 2016, Werner joined Volkswagen Group as head of group audit and was appointed to Volkswagen's board of management, responsible for integrity and legal affairs in 2017. In her role at Volkswagen, Werner oversees the compliance and integrity teams for Volkswagen and its 12 brands. She was tasked with restructuring the compliance culture to ensure that the Volkswagen emissions scandal or a similar crisis would not happen again. Werner is also a member of the supervisory board of Audi AG, Porsche AG, Seat SA, and Traton SE.

Werner is part of a small minority of women and East German business executives serving on the boards of German companies. She is the first East German and second woman ever to serve on the Volkswagen Group board of management. As of 2019, she is one of three women from East Germany who serve on the board of a DAX company, out of approximately 200 board members of the 30 companies on the index. She is an advocate for equal pay and equal opportunities for women.

== Other activities ==
- Garrison Church of Potsdam, Member of the Board of Trustees (since 2020)
- Volkswagen Foundation, Member of the Board of Trustees (since 2019)
- European School of Management and Technology (ESMT), Member of the International Advisory Council
- Goethe Institute, Member of the Business and Industry Advisory Board

== Recognition ==
In 2019, Werner received the "Mentor Award of the Year for Advancement of Women in Compliance" from C5 Communications.

== Personal life ==
Werner is married and has two children.
