= Order of precedence in Germany =

Relative preeminence of officials for ceremonial purposes

The German order of precedence is a symbolic hierarchy of the highest federal offices in Germany used to direct protocol. It has no official status, but has been established in practical use. It consists of the holders or chairs of the five permanent constitutional bodies of the Federation. (Note: The non-permanent Federal Convention and the Joint Committee are headed by the President of the Bundestag ex officio.)

1. The President of Germany

- The head of state of Germany; elected by the Federal Convention for a term of five years; subsequent re-election is possible once. Deputised by the President of the Bundesrat (see below).

2. The President of the Bundestag

- The presiding officer of the Bundestag, the federal parliament of Germany. Elected by the Bundestag for the duration of a Bundestag's legislative session (4 years). Re-election is possible without term-limits as long as the incumbent remains a member of the Bundestag. Deputised by multiple Vice Presidents of the Bundestag.

3. The Chancellor of Germany

- The head of the federal government of Germany. Elected by the Bundestag for the duration of a Bundestag's legislative session (4 years), but can be recalled via a constructive vote of no confidence. Re-election is possible without term-limits. Deputised by the Vice Chancellor of Germany.

4. (1.) The President of the Bundesrat

- The presiding officer of the Bundesrat, a federal legislative chamber, in which the governments of the sixteen German states are represented. Elected by the Bundesrat for a one-year term; de jure, re-election is possible as long as the incumbent is delegated to the Bundesrat by a state government. In practice, however, the Minister-Presidents of the sixteen German states take turns holding the office in a predetermined order. Deputised by two Vice Presidents of the Bundesrat. The president of the Bundesrat is ex officio also deputy to the President of Germany (Basic Law, Article 57), thus becomes first in the order, while acting on behalf of the President or while acting as head of state during a vacancy of the presidency.

5. The President of the Federal Constitutional Court

- Presiding judge of the supreme court of Germany. Elected in alternation by the Bundestag and the Bundesrat; the term of office always lasts until the regular end of the term of the judge in question (12 years or until the judge reaches the age limit of 68, whichever occurs first). Deputised by the Vice President of the Federal Constitutional Court.

== Current office-holders ==
No.	Office	Image	Incumbent	In office since	Deputy(s)
1st	President of Germany		Frank-Walter Steinmeier	19 March 2017	Hendrik Wüst; President of the Bundesrat (See 4th)
2nd	President of the Bundestag		Julia Klöckner	25 March 2025	Andrea Lindholz; Josephine Ortleb; Omid Nouripour; Bodo Ramelow; Vice Presidents of the Bundestag
3rd	Chancellor of Germany	Friedrich Merz in 2024	Friedrich Merz	6 May 2025	Lars Klingbeil; Vice Chancellor of Germany
4th (1st)	President of the Bundesrat		Hendrik Wüst	1 November 2026	Andreas Bovenschulte; First Vice President of the Bundesrat; Markus Söder; Second Vice President of the Bundesrat
5th	President of the Federal Constitutional Court		Stephan Harbarth	22 June 2020	Ann-Katrin Kaufhold; Vice President of the Federal Constitutional Court

== Living former office-holders ==
The order of precedence is also observed with respect to former office-holders in some cases, for example if they participate in official ceremonies as honoured guests.

=== Former Presidents of Germany ===
- Christian Wulff (2010–2012)
- Joachim Gauck (2012–2017)

=== Former Presidents of the Bundestag ===
- Wolfgang Thierse (1998–2005)
- Norbert Lammert (2005–2017)
- Bärbel Bas (2021–2025)

=== Former Chancellors of Germany ===
- Gerhard Schröder (1998–2005)
- Angela Merkel (2005–2021)
- Olaf Scholz (2021–2025)

=== Former Presidents of the Bundesrat ===
- Björn Engholm (1988–1989)
- Walter Momper (1989–1990)
- Berndt Seite (1992)
- Oskar Lafontaine (1992–1993)
- Klaus Wedemeier (1993–1994)
- Edmund Stoiber (1995–1996)
- Erwin Teufel (1996–1997)
- Gerhard Schröder (1997–1998)
- Hans Eichel (1998–1999)
- Roland Koch (1999)
- Kurt Beck (2000–2001)
- Klaus Wowereit (2001–2002)
- Dieter Althaus (2003–2004)
- Matthias Platzeck (2004–2005)
- Peter Harry Carstensen (2005–2006)
- Ole von Beust (2007–2008)
- Peter Müller (2008–2009)
- Jens Böhrnsen (2009–2010)
- Hannelore Kraft (2010–2011)
- Horst Seehofer (2011–2012)
- Winfried Kretschmann (2012–2013)
- Stephan Weil (2013–2014)
- Volker Bouffier (2014–2015)
- Stanislaw Tillich (2015–2016)
- Malu Dreyer (2016–2017)
- Michael Müller (2017–2018)
- Daniel Günther (2018–2019)
- Dietmar Woidke (2019–2020)
- Reiner Haseloff (2020–2021)
- Bodo Ramelow (2021–2022)
- Peter Tschentscher (2022–2023)
- Manuela Schwesig (2023–2024)
- Anke Rehlinger (2024–2025)
- Andreas Bovenschulte (2025–2026)

=== Former Presidents of the Federal Constitutional Court ===
- Hans-Jürgen Papier (2002–2010)
- Andreas Voßkuhle (2010–2020)

== Trivia ==
As of November 2026, 116 persons have held at least one of the five highest German federal offices. Ten of them were female:

- Annemarie Renger, President of the Bundestag (1972–1976)
- Rita Süssmuth, President of the Bundestag (1988–1998)
- Jutta Limbach, President of the Federal Constitutional Court (1994–2002)
- Angela Merkel, Chancellor of Germany (2005–2021)
- Hannelore Kraft, President of the Bundesrat (2010–2011)
- Malu Dreyer, President of the Bundesrat (2016–2017)
- Bärbel Bas, President of the Bundestag (2021–2025)
- Manuela Schwesig, President of the Bundesrat (2023–2024)
- Anke Rehlinger, President of the Bundesrat (2024–2025)
- Julia Klöckner, President of the Bundestag (incumbent since 2025)

Seven persons have held two different of these offices:

- Kai-Uwe von Hassel, President of the Bundesrat (1955–1956), President of the Bundestag (1969–1972)
- Willy Brandt, President of the Bundesrat (1957–1958), Chancellor of Germany (1969–1974)
- Kurt-Georg Kiesinger, President of the Bundesrat (1962–1963), Chancellor of Germany (1966–1969)
- Karl Carstens, President of the Bundestag (1976–1979), President of Germany (1979–1984)
- Johannes Rau, President of the Bundesrat (1982–1983 and 1994–1995), President of Germany (1999–2004)
- Roman Herzog, President of the Federal Constitutional Court (1987–1994), President of Germany (1994–1999)
- Gerhard Schröder, President of the Bundesrat (1997–1998), Chancellor of Germany (1998–2005)
