= Aschaffenburg (electoral district) =

Federal electoral district of Germany

Coordinates: 50°00′16″N 9°13′50″E

246 Aschaffenburg
- Electoral district for the Bundestag
- Aschaffenburg in 2025
- State: Bavaria
- Population: 245,200 (2019)
- Electorate: 180,280 (2025)
- Major settlements: Aschaffenburg; Alzenau
- Area: 761.4 km^{2}

Current electoral district
- Created: 1949
- Party: CSU
- Member: Andrea Lindholz
- Elected: 2013, 2017, 2021, 2025

Aschaffenburg is an electoral constituency (German: Wahlkreis) represented in the Bundestag. It elects one member via first-past-the-post voting. Under the current constituency numbering system, it is designated as constituency 246. It is located in northwestern Bavaria, comprising the city of Aschaffenburg and the district of Landkreis Aschaffenburg.

Aschaffenburg was created for the inaugural 1949 federal election. Since 2013, it has been represented by Andrea Lindholz of the Christian Social Union (CSU).

== Geography ==
Aschaffenburg is located in northwestern Bavaria. As of the 2021 federal election, it comprises the independent city of Aschaffenburg and the district of Landkreis Aschaffenburg.

== History ==
Aschaffenburg was created in 1949. In the 1949 election, it was Bavaria constituency 36 in the numbering system. In the 1953 through 1961 elections, it was number 231. In the 1965 through 1998 elections, it was number 233. In the 2002 and 2005 elections, it was number 248. In the 2009 through 2021 elections, it was number 247. From the 2025 election, it has been number 246.

Originally, the constituency comprised the independent city of Aschaffenburg and the districts of Landkreis Aschaffenburg, Miltenberg, Obernburg, and Alzenau. In the 1965 through 1972 elections, it lost the district of Alzenau. It acquired its current borders in the 1976 election.

Election	No.	Name	Borders
1949	36	Aschaffenburg	Aschaffenburg city; Landkreis Aschaffenburg district; Miltenberg district; Obernburg district; Alzenau district
1953	231	Aschaffenburg	Aschaffenburg city; Landkreis Aschaffenburg district; Miltenberg district; Obernburg district; Alzenau district
1957	231	Aschaffenburg	Aschaffenburg city; Landkreis Aschaffenburg district; Miltenberg district; Obernburg district; Alzenau district
1961	231	Aschaffenburg	Aschaffenburg city; Landkreis Aschaffenburg district; Miltenberg district; Obernburg district; Alzenau district
1965	233	Aschaffenburg	Aschaffenburg city; Landkreis Aschaffenburg district; Miltenberg district; Obernburg district
1969	233	Aschaffenburg	Aschaffenburg city; Landkreis Aschaffenburg district; Miltenberg district; Obernburg district
1972	233	Aschaffenburg	Aschaffenburg city; Landkreis Aschaffenburg district; Miltenberg district; Obernburg district
1976	233	Aschaffenburg	Aschaffenburg city; Landkreis Aschaffenburg district
1980	233	Aschaffenburg	Aschaffenburg city; Landkreis Aschaffenburg district
1983	233	Aschaffenburg	Aschaffenburg city; Landkreis Aschaffenburg district
1987	233	Aschaffenburg	Aschaffenburg city; Landkreis Aschaffenburg district
1990	233	Aschaffenburg	Aschaffenburg city; Landkreis Aschaffenburg district
1994	233	Aschaffenburg	Aschaffenburg city; Landkreis Aschaffenburg district
1998	233	Aschaffenburg	Aschaffenburg city; Landkreis Aschaffenburg district
2002	248	Aschaffenburg	Aschaffenburg city; Landkreis Aschaffenburg district
2005	248	Aschaffenburg	Aschaffenburg city; Landkreis Aschaffenburg district
2009	247	Aschaffenburg	Aschaffenburg city; Landkreis Aschaffenburg district
2013	247	Aschaffenburg	Aschaffenburg city; Landkreis Aschaffenburg district
2017	247	Aschaffenburg	Aschaffenburg city; Landkreis Aschaffenburg district
2021	247	Aschaffenburg	Aschaffenburg city; Landkreis Aschaffenburg district
2025	246	Aschaffenburg	Aschaffenburg city; Landkreis Aschaffenburg district

== Members ==
The constituency has been held continuously by the Christian Social Union (CSU) since its creation. It was first represented by Hugo Karpf from 1949 to 1957, followed by Karl-Heinz Vogt from 1957 to 1969. Paul Gerlach was representative from 1969 to 1987. Norbert Geis then served from 1987 to 2013, a total of seven consecutive terms. Andrea Lindholz was elected in 2013, and re-elected in 2017, 2021, and 2025.

Election	Member	Party	%
1949	Hugo Karpf	CSU	46.8
1953	Hugo Karpf	CSU	54.8
1957	Karl-Heinz Vogt	CSU	58.9
1961	Karl-Heinz Vogt	CSU	55.0
1965	Karl-Heinz Vogt	CSU	56.4
1969	Paul Gerlach	CSU	55.9
1972	Paul Gerlach	CSU	54.7
1976	Paul Gerlach	CSU	57.9
1980	Paul Gerlach	CSU	56.7
1983	Paul Gerlach	CSU	61.9
1987	Norbert Geis	CSU	59.0
1990	Norbert Geis	CSU	55.3
1994	Norbert Geis	CSU	53.3
1998	Norbert Geis	CSU	51.4
2002	Norbert Geis	CSU	54.9
2005	Norbert Geis	CSU	52.4
2009	Norbert Geis	CSU	42.8
2013	Andrea Lindholz	CSU	52.4
2017	Andrea Lindholz	CSU	48.1
2021	Andrea Lindholz	CSU	40.7
2021	Andrea Lindholz	CSU	43.8

== Election results ==
=== 2025 election ===
Federal election (2025): Aschaffenburg
Notes:	Blue background denotes the winner of the electorate vote. Pink background denotes a candidate elected from their party list. Yellow background denotes an electorate win by a list member, or other incumbent. A ✓ or ✗ denotes status of any incumbent, win or lose respectively.						
Party	Candidate	Votes	%	±%	Party votes	%	±%
CSU	✓ Andrea Lindholz	67,592	43.8	▲3.1	58,806	38.0	▲6.7
AfD	Joachim Josef Rausch	28,439	18.4	▲8.8	29,410	19.0	▲9.6
SPD	Manuel Stefan Michniok	19,006	12.3	▼4.8	19,697	12.7	▼8.0
Greens	Niklas Wagener	18,230	11.8	▼1.6	17,251	11.2	▼3.0
Left	Florian Simon Hofmann	7,335	4.8	▲2.3	9,277	6.0	▲3.2
FDP	Karsten Franziskus Klein	5,169	3.3	▼4.7	6,833	4.4	▼6.7
BSW					4,985	3.2	
FW	Benno Friedrich	4,314	2.8	▼0.7	3,455	2.2	▼1.7
APT					1,509	1.0	▼0.3
Volt	Jan Philipp Keßler	1,650	1.1		1,177	0.8	▲0.5
PARTEI					641	0.4	▼0.4
ÖDP	Katrin Irmgard Bauer	1,078	0.7	▼0.4	492	0.3	▼0.2
dieBasis					405	0.3	▼1.2
BP	Marco Scholz	572	0.4	Steady	236	0.2	▼0.1
Integrity and Justice for a Strong Germany	Taoufik Hamid	527	0.3				
BD	Burhan Gülmüs	423	0.3		222	0.1	
Humanists					111	0.1	Steady
MLPD					70	0.0	Steady
Informal votes		984			742		
Total valid votes		154,335			154,577		
Turnout		155,319	86.2	▲5.8			
CSU hold	Majority	39,153	25.4	▲1.8			

=== 2021 election ===
Federal election (2021): Aschaffenburg
Notes:	Blue background denotes the winner of the electorate vote. Pink background denotes a candidate elected from their party list. Yellow background denotes an electorate win by a list member, or other incumbent. A ✓ or ✗ denotes status of any incumbent, win or lose respectively.						
Party	Candidate	Votes	%	±%	Party votes	%	±%
CSU	✓ Andrea Lindholz	59,269	40.7	▼7.4	45,739	31.4	▼7.0
SPD	Tobias Wüst	24,893	17.1	▲0.5	30,232	20.7	▲3.2
Greens	Niklas Wagener	19,588	13.5	▲4.3	20,642	14.2	▲4.8
AfD	Jörg Baumann	13,954	9.6	▼0.9	13,716	9.4	▼2.2
FDP	Karsten Klein	11,683	8.0	▲0.1	16,199	11.1	▲0.2
FW	Benjamin Withauer	5,087	3.5		5,718	3.9	▲2.2
Left	Florian Hofmann	3,536	2.4	▼2.4	4,068	2.8	▼3.3
dieBasis	Sylvia Pflug	2,412	1.7		2,112	1.4	
Tierschutzpartei					1,917	1.3	▲0.4
PARTEI	Andreas Portscher	2,022	1.4		1,138	0.8	▼0.1
ÖDP	Katharina Dehn	1,580	1.1	▼0.9	805	0.6	▼0.2
Team Todenhöfer					608	0.4	
Pirates					551	0.4	▲0.1
BP	Andreas Reiniger	516	0.4		413	0.3	0.0
Volt					370	0.3	
Unabhängige					361	0.2	
Gesundheitsforschung					210	0.1	0.0
LKR	Holger Stenger	490	0.3		151	0.1	
Independent	Ralf Lembach	351	0.2				
V-Partei3					151	0.1	▼0.1
Humanists					139	0.1	
du.					120	0.1	
NPD					110	0.1	▼0.3
The III. Path					80	0.1	
Bündnis C					74	0.1	
MLPD	Bendrick Arnold	157	0.1	▼0.1	61	0.0	0.0
DKP					35	0.0	0.0
Informal votes		1,234			1,052		
Total valid votes		145,538			145,720		
Turnout		146,772	80.4	▲1.3			
CSU hold	Majority	34,376	23.6	▼7.9			

=== 2017 election ===
Federal election (2017): Aschaffenburg
Notes:	Blue background denotes the winner of the electorate vote. Pink background denotes a candidate elected from their party list. Yellow background denotes an electorate win by a list member, or other incumbent. A ✓ or ✗ denotes status of any incumbent, win or lose respectively.						
Party	Candidate	Votes	%	±%	Party votes	%	±%
CSU	✓ Andrea Lindholz	68,708	48.1	▼4.4	55,009	38.4	▼9.4
SPD	Alexander Spatz	23,660	16.6	▼8.5	25,198	17.6	▼4.4
AfD	Andreas Kropp	14,985	10.5		16,642	11.6	▲7.5
Greens	Niklas Wagener	13,144	9.2	▲1.2	13,432	9.4	▲0.8
FDP	Karsten Klein	11,381	8.0	▲4.7	15,610	10.9	▲5.5
Left	Georg Liebl	6,833	4.8	▲2.0	8,699	6.1	▲2.4
FW					2,423	1.7	▼0.6
PARTEI					1,235	0.9	
ÖDP	Arno Schmitt	2,798	2.0	▲0.8	1,096	0.8	▲0.2
Independent	Tim Leder	566	0.4				
Independent	Ralf Lembach	471	0.3				
NPD					470	0.3	▼0.9
Pirates					464	0.3	▼1.6
BP					404	0.3	▼0.2
V-Partei³					324	0.2	
DM					306	0.2	
Gesundheitsforschung					238	0.2	
BGE					202	0.1	
DiB					201	0.1	
MLPD	Bendrick Arnold	344	0.2		105	0.1	0.0
DKP					25	0.0	
BüSo					20	0.0	0.0
Informal votes		2,048			1,508		
Total valid votes		142,890			143,430		
Turnout		144,938	79.0	▲7.7			
CSU hold	Majority	45,048	31.5	▲4.2			

=== 2013 election ===
Federal election (2013): Aschaffenburg
Notes:	Blue background denotes the winner of the electorate vote. Pink background denotes a candidate elected from their party list. Yellow background denotes an electorate win by a list member, or other incumbent. A ✓ or ✗ denotes status of any incumbent, win or lose respectively.						
Party	Candidate	Votes	%	±%	Party votes	%	±%
CSU	Andrea Lindholz	67,591	52.4	▲9.7	61,741	47.7	▲7.6
SPD	Andreas Parr	32,308	25.1	▲6.0	28,408	22.0	▲4.5
Greens	Stefan Wagener	10,284	8.0	▼9.2	11,135	8.6	▼2.7
FDP	Helmut Kaltenhauser	4,199	3.3	▼8.2	7,003	5.4	▼10.3
AfD					5,263	4.1	
Left	Ibrahim Veziroglu	3,641	2.8	▼3.3	4,691	3.6	▼3.0
FW	Helmut Rehm	3,373	2.6		2,902	2.2	
Pirates	Lars Zillger	3,314	2.6		2,545	2.0	▼0.2
NPD	Volker Cigelski	2,173	1.7	▼0.4	1,550	1.2	▼0.1
Tierschutzpartei					1,098	0.8	▲0.2
ÖDP	Rudolf Lang	1,551	1.2	▼0.2	791	0.6	▼0.1
REP					739	0.6	▼0.8
BP					563	0.4	▲0.2
Independent		466	0.4				
DIE FRAUEN					263	0.2	
DIE VIOLETTEN					190	0.1	0.0
Party of Reason					166	0.1	
PRO					156	0.1	
MLPD					75	0.1	0.0
RRP					52	0.0	▼0.8
BüSo					15	0.0	0.0
Informal votes		2,410			1,964		
Total valid votes		128,900			129,346		
Turnout		131,310	71.3	▼2.1			
CSU hold	Majority	35,283	27.3	▲3.6			

=== 2009 election ===
Federal election (2009): Aschaffenburg
Notes:	Blue background denotes the winner of the electorate vote. Pink background denotes a candidate elected from their party list. Yellow background denotes an electorate win by a list member, or other incumbent. A ✓ or ✗ denotes status of any incumbent, win or lose respectively.						
Party	Candidate	Votes	%	±%	Party votes	%	±%
CSU	✓ Norbert Geis	56,491	42.7	▼9.7	53,201	40.1	▼6.9
SPD	Andreas Parr	25,143	19.0	▼7.4	23,235	17.5	▼9.2
Greens	Christine Scheel	22,717	17.2	▲5.8	15,071	11.4	▲3.6
FDP	Helmut Kaltenhauser	15,185	11.5	▲6.6	20,868	15.7	▲5.2
Left	Reinhold Rückert	8,072	6.1	▲3.1	8,828	6.7	▲3.2
Pirates					2,828	2.1	
NPD	Udo Sieghart	2,716	2.1	▲0.2	1,750	1.3	▲0.2
REP					1,791	1.3	▼0.2
RRP					1,180	0.9	
FAMILIE					1,089	0.8	▲0.1
ÖDP	Rudolf Lang	1,841	1.4		979	0.7	
Tierschutzpartei					917	0.7	
BP					329	0.2	0.0
DIE VIOLETTEN					246	0.2	
CM					120	0.1	
PBC					99	0.1	▼0.1
MLPD					67	0.1	▼0.1
DVU					60	0.0	
BüSo					50	0.0	0.0
Informal votes		2,840			2,297		
Total valid votes		132,165			132,708		
Turnout		135,005	73.4	▼5.8			
CSU hold	Majority	31,348	23.7	▼2.3			

=== 2005 election ===
Federal election (2005):Aschaffenburg
Notes:	Blue background denotes the winner of the electorate vote. Pink background denotes a candidate elected from their party list. Yellow background denotes an electorate win by a list member, or other incumbent. A ✓ or ✗ denotes status of any incumbent, win or lose respectively.						
Party	Candidate	Votes	%	±%	Party votes	%	±%
CSU	✓ Norbert Geis	73,957	52.4	▼2.5	66,568	47.0	▼6.5
SPD	Karin Pranghofer	37,309	26.4	▼1.1	37,783	26.4	▼2.9
Greens	Christine Scheel	16,105	11.4	▲0.3	11,050	7.8	▲0.3
FDP	Klaus Mussauer	6,897	4.9	▲0.2	14,883	10.5	▲4.8
Left	Urusula Günther	4,227	3.0	▲2.0	4,952	3.5	▲2.7
NPD	Dana Paulus	2,601	1.8		1,607	1.1	▲0.9
REP					2,174	1.5	▲0.3
Familie					1,052	0.7	
GRAUEN					435	0.3	▲0.2
Feminist					413	0.3	▲0.2
BP					337	0.2	▲0.1
PBC					198	0.1	▲0.1
MLPD					152	0.1	
BüSo					92	0.1	0.0
Informal votes		3,187			2,587		
Total valid votes		141,096			141,696		
Turnout		144,283	79.2	▼2.5			
CSU hold	Majority	36,648	26				
