= Parliamentary Oversight Panel (Germany) =

German parliamentary intelligence oversight committee

The Parliamentary Oversight Panel (PKGr) is a committee of the German Bundestag responsible for oversight of the intelligence agencies of Germany. The PKGr monitors the Federal Intelligence Service (BND; German: Bundesnachrichtendienst), the Military Counterintelligence Service (MAD; German: Militärischer Abschirmdienst), and the Federal Office for the Protection of the Constitution (BfV; German: Bundesverfassungsschutz). Under the Control Body Act (PKGrG; German: Kontrollgremiumgesetz), the federal government is obliged to inform the PKGr comprehensively about the general activities of the federal intelligence services and about events of particular importance.

== Tasks and Duties ==
At the beginning of each legislative period, the German Bundestag elects the members of the Parliamentary Oversight Panel from among its members (Section 2 (1) PKGrG). It determines the number of members, the composition, and the working methods of the Parliamentary Oversight Panel (Section 2 (2) PKGrG). The Parliamentary Oversight Panel meets at least once every quarter. It elects a chairperson and their deputy. It adopts its own rules of procedure (Section 3 (1) PKGrG). Each member may request that the Parliamentary Oversight Panel be convened and informed (Section 3 (2) PKGrG).

To the extent that the right of control of the PKGr extends, it may demand that the Federal Government and the intelligence agencies hand over files or other documents in official custody, if necessary also in the original, and transmit data stored in files. It must be granted access to all offices of the federal intelligence services at any time (Section 5 (1) PKGrG). It may question members of the intelligence services, employees and members of the Federal Government and employees of other federal authorities after informing the federal government, or obtain written information from them. The persons to be heard are obliged to provide complete and truthful information (Section 5 (2) PKGrG).

Insofar as this is necessary for compelling reasons of access to intelligence or for reasons of protecting the personal rights of third parties, or if the core area of executive responsibility is affected, the Federal Government may both refuse to inform the PKGr about general activities and events of particular importance and to hand over files and transmit files, and also prohibit employees of the Federal Intelligence Services from providing information. The Federal Government must give reasons for both to the PKGr (Section 6 (2) PKGrG).

The members of the PKGr are regularly given an insight into the work of the federal intelligence services by the federal government. Since their work is naturally to remain secret, the members of the PKGr are bound to secrecy, even towards the other members of the Bundestag (Section 10 (1) PKGrG). Because the parliamentary right to ask questions also extends to the intelligence services, the federal government and the PKGr are obliged to provide information on urgent matters. According to the Federal Constitutional Court (German: Bundesverfassungsgericht)'s ruling 2 BvE 5/06, the federal government's argument that intelligence matters are to be discussed exclusively in the PKGr and not made public is inadmissible because the parliamentary right to ask questions also extends to the federal intelligence services. Three copies of the minutes of the PKGr's meetings are produced.

Employees of the federal intelligence services are permitted to address the Parliamentary Oversight Panel directly in official matters as well as in cases of internal grievances, without following official channels. They may not be reprimanded or discriminated against in the service because of the fact of their submission. Submissions from citizens to the German Bundestag concerning conduct by the federal intelligence services that affects them may be brought to the attention of the Parliamentary Oversight Panel (Section 8 PKGrG).

Within the scope of their departmental responsibilities, the Interior and Defense Committees also exercise a certain degree of control over the BfV and the MAD, respectively.

== History ==
=== Parliamentary Privy Council (PVMG) ===
The predecessor of the Parliamentary Control Board was the Parliamentary Confidence Committee (PVMG). It was installed in 1956 by then Chancellor Konrad Adenauer and met only three times between 1956 and 1960. After the last meeting in 1958, the body met on September 4, 1963, on the occasion of the July 23 conviction of BND employee and KGB spy Heinz Felfe. Reinhard Gehlen, then president of the BND, and his closest associates reported on the case, personnel, and security standards.

In mid-1976, the PVMG held its last meeting. When it was founded, the PVMG was solely responsible for controlling the BND. In 1965, its responsibility expanded to include the BfV and the MAD.

=== Parliamentary Control Commission (PKK) ===
In 1978, after a two-year hiatus, the PVMG was replaced by the Parliamentary Control Commission (PKK). Unlike the PVMG, the PKK was given a legal basis, the Law on Parliamentary Control of Federal Intelligence Activities (German: Gesetz über die parlamentarische Kontrolle nachrichtendienstlicher Tätigkeit des Bundes).

=== Parliamentary Oversight Panel (PKGr) ===
In 1999, the Parliamentary Control Commission was renamed the Parliamentary Oversight Panel, partly because of the abbreviation PKK, which the general public tends to associate with the Kurdistan Workers' Party. Since 2009, the PKGr has also been constitutionally enshrined in Article 45d of the Basic Law - the only article of the Basic Law with an official title. The law was also amended on July 29, 2009.

The PKGr sparked particular debate when parties deemed unreliable or extremist by other parties claimed a place on it. This was the case with the Greens in the 1980s and 1990s, with the PDS since 1990, and with the AfD in 2018.

Wolfgang Nešković, a non-party member of the PKGr since 2005 for the party Die Linke, was initially not confirmed by the Bundestag in December 2009, a hitherto unique occurrence. In a second vote on January 20, 2010, Nešković was then re-elected to the PKGr in a roll call vote with 320 votes in favor, 226 against, and 35 abstentions. After resigning from his parliamentary group, he left the PKGr in December 2012, and was succeeded by Steffen Bockhahn.

The Berlin Senior Attorney General Roman Reusch, nominated by the AfD, initially fell short of the necessary 355 votes in the first round of voting on January 18, 2018, after politicians from the other parties expressed reservations about Reusch. In the second round of voting, Reusch was finally elected to the PKGr.

In 2013, in the wake of the NSA surveillance scandal, in which revelations by whistleblower Edward Snowden, among others, revealed that German intelligence services had also been involved in prohibited surveillance measures, Chancellor Angela Merkel initiated a reform of the Control Body Act, whereupon on 1. July 2014, several measures to increase oversight of the intelligence services were reported: Among other things, a Permanent Plenipotentiary (Intelligence Commissioner of the Bundestag) was established to support the PKGr. The PKGr was also given the task of overseeing the intelligence services.

== Members of the PKGr ==
The PKGr can include transitional members who are no longer members of the Bundestag: In order to ensure uninterrupted oversight of the federal intelligence services, the Parliamentary Oversight Panel continues to carry out its activities beyond the end of an electoral period of the German Bundestag until the subsequent German Bundestag has decided on a new composition (Section 3 (4) PKGrG). Such a situation existed, for example, on October 24, 2013, when, in connection with the 2013 surveillance and espionage affair and indications of eavesdropping by the United States of America on Chancellor Angela Merkel, the FDP members of the 17th German Bundestag who had not been reelected to the 18th German Bundestag took part in a special meeting of the Oversight Panel during the legislative term of the 18th German Bundestag.

=== 20th Bundestag ===
Established on 24 March 2022 by the 20th Bundestag with 11 members out of 13 candidates. The SPD parliamentary group sent four members (Uli Grötsch, Sebastian Hartmann, Ralf Stegner and Marja-Liisa Völlers), the CDU/CSU parliamentary group sent three members (Alexander Hoffmann, Roderich Kiesewetter and Christoph de Vries) while both parliamentary groups of the coalition partners the Alliance 90/The Greens and FDP sent two members, Irene Mihalic and Konstantin von Notz from the Greens and Konstantin Kuhle and Alexander Graf Lambsdorff from FDP. Two additional candidates, Joachim Wundrak from Alternative for Germany and André Hahn from The Left failed to get the required 369 votes. As chair was chosen the preceding panel's deputy Konstantin von Notz while the preceding panel's chair Roderich Kiesewetter was chosen as deputy chair.

=== 19th Bundestag ===
The Parliamentary Oversight Panel of the 19th Bundestag was established on January 18, 2018 and consisted of nine members. The CDU/CSU parliamentary group sent three members, the SPD parliamentary group two, and the AfD parliamentary group, the FDP parliamentary group, the Alliance 90/The Greens parliamentary group and the Left Party parliamentary group one member each. The CDU/CSU parliamentary group held the chair. After the resignation of Armin Schuster from the Bundestag, the CDU MP Roderich Kiesewetter was elected with a broad majority of 541 votes out of 355 votes required on November 25, 2020. The other 8 members of the PKGr were: Konstantin von Notz (Alliance 90/The Greens) as deputy chairman, and Andrea Lindholz (CSU), Patrick Sensburg (CDU), Uli Grötsch (SPD), Thomas Hitschler (SPD), Roman Reusch (AfD), Stephan Thomae (FDP), and André Hahn (Linke).

=== 18th Bundestag ===
The nine members of the panel in the 18th legislative period of the German Bundestag were: Clemens Binninger (CDU) as chairman, André Hahn (Linke) as deputy chairman, and Manfred Grund (CDU), Stephan Mayer (CSU), Armin Schuster (CDU), Gabriele Fograscher (SPD), Uli Grötsch (SPD), Burkhard Lischka (SPD), and Hans-Christian Ströbele (Greens).

=== 17th Bundestag ===
Members of the 11-member body during the 17th legislative period of the German Bundestag were: Thomas Oppermann (SPD) as chairman, Michael Grosse-Brömer (CDU) as deputy chairman, and Clemens Binninger (CDU), Manfred Grund (CDU), Hans-Peter Uhl (CSU), Michael Hartmann (SPD), Fritz Rudolf Körper (SPD), Gisela Piltz (FDP), Hartfrid Wolff (FDP), Steffen Bockhahn (Linke), and Hans-Christian Ströbele (Greens).

=== 16th Bundestag ===
In the 16th legislative period of the German Bundestag, the committee had nine members. These were: Max Stadler (FDP) as chairman, Norbert Röttgen (CDU) as deputy chairman, and Bernd Schmidbauer (CDU), Hans-Peter Uhl (CSU), Fritz Rudolf Körper (SPD), Thomas Oppermann (SPD), Joachim Stünker (SPD), Wolfgang Nešković (Linke), and Hans-Christian Ströbele (Grüne).

== Criticism ==
The PKGr is sometimes described as "toothless," i.e., without any real power. In the past, for example, intelligence services could sometimes only be visited with advance notice, and members of the PKGr reported that intelligence service employees had told them the untruth on several occasions.

Although the Control Body Act does not provide for sanctions in the event of non-compliance with information obligations by the responsible intelligence service employees and preventive control of intelligence-related ones. However, restriction measures under the Article 10 Act must in principle be approved in advance by the G 10 Commission. Although the PKGr cannot itself bring unlawful actions to criminal charges or order the publication of corresponding, confidential documents, it can call on the German government to put a stop to abuses.

In addition, there are calls for the PKGr to be given the rights of a committee of inquiry in order to be able to effectively investigate breaches of the law (currently, for example, no evidence can be collected or witnesses summoned). However, the German Bundestag has the right to set up committees of inquiry to investigate possible misconduct in the area of the federal intelligence services, which can take evidence and summon witnesses (Section 44 of the Basic Law). The Bundestag has already made numerous uses of this right, such as in the Murat Kurnaz case or in the so-called Plutonium affair. The Defense Committee can declare itself a committee of inquiry to investigate events in the MAD (Section 45a (2) of the Basic Law).

Organizations such as netzpolitik.org also criticize the fact that the PKGr is almost completely deprived of data on cooperation with foreign intelligence services, for example. Furthermore, it is critically noted that the PKGr controls the intelligence services of the federal government, but not other security agencies, which also sometimes use quasi-intelligence resources, such as the Federal Police, the Federal Criminal Police Office or the German Customs Investigation Bureau. In particular, increasingly far-reaching powers, in terms of online searches and source telecommunication surveillance by law enforcement agencies, raise the question of who actually monitors these measures, especially since the technology used is presumably the same. At any rate, the responsible Interior Committee of the German Bundestag does not currently receive any such information due to the secrecy interests of the federal government.

Time and again, information from secret meetings of the PKGr is leaked to the mass media and thus reaches the public, including from the report on the BND journalist scandal. This could lead to the federal government making more frequent use of its right to refuse to provide information (Section 6 (2) PKGrG). Thus, the behavior of individual PKGr members would run counter to the control purpose of the parliamentary body. The PKGr asked the Bundestag President Norbert Lammert in the so-called journalist scandal at the time, to initiate legal action, because of the suspected violation of official secrets (§ 353b StGB) by the illegal disclosure of information.

== See also ==
- Intelligence and Security Committee of Parliament: Similar committee in the UK Parliament

== Literature ==
- Act on Parliamentary Control of Federal Intelligence Activities (German: Gesetz über die parlamentarische Kontrolle nachrichtendienstlicher Tätigkeit des Bundes)
- Friedel, Andreas: Blackbox Parlamentarisches Kontrollgremium des Bundestages – Defizite und Optimierungsstrategien bei der Kontrolle der Nachrichtendienste. Springer VS, Wiesbaden 2019, ISBN 978-3-658-25791-0.
- Hansalek, Erik: Die parlamentarische Kontrolle der Bundesregierung im Bereich der Nachrichtendienste (Kölner Schriften zu Recht und Staat Band 27). Lang, Frankfurt am Main 2006, ISBN 978-3-631-54454-9.
- Hempel, Marcel: Der Bundestag und die Nachrichtendienste – eine Neubestimmung durch Art. 45d GG? (Schriften zum Öffentlichen Recht, Band 1268). Duncker & Humblot, Berlin 2014, ISBN 978-3-428-14353-5.
- Hirsch, Alexander: Die parlamentarische Kontrolle der Nachrichtendienste (Schriften zum Öffentlichen Recht, Band 711). Duncker & Humblot, Berlin 1996, ISBN 3-428-08823-9.
- Hörauf, Dominic: Die demokratische Kontrolle des Bundesnachrichtendienstes – Ein Rechtsvergleich vor und nach 9/11 (Verfassungsrecht in Forschung in Praxis Band 88). Kovač, Hamburg 2011, ISBN 978-3-8300-5729-1.
- Neumann, Volker: Die parlamentarische Kontrolle der Nachrichtendienste in Deutschland, in: Nikolas Dörr und Till Zimmermann: Die Nachrichtendienste der Bundesrepublik Deutschland. wvb, Berlin 2007. ISBN 978-3-86573-307-8, pp. 13−34.
- Jens Singer: Praxiskommentar zum Gesetz über die parlamentarische Kontrolle nachrichtendienstlicher Tätigkeit des Bundes: Kontrollgremiumgesetz – PKGrG. Springer, Berlin u. Heidelberg 2016, ISBN 978-3-662-46862-3.
- Waske, Stefanie: Mehr Liaison als Kontrolle – die Kontrolle des BND durch Parlament und Regierung 1955 – 1978. VS-Verlag für Sozialwissenschaften, Wiesbaden 2007, ISBN 978-3-531-91390-2.
