= Doris König =

German judge

15th Vice-president of the Federal Constitutional Court of Germany
- In office 22 June 2020 – 7 October 2025
- Nominated by: Social Democratic Party of Germany
- President: Stephan Harbarth
- Preceded by: Stephan Harbarth
- Succeeded by: Ann-Katrin Kaufhold

Justice of the Federal Constitutional Court of Germany
- In office 2 June 2014 – 7 October 2025
- Nominated by: Social Democratic Party of Germany
- Preceded by: Gertrude Lübbe-Wolff
- Succeeded by: Sigrid Emmenegger

President of Bucerius Law School
- In office 1 October 2012 – 2 June 2014
- Preceded by: Karsten Schmidt
- Succeeded by: Karsten Thorn (acting)

Personal details
- Born: Doris König; 25 June 1957 (age 69) Kiel, West Germany (now Germany)
- Education: University of Kiel; University of Miami

Doris König (born 25 June 1957 in Kiel) is a German judge, jurisprudent and public law scholar who served as the Vice President of the Federal Constitutional Court of Germany (German: Bundesverfassungsgericht).

== Career ==
Between 1975 and 1980, König studied law and at the University of Kiel. In 1982 she completed a Master of Comparative Law program at the University of Miami School of Law.

König started her legal career as a judge at the Landgericht Hamburg (Regional Court of Hamburg). Since 2000, she has been a full professor at Bucerius Law School, Hamburg. From 2012 to 2014 she served as Bucerius Law School's President.

She was chairwoman of the board of directors of the International Foundation for the Law of the Sea from 2004 to 2017 and member of the board of the German Academic Scholarship Foundation from 2007 to 2015. Since 2008 she acts as the German member of the Permanent Court of Arbitration.

König's research areas include law of the sea, environmental law, international protection of human rights and law of the European integration.

=== Judge of the Federal Constitutional Court of Germany ===
A nominee of the Social Democratic Party of Germany, on 21 May 2014 she was elected by the Bundestag to succeed Gertrude Lübbe-Wolff as sitting judge of the Federal Constitutional Court of Germany in the Court's second senate. She was inaugurated on 2 June 2014.

In February 2020, together with two other judges (Ulrich Maidowski and Christine Langenfeld), she dissented from the decision by the Court, that the ratification of the Agreement on a Unified Patent Court of 19 February 2013 in Germany was null and void.

On 22 June 2020 she succeeded Stephan Harbarth, who was appointed as the President of the Federal Constitutional Court of Germany, as the Court's vice president and also became the chairwoman of its second senate. She retired from the court upon reaching the age limit of 68 years and was succeeded by Ann-Katrin Kaufhold (as vice-president) and Sigrid Emmenegger (as justice) on 7 October 2025.

== Honours ==
- 2025: Grand Cross of the Order of Merit of the Federal Republic of Germany
