= Schmidbauer =

Schmidbauer is a German occupational surname for a farmer who was also a blacksmith. Notable people with this name include:

- Bernd Schmidbauer (born 1939), former German politician and member of the Christian Democratic Union of Germany (CDU)
- Iris Schmidbauer (born 1986), German high diver
- Maximilian Schmidbauer (born 2001), Austrian cyclist
