= Ferdinand Kirchhof =

German judge, jurisprudent and tax law expert

13th Vice-president of the Federal Constitutional Court of Germany
- In office 16 March 2010 – 30 November 2018
- Preceded by: Andreas Voßkuhle
- Succeeded by: Stephan Harbarth

Justice of the Federal Constitutional Court of Germany
- In office 1 October 2007 – 30 November 2018

Personal details
- Born: 21 June 1950 (age 75) Osnabrück, Nether saxony, Germany
- Occupation: Judge, jurisprudent and tax law expert

Ferdinand Kirchhof (born 21 June 1950) is a German judge, jurisprudent and tax law expert.

== Early career ==
Kirchhof was born in Osnabrück. He served as expert member of the Commission on the Reform of the Federal System of Government (Federalism Commission), established by the Bundestag and the Bundesrat between 2003 and 2004. From 2003 until 2007, he was a member of the Constitutional Court (Staatsgerichtshof) of Baden-Württemberg.

== Judge of the Federal Constitutional Court of Germany ==
Nominated by the Bundesrat on the suggestion of the Christian Democratic Union (CDU), Kirchhof served as a Justice of the Federal Constitutional Court of Germany in the court's First Senate from 1 October 2007, succeeding Udo Steiner. In March 2009, he was elected vice president of the court. In this capacity, he chaired the First Senate from 2010 until 2018.

Notably, Kirchhof presided over the court's 2014 decision according to which the two boards of public broadcaster ZDF had to reduce their share of politicians and other people connected to the state. The state governments of Rhineland-Palatinate and Hamburg had launched a lawsuit after the administrative council, which was dominated by Christian Democrats at the time, decided not to renew the contract of ZDF's former editor-in-chief, Nikolaus Brender, against the wishes of ZDF's director general at the time, Markus Schächter.

== Other activities ==
- Max Planck Institute for Social Law and Social Policy, Member of the Board of Trustees
- Gesellschaft für Rechtspolitik (GfR), Member of the Presidium
- Association of German Constitutional Law Professors (VDStRL), Member of the Board (2006–2007)
- KDStV Hercynia Freiburg im Breisgau, Member (since 1971)

== Personal life ==
Kirchhof is the younger brother of Paul Kirchhof, a former Justice of the Federal Constitutional Court of Germany.

== See also ==
- Federal Constitutional Court of Germany
