= Michael Wolff (philosopher) =

German philosopher

Michael Wolff (13 September 1942, Solingen) is a German philosopher. From 1982 to 2007 he taught as Professor for philosophy at Bielefeld University.

== Life ==
Wolff studied philosophy and classical philology at the universities of Hamburg (under Günther Patzig, Erhard Scheibe, Carl Friedrich von Weizsäcker, and Wolfgang Wieland, among others) and Marburg (under Julius Ebbinghaus, Klaus Reich, and Wolfgang Wieland). He received his doctorate in Marburg in 1968 with a dissertation on the Alexandrian Aristotelian commentator Johannes Philoponus. From 1970 to 1973, he was a fellow of the German Research Foundation in London and Berlin, and in 1974 he was a visiting lecturer at the Technical University of Darmstadt. From 1974 to 1975, he worked as a research assistant at the Max Planck Institute for the Study of Living Conditions in the Scientific-Technical World in Starnberg; from 1975 to 1982, he served as acting chair and lecturer in philosophy at the University of Bielefeld. There, he earned his habilitation in 1978 with a study on the history of the development of classical mechanics (theory of impetus). From 1979 to 1980, he was a visiting lecturer at the Institute of Philosophy at the University of Marburg. In 1995, he declined an offer of a professorship in philosophy at the University of Münster.

He has been married since 1978 to Gertrude Lübbe-Wolff, a former judge on the Federal Constitutional Court of Germany, and they have four children. His father was Hans Walter Wolff, a theologian and professor of Old Testament studies; his mother was Annemarie Halstenbach, the daughter of a factory owner from Wuppertal. His brother is the musicologist Christoph Wolff.

== Work ==
In both his own work and his teaching, Michael Wolff places great emphasis on precision. He regards the writing of a commentary (as in his book on Hegel) as a fundamental philosophical technique. Some of Wolff's works have also been published in English, Italian, Japanese, Korean, Croatian, Czech, and Russian.

In his 1995 book Die Vollständigkeit der kantischen Urteilstafel, Wolff reconstructs Kant's proof of the completeness of the logical forms of judgment listed in this table, engaging critically with Klaus Reich, Lorenz Krüger und Reinhard Brandt. An Essay on Freges Begriffsschrift (1879) is appended to the book. In it, Wolff demonstrates the misunderstandings underlying Frege's rejection of Kant's table of judgments.

Wolffs critic of Frege gave rise to the idea expressed in his book Abhandlung über die Prinzipien der Logik, which was first published in 2005 and second in 2009 (supplemented with a reconstruction of Aristotelian Syllogism including Modal syllogism). In it, Wolff abandons his earlier view that Frege's logical system was Incommensurable with what Kant understood by general logic.

In the first (so‑called "analytic") part of this treatise a logical universal language is developed (by applying language analysis to formal languages) that can be translated into the formal languages of the modern systems of deductive logic. It differs from the formal (conventional) language of syllogistics in that it contains not only concept‑ and judgment‑variables but also an arbitrarily extensible set of descriptive expressions which, like concept‑variables, can occupy the position of the logical predicate or logical subject in judgments. These descriptive expressions are partly concept‑constants (for example ζa = “object named a”) and partly functional expressions of the form ('v) Φ(v). In ('v) Φ(v) the metalogical expression Φ(t) stands for any (n‑ary) elementary or compound quantifiable functional expression with exactly one vacancy, i.e. exactly one free variable v. If v in Φ(v) is bound by the prefix '('v)', the functional expression Φ(v) is transformed into an expression that can occupy the position of a concept (that is, a logical predicate) in judgments. This transformation corresponds to the conversion of a grammatical predicate of the form “is a α” into a logical predicate α.[1] In the logical universal language only expressions of syllogistics are considered as logical constants, namely expressions of logical concept‑ and judgment‑relations. These are consistently understood as non‑truth‑functional expressions (see truth‑function). The syllogistics of Aristotle's Analytica priora is reconstructed throughout Wolff's treatise as a non‑truth‑functional system. By contrast, the use of propositional logical constants and quantifiers in the (Fregean) system of so‑called classical (“Begriffsschrift”) predicate logic is understood as serving exclusively to abbreviate complex expressions of the logical universal language. Elementary logical relations cannot be reproduced at all in this system.

In the second (so‑called "synthetic") part of Wolff's treatise, strictly universally valid basic rules are first laid down — expressible in the logical universal language — according to which (immediate) inferences, (mediate) syllogisms and chain-syllogisms take place. The strict universal validity of these rules rests directly on the meanings assigned, by appropriate usage‑definitions, to the logical constants that occur in them. These rules correspond partly to the basic rules of categorical and non‑categorical syllogistics (including modal syllogistics), and partly to the meta‑syllogistic derivation rules known since antiquity, according to which other rules are derivable from basic rules. After setting out syllogistic and meta‑syllogistic basic and derivation rules, it is shown how Aristotelian syllogistics can be reconstructed without remainder and without contradiction on the basis of these rules. Subsequently, in the second part it is proved that by means of meta‑syllogistic derivation rules the system of axiomatic principles and derivation rules of classical predicate logic (first developed by Frege in his Begriffsschrift) is derivable from syllogistic basic rules if and only if, in addition to these, one declares four elementary rules to be valid which, although they can be expressed in the logical universal language, are not universally valid because their validity does not rest on the meanings of the logical constants occurring in them. The commensurability of syllogistics and classical predicate logic is thereby demonstrated. It is also shown for the systems of non‑classical predicate logic (intuitionistic, relevant, and free logics) that they are derivable from syllogistic rules when one, in addition, assumes as valid those rules which can be expressed in the logical universal language but are not, like the syllogistic rules, strictly universally valid. Since only syllogistic expressions occur as logical constants in the logical universal language, Kant's table of logical forms of judgment remains valid even for the modern systems of deductive logic. For they all without exception contain a common core of strictly universally valid rules and differ from one another only in that, beyond this core, they assume different rules that are not strictly universally valid.

In 2006, Wolff published an introduction to logic (Einführung in die Logik) based on the core ideas of his 2004 treatise. This book explains which fundamental logical rules are tacitly assumed to be universally valid in modern systems of deductive logic. This distinguishes it from modern introductions of the same name: these use the definite article in their titles, even though they almost always deal only with truth functions and so-called classical predicate logic, and at most occasionally cast a brief glance at so-called non-classical systems, while granting syllogistics (if at all) only historical interest. Wolff's Introduction to Logic, however, is not an exercise book, but a logical propaedeutic that explains precisely on which elements all logical reasoning and inference are based.

== Selected publications ==
Monographs

- Essay on the Principles of Logic. A Defense of Logical Monism. Translated by W. Clark Wolf. Berlin / Boston: De Gruyter 2023, ISBN 978-3-11-078486-2
