= Fritz Baier =

German politician (1923–2012)

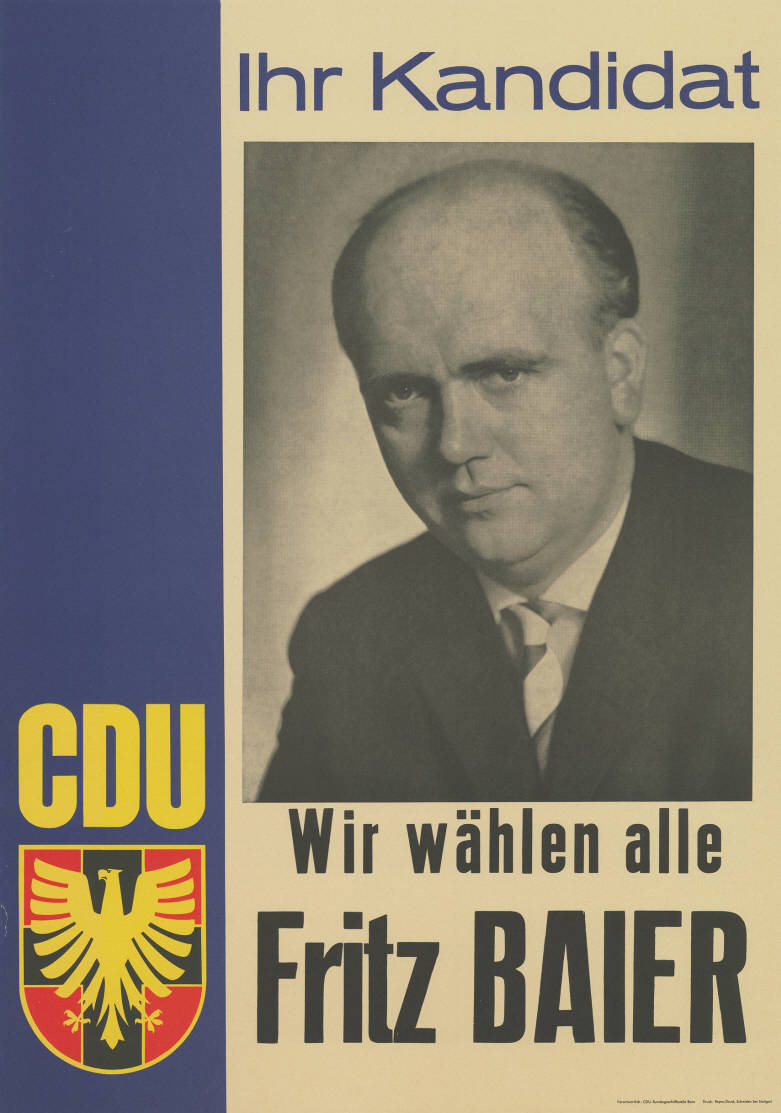
- Election poster (1961)

Member of the Bundestag
- In office 26 June 1956 – 14 December 1976
- Preceded by: Eugen Leibfried
- Succeeded by: Alfred Hubertus Neuhaus
- Constituency: Sinsheim (1957–1965); Heidelberg-Land – Sinsheim (1965–1976)

Personal details
- Born: 2 June 1923 Velká Chmelištná, Czechoslovakia
- Died: 1 March 2012 (aged 88) Mosbach, Germany
- Party: Christian Democratic Union
- Children: 7

Fritz Baier (2 June 1923 – 3 March 2012) was a German politician of the Christian Democratic Union (CDU) and former member of the German Bundestag.

== Life ==
Baier was a member of the German Bundestag from 26 June 1956, when he succeeded his party friend Eugen Leibfried, until 1976. Since 1957 he represented the constituency of Sinsheim in parliament.

== Literature ==
Herbst, Ludolf; Jahn, Bruno (2002). Vierhaus, Rudolf (ed.). Biographisches Handbuch der Mitglieder des Deutschen Bundestages. 1949–2002 [Biographical Handbook of the Members of the German Bundestag. 1949–2002] (in German). München: De Gruyter - De Gruyter Saur. p. 1715. ISBN 978-3-11-184511-1.
