= 2 BvR 739/17 =

2 BvR 739/17 is a case decided on 13 February 2020 by the German Federal Constitutional Court (German: Bundesverfassungsgericht; abbreviated: BVerfG) in which the Court decided that the Act of Approval, i.e. for the ratification, of the Agreement on a Unified Patent Court of 19 February 2013 (EPGÜ-ZustG) in Germany was null and void, because it had not been approved by the German federal parliament (German: Bundestag) sitting with the required quorum.

The case was initiated with a complaint filed in March 2017 by German lawyer Ingve Björn Stjerna and the order was published on 20 March 2020. It was decided by the Court's second senate with Justice Andreas Voßkuhle presiding and Justice Peter Huber acting as judge rapporteur. Among the Court's eight judges, Justices Ulrich Maidowski, Doris König, and Christine Langenfeld dissented.
