= Rhein-Neckar (electoral district) =

Electoral constituency represented in the Bundestag

277 Rhein-Neckar
- Electoral district for the Bundestag
- Rhein-Neckar in 2025
- State: Baden-Württemberg
- Population: 271,100 (2019)
- Electorate: 195,506 (2025)
- Major settlements: Sinsheim; Wiesloch; Walldorf
- Area: 724.8 km^{2}

Current electoral district
- Created: 1949
- Member: Vacant
- Elected: 2025

Rhein-Neckar is an electoral constituency (German: Wahlkreis) represented in the Bundestag. It elects one member via first-past-the-post voting. Under the current constituency numbering system, it is designated as constituency 277. It is located in northwestern Baden-Württemberg, comprising most of the Rhein-Neckar-Kreis district.

Rhein-Neckar was created for the inaugural 1949 federal election. Whilst the Christian Democratic Union won a plurality in the 2025 election, under the new voting system, their candidate did not actually win a seat in the Bundestag. This was due to the distribution of seats won by the CDU being decided by the first (direct) vote percentage of each winning CDU candidate, determining who took the seats. As the CDU candidate got a low vote of 34.4%, the seat will remain vacant throughout the 21st Bundestag.

== Geography ==
Rhein-Neckar is located in northwestern Baden-Württemberg. As of the 2021 federal election, it comprises the entirety of the Rhein-Neckar-Kreis district excluding the municipalities of Dossenheim, Edingen-Neckarhausen, Eppelheim, Heddesheim, Hemsbach, Hirschberg an der Bergstraße, Ilvesheim, Ladenburg, Laudenbach, Schriesheim, Weinheim, Altlußheim, Brühl, Hockenheim, Ketsch, Neulußheim, Oftersheim, Plankstadt, Reilingen, and Schwetzingen.

== History ==
Rhein-Neckar was created in 1949, then known as Sinsheim. In the 1965 through 1976 elections, it was named Heidelberg-Land – Sinsheim. It acquired its current name in the 1980 election. In the 1949 election, it was Württemberg-Baden Landesbezirk Baden constituency 7 in the number system. In the 1953 through 1961 elections, it was number 181. In the 1965 through 1976 elections, it was number 184. In the 1980 through 1998 elections, it was number 182. In the 2002 and 2005 elections, it was number 278. Since the 2009 election, it has been number 277.

Originally, the constituency comprised the district of Mosbach as well as the Sinsheim district excluding the municipalities of Kürnbach, Mühlbach, Sulzfeld, and Zaisenhausen. In the 1965 through 1976 elections, it comprised the district of Sinsheim as well as the Landkreis Heidelberg district excluding the municipality of Eppelheim. It acquired its current borders in the 1980 election.

Election	No.	Name	Borders
1949	7	Sinsheim	Mosbach district; Sinsheim district (excluding Kürnbach, Mühlbach, Sulzfeld, and Zaisenhausen municipalities)
1953	181	Sinsheim	Mosbach district; Sinsheim district (excluding Kürnbach, Mühlbach, Sulzfeld, and Zaisenhausen municipalities)
1957	181	Sinsheim	Mosbach district; Sinsheim district (excluding Kürnbach, Mühlbach, Sulzfeld, and Zaisenhausen municipalities)
1961	181	Sinsheim	Mosbach district; Sinsheim district (excluding Kürnbach, Mühlbach, Sulzfeld, and Zaisenhausen municipalities)
1965	184	Heidelberg-Land – Sinsheim	Sinsheim district; Landkreis Heidelberg district (excluding Eppelheim municipality)
1969	184	Heidelberg-Land – Sinsheim	Sinsheim district; Landkreis Heidelberg district (excluding Eppelheim municipality)
1972	184	Heidelberg-Land – Sinsheim	Sinsheim district; Landkreis Heidelberg district (excluding Eppelheim municipality)
1976	184	Heidelberg-Land – Sinsheim	Sinsheim district; Landkreis Heidelberg district (excluding Eppelheim municipality)
1980	182	Rhein-Neckar	Rhein-Neckar-Kreis district (excluding Dossenheim, Edingen-Neckarhausen, Eppelheim, Heddesheim, Hemsbach, Hirschberg an der Bergstraße, Ilvesheim, Ladenburg, Laudenbach, Schriesheim, Weinheim, Altlußheim, Brühl, Hockenheim, Ketsch, Neulußheim, Oftersheim, Plankstadt, Reilingen, and Schwetzingen municipalities)
1983	182	Rhein-Neckar	Rhein-Neckar-Kreis district (excluding Dossenheim, Edingen-Neckarhausen, Eppelheim, Heddesheim, Hemsbach, Hirschberg an der Bergstraße, Ilvesheim, Ladenburg, Laudenbach, Schriesheim, Weinheim, Altlußheim, Brühl, Hockenheim, Ketsch, Neulußheim, Oftersheim, Plankstadt, Reilingen, and Schwetzingen municipalities)
1987	182	Rhein-Neckar	Rhein-Neckar-Kreis district (excluding Dossenheim, Edingen-Neckarhausen, Eppelheim, Heddesheim, Hemsbach, Hirschberg an der Bergstraße, Ilvesheim, Ladenburg, Laudenbach, Schriesheim, Weinheim, Altlußheim, Brühl, Hockenheim, Ketsch, Neulußheim, Oftersheim, Plankstadt, Reilingen, and Schwetzingen municipalities)
1990	182	Rhein-Neckar	Rhein-Neckar-Kreis district (excluding Dossenheim, Edingen-Neckarhausen, Eppelheim, Heddesheim, Hemsbach, Hirschberg an der Bergstraße, Ilvesheim, Ladenburg, Laudenbach, Schriesheim, Weinheim, Altlußheim, Brühl, Hockenheim, Ketsch, Neulußheim, Oftersheim, Plankstadt, Reilingen, and Schwetzingen municipalities)
1994	182	Rhein-Neckar	Rhein-Neckar-Kreis district (excluding Dossenheim, Edingen-Neckarhausen, Eppelheim, Heddesheim, Hemsbach, Hirschberg an der Bergstraße, Ilvesheim, Ladenburg, Laudenbach, Schriesheim, Weinheim, Altlußheim, Brühl, Hockenheim, Ketsch, Neulußheim, Oftersheim, Plankstadt, Reilingen, and Schwetzingen municipalities)
1998	182	Rhein-Neckar	Rhein-Neckar-Kreis district (excluding Dossenheim, Edingen-Neckarhausen, Eppelheim, Heddesheim, Hemsbach, Hirschberg an der Bergstraße, Ilvesheim, Ladenburg, Laudenbach, Schriesheim, Weinheim, Altlußheim, Brühl, Hockenheim, Ketsch, Neulußheim, Oftersheim, Plankstadt, Reilingen, and Schwetzingen municipalities)
2002	278	Rhein-Neckar	Rhein-Neckar-Kreis district (excluding Dossenheim, Edingen-Neckarhausen, Eppelheim, Heddesheim, Hemsbach, Hirschberg an der Bergstraße, Ilvesheim, Ladenburg, Laudenbach, Schriesheim, Weinheim, Altlußheim, Brühl, Hockenheim, Ketsch, Neulußheim, Oftersheim, Plankstadt, Reilingen, and Schwetzingen municipalities)
2005	278	Rhein-Neckar	Rhein-Neckar-Kreis district (excluding Dossenheim, Edingen-Neckarhausen, Eppelheim, Heddesheim, Hemsbach, Hirschberg an der Bergstraße, Ilvesheim, Ladenburg, Laudenbach, Schriesheim, Weinheim, Altlußheim, Brühl, Hockenheim, Ketsch, Neulußheim, Oftersheim, Plankstadt, Reilingen, and Schwetzingen municipalities)
2009	277	Rhein-Neckar	Rhein-Neckar-Kreis district (excluding Dossenheim, Edingen-Neckarhausen, Eppelheim, Heddesheim, Hemsbach, Hirschberg an der Bergstraße, Ilvesheim, Ladenburg, Laudenbach, Schriesheim, Weinheim, Altlußheim, Brühl, Hockenheim, Ketsch, Neulußheim, Oftersheim, Plankstadt, Reilingen, and Schwetzingen municipalities)
2013	277	Rhein-Neckar	Rhein-Neckar-Kreis district (excluding Dossenheim, Edingen-Neckarhausen, Eppelheim, Heddesheim, Hemsbach, Hirschberg an der Bergstraße, Ilvesheim, Ladenburg, Laudenbach, Schriesheim, Weinheim, Altlußheim, Brühl, Hockenheim, Ketsch, Neulußheim, Oftersheim, Plankstadt, Reilingen, and Schwetzingen municipalities)
2017	277	Rhein-Neckar	Rhein-Neckar-Kreis district (excluding Dossenheim, Edingen-Neckarhausen, Eppelheim, Heddesheim, Hemsbach, Hirschberg an der Bergstraße, Ilvesheim, Ladenburg, Laudenbach, Schriesheim, Weinheim, Altlußheim, Brühl, Hockenheim, Ketsch, Neulußheim, Oftersheim, Plankstadt, Reilingen, and Schwetzingen municipalities)
2021	277	Rhein-Neckar	Rhein-Neckar-Kreis district (excluding Dossenheim, Edingen-Neckarhausen, Eppelheim, Heddesheim, Hemsbach, Hirschberg an der Bergstraße, Ilvesheim, Ladenburg, Laudenbach, Schriesheim, Weinheim, Altlußheim, Brühl, Hockenheim, Ketsch, Neulußheim, Oftersheim, Plankstadt, Reilingen, and Schwetzingen municipalities)
2025	277	Rhein-Neckar	Rhein-Neckar-Kreis district (excluding Dossenheim, Edingen-Neckarhausen, Eppelheim, Heddesheim, Hemsbach, Hirschberg an der Bergstraße, Ilvesheim, Ladenburg, Laudenbach, Schriesheim, Weinheim, Altlußheim, Brühl, Hockenheim, Ketsch, Neulußheim, Oftersheim, Plankstadt, Reilingen, and Schwetzingen municipalities)

== Members ==
The constituency has been held continuously by the Christian Democratic Union (CDU) since its creation. It was first represented by Eugen Leibfried from 1949 to 1957, followed by Fritz Baier from 1957 to 1976. Alfred Hubertus Neuhaus served from 1976 to 1983. Bernd Schmidbauer was representative from 1983 to 2009, a total of seven consecutive terms. Stephan Harbarth was elected in 2009, and re-elected in 2013 and 2017. He resigned in November 2018 after being elected to the Federal Constitutional Court. He was succeeded by Moritz Oppelt in the 2021 federal election. The seat has been vacant since the 2025 election.

Election	Member	Party	%
1949	Eugen Leibfried	CDU	37.8
1953	Eugen Leibfried	CDU	48.5
1957	Fritz Baier	CDU	50.8
1961	Fritz Baier	CDU	48.8
1965	Fritz Baier	CDU	54.4
1969	Fritz Baier	CDU	52.4
1972	Fritz Baier	CDU	51.4
1976	Alfred Hubertus Neuhaus	CDU	53.2
1980	Alfred Hubertus Neuhaus	CDU	50.3
1983	Bernd Schmidbauer	CDU	55.5
1987	Bernd Schmidbauer	CDU	50.0
1990	Bernd Schmidbauer	CDU	49.2
1994	Bernd Schmidbauer	CDU	49.3
1998	Bernd Schmidbauer	CDU	44.2
2002	Bernd Schmidbauer	CDU	46.5
2005	Bernd Schmidbauer	CDU	47.4
2009	Stephan Harbarth	CDU	42.3
2013	Stephan Harbarth	CDU	49.7
2017	Stephan Harbarth	CDU	37.4
2021	Moritz Oppelt	CDU	28.5
2025	Vacant (Note: Moritz Oppelt (CDU) won with 34.4% but seat remained vacant due to insufficient second votes cover.)		

== Election results ==
=== 2025 election ===
Under the new voting system implemented for the 2025 election, although the CDU candidate won the most votes in this constituency, due to the low winning percentage, the constituency seat will remain vacant as not enough second (party) votes were won to be allocated this seat.

Federal election (2025): Mannheim
Notes:	Blue background denotes the winner of the electorate vote. Pink background denotes a candidate elected from their party list. Yellow background denotes an electorate win by a list member, or other incumbent. A ✓ or ✗ denotes status of any incumbent, win or lose respectively.						
Party	Candidate	Votes	%	±%	Party votes	%	±%
CDU	✗ Moritz Oppelt	55,932	34.4	▲5.9	50,684	31.1	▲5.6
AfD	Achim Köhler	33,084	20.4	▲10.3	33,689	20.7	▲10.4
SPD	Dr. Lars Dietmar Castellucci	33,082	20.4	▼6.7	25,577	15.7	▼7.8
Greens	Jürgen Kretz	17,909	11.0	▼3.9	20,053	12.3	▼3.5
Left	Justus Heine	8,276	5.1	▲2.5	10,194	6.3	▲3.4
FDP	Dr. Jens Brandenburg	7,029	4.3	▼7.3	9,194	5.6	▼8.7
BSW					6,549	4.0	
FW	Joachim Helmut Förster	4,754	2.9	▲0.3	2,214	1.4	▼0.4
APT					1,538	0.9	▼0.4
Volt	Mike Kevin Matthes	2,413	1.5		1,437	0.9	▲0.4
PARTEI					740	0.5	▼0.4
dieBasis					422	0.3	▼1.3
Bündnis C					288	0.2	▼0.1
ÖDP					222	0.1	Steady
BD					180	0.1	
MLPD					35	0.0	Steady
Informal votes		1,465			928		
Total valid votes		162,479			163,016		
Turnout		163,944	83.9	▲5.6			
Vacant gain from CDU	Majority						

=== 2021 election ===
Federal election (2021): Rhein-Neckar
Notes:	Blue background denotes the winner of the electorate vote. Pink background denotes a candidate elected from their party list. Yellow background denotes an electorate win by a list member, or other incumbent. A ✓ or ✗ denotes status of any incumbent, win or lose respectively.						
Party	Candidate	Votes	%	±%	Party votes	%	±%
CDU	Moritz Oppelt	43,487	28.5	▼8.9	38,871	25.5	▼8.0
SPD	Lars Castellucci	41,205	27.0	▲3.1	35,847	23.5	▲5.1
Greens	Jürgen Kretz	22,696	14.9	▲5.3	24,072	15.8	▲4.3
FDP	Jens Brandenburg	17,769	11.7	▲3.5	21,941	14.4	▲2.1
AfD	Stefan Holzmann	15,296	10.0	▼3.0	15,701	10.3	▼3.3
Left	Ecevit Emre	4,006	2.6	▼2.6	4,320	2.8	▼3.5
FW	Domenic Arnold	3,979	2.6	▲1.1	2,620	1.7	▲0.8
dieBasis	Michael Dietz	3,238	2.1		2,436	1.6	
Tierschutzpartei					2,033	1.3	▲0.5
PARTEI					1,362	0.9	0.0
Independent	Daniel Schmitt	821	0.5				
Volt					680	0.4	
Team Todenhöfer					614	0.4	
Pirates					546	0.4	0.0
Bündnis C					363	0.2	
ÖDP					275	0.2	0.0
NPD					244	0.2	▼0.2
Gesundheitsforschung					234	0.2	
Bürgerbewegung					142	0.1	
Humanists					134	0.1	
DiB					104	0.1	0.0
LKR					45	0.0	
MLPD					33	0.0	0.0
DKP					33	0.0	0.0
Bündnis 21					31	0.0	
Informal votes		1,588			1,403		
Total valid votes		152,497			152,682		
Turnout		154,085	78.3	▼0.6			
CDU hold	Majority	2,282	1.5	▼12.0			

=== 2017 election ===
Federal election (2017): Rhein-Neckar
Notes:	Blue background denotes the winner of the electorate vote. Pink background denotes a candidate elected from their party list. Yellow background denotes an electorate win by a list member, or other incumbent. A ✓ or ✗ denotes status of any incumbent, win or lose respectively.						
Party	Candidate	Votes	%	±%	Party votes	%	±%
CDU	✓ Stephan Harbarth	57,788	37.4	▼12.2	51,797	33.5	▼10.3
SPD	Lars Castellucci	36,886	23.9	▼2.0	28,486	18.4	▼3.8
AfD	Achim Köhler	20,177	13.1	▲8.5	20,942	13.5	▲7.5
Greens	Memet Kiliç	14,792	9.6	▲1.3	17,687	11.4	▲1.9
FDP	Jens Brandenburg	12,571	8.1	▲5.6	18,933	12.2	▲5.8
Left	Heinrich Stürtz	8,010	5.2	▲1.2	9,738	6.3	▲1.5
FW	Kay-Olaf Ballerstädt	2,255	1.5		1,381	0.9	▲0.3
PARTEI	Simon Schäfer	1,937	1.3		1,376	0.9	
Tierschutzpartei					1,252	0.8	▼0.1
Pirates					615	0.4	▼2.3
NPD					534	0.3	▼1.0
Tierschutzallianz					362	0.2	
ÖDP					327	0.2	▼0.1
DM					259	0.2	
V-Partei³					241	0.2	
BGE					194	0.1	
Menschliche Welt					194	0.1	
DiB					183	0.1	
DIE RECHTE					70	0.0	
MLPD					68	0.0	0.0
DKP					15	0.0	
Informal votes		1,986			1,748		
Total valid votes		154,416			154,654		
Turnout		156,402	78.9	▲4.0			
CDU hold	Majority	20,902	13.5	▼10.3			

=== 2013 election ===
Federal election (2013): Rhein-Neckar
Notes:	Blue background denotes the winner of the electorate vote. Pink background denotes a candidate elected from their party list. Yellow background denotes an electorate win by a list member, or other incumbent. A ✓ or ✗ denotes status of any incumbent, win or lose respectively.						
Party	Candidate	Votes	%	±%	Party votes	%	±%
CDU	✓ Stephan Harbarth	72,271	49.7	▲7.4	63,876	43.8	▲8.7
SPD	Lars Castellucci	37,724	25.9	▲0.8	32,456	22.3	▲1.6
Greens	Edith Wolber	12,031	8.3	▼2.3	13,912	9.5	▼2.2
AfD	Sabine Knur	6,675	4.6		8,786	6.0	
Left	Bernd Malmberg	5,824	4.0	▼3.5	6,959	4.8	▼3.0
Pirates	Andreas Hahn	3,866	2.7		3,909	2.7	▲0.6
FDP	Jens Brandenburg	3,709	2.5	▼10.1	9,444	6.5	▼12.0
NPD	Reinhard Schätz	2,040	1.4	▼0.5	1,936	1.3	0.0
Tierschutzpartei					1,255	0.9	▲0.1
FW					932	0.6	
ÖDP	Johannes Zimmerer	759	0.5		421	0.3	0.0
REP	Peter Herbold	655	0.5		591	0.4	▼0.3
RENTNER					342	0.2	
Volksabstimmung					267	0.2	0.0
PBC					264	0.2	▼0.2
Party of Reason					146	0.1	
PRO					125	0.1	
BIG					72	0.0	
MLPD					36	0.0	0.0
BüSo					18	0.0	0.0
Informal votes		2,228			2,035		
Total valid votes		145,554			145,747		
Turnout		147,782	74.9	▲1.3			
CDU hold	Majority	34,997	23.8	▲6.6			

=== 2009 election ===
Federal election (2009): Rhein-Neckar
Notes:	Blue background denotes the winner of the electorate vote. Pink background denotes a candidate elected from their party list. Yellow background denotes an electorate win by a list member, or other incumbent. A ✓ or ✗ denotes status of any incumbent, win or lose respectively.						
Party	Candidate	Votes	%	±%	Party votes	%	±%
CDU	Stephan Harbarth	59,755	42.3	▼5.1	49,922	35.2	▼4.5
SPD	Lars Castellucci	35,426	25.1	▼11.8	29,356	20.7	▼10.1
FDP	Jörg Richter	17,833	12.6	▲8.1	26,191	18.5	▲6.5
Greens	Charlotte Schneidewind-Hartnagel	14,952	10.6	▲4.8	16,723	11.8	▲2.3
Left	Edgar Wunder	10,596	7.5	▲4.0	11,078	7.8	▲3.7
Pirates					2,970	2.1	
NPD	Andreas Schäfer	2,725	1.9	0.0	1,894	1.3	▼0.1
Tierschutzpartei					1,060	0.7	
REP					979	0.7	▼0.1
PBC					489	0.3	▼0.1
ÖDP					406	0.3	
Volksabstimmung					328	0.2	
DIE VIOLETTEN					267	0.2	
DVU					95	0.1	
ADM					66	0.0	
BüSo					65	0.0	0.0
MLPD					49	0.0	0.0
Informal votes		2,928			2,277		
Total valid votes		141,287			141,938		
Turnout		144,215	73.6	▼7.0			
CDU hold	Majority	24,329	17.2	▲6.7			

=== 2005 election ===
Federal election (2005):Rhein-Neckar
Notes:	Blue background denotes the winner of the electorate vote. Pink background denotes a candidate elected from their party list. Yellow background denotes an electorate win by a list member, or other incumbent. A ✓ or ✗ denotes status of any incumbent, win or lose respectively.						
Party	Candidate	Votes	%	±%	Party votes	%	±%
CDU	✓ Bernd Schmidbauer	72,382	47.4	▲0.9	60,850	39.7	▼3.5
SPD	Gert Weisskirchen	56,346	36.9	▼3.6	47,142	30.8	▼3.7
Greens	Dietrich Hildebrandt	8,876	5.8	▼0.1	14,574	9.5	▼0.9
FDP	Frei Messow	6,931	4.5	▼1.0	18,332	12.0	▲4.2
Left	Harry Siegert	5,300	3.5	▲2.5	6,301	4.1	▲3.2
NPD	Wolfgang Freund	2,987	2.0		2,168	1.4	▲1.0
REP					1,270	0.8	0.0
Familie					1,139	0.7	
PBC					652	0.4	▲0.1
GRAUEN					626	0.4	▲0.3
BüSo					92	0.1	
MLPD					81	0.1	
Informal votes		3,061			2,656		
Total valid votes		152,822			153,227		
Turnout		155,883	80.6	▼2.4			
CDU hold	Majority	16,036	10.5				
