= Udo Steiner =

Justice of the Federal Constitutional Court of Germany
- In office 13 October 1995 – 1 October 2007

Udo Steiner (born September 16, 1939 in Bayreuth) is a former judge. He was a member of the Federal Constitutional Court of Germany from 1995 to 2007.

== Life and career ==
He grew up in Franconia, and went on to study law in Erlangen, Saarbrücken and Cologne. In 1965, he earned a doctorate with the thesis Verfassunggebung und verfassunggebende Gewalt des Volkes. Subsequently, he earned his Habilitation in 1972, with the thesis Öffentliche Verwaltung durch Private.

In 1973, Steiner was appointed as Professor of Public Law at the University of Erlangen, and subsequently served as Professor at the universities of Göttingen, Bielefeld and Regensburg. He was Dean of the Faculty of Law at Bielefeld University from 1976 to 1977, and in Regensburg from 1988 to 1990. Between 1976 and 1979, he also served as a Judge at the Oberverwaltungsgericht.

He was appointed a Judge at the Federal Constitutional Court in October 1995, and he still continued to lecture at the University of Regensburg. He was retired as a Judge upon turning 68 in 2007, and was succeeded by Ferdinand Kirchhof.

In 2008, he was appointed as the Ombudsman of Deutsche Bahn for victims of railway accidents.

Steiner married in 1967 and has four children.

== Honours ==
- 2007: Großes Verdienstkreuz mit Stern und Schulterband
- 2008: Bayerischer Verdienstorden
