= Bernd Schmidbauer =

German politician

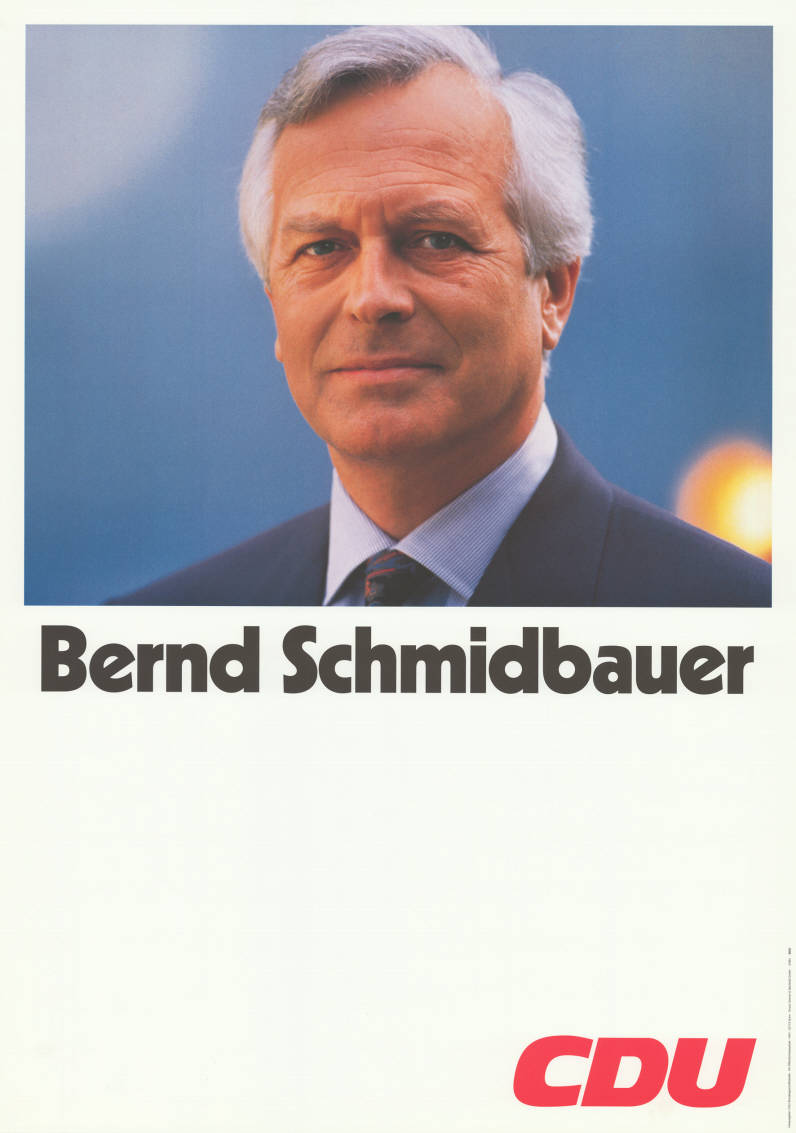

Member of the Bundestag; for Rhein-Neckar
- In office 29 March 1983 – 27 October 2009
- Preceded by: Alfred Hubertus Neuhaus
- Succeeded by: Stephan Harbarth

Personal details
- Born: 29 May 1939 (age 87) Pforzheim, Germany
- Party: Christian Democratic Union
- Children: 3
- Education: Karlsruhe Institute of Technology
- Awards: Order of Merit of the Federal Republic of Germany – Officer's Cross; Decoration of Honour for Services to the Republic of Austria in Silver

Bernd Schmidbauer (born 29 May 1939) is a former German politician and member of the Christian Democratic Union of Germany (CDU).

He was Parliamentary State Secretary to the Federal Minister for the Environment, Nature Conservation and Nuclear Safety from January to December 1991 and Minister of State to the Federal Chancellor from 1991 to 1998, as well as coordinator of the intelligence services.

== Life ==
After graduating from high school in 1959, Schmidbauer studied physics, chemistry and biology at the Karlsruhe Institute of Technology, where he passed the scientific examination in 1967 and the pedagogical examination in 1969. He then worked as a teacher at the Boxberg Gymnasium in Heidelberg, most recently as director of studies.

Bernd Schmidbauer is married and has three children.

== Political career ==
From 1971 to 1989, Schmidbauer was a member of the district council of the Rhine-Neckar district and had been chairman of the CDU parliamentary group here since 1976.

From 1983 to 2009, he was a member of the German Bundestag as a directly elected member of parliament for the Rhine-Neckar constituency. From 1987 to 1990, he was chairman of the Enquête Commission on Precautions for the Protection of the Earth's Atmosphere. In addition, he headed the Environment, Nature Conservation and Nuclear Safety Working Group of the CDU/CSU parliamentary group in the Bundestag from 1988 to 1990.

On 24 January 1991, Schmidbauer was appointed Parliamentary State Secretary to the Federal Minister for the Environment, Nature Conservation and Nuclear Safety in the federal government led by Chancellor Helmut Kohl. As early as 18 December 1991, he moved to the Federal Chancellery as Minister of State to the Chancellor. Here he was commissioner for the federal intelligence services: the Federal Intelligence Service, the Federal Office for the Protection of the Constitution and the Military Counter-Intelligence Service.

Because of his tendency to become active himself in the field of intelligence, Schmidbauer was given the nickname "008" - a reference to James Bond alias 007. In 1992, for example, two German hostages were released in Lebanon, where Schmidbauer was involved in the tough negotiations. In 1994, he secured the release of Helmut Szimkus, a German sentenced to death in Iran. Schmidbauer also had a role in the Plutonium affair. Schmidbauer justified the deployment of Werner Mauss, who negotiated the release of hostages of ELN guerrillas in Colombia on behalf of the German government, as an "emergency humanitarian measure."

He was a member of the Parliamentary Oversight Panel (Parlamentarisches Kontrollgremium - PKGr) from December 2002 and was an assessor on the executive committee of the CDU/CSU parliamentary group from January 2006.

On 16 May 2006, Schmidbauer announced that he was suspending his work in the Parliamentary Control Committee until the allegations against the BND in the so-called journalist affair had been clarified. As justification, Schmidbauer stated that some of the spying on journalists occurred during his time as intelligence coordinator. At the same time, Schmidbauer stated that he had "no knowledge of the events that are the subject of today's discussions."

On 28 April 2008, Schmidbauer announced that he would not run again in the upcoming Bundestag election.
