= Norbert Geis =

German politician (born 1939)

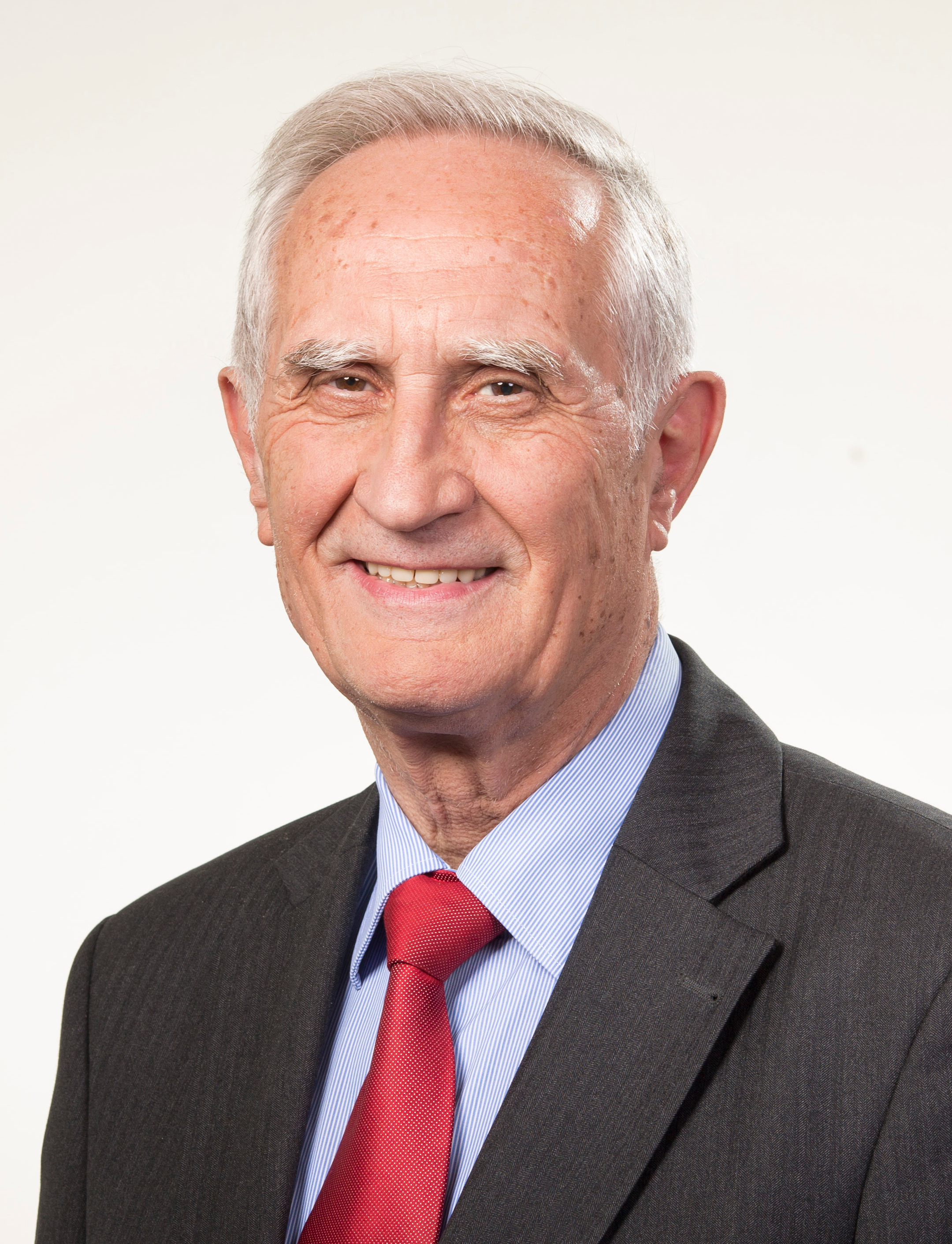
- Geis in 2012

Member of the Bundestag; for Aschaffenburg
- In office 18 February 1987 – 22 October 2013
- Preceded by: Paul Gerlach
- Succeeded by: Andrea Lindholz

Member of the Landtag of Bavaria
- In office 11 November 1981 – 22 October 1986
- Preceded by: Franz von Prümmer
- Succeeded by: Multi-member district
- Constituency: Bad Kissingen (1981–1982); Lower Franconia (1982–1986)

Personal details
- Born: 13 January 1939 (age 87) Großwallstadt, Germany
- Party: Christian Social Union
- Children: 4
- Education: University of Freiburg; University of Würzburg

Norbert Geis (born 13 January 1939) is a German politician. He is a member of the Christian Social Union in Bavaria (CSU).

== Career ==
Geis studied Philosophy, Theology and Law at the universities of Freiburg and Würzburg. Since 1970 he has worked as a freelancing lawyer in Aschaffenburg.

In 1967 Geis joined the Junge Union and the CSU. Since 1972 he has been chairman of the CSU in the administrative district of Aschaffenburg.

From 1981 to 1986 he was a member of the Bavarian Landtag. In 1987 Geis was elected directly into the Bundestag by winning in the electoral district of Aschaffenburg. He defended his direct mandate at the following federal elections. His work for his district has been extremely well received by his constituency, leading to his constantly achieving a higher vote than his party. At the 2009 elections he gained 42,8% of the votes.

== Political positions ==
Geis belongs to the conservative wing of his party, especially on social and legal issues.

He also defended the former CDU member Martin Hohmann, who was expelled after a controversial a speech, stating he has been misunderstood.

In 2003 he called for a "tougher treatment" during interrogations by the police. He said that it had to be possible to threaten somebody with violence, if a human life could be saved in that way. This was in response to an incident involving the deputy police chief of Frankfurt Wolfgang Daschner, who had threatened a child kidnapper with violence and, following that, had been given a suspended sentence.
