= Stephan Harbarth =

President of the Federal Constitutional Court of Germany

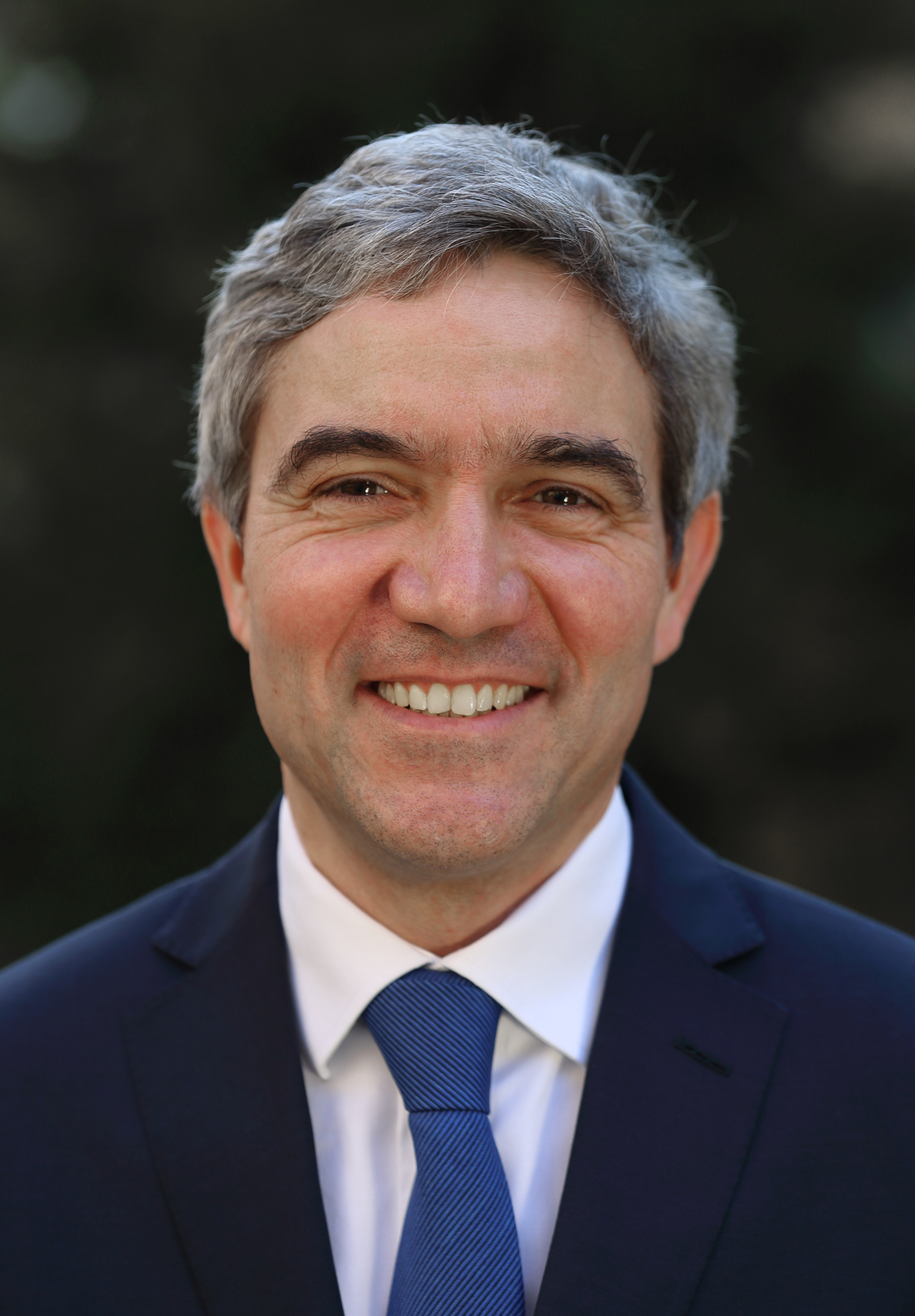
- Harbarth in 2017

President of the Federal Constitutional Court of Germany
- Incumbent
- Assumed office 22 June 2020
- Vice-President: Doris König; Ann-Katrin Kaufhold
- Nominated by: CDU/CSU
- Appointed by: Bundesrat
- Preceded by: Andreas Voßkuhle

Vice-President of the Federal Constitutional Court of Germany
- In office 30 November 2018 – 22 June 2020
- President: Andreas Voßkuhle
- Nominated by: CDU/CSU
- Appointed by: Bundestag
- Preceded by: Ferdinand Kirchhof
- Succeeded by: Doris König

Judge of the Federal Constitutional Court of Germany for the First Senate
- Incumbent
- Assumed office 30 November 2018
- Nominated by: CDU/CSU
- Appointed by: Bundesrat
- Preceded by: Ferdinand Kirchhof

Member of the Bundestag; for Rhein-Neckar
- In office 27 October 2009 – 30 November 2018
- Preceded by: Bernd Schmidbauer
- Succeeded by: Nina Warken

Personal details
- Born: 19 December 1971 (age 54) Heidelberg, Baden-Württemberg, West Germany
- Citizenship: German
- Party: Christian Democratic Union (since 1993)
- Children: 3
- Education: University of Heidelberg; Yale University

Stephan Harbarth (born 19 December 1971 in Heidelberg) is the president of the Federal Constitutional Court of Germany (Bundesverfassungsgericht), former German lawyer and politician of the Christian Democratic Union (CDU). From 2009 until 2018 he served as member of the Bundestag. On 22 November 2018 he was elected to the Federal Constitutional Court by the Bundestag. He succeeded Ferdinand Kirchhof and serves in the court's first senate. On 23 November 2018, one day after his election to the court, he was elected vice president of the Federal Constitutional Court by the Bundesrat. In this capacity, he is chairman of the first senate.

== Education and early career ==
From 1991 until 1996, Harbarth studied law at the University of Heidelberg. He received his Ph.D. in 1998, with a thesis on investor protection in public sector companies. In 2000 completed an LL.M. program at Yale Law School, on a scholarship of the German Academic Exchange Service (DAAD).

From 2006 until 2008, Harbarth was a partner of the international law firm Shearman & Sterling in Mannheim.

== Political career ==
Harbarth became a member of the German Bundestag in the 2009 elections. In his first term, he served on the Committee on Legal Affairs and its Subcommittee on European Law. From 2014 until 2016, he led his parliamentary group's work in the Committee on Legal Affairs and Consumer Protection. During this time, he was the group's rapporteur on the German Stock Corporation Act (AktG).

From 2016, Harbarth served as deputy chairman of the CDU/CSU parliamentary group, under the leadership of successive chairmen Volker Kauder (2016-2018) and Ralph Brinkhaus (2018). In this capacity, he coordinated the group's legislative activities on consumer protection, domestic affairs, sports, and minorities. He was also a member of the Committee on Rules of Procedure, Immunities and Institutional Affairs. In the negotiations to form a coalition government under the leadership of Chancellor Angela Merkel following the 2017 federal elections, he was part of the CDU delegation.

== Political positions ==
In June 2017, Harbarth voted against Germany's introduction of same-sex marriage.

== Personal life ==
Harbarth lives in Mühlhausen.

== Criticism ==
The election of Harbarth as Federal Constitutional Judge is subject to constant criticism because he used to be a successful business lawyer who may have serious conflicts of interests, but in turn this criticism is waved away by his supporters, who naturally view it critically. Aled Wyn Griffiths, editor-in-chief of JUVE Verlag für juristische Information stated his "honest amazement" that a discussion about Harbart's eligibility for election was being held at all. If there were conflicts of interest, according to Griffiths, "[t]he key to this is (...) a definition of bias and conflicts of interest that is so strict and clear that judges know when they should hand in a case. Griffiths added: "If these questions were asked of a member of the Supreme Court in the UK or the US, the reaction would be one of honest amazement. Every British judge was once a practising lawyer. Every member of the Supreme Court there, the Courts of Appeal, literally every single court, has represented special interests of clients in their earlier careers." However, in the United States, at one point in time, a judge at the U.S. Supreme Court, Abe Fortas, who was previously a lawyer in a large law firm, had to resign after a failed election to the presidency of the court because of fees that cast doubt on his independence. By resigning, Fortas forestalled an impeachment.

Harbarth himself sees the criticism as unjustified.

=== Publicly alleged breach of German Statute against financial influence on members of parliament: § 44a AbgG ===
In public, accusations are made that it is not comprehensible in terms of the amount of work involved, how Harbarth could have earned so much money with his legal work during his time as a member of the Bundestag. "So what did Harbarth get his high remuneration for", asked the German newspaper Handelsblatt. Either Harbarth had almost not taken up his mandate as a member of parliament in view of the amount of work invoiced, or had invoiced services as a lawyer without carrying out a corresponding lawyer's activity. The latter would be a violation of § 44a paragraph 2 sentence 3 of the German Member of Parliament Act ("Abgeordnetengesetz" - AbgG): "Furthermore, the acceptance of money or monetary benefits is inadmissible if this benefit is granted without appropriate consideration by the member of the Bundestag" The Bundestag administration has taken these accusations seriously and examined them. The report is not public. Harbarth has never commented on these accusations and has never denied them.

In 2019, two members of the German Parliament filed an action for a declaratory judgment with the Federal Constitutional Court, seeking a declaratory judgment that the election and appointment of Harbarth as a judge of the Federal Constitutional Court was null and void:BVerfG, decision of 2 July 2019 - 2 BvE 4/19. The core of the applicants' argumentation was, according to the summary of the Federal Constitutional Court in the reasons for its decision: "Irrespective of this, there is a deliberate violation of the provision of § 44a of the AbgG that is laid down by simple statute, because the respondent in the second place did not disclose that the Vice-President of the Federal Constitutional Court, in his time as a Member of Parliament, had received substantial, probably overwhelming, property allocations from third, unsettled sources. In view of numerous unclarified detailed questions regarding the income of the Member of Parliament from his former activity as a lawyer, during which he had also been a member of the board of directors and managing director of the law firm, there was a presumption of an inadmissible conflict of interest that was incompatible with the free mandate of a Member of Parliament. He had therefore disregarded Paragraphs 44a and 44b of the AbgG; at the same time, the information which he had provided in an obviously concealing manner had not been verified by the respondent in the second place and had therefore been deliberately mispublished. According to the complainant, this infringed Article 38.1 sentence 2 of the Basic Law, which guarantees a comprehensive right of the Members of Parliament to ask questions, to be informed and to receive information. The untruthful information and the deficiencies in disclosure also led to a violation of Article 97.1 of the Basic Law and the principle of democracy. Since the election, the determination of the election result and the appointment were infected by it, all measures were null and void. (Decision of 2 July 2019 - 2 BvE 4/19, margin no. 10). In the reporting of the legal specialist press, the dismissal of the accusations was received positively, since the accusations were "obviously speculative and made in the open without any external cause".

In the German legal literature the judgement has been received with critical approval. Nevertheless, the leading German constitutional legal scholar Michael Sachs was "irritated that [the court] has taken it for granted that the influence of deliberate misinformation or failure to inform is subsumed under the concept of coercion." Whether the Federal Constitutional Court had at the time of its decision the files of the Bundestag administration with their audit report on Harbarth and § 44 a AbgG at hand is unknown.

=== Cum-Ex transactions ===
Werner Rügemer pointed out, inter alia, that the infamous cum-ex transactions had been concocted in Harbarth's former law firm, and had been 'brought to legal maturity' there, while Harbarth worked there. At the same time, the cum ex mastermind Hanno Berger was active in Harbarth's law firm. Other media also reported that Harbarth worked in a big law firm where the Cum-Ex tax models were first invented.

=== Dieselgate scandal and business mandates ===
On November 28, 2019, a lawyer from the law firm Dr. Stoll & Sauer filed a constitutional complaint against Harbarth's appointment as Federal Constitutional Court Judge on behalf of participants in the test case (MFK) in the emissions scandal against Volkswagen AG. There is concern that the automotive industry and the related industrial complex, such as suppliers, will be given the opportunity to influence the courts in their favor. In addition, he said, there was an unresolved issue of additional annual income in the millions from his time as a member of the Bundestag. On 18 February 2020 (Ref. 2 BvR 2088/19), the Federal Constitutional Court dismissed the complaint. The law firm announced that it would consider taking the case to the European Court of Human Rights.

In an interview with the Augsburger Allgemeine, Harbarth rejected the accusation of bias. In Spiegel, Harbarth had already said in January 2019 that one "could not 'wish for a lawyer to be elected to the Federal Constitutional Court' and then 'consider it fundamentally problematic that this lawyer also had clients'".

Political offices
Preceded by Andreas Voßkuhle	President of the Federal Constitutional Court; 2020–present	Incumbent
Order of precedence
Preceded by Manuela Schwesig as President of the Bundesrat	Order of precedence of Germany as President of the Federal Constitutional Court	Succeeded by last
