= Ingve Björn Stjerna =

German lawyer

Ingve Björn Stjerna is a German lawyer, known for having filed in 2017 a constitutional complaint with the German Federal Constitutional Court (German: Bundesverfassungsgericht) against the ratification of the Agreement on a Unified Patent Court in Germany. In April 2017, his complaint led the German Constitutional Court to ask the President of Germany to suspend the ratification of the Agreement. His complaint, which was assigned court case reference 2 BvR 739/17, was upheld by the Court.
