= Eugen Leibfried =

German politician

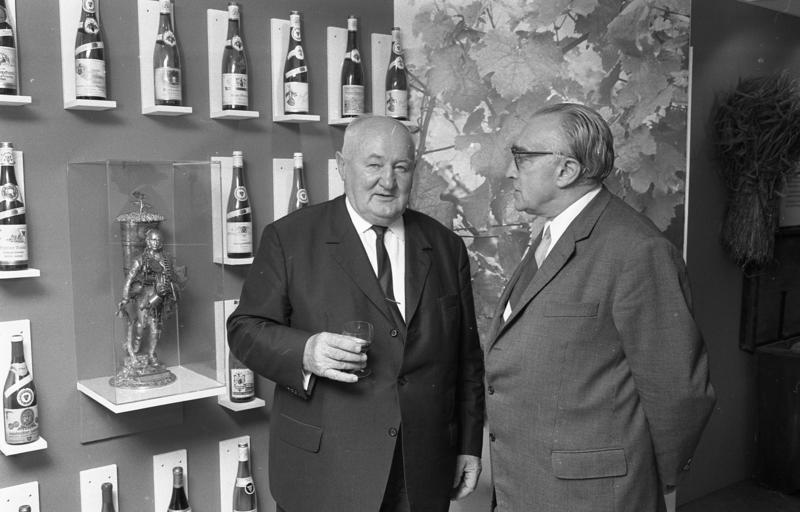
- Eugen Leibfried (centre) next to Adalbert Seifriz (1967)

Minister of Agriculture of Baden-Württemberg
- In office 7 October 1953 – 12 June 1968
- Minister-President: Gebhard Müller; Kurt Georg Kiesinger; Hans Filbinger
- Preceded by: Friedrich Herrmann
- Succeeded by: Friedrich Brünner

Member of the; Landtag of Baden-Württemberg; for Sinsheim
- In office 4 April 1956 – 7 June 1972
- Preceded by: Carl Dornes
- Succeeded by: Paul Herrmann

Member of the Bundestag; for Sinsheim
- In office 7 September 1949 – 21 June 1956
- Preceded by: Constituency established
- Succeeded by: Fritz Baier

Personal details
- Born: 16 April 1897 Guttenbach, Germany
- Died: 12 October 1978 (aged 81) Eberbach, West Germany
- Party: Christian Democratic Union

Eugen Leibfried (16 April 1897 – 12 October 1978) was a German politician of the Christian Democratic Union (CDU) and former member of the German Bundestag.

== Life ==
Prior to joining politics, he was a farmer.

After 1945 he joined the CDU and became a member of the district council of the district of Mosbach in 1946. In 1949 he was elected to the first German Bundestag in the Sinsheim constituency with 37.8% of the vote. In the 1953 election he was able to maintain his direct mandate. On 7 October 1953 Baden-Württemberg's Minister-President Gebhard Müller appointed him to his cabinet as the Minister of Agriculture. Because of his ministerial activities in the state of Baden-Württemberg, Leibfried resigned from his office as a member of the Bundestag on 21 June 1956. From 1956 to 1972 he was then a member of the Landtag of Baden-Württemberg.

In 1975 he was awarded with the Order of Merit of Baden-Württemberg.

== Literature ==
Herbst, Ludolf; Jahn, Bruno (2002). Vierhaus, Rudolf (ed.). Biographisches Handbuch der Mitglieder des Deutschen Bundestages. 1949–2002 [Biographical Handbook of the Members of the German Bundestag. 1949–2002] (in German). München: De Gruyter - De Gruyter Saur. p. 1715. ISBN 978-3-11-184511-1.
