= Ann-Katrin Kaufhold =

German jurist (born 1976)

Vice President of the Federal Constitutional Court
- Incumbent
- Assumed office 7 October 2025
- Nominated by: Social Democratic Party of Germany
- President: Stephan Harbarth
- Preceded by: Doris König

Justice of the Federal Constitutional Court of Germany
- Incumbent
- Assumed office 7 October 2025
- Nominated by: Social Democratic Party of Germany
- Preceded by: Ulrich Maidowski

Personal details
- Born: 1976 (age 49–50)
- Education: University of Passau; Toulouse Capitole University; University of Freiburg

Ann-Katrin Kaufhold (born 1976) is a German jurist who has been serving as vice president of the Federal Constitutional Court since 2025. She has served as chair of constitutional and administrative law at LMU Munich since 2017.
