= Karsten Klein =

German politician

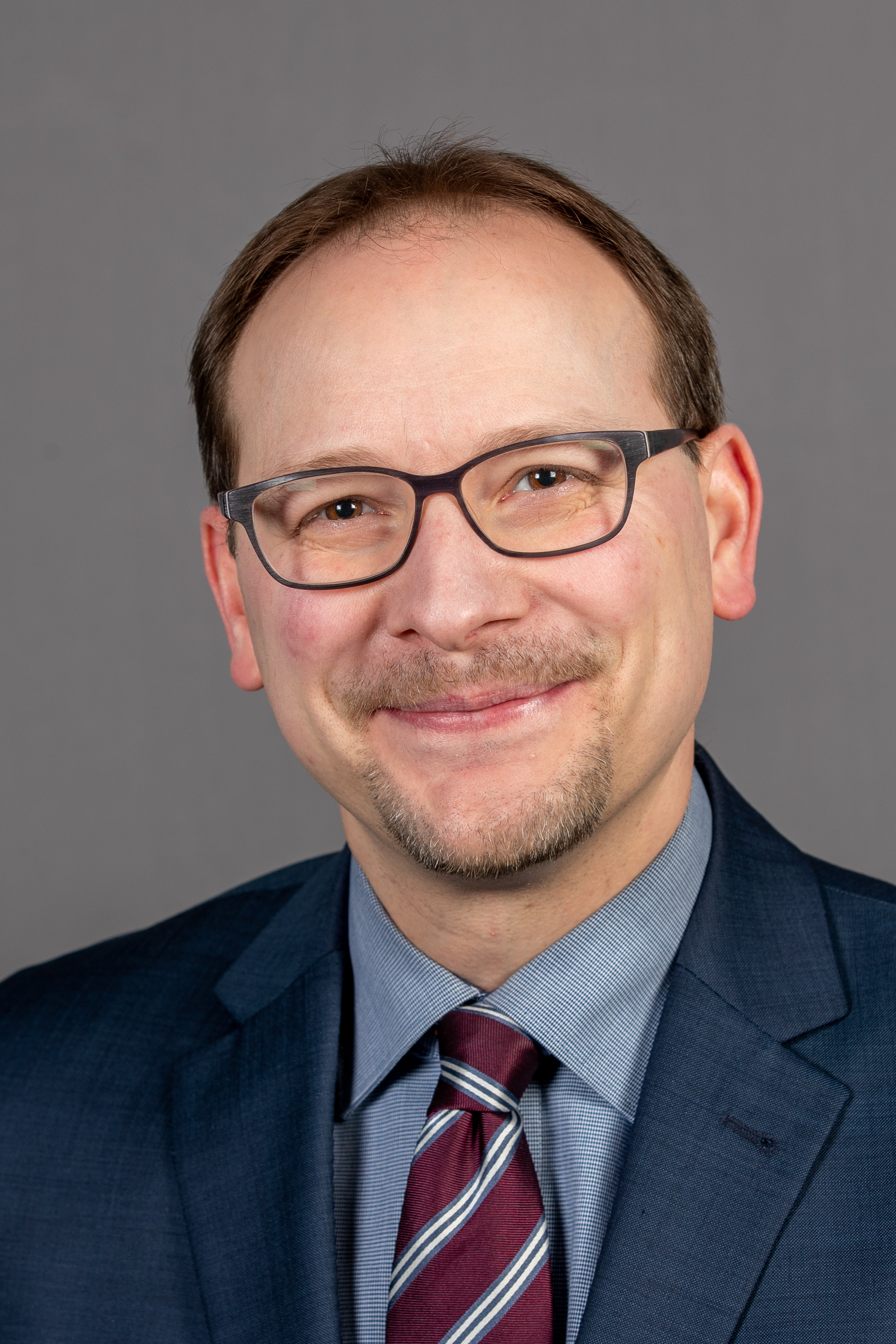
- Karsten Klein in 2020

Member of the Bundestag
- In office 2017–2025

Personal details
- Born: 2 December 1977 (age 48) Aschaffenburg, West Germany (now Germany)
- Party: FDP
- Children: 3
- Education: University of Würzburg

Karsten Klein (born 2 December 1977) is a German politician of the Free Democratic Party (FDP) who has served as a member of the Bundestag from the state of Bavaria from 2017 to 2025.

== Early life and education ==
After graduating from high school in 1999, Klein studied business administration at the University of Würzburg.

== Career ==
Before being elected to the state parliament, Klein was marketing and sales manager of an Aschaffenburg company. He was managing director of the research institution Zentrum für Telematik e. V. in 2014 and worked as a research consultant for EU projects at the University of Applied Sciences in Aschaffenburg from 2015 until he moved to the Bundestag.

From 2008 to 2013 Klein served as a member of the State Parliament of Bavaria. During that time, he was a member of the Budget Committee and served as his parliamentary group's spokesperson on the state's budget.

Klein became a member of the Bundestag after the 2017 German federal election. He was a member of the Budget Committee and the Audit Committee. In this capacity, he served as his parliamentary group's rapporteur on the annual budgets of the Federal Ministry of Health and the Federal Ministry of Defence.
