= Andrea Lindholz =

German politician (born 1970)

Andrea Lindholz MdB
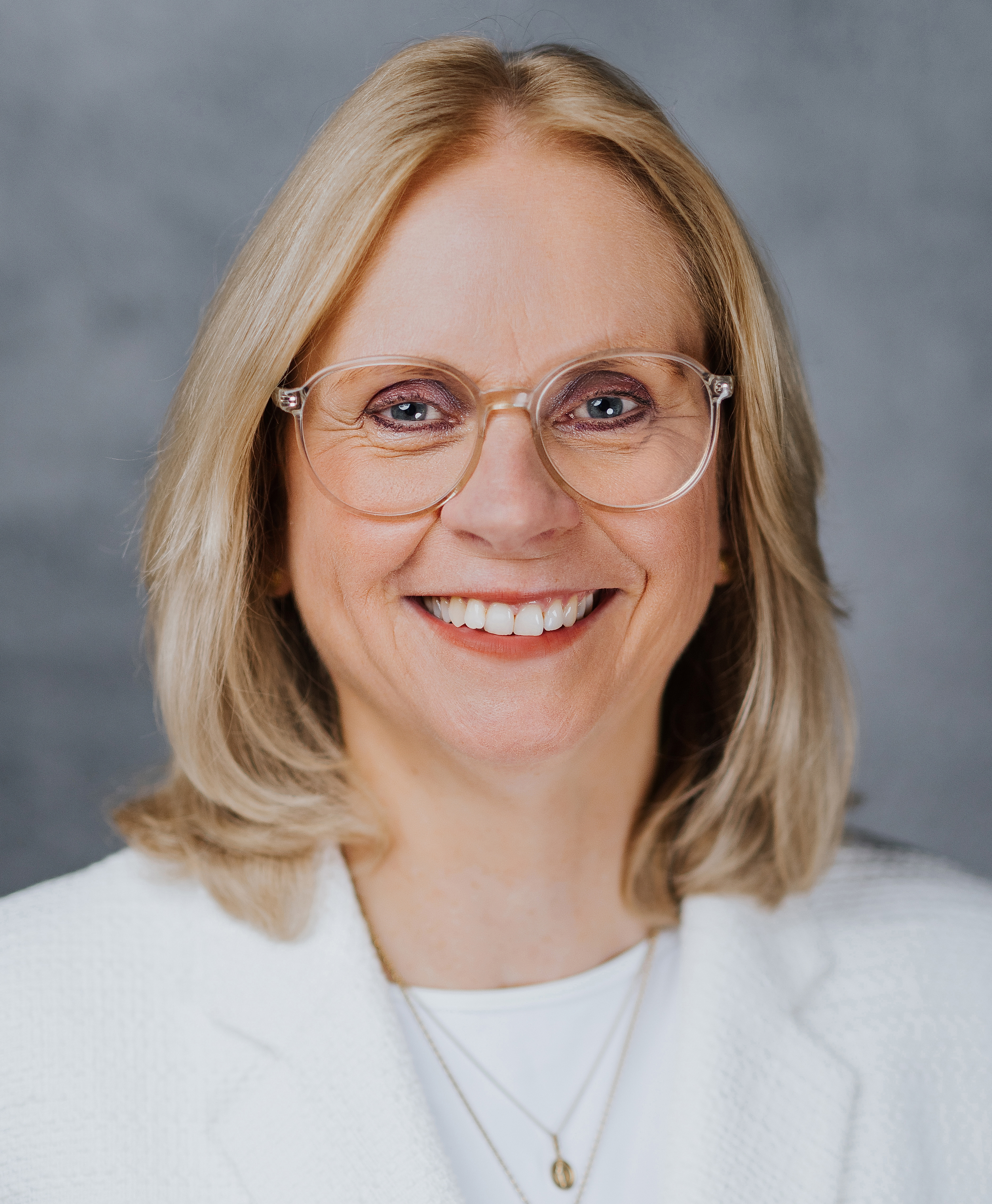
- Lindholz in 2025

Vice President of the Bundestag (on proposal of the CDU/CSU group)
- Incumbent
- Assumed office 25 March 2025
- President: Julia Klöckner
- Preceded by: Yvonne Magwas

Member of the Bundestag; for Aschaffenburg
- Incumbent
- Assumed office 22 October 2013
- Preceded by: Norbert Geis

Personal details
- Born: 25 September 1970 (age 55) Bonn, West Germany
- Party: Christian Social Union (since 1998)
- Children: 1
- Education: Goethe University Frankfurt; University of Würzburg

Andrea Lindholz (born 25 September 1970) is a German lawyer and politician of the Christian Social Union (CSU) who has been serving as a member of the Bundestag from the state of Bavaria since 2013 and as its Vice President since 2025. She represents the Aschaffenburg constituency.

== Early career ==
Born in Bonn, North Rhine-Westphalia, Lindholz studied law at the Goethe University Frankfurt and the University of Würzburg. Since 2000, she has been practicing as a lawyer specialized on family law in Aschaffenburg.

== Political career ==
Lindholz first became a member of the Bundestag in the 2013 German federal election. She is a member of the Committee for Home Affairs. From 2018, she was also a member of the Committee for the Scrutiny of Acoustic Surveillance of the Private Home and the Parliamentary Oversight Panel (PKGr), which provides parliamentary oversight of Germany’s intelligence services BND, BfV and MAD.

In the negotiations to form a fourth coalition government under the leadership of Chancellor Angela Merkel following the 2017 federal elections, Lindholz was part of the working group on internal and legal affairs, led by Thomas de Maizière, Stephan Mayer and Heiko Maas.

From 2021 to 2025, Lindholz served as one her parliamentary group's deputy chairs, under the leadership of successive chairs Ralph Brinkhaus (2021–2022) and Friedrich Merz (2022–2025). In this capacity, she oversaw the group’s legislative activities on internal and legal affairs.

In 2023, Lindholz joined a cross-party working group on dogs.

In the negotiations to form a Grand Coalition between the Christian Democrats (CDU together with the Bavarian CSU) under the leadership of Friedrich Merz and the Social Democratic Party (SPD) following the 2025 German elections, Lindholz led the CSU delegation in the working group on domestic policy, legal affairs, migration and integration; her co-chairs from the other parties were Günter Krings and Dirk Wiese.

== Other activities ==
- Memorial to the Murdered Jews of Europe Foundation, Member of the Board of Trustees
- Technisches Hilfswerk (Federal Agency for Technical Relief), Vice President of the Federal Association
- Foundation Remembrance, Responsibility and Future (EVZ), Deputy Member of the Board of Trustees
- Federal Foundation for the Reappraisal of the SED Dictatorship, Deputy Member of the Board of Trustees
- St Barbara Foundation, Member of the Board of Trustees

== Political positions ==
In June 2017, Lindholz voted against Germany's introduction of same-sex marriage.
