= Jörg Baumann =

German politician (born 1981)

Member of the Landtag of Bavaria
- Incumbent
- Assumed office 30 October 2023
- Constituency: Lower Franconia

Personal details
- Born: 1981 (age 44–45)
- Party: Alternative for Germany (since 2019)

Jörg Baumann (born 1981) is a German politician serving as a member of the Landtag of Bavaria since 2023. He has served as chairman of the Alternative for Germany in Haibach since 2021.
