= Gertrude Lübbe-Wolff =

German academic and senior judge (born 1953)

- Born: 31 January 1953 (age 73)
- Occupations: Academic and senior judge
- Known for: Sits on the second senate of the Bundesverfassungsgericht

Academic background
- Education: Bielefeld University
- Alma mater: Albert-Ludwigs-Universität

Academic work
- Discipline: Law
- Sub-discipline: Public law
- Institutions: Bielefeld University
- Main interests: Constitutional history of the modern age
- Notable works: Rechtsfolgen und Realfolgen. Welche Rolle können Folgenerwägungen in der juristischen Regel- und Begriffsbildung spielen?

Gertrude Lübbe-Wolff (born 31 January 1953) is a German academic and senior judge. She served as a justice of the second senate of the Bundesverfassungsgericht (Federal Constitutional Court of Germany) from 2002 to 2014, having succeeded Jutta Limbach in this position.

== Biography ==
After studying law at Bielefeld University, the Albert-Ludwigs-Universität in Freiburg and Harvard Law School, Lübbe-Wolff received her doctorate in law at Freiburg im Breisgau. From 1979 to 1987 she was a research assistant at Bielefeld, focusing on public law, the constitutional history of the modern age, and philosophy of law. From 1988 to 1992 she was director of the Wasserschutzamt (the municipal authority in charge of water protection and other environmental protection tasks) in Bielefeld. Having turned down a call to Frankfurt University, she became a professor of Public Law at Bielefeld University in 1992. She was Chairperson of the German Council of Environmental Advisors from 2000 to 2002, executive director of the Center for Interdisciplinary Research, Bielefeld University, from 1996 to 2002, member of the board of various national academic and professional societies in the years 1994–2002, and chairperson of the advisory board of Wissenschaftskolleg zu Berlin from 2003 to 2009.

During her tenure on the Federal Constitutional Court (2002–2014), Lübbe-Wolff was the reporting judge for the court's decisions on citizenship, budget and public finance, detentions, and the country's corrections system.

In 2000 Lübbe-Wolff received the Gottfried Wilhelm Leibniz Prize of the Deutsche Forschungsgemeinschaft (the highest German prize for research). She was awarded the Hegel Prize in 2012 and an honorary doctorate (European University Institute) in 2015. She is a member of the Berlin-Brandenburg Academy of Science, honorary bencher of Middle Temple Inn, and honorary member of the Argentinian Society of Constitutional Justice.

== Personal life ==
Lübbe-Wolff is married to the philosopher Michael Wolff and has four children. Her father is the philosopher Hermann Lübbe. The philosopher Weyma Lübbe is her sister.

== Selected publications ==
=== Monographs ===
- Rechtsfolgen und Realfolgen. Welche Rolle können Folgenerwägungen in der juristischen Regel- und Begriffsbildung spielen? Freiburg: Alber, 1980 (online bei Leibniz Publik). ("Legal consequences and real consequences – on the role of arguments as to consequences in rulemaking and juridical concept formation")
- Recht und Moral im Umweltschutz. Baden-Baden: Nomos, 1999. ("Law and Morality in environmental protection")
- Wie funktioniert das Bundesverfassungsgericht? Göttingen: Universitätsverlag Osnabrück, V&R Unipress, 2015 ("How the Federal Constitutional Court works")
- Das Dilemma des Rechts. Über Härte, Milde und Fortschritt im Recht. Basel: Schwabe, 2017 ("The dilemma of law – on severity, leniency and progress in law")
- Beratungskulturen. Wie Verfassungsgerichte arbeiten, und wovon es abhängt, ob sie integrieren oder polarisieren, Berlin: Konrad Adenauer Stiftung, 2022, ISBN 978-3-98574-072-7, availalble online (PDF)
- Demophobie. Muss man die direkte Demokratie fürchten? Frankfurt am Main: Klostermann, 2023, ISBN 978-3-465-04613-4.

=== Editorships ===
- Umweltschutz durch Kommunales Satzungsrecht. Berlin: Erich Schmidt, 1993 (2nd ed. 1997). ("Municipal Environmental Protection by communal Law")
- Symbolische Umweltpolitik (zusammen mit Bernd Hansjürgens). Frankfurt a.M.: Suhrkamp, 2000. ("Symbolic Environmental Policy")
- Effizientes Umweltordnungsrecht – Kriterien und Grenzen (with Erik Gawel). Baden-Baden: Nomos, 2000. ("Efficient Environmental Regulatory Law – Criteria and Limits")

=== Articles (English only) ===
- "Why is the German Federal Constitutional Court a deliberative court, and why is that a good thing?" In Birke Häcker and Wolfgang Ernst (eds.), Counting votes and weighing opinions. Collective judging in comparative perspective. Cambridge (Intersentia Publishing), 157–179.
- "Democracy, separation of powers and international treaty-making. The example of TTIP." In Current Legal Problems 2016, 1–24.
- "How can the European Court of Human Rights Reinforce the Role of National Courts in the Convention System?" (Beitrag zur vom EGMR veranstalten Jahreskonferenz "Dialogue between Judges" 2012). In Human Rights Law Journal 2012, 11–15. (Also available at http://www.echr.coe.int/Documents/Dialogue_2012_ENG.pdf)
- "Who Has the Last Word? National and Transnational Courts – Conflict and Cooperation." In Yearbook of European Law 30 (2011), 86–99.
- "The Principle of Proportionality in the Case-Law of the German Federal Constitutional Court." In Human Rights Law Journal 2014, 12–17. (also available at https://www.researchgate.net/publication/326782433_The_Principle_of_Proportionality_in_the_Case-Law_of_the_German_Federal_Constitutional_Court)
- "Efficient Environmental Legislation: On different philosophies of pollution control in Europe." In Journal of Environmental Law 13, No. 1, (2001), 79–87.
