= Plutonium affair =

1995 smuggling scandal

The so-called Plutonium Affair (German: Plutonium-Affäre) was a scandal that erupted in Germany in April 1995. It was caused by the illegal transport of more than 360 grams of plutonium on a Lufthansa plane from Moscow to Munich in 1994, instigated by the Federal Intelligence Service (BND) just before the Bavarian Landtag elections.

== Smuggling of plutonium ==
In August 1994, the Colombian national Justiniano Torres Benítez and his accomplices, the two Spaniards Julio Oroz Eguia and Javier Bengoechea Arratibel were arrested by Bavarian police at Munich airport and a Munich hotel room. Torres Benítez, who arrived from Moscow on board of a Boeing 737 on 10 August 1994, had 363.4 grams of plutonium-239 in his luggage. The plutonium, however, was only 87% pure, and was thus not deemed weapons-grade. Further, more than 400 grams of Lithium-6, which is needed for the construction of thermonuclear weapons, were found on Torres Benítez.

Torres Benítez, Oroz Eguia and Bengoechea Arratibel were subsequently charged with breaches of the War Weapons Control Act. The trial began on 10 May 1995. While BND president Konrad Porzner had denied accusations of having initiated the smuggling operation in April 1995, a report published in the news magazine Der Spiegel later that month revealed that the BND had, in fact, ordered the smuggling. The deal, which had been concluded as part of the so-called Operation Hades, was meant to serve as evidence that weapons-grade plutonium was for sale worldwide.

The BND was mainly criticized for the fact that its initial investigations had resulted in the smuggling of plutonium to Germany, without any safety precautions and ignoring all related concerns. Further, by involving the Spanish informant Rafael Ferreras Fernandez (alias "Rafa"), the BND had effectively employed an agent of an allied nation, which it is not allowed to do.

== Parliamentary enquiry ==
The revelations of Der Spiegel resulted in the creation of a parliamentary enquiry committee by the German Bundestag on 11 May 1995. Ferreras Fernandez, who had been the link between Peter Fischer-Hollweg, who was stationed as Federal Criminal Police Office and BND representative in Madrid at the time, and the plutonium brokers, testified before the committee that the plutonium was smuggled to Munich on 10 August 1994 with the knowledge of the BND in order to stage an arrest at Munich airport that could be exploited politically before the Bavarian Landtag elections and the 1994 federal elections. Additionally, Ferreras Fernandez stated that he had been put under "enormous" pressure by BND employees before the trial to lie in court, and that he was fearing for his wife's and child's lives.

On 23 June 1998, the committee concluded its proceedings and found that "the BND had not instigated the plutonium case, neither in Munich, nor at its station in Madrid. Further, the BND had informed the Chancellory true to fact and in time, which then had exercised its legal and technical supervision appropriately. There had been no illegal influence from the Chancellory's surroundings on the decisions taken by the authorities involved in this case." Apart from that, "the Bavarian police and the public prosecutor's office in Munich had decided upon the authorities' actions." The plutonium's origins could not be determined. According to the committee, it could only be determined that it did not originate from western Europe.

== Conviction ==
Torres Benítez, Oroz Eguia and Bengoechea Arratibel were sentenced to three to five years of prison in July 1995. The Landgericht Munich found that the plutonium smuggling constituted a case of entrapment instigated by the Bavarian Federal Criminal Police Office, which had enticed the smugglers to procure the plutonium.
