= Lucio Baccaro =

Italian political economist and professor of sociology

Pasquale Vincenzo "Lucio" Baccaro (born in 1966 in Alberobello, Italy) is an Italian political economist and professor of Comparative Macro-Sociology at the University of Geneva. In 2017, he succeeded Wolfgang Streeck to become director at the Max Planck Institute for the Study of Societies next to Jens Beckert. His research lies in the fields of comparative political economy and industrial relations, focusing on growth models in the European Union.

== Education and career ==
Baccaro obtained a Laurea in philosophy with summa cum laude from the University of Rome, La Sapienza, followed by an MBA. Following this, he conducted research at MIT and the Istituto ricerche economiche e sociali in Rome. He earned a Doctorate in Labor Law and Industrial Relations from the University of Pavia, Italy, in 1997 and a PhD in Management and Political Science from MIT in 1999. Subsequently, he had further research stays at MIT and the International Labour Organization in Geneva, Switzerland. Baccaro held several positions at the International Labour Organization from 2000 to 2005 as well as various academic positions in Europe and the US. In 2009 he was appointed professor of sociology at the University of Geneva in Switzerland. In 2017, he became Scientific Member and Director at the Max Planck Institute for the Study of Societies in Cologne, alongside incumbent director Jens Beckert.

== Research activities ==
Baccaro has published widely in a diverse range of fields such as comparative political economy and employment relations, with his most recent co-authored book entitled Trajectories of Neoliberal Transformation: European Industrial Relations since the 1970s. He currently heads the research group on the political economy of growth models at the Max Planck Institute for the Study of Societies and is prominent figure in the literature on growth models. He is member of the American Political Science Association since 1996 and served as executive council member for the Society for the Advancement of Socio-Economics. Baccaro has appeared as commentator on Italy in several news outlets.

== See also ==
- Andrea Montanino
- Dario Scannapieco
