= Alexander Hicks =

Alexander Hicks may refer to:

- Alexander Hicks (sociologist)
- Alexander B. Hicks post-Reconstruction politician in North Carolina
- Alex Hicks, Canadian ice hockey player
