= Thomas Kaminsky =

Thomas Kaminsky may refer to:

- Thomas Kaminski (born 1992), Belgian footballer
- Thomas Kaminsky (artist) (born 1945), German artist
