= Christoph Möllers =

German legal scholar (born 1969)

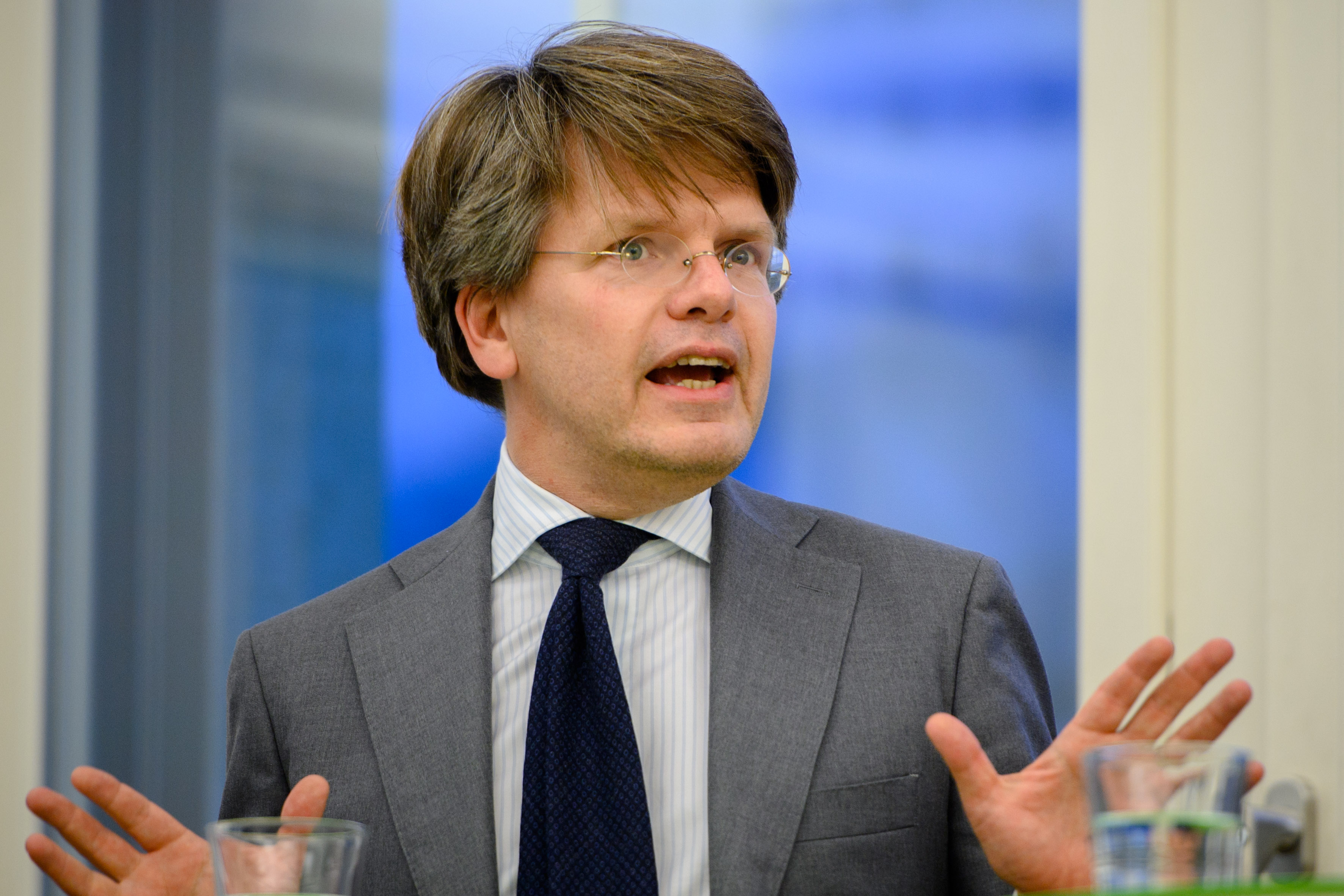
- Möllers in 2014
- Born: February 7, 1969 (age 57)
- Awards: Leibniz Prize (2016); Schader Award (2019); Tractatus Award (2021)

Academic background
- Education: University of Tübingen; LMU Munich (PhD); University of Chicago (LLM); Heidelberg University (Hab.)
- Theses: Staat als Argument (1999); Gewaltengliederung: Legitimation und Dogmatik im nationalen und internationalen Rechtsvergleich (2004)
- Doctoral advisors: Udo Di Fabio and Peter Lerche; Eberhard Schmidt-Aßmann

Academic work
- Discipline: Law
- Sub-discipline: Constitutional law, philosophy of law
- Institutions: Humboldt University of Berlin; University of Göttingen; University of Münster
- Website: www.lehrstuhl-moellers.de

Christoph Möllers (born 7 February 1969 in Bochum) is a German legal scholar. He holds the Chair of Public Law, in particular Constitutional Law, and Philosophy of Law at Humboldt University of Berlin.

== Biography ==
Möllers grew up in Bochum as the son of literary scholars. He began studying law and philosophy at the University of Tübingen in 1989. From 1991, he studied law and comparative literature at LMU Munich, passing his first state exam (J.D.-equivalent) in 1994 and completing his second state exam in Berlin in 1997. He obtained a Master of Laws (LL.M.) from the University of Chicago in 1995. In 1999, he received his doctorate in law from LMU Munich with his thesis Staat als Argument under Udo Di Fabio and Peter Lerche. In 2002, he was an Emile Noël Fellow at the Jean Monnet Centre of New York University.

In 2004, he completed his habilitation at Heidelberg University with a thesis on the division of powers, qualifying him to teach public law, international law, European law, and philosophy of law. Between 2005 and 2009, he served as professor at the universities of Münster and Göttingen. Möllers was also a Fellow of the Berlin Institute for Advanced Study in 2006 and 2007.

In 2009, Möllers assumed the Chair of Public Law, in particular Constitutional Law and Philosophy of Law at Humboldt University of Berlin, where he succeeded Bernhard Schlink.

Möllers has been co-editor of the journal Der Staat since 2006. He regularly publishes essays in Merkur. Since 2020, Möllers has been a Senior Advisor to the Hamburg think tank The New Institute founded by Erck Rickmers.

== Work ==
In May 2007, Möllers presented a study on behalf of the Federation of German Industries that criticised the proposed model for the privatisation of Deutsche Bahn as untenable in terms of constitutional and accounting law.

Möllers was an authorised representative of the German government in the data retention proceedings before the Federal Constitutional Court. He also represented the German government in the proceedings against the Act on the Federal Criminal Police Office and, together with Christian Waldhoff, represented the German Bundesrat in the NPD ban proceedings.

In 2021, his book Freiheitsgrade. Elemente einer liberalen politischen Mechanik was nominated for the Leipzig Book Fair Prize (category: non-fiction/essays).

== Awards ==
- 2016: Leibniz Prize
- 2019: Schader Award
- 2021: Tractatus Award for Freiheitsgrade. Elemente einer liberalen politischen Mechanik

== Memberships ==
- Since 2007: Full member of the Social Science Class of the Berlin-Brandenburg Academy of Sciences and Humanities
- Member of the Association for Constitutional History
