= Lane Kenworthy =

American sociologist

Lane Kenworthy is an American professor of sociology and political science. He has worked at the University of Arizona since 2004, being a full professor since 2007. He is known for his statistical and analytic work on the economic effects of income and wealth distribution. He currently teaches at the University of California, San Diego.

He advocates incremental reforms to the U.S. welfare state in the direction of the social-democratic Nordic model, thereby increasing economic security and equal opportunity.

== Biography ==
Kenworthy was born in New York City and grew up in Atlanta. He received a B.A. in sociology from Harvard University in 1986 and a Ph.D. in sociology from the University of Wisconsin–Madison in 1993. Kenworthy's dissertation was supervised by Joel Rogers, Erik Olin Wright, and Wolfgang Streeck.

Kenworthy worked as assistant professor of sociology at Rochester Institute of Technology 1994–1995 and held the same position at East Carolina University 1995–2000. He worked as assistant professor at Emory University 2000–2004. As of 2014, he is a professor of sociology and political science at the University of Arizona.

Kenworthy played forward for the United States national youth soccer team.

== Income inequality ==
About income inequality, Kenworthy wrote:

As best I can tell from the available data, income inequality hasn't reduced economic growth. It hasn't hindered employment. It may or may not have played a role in fostering economic crises, including the Great Recession. It hasn't reduced income growth for poor households. [...] It may or may not have reduced equality of opportunity. [...] Income inequality has reduced middle-class household income growth. It very likely has increased disparities in education, health, and happiness in the United States. And it has reduced residential mixing in the U.S.

Christopher Wimer of Columbia wrote a scathing review for the journal Social Forces about Kenworthy's book Is Inequality the Problem?, concluding:

It looks like the typical Social Forces book review is about 1,000 words. I’m going to stop this one early and go out for that walk. Apologies to the editors for submitting my review late.

== Selected bibliography ==
=== Books ===
- In Search of National Economic Success (1995) SAGE. ISBN 9780803971608
- Egalitarian Capitalism: Jobs, Incomes, and Growth in Affluent Countries. (2004) Russell Sage Foundation. ISBN 9780871544513
- Jobs with Equality (2008) Oxford University Press, USA ISBN 9780199550609
- Progress for the Poor (2011) Oxford University Press, USA. ISBN 9780199591527
- Social Democratic America (2014) Oxford University Press, USA. ISBN 9780199322510
- Social Democratic Capitalism (2019) Oxford University Press, USA. ISBN 978-0-19-006411-2
- Is Inequality the Problem? (2025) Oxford University Press, USA. ISBN 978-0-19-781710-0

=== Articles ===
- Kenworthy, Lane (January–February 2014). "America's Social Democratic Future". Foreign Affairs. 93 (1).
- Kenworthy, Lane (2013), "Lifting Living Standards in an Open Economy: The Danger of Front-Loading Income Inequality", in Cramme, Olaf; Diamond, Patrick; McTernan, Michael (eds.), Progressive Politics After the Crash: Governing from the Left, London; New York: I.B. Taurus, pp. 157–169, ISBN 9781780767635. Pdf.
- Kenworthy, Lane (2013), "Has Rising Inequality Reduced Middle-Class Income Growth?", in Gornick, Janet C.; Jäntii, Markus (eds.), Income Inequality: Economic Disparities and the Middle Class in Affluent Countries, Stanford University Press, pp. 101–113, ISBN 9780804778244. Pdf.
- Kenworthy, Lane (2010). "Rising inequality, public policy, and America's poor". Challenge. 53 (6): 93–109. doi:10.2753/0577-5132530606. S2CID 154630590. Pdf.
- Kenworthy, Lane; McCall, Leslie (January 2008). "Inequality, Public Opinion and Redistribution" (PDF). Socio-Economic Review. 6 (1): 35–68. doi:10.1093/ser/mwm006. SSRN 1157704.
- Kenworthy, Lane; Hicks, Alexander M. (January 2003). "Varieties of Welfare Capitalism" (PDF). Socio-Economic Review. 1 (1): 27–61. doi:10.1093/soceco/1.1.27. SSRN 811407.
- Kenworthy, Lane (March 1999). "Do Social-Welfare Policies Reduce Poverty? A Cross-National Assessment" (PDF). Social Forces. 77 (3): 1119–1139. doi:10.1093/sf/77.3.1119.
- Bradley, David; Huber, Evelyne; Moller, Stephanie; Nielsen, François; Stephens, John D. (February 2003). "Determinants of Relative Poverty in Advanced Capitalist Democracies". American Sociological Review. 68 (1): 22–51. doi:10.2307/3088901. JSTOR 3088901.
