= Schader Award =

The Schader Award is a German award bestowed annually on a social scientist. It is awarded by the Schader foundation of Darmstadt. The foundation and its award are founded by and named for Alois M. Schader, and comes with a 15,000 Euro prize.

The Schader Prize is awarded by the Darmstadt-based Schader Foundation to social scientists who have made a contribution to solving current social problems on the basis of their academic work and their commitment to practical application.

== Past winners ==
- 1993: three winners in the field of city planning
- 1994: five winners on the theme of age, including Leopold Rosenmayr
- 1995: six winners on the theme of migration
- 1996: six winners on the theme of traffic
- 1997: five winners on the theme of labor and joblessness, including Burkart Lutz
- 1998: no prize awarded
- 1999: Renate Mayntz
- 2000: Meinhard Miegel
- 2001: Peter Graf Kielmansegg
- 2002: Fritz W. Scharpf
- 2003: Hartmut Häußermann and Walter Siebel
- 2004: Bernd Raffelhüschen
- 2005: Ulrich Beck
- 2006: Gesine Schwan
- 2007: Franz-Xaver Kaufmann
- 2008: Klaus von Beyme
- 2009: Ralf Dahrendorf
- 2010: Wolf Lepenies
- 2011: Jan Philipp Reemtsma
- 2012: Paul Kirchhoff
- 2013: Jutta Allmendinger
- 2014: Stephan Leibfried
- 2015: Angelika Nußberger
- 2016: Christine Landfried
- 2017: de:Nicole Deitelhoff
- 2018: Otfried Jarren
- 2019: Christoph Möllers
- 2020: Dorothea Kübler
- 2021: Armin Nassehi
- 2022: Lisa Herzog
- 2023: Steffen Mau
- 2024: Silja Häusermann
- 2025: Martina Löw
- 2026: Sebastian Conrad

== See also ==
- List of social sciences awards

== Bibliography ==
- Tobias Robischon (ed.): Schaderpreis 1997: Burkart Lutz. Schader-Stiftung, Darmstadt 1998. ISBN 3-932736-02-8
- Tobias Robischon (ed.): Forschungsprojekt Umzugswünsche und Umzugsmöglichkeiten älterer Menschen: Handlungsperspektiven für Wohnungspolitik, Wohnungswirtschaft und Dienstleistungsanbieter; Tagungsdokumentation mit Stellungnahmen aus der Praxis. Schader-Stiftung, Darmstadt 1997. ISBN 3-932736-01-X
