= Udo Di Fabio =

German jurist

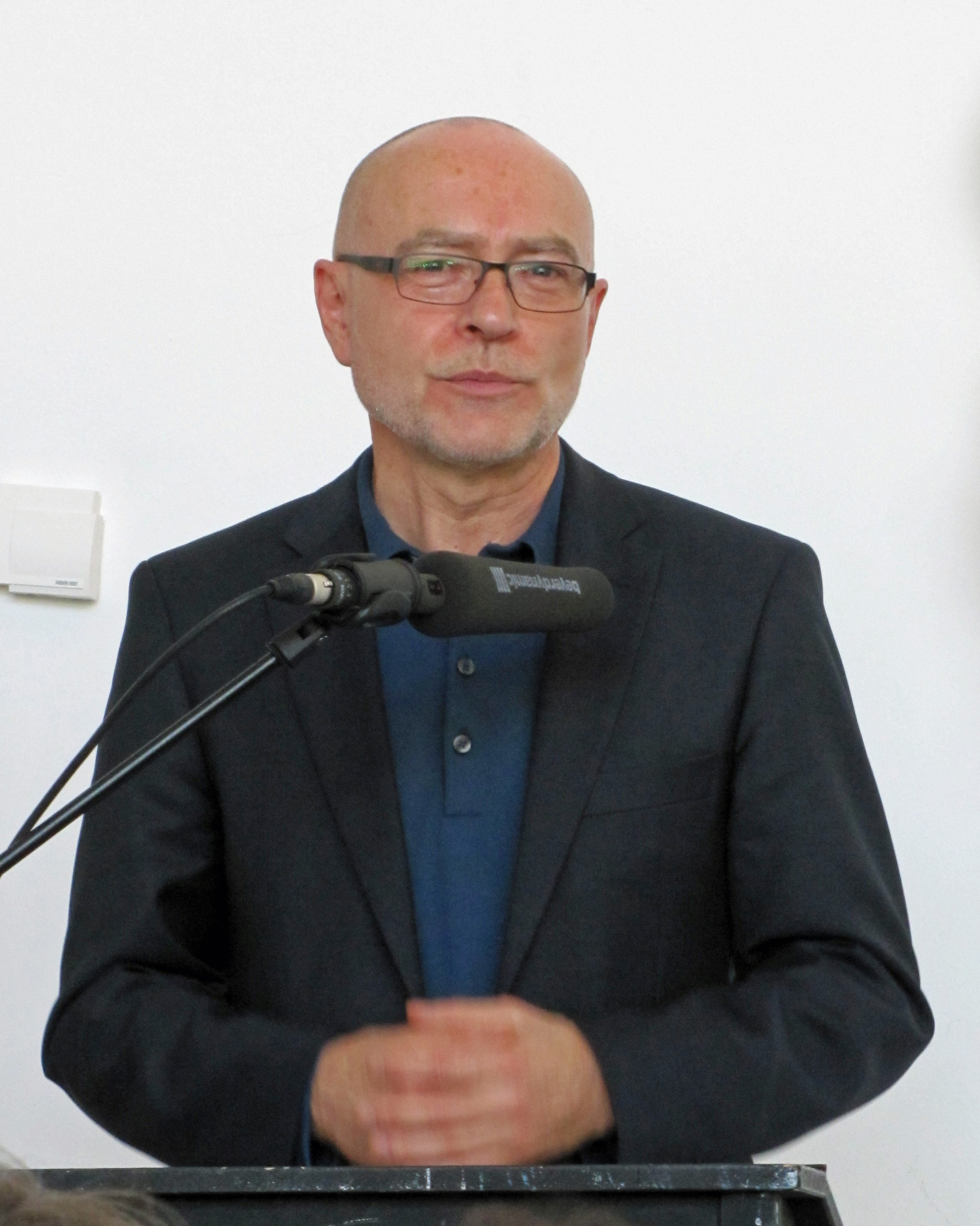
- Udo Di Fabio in Frankfurt, 2012

Justice of the Federal Constitutional Court of Germany
- In office 16 December 1999 – 19 December 2011
- Preceded by: Paul Kirchhof
- Succeeded by: Peter Müller

Personal details
- Born: 26 March 1954 (age 72) Duisburg, Germany

Academic background
- Education: Ruhr University Bochum; University of Duisburg (PhD); University of Bonn (PhD)
- Theses: Rechtsschutz im parlamentarischen Untersuchungsverfahren (1987); Offener Diskurs und geschlossene Systeme (1990)
- Doctoral advisors: Fritz Ossenbühl; Niklas Luhmann

Academic work
- Discipline: Public law
- Institutions: University of Münster; University of Trier; LMU Munich; University of Bonn
- Doctoral students: Christoph Möllers

Udo Di Fabio (born 26 March 1954, in Duisburg) is a German jurist. He is a former judge of the Federal Constitutional Court of Germany, Germany's highest court, where he served as a member of the Second Senate from December 1999 until December 2011.

== Biography ==
In 1970 Di Fabio began as a local government official in middle service in Dinslaken. He completed his secondary school diploma and then studied law at the Ruhr University Bochum as well as social sciences at the University of Duisburg (now University of Duisburg-Essen). After completing the two state examinations in law in 1982 and 1985, Di Fabio was a judge at the Duisburg Social Court. In 1986, he worked as a wissenschaftlicher Mitarbeiter (scientific assistant) at the Institute for Public Law at the University of Bonn. In 1987, he achieved his dissertation Rechtsschutz im parlamentarischen Untersuchungsverfahren, followed by a doctorate in the subject of social sciences in 1990. He completed his habilitation in 1993. Then he was appointed university professor for public law at the University of Münster, followed by a call to the University of Trier. From 1997 to 2003 Di Fabio was a Professor of Public Law at LMU Munich, since 2003 he has been Professor for Public Law at the University of Bonn. From 1999 to 2011 he was Judge of the Federal Constitutional Court. In 2011, he was holder of the Mercator professorship at the University of Duisburg-Essen.

In April 2020, Di Fabio was appointed by Minister-President Armin Laschet of North Rhine-Westphalia to a 12-member expert group to advise on economic and social consequences of the COVID-19 pandemic in Germany.

== Other activities ==
=== Corporate boards ===
- Freshfields Bruckhaus Deringer Germany, Member of the Ethics Committee (2020–2024)

=== Non-profit organizations ===
- Friedrich August von Hayek Foundation, Member of the Board of Trustees
- German Institute for International and Security Affairs (SWP), Member of the Council
- Deutsche Telekom Stiftung, Member of the Board of Trustees
- Vodafone Germany Foundation, Member of the Advisory Board
- Foundation for Family Businesses, Member of Board of Trustees
- German Reference Centre (DRZE), Member of the Board of Trustees

== Personal life ==
Di Fabio is married, has four children and lives in Bonn.
