= Alexander Somek =

Austrian legal scholar

Alexander Somek is an Austrian legal scholar.

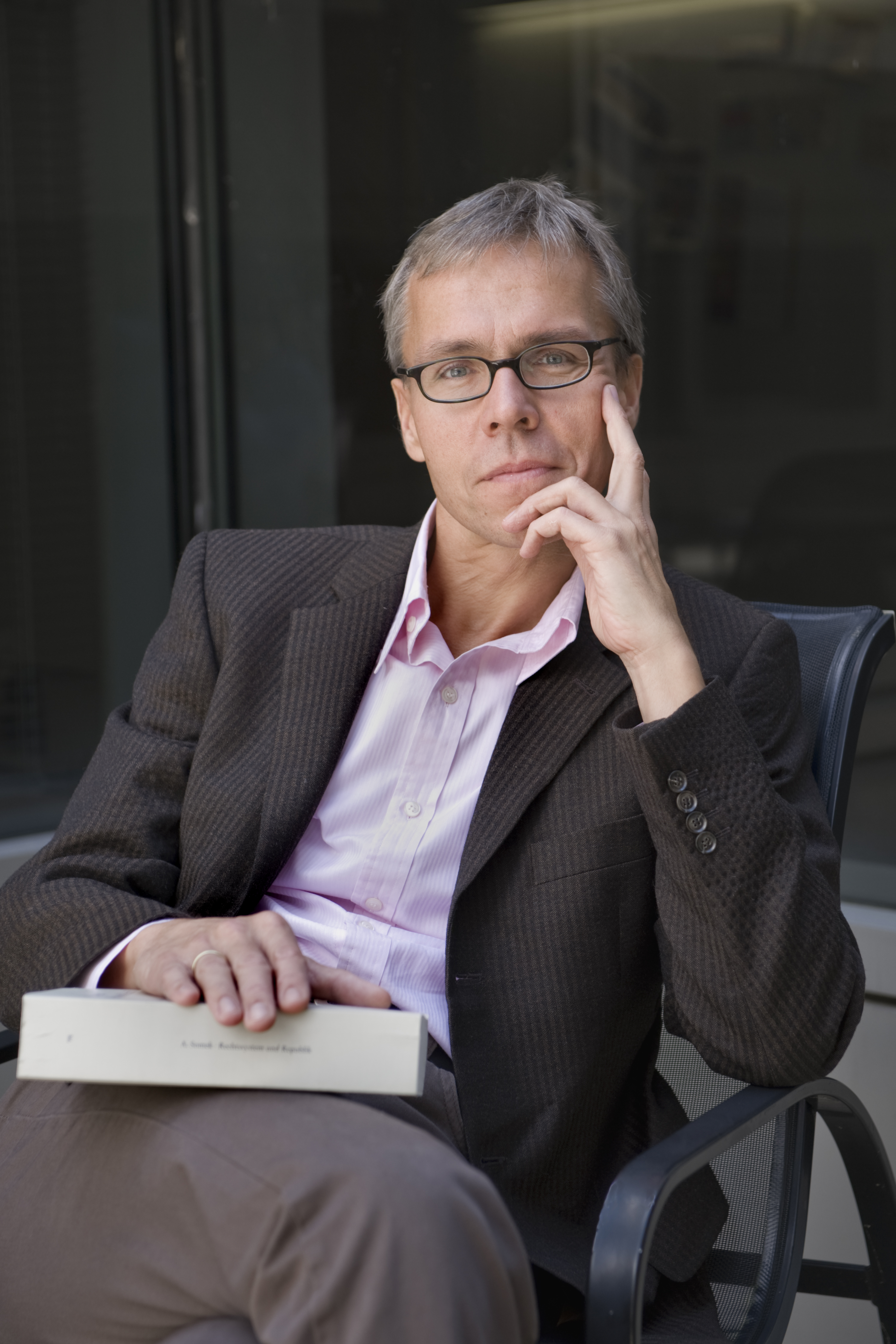
A picture of Alexander

== Life ==
As of 2023, Somek is a professor of legal philosophy at the Faculty of Law, University of Vienna. Previously, he held the Charles E. Floete Chair at the University of Iowa College of Law, and was a visiting professor at Princeton University and the London School of Economics. He was a Law and Public Affairs fellow at Princeton in the academic year 2012-2013 and a fellow of the Berlin Institute for Advanced Study in 2007-2008.

== Work ==
Somek's work has addressed the theory of legal relation, social justice and inclusion, transnational democracy and legal philosophy.

=== Early work ===
In his early work, influenced by the critical legal scholarship of Duncan Kennedy and Roberto Mangabeira Unger who he has cited in his later publications, Somek explored the political significance of systematic legal thought. He attempted to recover and defend its creative and constructive promise, this by contrast to the familiar conceptions of legal doctrine that emphasize fidelity to law qua stable abstract entity that purports to be amenable to description in value-neutral terms. Sceptical of this idea, Somek even went so far as to debunk the idea that ontological import might be granted to the “objective meaning” of norms.

His work in this area grew – in particular with regard to the critique of the reification of the meaning of norms – what he and his co-author Nikolaus Forgó later called “post-positivist legal theory”.

=== Equality ===
In Somek's view, equality imposes limits on rational behaviour that reflect the principle of anti-discrimination. Ultimately, according to Somek, this principle protects people against having to deny who they are.

While defending equality as a moral ideal, Somek does not view protection against discrimination as a panacea against social ills. Firstly, according to Somek, there are various inherent predicaments that it cannot overcome. For example, Somek thinks the principle is only applied after systemic forms of discrimination have already done their work. Secondly, Somek thinks it would be a mistake to view protection from discrimination as central to the realization of social justice. Somek's controversial critique of the ascendancy of European anti-discrimination law examines its various shortcomings and deficiencies. This part of his work also reflects his critical attitude towards the neo-liberal drift of European integration (a matter on which he is in close agreement with Wolfgang Streeck, Fritz Scharpf, Martin Höpner and Michael Wilkinson).

His work on equality is based on the idea that public law is not a bundle of norms, but rather a way of thinking about the normative questions that arise with the exercise of state authority. Somek describes this idea in his book "The Cosmopolitan Constitution".

=== Capitalism’s Effect on Politics ===
After moving to the United States in 2003, Somek tried to explain how the "self-understanding" of people is affected by capitalism, stating that this might lead the demise of political citizenship, on the basis of a reconstruction of various alternative forms of collective self-determination. This was one of the foci of his work on the authority of the European Union and the emergence of a more cosmopolitan type of constitution, where he tried to identify apolitical forms of self-determination that reflect the spirit and the pathologies of modern individualism.

=== Theory of Legal Relation ===
In 2015 Somek began to elaborate his theory of the legal relation. Viewed from a certain angle, his work inherits from the legal positivism of the Vienna School of Law Theory the idea that a theory of law ought to restrict its subject to an utmost minimum of normative idealization. At the same time, however, Somek sharply distinguishes his own project from Kelsen's Pure Theory of Law.

Somek's theory of law has strong affinities to the legal philosophy of German idealism, Romanticism and Marxism. His work on sources of law "Legal Science as a Source of Law: A Late Reply by Puchta to Kantorowicz" written in 2012 combines insights stemming from the German Historical School and from Hegel's Phenomenology.

== Books ==
- Wissen des Rechts (with commentaries by Andreas Funke and Thomas Vesting, Tübingen: Mohr, 2018) [Knowledge of the Law]
- Rechtsphilosophie zur Einführung [An Introduction to Legal Philosophy] (Hamburg: Junius Verlag, 2018)
- The Legal Relation: Legal Theory after Legal Positivism (Cambridge: Cambridge University Press, 2017)
- Rechtstheorie zur Einführung [An Introduction to Legal Theory] (Hamburg: Junius Verlag, 2017)
- The Cosmopolitan Constitution (Oxford: Oxford University Press, 2014)
- Engineering Equality: An Essay on European Antidiscrimination Law (Oxford: Oxford University Press, 2011)
- Individualism: An Essay on the Authority of the European Union (Oxford: Oxford University Press, 2008)
- Rechtliches Wissen [Legal Knowledge] (Frankfurt/Main: Suhrkamp, 2006)
- Soziale Demokratie: Jean-Jacques Rousseau, Max Adler, Hans Kelsen und die Legitimität demokratischer Herrschaft [Social Democracy: Max Adler, Hans Kelsen, and the Legitimacy of Democratic Government] (Vienna: Verlag Austria, 2001)
- Rationalität und Diskriminierung. Zur Bindung der Gesetzgebung an das Gleichheitsrecht [Rationality and Discrimination: A Theory of Equal Pro-tection Review] (Vienna & New York: Springer, 2001)
- Der Gegenstand der Rechtserkenntnis. Epitaph eines juristischen Problems [The Referent of Legal Discourse. Epitaph of a legal Problem] (Baden – Baden: Nomos, 1996)
- Nachpositivistisches Rechtsdenken: Form und Gehalt des positiven Rechts (with Nikolaus Forgó) [Post-Positivist Legal Thought: Form and Con-tent of Positive Law] (Vienna: WUV-Universitätsverlag, 1996)
- Rechtssystem und Republik: Über die politische Funktion des systematischen Rechtsdenkens [Legal System and Republicanism: On the Political Purpose of Systematic Legal Thought] (Vienna & New York, 1992)
