= Desmond King =

Desmond King is the name of:

- Desmond King (American football) (born 1994), American football player
- Desmond King (professor) (born 1957), professor
- Desmond King-Hele (1927–2019), British physicist and author
