= Paul Kirchhof =

German jurist and tax law expert (born 1943)

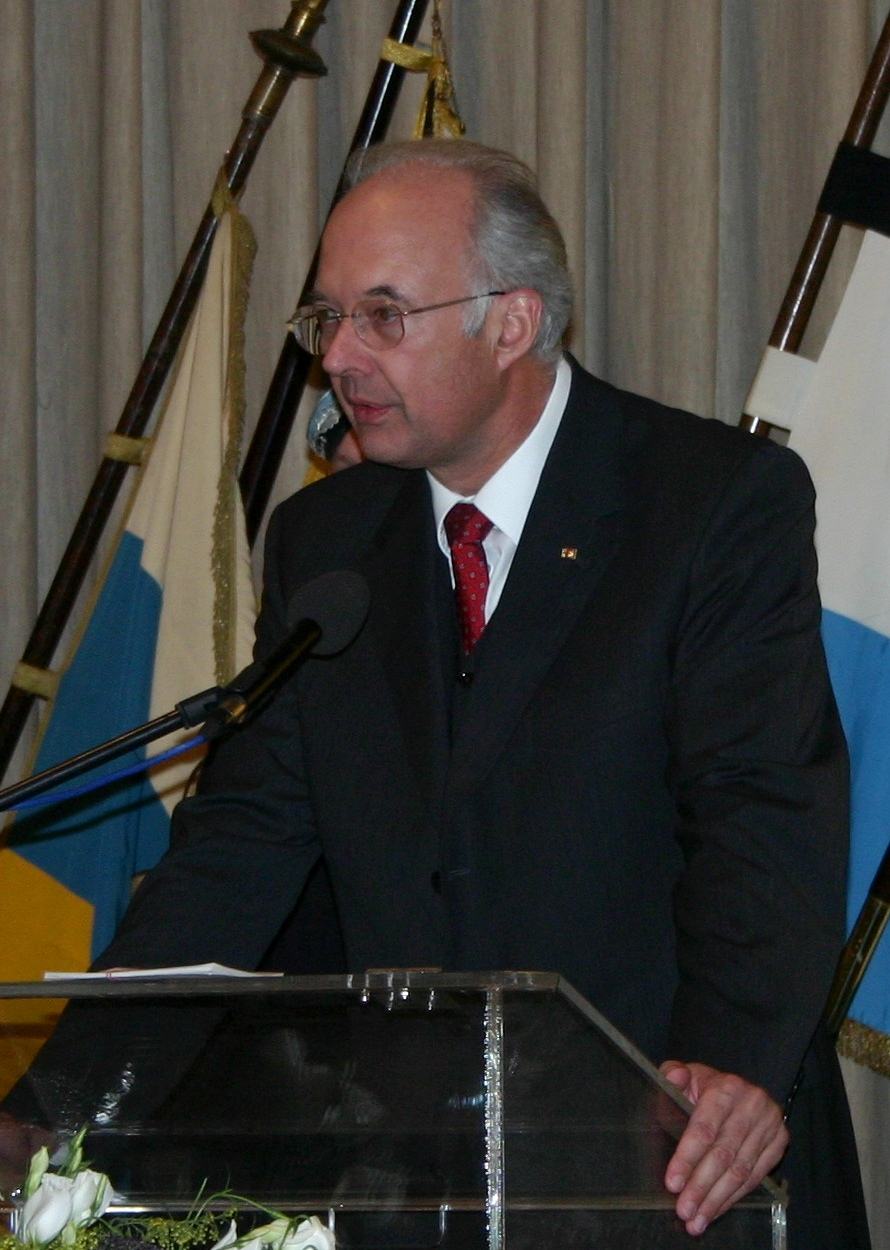
- Born: 21 February 1943 (age 83); Osnabrück, Germany
- Education: University of Freiburg; LMU Munich
- Scientific career
- Fields: Tax law, Constitutional law
- Workplaces: Heidelberg University

Paul Kirchhof (born 21 February 1943) is a German jurist and tax law expert. He is also a professor of law, member of the Pontifical Academy of Social Sciences and, a former judge in the Federal Constitutional Court of Germany (Bundesverfassungsgericht), the highest court in Germany.

== Career ==
Kirchhof obtained a doctorate at the early age of 25 having studied law at the University of Freiburg and LMU Munich. He then became director of the Institute for Tax Law (Institut für Steuerrecht) at the University of Münster. In 1987, he was finally appointed to the Federal Constitutional Court of Germany in Karlsruhe, where he remained a judge until 1999. He then assumed the position of professor at the University of Heidelberg School of Law.

From January until March 2000, with former President Roman Herzog and former Bundesbank president Hans Tietmeyer, Kirchhof led an independent commission to investigate the CDU donations scandal.

During the 2005 federal election campaign, Angela Merkel, leader of the CDU/CSU, announced that Kirchhof would serve as minister of finance if she formed a government. Kirchhof proposed a graduated income tax rate of 15, 20, and 25%. Chancellor Gerhard Schröder successfully mocked Kirchhof during the SPD's campaign, calling him "that professor from Heidelberg", implying Kirchhof an ivory-towered point of view.

This proposal undermined the CDU's credibility on economic affairs and led many Germans to believe that the party's platform for deregulation would only benefit the rich. It was a major contribution to the CDU's drop in the polls, from a lead of 21% over the SPD at the start of the election campaign to 9%. Merkel's own popularity dropped 10% when she publicly endorsed Kirchhof's tax proposals. Although Merkel's popularity improved after she later distanced herself from Kirchhof's proposals, the CDU did not recover its earlier large lead in the polls. Kirchof attempted to bring the matter to a close before polling day by indicating that he would be remaining in academia and would not accept a position in government.

Kirchhof has very conservative opinions on issues such as family and feminism, although these did not become an issue during the campaign. He has been quoted as saying that "the mother's career lies in the family, which doesn't produce power, but friendship, not money, but happiness."

After the election of Matteo Renzi as Prime Minister of Italy, there has been contact with Paul Kirchhof.

== Other activities ==
- Konrad Adenauer Foundation (KAS), Member of the Board of Trustees
- Steuerrechtswissenschaftliche Vereinigung Heidelberg, Founding Member and Member of the Advisory Council

== Honours and awards ==
- Great Cross of Merit with Star and Sash of the Federal Republic of Germany (1999)
- Austrian Cross of Honour for Science and Art, 1st class (1999)
- Commander's Cross of the Order of St. Sylvester (Vatican, 2002)
- Order of Merit of Baden-Württemberg (2003)
- Lichtenberg Medal of the Göttingen Academy of Sciences (2004)
- Bavarian Order of Merit (2006)
- Honorary doctorates (Dr. iur. hc) from the University of Osnabrück (2006) and the Ukrainian Free University in Munich (2008)

Kirchhof has been awarded the following prizes:

- Heinrich Braun Award (2000)
- Ludwig Erhard Prize (2000)
- Hanns Martin Schleyer Prize (2001)
- Eugen-Bolz-Prize (2001)
- Georg von Hertling Medal of Kartellverband katholischer deutscher Studentenvereine (2001)
- Oswald von Nell-Breuning-Prize (2003)
- Reformer of the year. (Readers of FAS and the INSM, 2005)
- Jacob Grimm Prize for his contributions to the German language the language of law and the German language rights (2005)
- German Business Award (2005) of the 'market-intern' publishing in part due to his courageous commitment to honesty and practicality in the tax
- Pforzheim University Business Science Award for 2006 (www.hs-pforzheim.de)
- Ludwig Erhard Medal for Meritorious Service to the Social Market Economy (2007)
- Heinz-Herbert Karry award for achievement in the growth and expansion of free, democratic and welfare state (2007)
- Friedrich August von Hayek Prize (2009)
- Augustin Bea Prize (2009)
- "Mastermind 2011", Award of financial consulting firm Plansecur
- Schader Award (2012)

== Personal life ==
Kirchhof is the older brother of sitting Federal Constitutional Court Justice Ferdinand Kirchhof.
