= Karl Vossler =

German philologist (1872–1949)

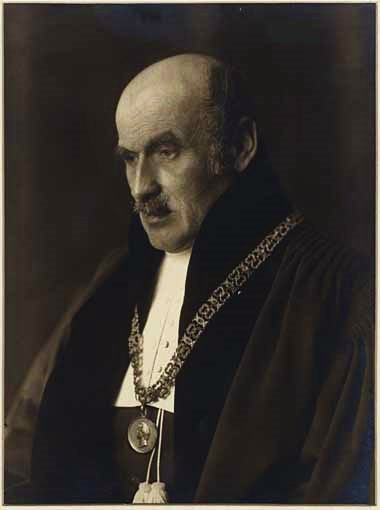
- Karl Vossler (1926)
- Born: 6 September 1872; Hohenheim, Württemberg, Germany
- Died: 19 September 1949 (aged 77); Munich, West Germany
- Education: Heidelberg University (PhD)
- Occupation: Romanist

Karl Vossler (6 September 1872 – 19 September 1949) was a German linguist and scholar, and a leading romance philologist. Vossler was known for his interest in Italian thought, and as a follower of Benedetto Croce. He declared his support of the German military by signing the Manifesto of the Ninety-Three in 1914. However, he opposed the Nazi government, and supported many Jewish intellectuals at that time.

In 1897, he received his doctorate from Heidelberg University, and in 1909 was named a professor of Romance studies at the University of Würzburg. From 1911 onward, he taught classes at the Ludwig-Maximilians-Universität München.

== Works by Vossler published in English ==
- "Mediaeval culture; an introduction to Dante and his times"; translated by William Cranston Lawton (1929).
- "The spirit of language in civilization"; translated by Oscar Oeser (1932).
- "Jean Racine"; translated by Isabel and Florence McHugh (1972).

== See also ==
- Karl-Vossler-Preis
