= Leslie McCall =

American sociologist and political scientist

- Education: Brown University; University of Wisconsin, Madison
- Scientific career
- Fields: Sociology; Political science; Women's studies
- Workplaces: Rutgers University; Northwestern University; Graduate Center, CUNY

Leslie McCall is an American sociologist and political scientist. She is a Presidential Professor of political science and sociology at the Graduate Center, CUNY, and the associate director of the Stone Center on Socio-Economic Inequality there. She studies wealth and social inequality in American society, as well as opinions about inequality, from an intersectional perspective.

== Education and early work ==
McCall studied Computer Science and Economic Development Studies at Brown University, graduating with a BA in 1986. She then obtained an MA in sociology from the University of Wisconsin, Madison in 1990, followed by a PhD in sociology there in 1995.

In 1995, McCall became a professor of both sociology and women's studies at Rutgers University. She remained a professor there until 2006, when she joined the sociology department at Northwestern University. Since 2017, McCall has been a professor of sociology and political science at the City University of New York. She has several times been an invited or visiting professor of sociology at the Sciences Po, as well as a fellow or visiting scholar at Princeton University and Stanford University.

== Career ==
McCall is the author of two books: Complex Inequality: Gender, Class, and Race in the New Economy (2001), and The Undeserving Rich: American Beliefs about Inequality, Opportunity, and Redistribution (2013).

Complex Inequality studied the multidimensionality of inequality in the United States, given the intersecting impacts of gender, class, and race. Using data from 1980 and 1990 across more than 500 local labor markets, McCall studies the relationship between gender inequality, class inequality, race, and level of education. The book also aims to inform policy proposals that account for the multidimensionality of inequality while seeking to reduce it. In a review of Complex Inequality, the sociologist Maria Charles wrote that it is a "pathbreaking book" because it "actually examines the interrelationships among inequality dimensions and identifies distinct structural mechanisms that underlie each", rather than simply acknowledging the problem that the overlap of different influences poses to inequality studies. The book was named as the first runner-up for the C. Wright Mills Award.

McCall's second book, The Undeserving Rich: American Beliefs about Inequality, Opportunity, and Redistribution, was published in 2013. In The Undeserving Rich, McCall examined the attitudes of the American public towards the contemporary phenomenon of rising wealth inequality. In particular, the book studies the paradox that despite the reality of growing wealth inequality in the US, American public opinion had not appeared to shift substantially on the issue, and there was no major sustained backlash to the increase in inequality. McCall found that while Americans do largely object to wealth inequality on the basis that it undermines equality of opportunity, opinion on the issue does not respond to changes in the real distribution of wealth within society but rather to media coverage of the issue.

McCall has been on the editorial board of several major journals, such as the American Sociological Review and the Socio-Economic Review. She was also an editor of the 2013 thematic issue of Signs: Journal of Women in Culture and Society called Intersectionality: Theorizing Power, Empowering Theory. A 2019 citation analysis by the political scientists Hannah June Kim and Bernard Grofman listed McCall as one of the most cited political scientists working at an American university in 3 different categories: the top 40 most cited women scholars, the top 25 most cited political scientists who earned their PhD between 1995 and 1999 (inclusive), and the top 25 most cited political scientists working in the fields of Public Policy, Public Administration, Public Law, or Political Psychology.

McCall's work on wealth inequality has been published or cited in media outlets like The Washington Post, The New York Times, and CNN.

== Selected works ==
- Complex Inequality: Gender, Class, and Race in the New Economy (2001)
- The Undeserving Rich: American Beliefs about Inequality, Opportunity, and Redistribution (2013)
