= Harald Weinrich =

German classical scholar (1927–2022)

- Born: 24 September 1927; Wismar, Mecklenburg-Schwerin, Germany
- Died: 26 February 2022 (aged 94); Münster, North Rhine-Westphalia, Germany
- Occupation: Scholar

Harald Weinrich (24 September 1927 – 26 February 2022) was a German classical scholar, scholar of Romance philology and philosopher, known for the breadth of his writings.

== Biography ==
He was an emeritus professor of the Collège de France, and held the chair of Romance literature from 1992 to 1998.

Weinrich was born in Wismar, Mecklenburg-Schwerin, Germany, on 24 September 1927. His doctorate and habilitation were from the University of Münster. He took a founding chair at the new Bielefeld University in 1968. From 1978 to 1992 he was at LMU Munich in the new chair of German as Foreign Language, Deutsch als Fremdsprache. He was founder of the Adelbert von Chamisso Prize, developed in collaboration with Irmgard Ackermann, a prize for German literature of non-native speakers.

With his work at Bielefeld University and LMU Munich, he is considered the founder of the academic discipline of Deutsch als Fremdsprache, DaF, the didactics of German as Foreign Language. Academic research and teaching in this field include investigation into the (pre-)conditions for, as well as 'hands-on' didactics of, learning and teaching the language in German-speaking countries as well as abroad.

Weinrich won many literary prizes, including the 1985 Konrad-Duden-Preis, the 1992 Karl-Vossler-Preis, the 1994 Ordre des Palmes académiques, and the 1997 Hansischer Goethe-Preis. His books are widely translated in European languages. He died in Münster on 26 February 2022, at the age of 94.

== Works ==
- Das Ingenium Don Quijotes (1956)
- Phonologische Studien zur romanischen Sprachgeschichte (1958)
- Tempus. Besprochene und erzählte Welt (1964)
- Literatur für Leser (1971)
- Textgrammatik der französischen Sprache (1982)
- Wege der Sprachkultur (1985)
- Textgrammatik der deutschen Sprache (1993)
- Lethe (1997) in English as Lethe: The Art and Critique of Forgetting (2004), translated by Steven Rendall
- Kleine Literaturgeschichte der Heiterkeit (2001)
- Knappe Zeit. Kunst und Ökonomie des befristeten Lebens (2004) in English as On Borrowed Time: The Art and Economy of Living with Deadlines (2008), translated by Steven Rendall
- The linguistics of lying and other essays, University of Washington Press, 2005. ISBN 978-0295985497
- Quante lingue per l'Europa? (2006) Cagliari, CUEC Editore (mit Schriftenverzeichnis bis 2006).
- Wie zivilisiert ist der Teufel? Kurze Besuche bei Gut und Böse (2007)
- Vom Leben und Lesen der Tiere. Ein Bestiarium (2008). ISBN 978-3-406-57822-9
- Über das Haben. 33 Ansichten (2012). ISBN 978-3-406-64094-0
