= Socio-Economic Review =

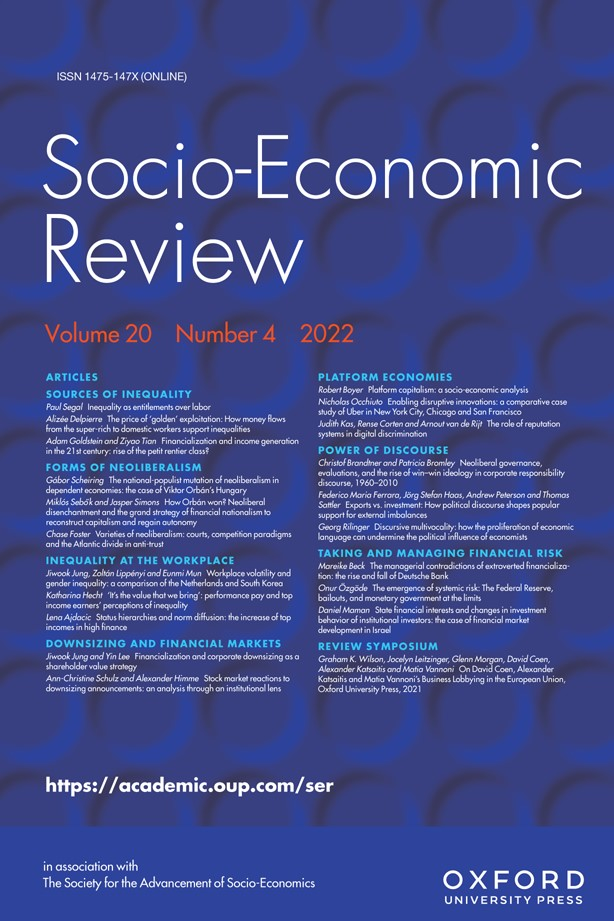
- Discipline: Sociology, economics, political science, moral philosophy
- Language: English
- Edited by: Alya Guseva and Akos Rona-Tas

Publication details
- History: 2003–present
- Publisher: Oxford University Press (United Kingdom)
- Frequency: Quarterly
- Impact factor: 4.058 (2021)

Standard abbreviations
- ISO 4: Socio-Econ. Rev.

Indexing
- ISSN: 1475-1461 (print); 1475-147X (web)
- LCCN: 2004252116
- OCLC no.: 51845062

Links
- Journal homepage; Online access; Online archive

The Socio-Economic Review (SER) is a peer-reviewed academic journal, published quarterly by Oxford Journals for the Society for the Advancement of Socio-Economics (SASE). It is a journal dedicated to the analytical, political and moral questions arising at the intersection between economy and society. Next to double-blind reviewed articles, SER publishes review symposia, discussion forums, presidential addresses as well as editorials.

== History ==
The journal was first published in 2003. Since January 2021, SER is completely online.

The current editors-in-chief are Alya Guseva (Boston University) and Akos Rona-Tas (UC San Diego).

Former editors-in-chief were Gregory Jackson, (Free University of Berlin) 2013–2021, Wolfgang Streeck (Max-Plank-Institut für Gesellschaftsforschung), 2007–2012, as well as Alexander Hicks (Emory University) and David Marsden (London School of Economics and Political Science), 2003–2006, who founded the journal.

The following scientists served as editors for SER: Jens Beckert (2007-2010), Jonathan Zeitlin (2007-2009), Lane Kenworthy (2010-2013), Marc Schneiberg (2010-2017), David Rueda (2013-2016), Don Tomaskovic-Devey (2017-2020), Julia Lynch (2018-2021), Bruno Amable (2010-2022), Nina Bandelj (2010-2022), Patrick Emmenegger (since 2017), Ken-Hou Lin (since 2017), Elvire Guillaud (since 2022), Sebastien Lechevalier (since 2022), and Eleni Tsingou (since 2022).

== Organizational structure and governance ==
The chief editors (editors-in-chief) are responsible for overall editorial decision making, as well as matters related to the editorial policy of SER and the coordination of production with OUP. Editors perform editorial work of selecting reviewers and making decisions regarding the publication of manuscripts, as well as giving input into the overall editorial direction of SER. The chief editor team and the editors meet regularly during editors meetings.

SER has an "Editorial Board" composed of 32 prominent and knowledgeable reviewers working in the various scholarly disciplines and sub-disciplines from which the SER readership is drawn. Members of the editorial board will be appointed for 4 year terms with a maximum renewal of one additional term.

SER has an "Advisory Board" composed of 12 scholars of particular value for the journal. Its primary role is to provide counsel to the editors-in-chief.

SER values diversity and pluralism in persons and ideas. All aforementioned appointments are guided by such values.

According to the Journal Citation Reports, the journal has a 2021 impact factor of 4.058, ranking it 84th out of 379 journals in the category "Economics", 29th out of 187 journals in the category "Political Science" and 25th out of 148 journals in the category "Sociology".

== See also ==
- List of economics journals
- List of political science journals
- List of sociology journals
