= Karl-Vossler-Preis =

German literary award

From 1984 to 2002, the Free State of Bavaria biennially awarded its Karl-Vossler-Preis, named after Karl Vossler, to authors of scientific literature of distinguished literary quality written in German. The award was aimed at fostering the status of German as an academic language and came with a prize money of 25,000 marks until 2000, and 12,500 Euros in 2002. It alternated with the Jean-Paul-Preis, another literary prize biennially awarded by Bavaria since 1983.

== Laureates ==
- 1984: Hubert Markl, biologist
- 1986: Josef Isensee, jurist
- 1988: Wolf Lepenies, sociologist
- 1990: Friedrich Cramer, biochemist
- 1992: Harald Weinrich, linguist
- 1994: Hans-Martin Gauger, philologist and linguist
- 1996: Arnold Esch, historian
- 1998: Peter Gülke, musicologist
- 2000: Dieter Borchmeyer, philologist and dramatician
- 2002: Otfried Höffe, philosopher
