= Renate Mayntz =

German sociologist (born 1929)

- Born: Renate Pflaum; 28 April 1929 (age 97); Berlin, Weimar Republic
- Other name: Renate Mayntz-Trier
- Spouse: Hann Trier

Academic background
- Education: Technical University of Berlin; Wellesley College; Free University of Berlin
- Thesis: Die formale und die informale Organisation in Betrieben und ihre Wechselbeziehungen (1953)
- Doctoral advisor: Otto Stammer

Academic work
- Institutions: Columbia University; Free University of Berlin; Speyer University; University of Cologne; Max Planck Institute for the Study of Societies

Renate Mayntz (née Pflaum) (born 28 April 1929), also known as Renate Mayntz-Trier, is a German sociologist and a pioneer of organizational sociology in Germany. She was the director of the Max Planck Institute for the Study of Societies from 1985 to 1997, and is now director emerita.

== Education and career ==
Mayntz was born in Berlin and lived in Augsburg during her childhood. Her father Walter Pflaum was a professor of mechanical engineering at the Technical University of Berlin. She attended Technical University of Berlin for a year from 1947, majoring in chemistry before moving to the United States, where she continued studying chemistry at Wellesley College. Upon receiving her bachelor's degree in 1950, she went back to Berlin and became a member of the Europa-Union Deutschland. From 1951 to 1953, Mayntz switched fields and studied sociology at the Free University of Berlin (FUB), receiving her doctorate from the university under the supervision of Otto Stammer. She then worked at the UNESCO-Institute for Social Sciences in Cologne until 1957, when she obtained her habilitation in 1957 at the FUB. Mayntz was a visiting assistant professor at Columbia University from 1958 to 1959. She became a lecturer at FUB in 1960 and remained there until 1971, when she was a full professor. In 1962, Mayntz married the German painter Hann Trier. She taught at the German University of Administrative Sciences Speyer from 1971 to 1973 and at the University of Cologne from 1973 to 1985. In 1985, Mayntz became the founding director of the Max Planck Institute for the Study of Societies in Cologne, where she remained until her retirement.

Her areas of research include social theory, management policy, development and application of policies, the development of technology, science and the development of science and policy, and transnationals and the structures of transnational governance.

== Honors and awards ==
Mayntz was an elected member of the Academia Europaea since 1988. In 1999, Mayntz won the Schader Award, Germany's highest accolade for a social scientist, and in 2004 she was awarded the Bielefelder Wissenschaftspreis. Maytz was elected an international honorary member of the American Academy of Arts and Sciences in 2002. In 2006, she was awarded the Prize of the German Sociological Association. She received honorary doctorates from Uppsala University in 1977, from Paris Nanterre University in 1979 and from the Hertie School in 2024.

== Bibliography ==
- Mayntz, Renate (1958). Die soziale Organisation des Industriebetriebes (in German). F. Enke.
- Mayntz, Renate (1963). Soziologie der Organisation (in German). Rowohlt. ISBN 978-3-499-55166-6.
- Mayntz, Renate (1967). Formalisierte Modelle in der Soziologie (in German). H. Luchterhand.
- Mayntz, Renate (1968). Bürokratische Organisation (in German). Kiepenheuer & Witsch.
- Luhmann, Niklas; Mayntz, Renate (1973). Personal im öffentlichen Dienst: Eintritt u. Karrieren : Personaluntersuchung (in German). Nomos-Verlagsgesellschaft. ISBN 978-3-7890-0076-8.
- Mayntz, Renate; Scharpf, Fritz Wilhelm (1975). Policy-making in the German Federal Bureaucracy. Elsevier. ISBN 978-0-444-41272-0.
- Mayntz, Renate; Holm, Kurt; Hübner, Peter (1976). Introduction to Empirical Sociology. Penguin Books. ISBN 978-0-14-080996-1.
- Mayntz, Renate (1978). Soziologie der öffentlichen Verwaltung (in German). Müller, Juristischer Verlag. ISBN 978-3-8114-0778-7.
- Mayntz, Renate; Max-Planck-Institut für Gesellschaftsforschung, eds. (1988). Differenzierung und Verselbständigung: zur Entwicklung gesellschaftlicher Teilsysteme. Schriften des Max-Planck-Instituts für Gesellschaftsforschung, Köln. Frankfurt [am Main]; New York: Campus. ISBN 978-3-593-34030-2.
- Mayntz, Renate; Hughes, Thomas P., eds. (1989). The Development of Large Technical Systems. Routledge. doi:10.4324/9780429309991. ISBN 978-0-429-30999-1.
- Child, John; Crozier, Michel; Mayntz, Renate (1993). Societal Change Between Market and Organization. Avebury. ISBN 978-1-85628-517-9.
- Mayntz, Renate, ed. (1994). Aufbruch und Reform von oben: ostdeutsche Universitäten im Transformationsprozess. Schriften des Max-Planck-Instituts für Gesellschaftsforschung, Köln. Frankfurt; New York: Campus Verlag. ISBN 978-3-593-35179-7.
- Mayntz, Renate; Scharpf, Fritz Wilhelm, eds. (1995). Gesellschaftliche Selbstregelung und politische Steuerung. Frankfurt; New York: Campus. ISBN 978-3-593-35426-2.
- Mayntz, Renate (1997). Soziale Dynamik und politische Steuerung: theoretische und methodologische Überlegungen (in German). Campus. ISBN 978-3-593-35734-8.
- Mayntz, Renate, ed. (2002). Akteure, Mechanismen, Modelle: zur Theoriefähigkeit makro-sozialer Analysen. Schriften des Max-Planck-Instituts für Gesellschaftsforschung, Köln. Frankfurt/Main; New York: Campus. ISBN 978-3-593-37129-0.
- Mayntz, Renate (2009). Über Governance: Institutionen und Prozesse politischer Regelung. Schriften aus dem Max-Planck-Institut für Gesellschaftsforschung. Frankfurt New York: Campus. ISBN 978-3-593-38892-2.
- Mayntz, Renate (2009). Sozialwissenschaftliches Erklären: Probleme der Theoriebildung und Methodologie. Schriften aus dem Max-Planck-Institut für Gesellschaftsforschung, Köln. Frankfurt/Main: Campus. ISBN 978-3-593-38891-5.
