= David Rueda =

Professor of Comparative Politics

David Rueda is professor of comparative politics at Nuffield College, University of Oxford who researches comparative political economy, the welfare state and labour market policy. He is an editor of the Socio-Economic Review.

== Education ==
Rueda was born in Seville, Spain and grew up in nearby San Fernando, Cádiz. He completed his high school education at the United World College of the American West in New Mexico, earning an International Baccalaureate Diploma in 1989. He received his BA in economics in 1993 from Franklin & Marshall College, Pennsylvania, and subsequently studied at the School of Oriental and African Studies, University of London, where he earned an MSc in politics of Asia and Africa in 1994. He received his MA (1998) and PhD (2001) from Cornell University.

== Career ==
He was an assistant professor in the Department of Political Science at Binghamton University from 2001 till 2004. From 2004 to 2006 he worked as a university lecturer in quantitative political science, Department of Politics and International Relations at Oxford University. He later became a Professor of Comparative Politics in the Department of Politics and International Relations, and worked in this position from 2006 till 2013. In 2013 he became a Professor of Comparative Politics, Department of Politics and International Relations, and professorial fellow, at Oxford's Nuffield College.

== Awards ==
He received a Social Science Korea research award for “Inequality and Democracy” (2014-2017), and British Academy Research Development Award for “The Political Consequences of Inequality” (2008-2010).

== Selected publications ==
=== Books ===
- Rueda, David (2007). Social democracy inside out: partisanship and labor market policy in industrialized democracies. Oxford New York: Oxford University Press. ISBN 9780199216352.

=== Book chapters ===
- Rueda, David (2012), "West European welfare states in times of crisis", in Bermeo, Nancy; Pontusson, Jonas (eds.), Coping with crisis: government reactions to the great recession, New York: Russell Sage Foundation, pp. 361–398, ISBN 9780871540768.
- Rueda, David; Wibbels, Erik; Altamirano, Melina (2015), "The origins of dualism", in Beramendi, Pablo; Häusermann, Silja; Kitschelt, Herbert; Kriesi, Hanspeter (eds.), The politics of advanced capitalism, New York: Cambridge University Press, pp. 89–111, ISBN 9781107492622.

=== Journal articles ===
- Rueda, David; Beramendi, Pablo (2014). "Inequality and institutions: the case of economic coordination". Annual Review of Political Science. 17. Cambridge Journals: 251–271. doi:10.1146/annurev-polisci-032211-210535.
- Rueda, David; Lindvall, Johannes (April 2014). "The insider-outsider dilemma". British Journal of Political Science. 44 (2). Cambridge Journals: 460–475. doi:10.1017/S0007123412000804. S2CID 154374270.
- Rueda, David (April 2014). "Dualization, crisis and the welfare state". Socio-Economic Review. 12 (2). Oxford Journals: 381–407. doi:10.1093/ser/mwu015.
- Rueda, David (April 2015). "The state of the welfare state: unemployment, labor market policy, and inequality in the age of workfare". Comparative Politics. 47 (3). CUNY via Ingentaconnect: 296–314. doi:10.5129/001041515814709275. Pdf.
