= Wolf Lepenies =

German sociologist

- Born: 11 January 1941 (age 85); Allenstein, East Prussia
- Awards: Friedenspreis des Deutschen Buchhandels

Academic background
- Education: University of Münster; Free University of Berlin

Academic work
- Discipline: sociology political science
- Institutions: Wissenschaftskolleg; Free University of Berlin

Wolf Lepenies (born 11 January 1941) is a German sociologist, political scientist, and author.

== Biography ==
Lepenies was born near Allenstein, East Prussia (now Olsztyn, Poland). In 1945 his family fled from the Soviet Army's assault on East Prussia to Schleswig-Holstein and from there to North Rhine-Westphalia. He eventually grew up in Koblenz. He studied sociology and philosophy at the University of Münster in North Rhine-Westphalia and graduated with a promotion in 1967. In 1970 he habilitated at the Free University of Berlin. He traveled abroad, first to the Maison des sciences de l'homme in Paris, then to the Institute for Advanced Study in Princeton. In 1984 he joined the faculty of the Wissenschaftskolleg in Berlin before becoming a professor of sociology at the Free University of Berlin. He frequently returned to Princeton to conduct research. In 1986 he succeeded Peter Wapnewski as president of the Wissenschaftskolleg. In 2001 he was succeeded by Dieter Grimm. In 2006 he became a professor emeritus.

Lepenies is a member of the Royal Swedish Academy of Sciences.

Since 2004 he has been a member of the supervisory board of Axel Springer AG.

== Selected awards and honors ==
- 1984 - Gay-Lussac-Humboldt-Prize
- 1986 - Kulturpreis der Stadt Koblenz
- 1988 - Karl-Vossler-Preis
- 1998 - Leibniz Ring Hannover
- 1999 - Joseph Breitbach Prize
- 2000 - Theodor Heuss Prize
- 2003 - Leibniz Medal from the Berlin-Brandenburg Academy of Sciences
- 2003 - Prix Chartier, for Sainte-Beuve, au seuil de la modernité
- 2004 - Legion of Honour
- 2006 - Friedenspreis des Deutschen Buchhandels (awarded by Andrei Plesu)
- 2007 - Staatspreis des Landes Nordrhein-Westfalen
- 2010 - Schader Award
- 2015 - Adam-Mickiewicz-Preis
- 2016 - Kythera Prize
- 2017 - Order of the Star of Romania, Commander

== Works ==
- Melancholie und Gesellschaft, 1969 (his 1967 doctoral dissertation)
- Orte des wilden Denkens. Zur Anthropologie von Claude Levi-Strauss (with Hans Henning Ritter), 1970
- Soziologische Anthropologie. Materialien, 1971
- Das Ende der Naturgeschichte. Wandel kultureller Selbstverständlichkeiten, 1976
- Geschichte der Soziologie (a history of sociology in four volumes), 1981
- Die drei Kulturen. Soziologie zwischen Literatur und Wissenschaft, 1985
- Autoren und Wissenschaftler im 18. Jahrhundert. Linné - Buffon - Winckelmann - Georg Forster - Erasmus Darwin, 1988
- Gefährliche Wahlverwandtschaften. Essays zur Wissenschaftsgeschichte, 1989
- Folgen einer unerhörten Begebenheit. Die Deutschen nach der Vereinigung, 1992
- Aufstieg und Fall der Intellektuellen in Europa, 1992
- Sainte-Beuve. Auf der Schwelle zur Moderne, 1997
- Benimm und Erkenntnis, 1997
- Sozialwissenschaft und sozialer Wandel. Ein Erfahrungsbericht, 1999
- Kultur und Politik. Deutsche Geschichten, 2006
- The Seduction of Culture in German History, 2006
