= Joint decision trap =

Political science concept

The joint decision trap was identified by the political scientist, Fritz W. Scharpf in a 1988 scholarly article, Scharpf, Fritz W. (1988). The Joint-Decision Trap. Lessons From German Federalism and European Integration. Public Administration, Vol. 66, No. 2. pp. 239–78. It is understood to be a situation in which there is a tendency for government decisions to be taken at the lowest common denominator in situations where the decision-makers have the ability to veto the proposals. It is a common challenge for federal governments such as Germany and the European Union.

== See also ==
- Anticipatory thinking
