= Thomas Kaminsky (artist) =

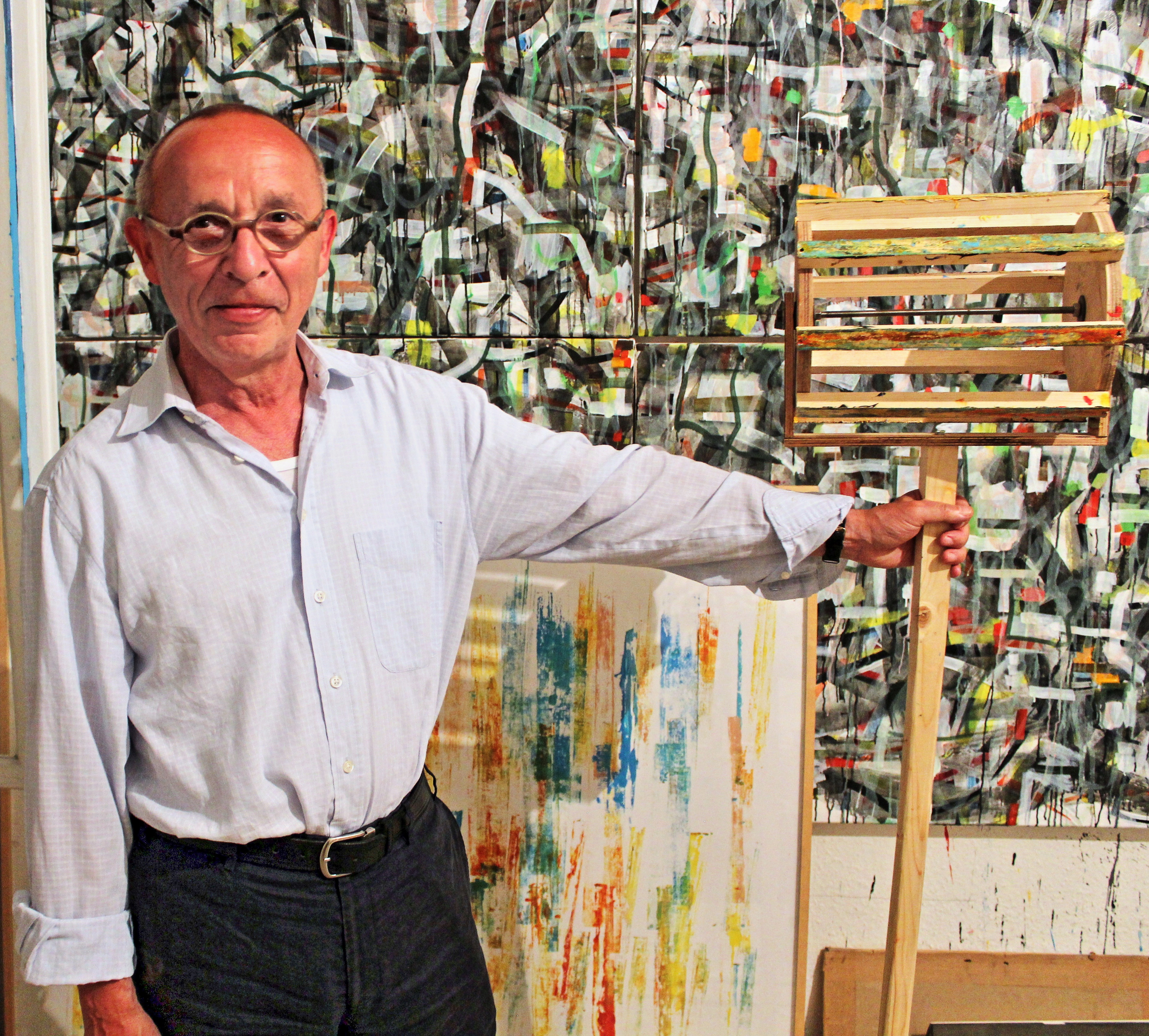
- Thomas Kaminsky (2014)
- Born: 1945 (age 80–81)
- Occupation: Artist

Thomas Kaminsky (born 1945) is a German artist, painter and printmaker living and working in Cologne and Vienna. Born in Dresden, in 1964 he escaped to West Berlin and soon after became a student of the Informel painter and graphic artist Hann Trier (1915–99) at Berlin University's Fine Art Academy. In 1977 he was among the first to receive the Schmidt-Rottluff award. This was followed in 1981–82 by a Villa Massimo Rome fellowship, one of the most important distinctions for a young German artist. In 1998 there were retrospectives of his woodcuts in Kassel, Wuppertal and 'Between Concrete and Utopia' at Kunstmuseum Villa Zanders in Bergisch Gladbach. Kaminsky was subsequently commissioned to make artworks for the residence of the German ambassador in Beijing.

Many of his works concern the period before and after the Russian Revolution (1917). They explore the possibility of a utopia in which cultural production was allowed to flourish, before the struggles and the tensions of the Soviet era and the Cold War emerged in Russia and its satellite states behind the Iron Curtain. The influence of European Abstract Expressionism circa 1950 permeates his approach as it does the work of German contemporaries Anselm Kiefer and Georg Baselitz. Kaminsky's works, particularly in his large-scale woodcuts, are populated with symbolic motifs and characters which include Kazimir Malevich's paintings, the revolutionary leader Vladimir Lenin and the artist himself as a child holding a toy windmill (a surrogate signature).

Kaminsky's work is exhibited regularly in Germany and further afield, and can be found in major group exhibitions and museum collections including the contemporary art collection of the Federal Republic of Germany, the Neuer Berliner Kunstverein/ and others.
