= Alexander B. Hicks =

American educator and politician

Alexander B. Hicks Jr. (died January 1883) was a state legislator in North Carolina. He represented Washington County in the North Carolina House of Representatives in 1881.

He was from Plymouth, North Carolina, studied at Shaw University, and established a school in Plymouth that developed into a state normal school.

His election was reported as the "largest majority ever polled" to the county's political offices even though Hicks only won by 9 votes more than the nearest of his four competitors. He was 25 years old, Republican, and African American. Hicks was a school principal when elected, one of two newly elected African American school principals that session, the other was George Henry White.

In 1882 Hicks resigned his seat to take up a position of County Commissioner for Washington County. He died in January 1883.

== See also ==
- Peter Weddick Moore
