= Hann Trier =

German artist

Hann Trier (1 August 1915 in Düsseldorf – 14 June 1999 in Castiglione della Pescaia in Tuscany) was a German artist, best known for his giant ceiling painting in the Charlottenburg Palace. He was married to the sociologist Renate Mayntz and was the elder brother of an art historian Eduard Trier.

== Life and work ==
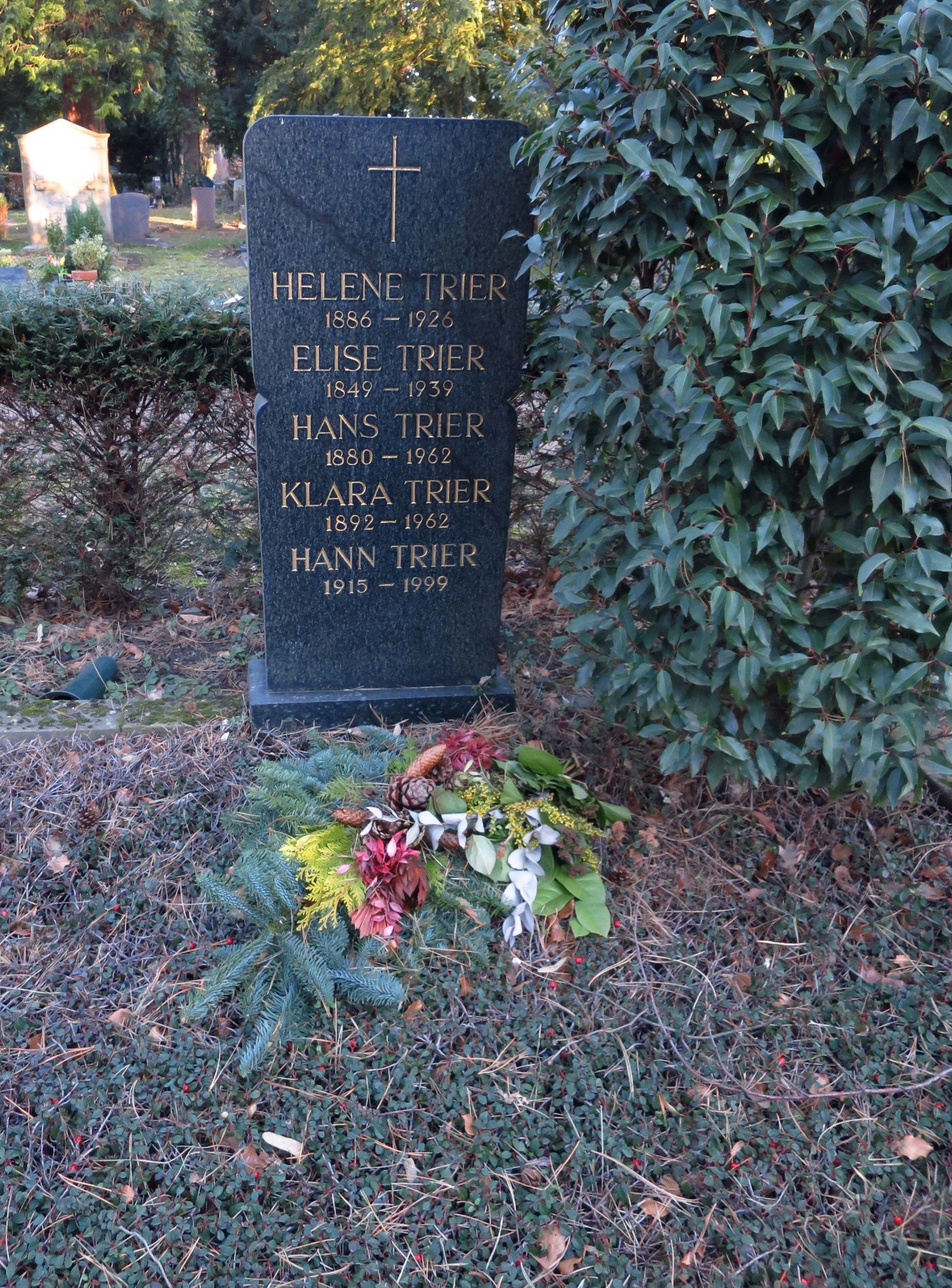
Trier family grave in Nordfriedhof (Cologne)

Trier spent his youth in Cologne. From 1934 until 1938, he studied at the Kunstakademie Düsseldorf. During the Second World War he served in the Wehrmacht, from 1941 until 1944 as a technical artist in Berlin.

At the end of the war he returned to painting, setting up his studio in Bornheim, not far from Bonn. In 1947, he, with other artists including Joseph Beuys, was a founder member of the group 'Donnerstag-Gesellschaft' ('Thursday Group'). The Group organised discussions, exhibitions, events and concerts between 1947 and 1950 in Alfter Castle. In 1950 he won the prestigious Blevins Davis Prize in Munich.

From 1952 to 1955 he worked in Medellín in Colombia, subsequently studying in Mexico and New York. In 1955 he was appointed as a guest lecturer at the Hamburg Academy of Fine Art. From 1955 he exhibited in the first, second and third Documenta exhibitions in Kassel.

From 1957 until 1980 he was professor and later Director of the Berlin University of the Arts. In 1967 he began the monumental task of replacing the war-damaged ceiling paintings at the Charlottenburg Palace, completing the first section in 1972, and finishing a further ceiling between 1972 and 1974. He was awarded the 1966 Berliner Kunstpreis (Berlin Art Prize) and the Grand Cross of Merit of the German Republic in 1975.

His auction record is €48,000 for his 1964 oil on canvas Nymphe Echo, sold at the Villa Grisebach auction house in Berlin on 4 June 2015.

== Exhibitions ==
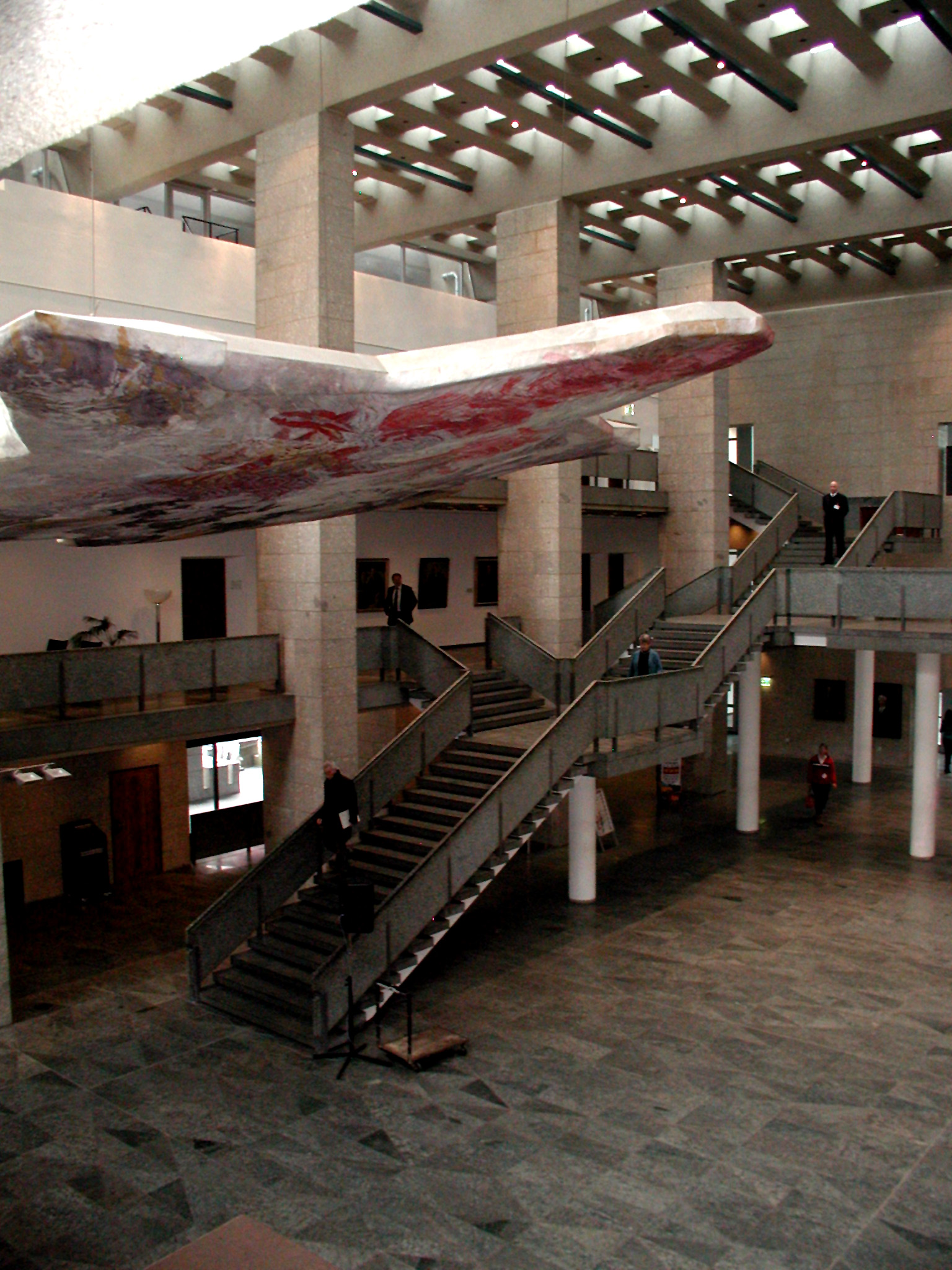
"Schwebender Baldachin“ by Hann Trier in the Cologne town hall

- documenta 1 1955 in Kassel
- documenta 2 1959 in Kassel
- documenta 3 1964 in Kassel
- Hann Trier (1915–1999). Between Old and New Masters. Staatliche Kunstsammlungen Dresden, Albertinum, 2003.
- Hann Trier: Pictures from 1948 to 1998. Abdinghof Gallery, Paderborn, 2006.

== Illustrations ==
- Werner Hörnemann: Ali und die Räuber. Herder, Freiburg 1953

== Writing ==
- Hann Trier: Über die Rückseite des Mondes. Broecking Verlag, Berlin 2009, ISBN 978-3-938763-06-3.
- Hann Trier: Ut poesis pictura? : Eine Betrachtung zur Malerei der griechischen Antike. Edition Rothe, Heidelberg 1985, ISBN 3-920651-06-5. (Mit Vorzugsausgaben).
- Hann Trier: Kunst zwischen Bismarckismus und konstrakt. In: Bonn - Jahre des Aufbruchs. General-Anzeiger, Bonn 1986.
- Michael Euler-Schmidt: Hann Trier: Monographie und Werkverzeichnis der Gemalde. 2 Volumes, Wienand, Cologne, 1990-95. ISBN 3879094144
- Uta Gerlach-Laxner: Hann Trier: Werkverzeichnis der Druckgraphik. Cologne, 1994. ISBN 3879093563
- Sabine Fehlemann & Uta Gerlach-Laxner: Hann Trier, Monographie und Werkverzeichnis, Wienand, Cologne, 1990. ISBN 3879092192
