= Jens Beckert =

German sociologist (born 1967)

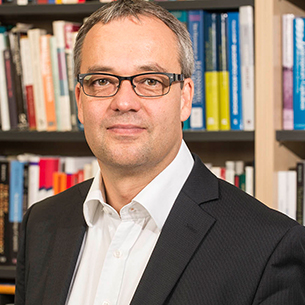
Jens Beckert

Jens Beckert (born 21 July 1967, in Frankfurt am Main) is a German sociologist with a strong interest in economic sociology. The author of books on inherited wealth and the social foundations of economic efficiency and imagined futures in the economy, he focuses on the role of the economy in society – especially based on studies of markets – as well as organizational sociology, the sociology of inheritance, and sociological theory. He is director at the Max Planck Institute for the Study of Societies (MPIfG) in Cologne, Germany, and a member of the Berlin-Brandenburg Academy of Sciences and Humanities.

== Education and career ==
Beckert earned his MA in sociology at the New School for Social Research in New York City in 1991 and his MBA at Free University of Berlin in 1993. He earned his doctorate with a dissertation in the field of economic sociology in 1996 at Free University of Berlin and his habilitation at the same university with a book on the sociology of inheritance in 2003.

An associate professorship in sociology at International University Bremen (2002–2003) and a professorship in sociology at the University of Göttingen (2003–2005) preceded Beckert’s appointment at age 37 as director at the Max Planck Institute for the Study of Societies (MPIfG), which conducts basic research on the governance of modern societies. Beckert has had visiting fellowships at Princeton University, Harvard University, the European University Institute in Florence, the Center for the Sociology of Organizations (CSO) in Paris, and the Paris Institute for Advanced Study. He gave a Mario Einaudi Lecture at the Center for International Studies at Cornell University in 2007. In 2019-20 he was Theodor Heuß Professor at the New School for Social Research in New York.

== Current position and activities ==
He is director at the Max Planck Institute for the Study of Societies (MPIfG) in Cologne. In addition, Beckert is a member of the Faculty of Management, Economics and Social Sciences at the University of Cologne. He is a faculty member of the International Max Planck Research School on the Social and Political Constitution of the Economy, a doctoral program run jointly by the MPIfG and the Faculty of Management at the University of Cologne. Beckert is an editor of the European Journal of Sociology and a member of the editorial board of Socio-Economic Review. He was council member of the Economic Sociology Section of the American Sociological Association (ASA).

== Research ==
=== Economies as social orders within societies ===
Jens Beckert’s current work at the Max Planck Institute for the Study of Societies reflects a research program he has developed with his former codirector Wolfgang Streeck which “proposes to invest in a theory of social action as the most promising approach to a deeper understanding and an improved theorization of the economy as a socially and politically constituted system of action.”

“Any economy is socially and politically constructed. The way it is socially embedded reflects both prevailing systems of meaning and the results of political ‘market struggles’ over social regulation. Investigating institutional regulation of the economy requires studying how economies are constituted as social orders within societies.”

=== Markets from a sociological perspective ===
In his research cluster on the “Sociology of Markets,” Beckert focuses on “markets as the core institution of capitalist economies,” seeking “to understand the functioning of markets from a distinctively sociological perspective.” Analyzing markets “from a Weberian viewpoint as arenas of social struggle in which actors confront each other under conditions of competition,” he explores the “social, cultural, and political underpinnings for the development of the order of markets.”

=== Embeddedness of economic action ===
“The problem of uncertainty market actors face when making decisions” is a key issue in Beckert’s research, which examines “the coordination problems market participants must cope with” – the problems of value, competition, and cooperation. “Uncertainty also provides a theoretical opening to explain the embeddedness of economic action.”

== Awards and honours ==
- 2021: Appointed to the Academia Europaea
- 2018: "Gottfried Wilhelm Leibniz"-Prize of the German Research Foundation (DFG)
- 2010: Appointed to the Berlin-Brandenburg Academy of Sciences and Humanities
- 2005: Best Law Book of the Year, by the German law journal Neue Juristische Wochenschrift, his book Unverdientes Vermögen [Unearned Wealth]
- 2005: Prize of the Berlin-Brandenburg Academy of Sciences and Humanities donated by the Commerzbank Foundation. In its tribute, the Academy states that Jens Beckert is “one of the most original and productive sociologists of his generation, both nationally and internationally. He is considered a leading proponent of a new economic sociology [...].”

== Selected publications ==
=== Books ===
- How We Sold Our Future: The Failure to Fight Climate Change. Cambridge: Polity, 2025 (translated by Ray Cunningham), ISBN 9781509565092.
- Uncertain Futures: Imaginaries, Narratives, and Calculation in the Economy. Oxford University Press, 2018 (ed. with Richard Bronk), ISBN 9780198820802.
- Imagined Futures: Fictional Expectations and Capitalist Dynamics. Cambridge, MA: Harvard University Press 2016.
- Constructing Quality: The Classification of Goods in Markets. Oxford: Oxford University Press 2013 (ed. with Christine Musselin).
- The Worth of Goods: Valuation and Pricing in the Economy. New York: Oxford University Press 2011 (ed. with Patrick Aspers).
- Inherited Wealth. Princeton: Princeton University Press 2008. (German edition: Unverdientes Vermögen: Soziologie des Erbrechts. Frankfurt a.M.: Campus, 2004).
- Beyond the Market: The Social Foundations of Economic Efficiency. Princeton: Princeton University Press 2002. (German edition: Grenzen des Marktes. Frankfurt a.M.: Campus 1997).

=== Articles ===
- Beckert, Jens (2023). "Varieties of Wealth: Toward a Comparative Sociology of Wealth Inequality". Socio-Economic Review.
- Beckert, Jens (2022). "Durable Wealth: Institutions, Mechanisms, and Practices of Wealth Perpetuation". Annual Review of Sociology, 48: 233–255.
- Beckert, Jens (2021). "The Firm as an Engine of Imagination: Organizational Prospection and the Making of Economic Futures". Organization Theory, 2 (2).
- Beckert, Jens (2020). "Markets from Meaning: Quality Uncertainty and the Intersubjective Construction of Value". Cambridge Journal of Economics, 44 (2): 285–301.
- Beckert, Jens (2013). "Imagined futures: fictional expectations in the economy". Theory and Society. 42 (3): 219–240. doi:10.1007/s11186-013-9191-2. hdl:11858/00-001M-0000-000E-EF70-7. ISSN 0304-2421. S2CID 55657162.
- Beckert, Jens (2010). "Institutional Isomorphism Revisited: Convergence and Divergence in Institutional Change". Sociological Theory. 28 (2): 150–166. doi:10.1111/j.1467-9558.2010.01369.x. hdl:11858/00-001M-0000-0012-4219-5. ISSN 0735-2751. S2CID 32889286.
- Beckert, Jens (2010). "How Do Fields Change? The Interrelations of Institutions, Networks, and Cognition in the Dynamics of Markets". Organization Studies. 31 (5): 605–627. doi:10.1177/0170840610372184. hdl:11858/00-001M-0000-0012-41FC-F. ISSN 0170-8406. S2CID 145148295.
- Beckert, Jens (2009). "The social order of markets". Theory and Society. 38 (3): 245–269. doi:10.1007/s11186-008-9082-0. hdl:11858/00-001M-0000-0012-43EA-7. ISSN 0304-2421.
- Beckert, Jens (2016). "Agency, Entrepreneurs, and Institutional Change. The Role of Strategic Choice and Institutionalized Practices in Organizations". Organization Studies. 20 (5): 777–799. doi:10.1177/0170840699205004. ISSN 0170-8406. S2CID 145494629.
- Beckert, Jens (1996). "What is sociological about economic sociology? Uncertainty and the embeddedness of economic action". Theory and Society. 25 (6): 803–840. doi:10.1007/BF00159817. ISSN 0304-2421. S2CID 144369748.
