= Andrea Montanino =

Italian economist

- Born: June 28, 1968 (age 58)
- Education: Sapienza University of Rome, London School of Economics
- Occupations: Economist, Business Executive
- Known for: Chief Economist & Sector Strategy and Impact Director of Cassa Depositi e Prestiti
- Notable work: Chairman of the Board of Istituto Italiano di Tecnologia, Former Executive Director of the IMF
- Awards: Cavaliere dell'Ordine al Merito della Repubblica Italiana

Andrea Montanino (born June 28, 1968) is an Italian economist and business executive. He currently serves as Chief Economist and Director for Sectoral Strategies and Impact Assessment at Cassa Depositi e Prestiti (CDP), Italy’s national promotional institution. He is also Chairman of the Board of the Istituto Italiano di Tecnologia (IIT).

He has formerly held the positions of Executive Director of the International Monetary Fund (IMF), representing the governments of Italy, Albania, Greece, Malta, Portugal, and San Marino, Director General at the Italian Treasury, and Chairman of the private equity Fondo Italiano di Investimento.

== Early life and education ==
Montanino earned a Bachelor’s degree in Economics from the Sapienza University of Rome in 1992. He later obtained a Master’s degree from the London School of Economics in 1995, followed by a Ph.D. in Political Economy from Sapienza University in 1997.

== Career ==
Montanino served in several Italian and international institutions. In Italy he has been senior economist at the Prime Minister’s Office, economic advisor and head of technical secretariat of Minister Tommaso Padoa-Schioppa (2006-2008, Director General at the Ministry of Economy and Finance in the Department of Treasury, appointed by Minister Giulio Tremonti (2008-2012). He also served as Chief Economist of Confindustria, the Italian Employers’ Association (2017-2019).

In Brussels, he worked at the European Commission’s Directorate-General for Economic and Financial Affairs (2001-2005), where he contributed to the reform of EU budgetary rules and conducted long-term sustainability analysis of member states.

From 2012 to 2014, Montanino was appointed Executive Director and Board Member at the International Monetary Fund (IMF) in Washington, D.C., representing Italy, Albania, Greece, Malta, Portugal, and San Marino.

In 2014 he joined the Atlantic Council, a non-partisan American think tank based in Washington D.C. in the field of international affairs favoring Atlanticism, to lead the Global Business and Economics Program. He was also named C. Boyden Gray Fellow on Global Growth where he served until 2017 before returning to Italy.

== Other roles ==
- Chairman, Fondo Italiano d’Investimento (2019–2021)
- Vice Chairman, MedioCredito Centrale (2011–2012)
- Board Member, Sogei (2009–2011), Fondo Italiano d’Investimento (2010-2013), F2i – Fondi Italiani per le Infrastrutture (2010-2013).

== Academic activity and publications ==
Montanino is Professor of Practice in Geoeconomics at Luiss University in Rome.

He has been a columnist for La Stampa and currently his op-eds appear on Corriere della Sera – L’Economia. He has been interviewed by major news media such as BBC, CNN, Fox News, Financial Times.

Currently he is Member of the Scientific Committees of: Fondazione "Tor Vergata", Scuola di Politiche, SPES Academy, Rivista "Economia Italiana". He is fellow of the Luiss Institute for European Analysis and Policy.

Selected Publications

1. “Dal Debito Pubblico al Capitale Privato: Verso una Nuova Politica Economica”, in Private Equity e Intervento Pubblico (a cura di S. Caselli e F.L. Sattin), Egea, 2011.

2. “The role of public policy in worker training in Italy” (with G. Croce), European Journal of Vocational Training, 2007.

3. “The EU Approach to Fiscal Sustainability” (with S. Deroose and I. Wold), in Fiscal Policy and the Road to the Euro, Varsavia, 2006.

4. “Measuring the Quality of Public Expenditures”, in Les Finances Publiques: Defis a Moyen et Long Termes, papers and proceedings of the 16th Congress of the Belgian Economists, Mons, 2005.

5. “EU Fiscal Surveillance and the Increasing Focus Towards the Long-term”, Revista Presupuesto y Gasto Publico, Madrid, 2004.

6. ”Expenditure on Education: the Implications for Economic Growth and Public Finances” (with B. Przywara and D. Young), Economic Papers, n.217, European Commission, Brussels, 2004.

7. “Il Patto di Stabilità e Crescita” (with G. Giudice), Rivista di Politica Economica, SIPI, Roma, 2003.

8. « Un Pacte Pour la Stabilité et la Croissance Economique en Europe », (con G. Giudice), Revue du Marchè Commune et de l’Union Européenne, Paris, 2002.

9. “Le Molte Funzioni del Lavoro Interinale in Italia: da Strumento di Flessibilità a Contratto di Prova”, (with P. Sestito), Rivista di Politica Economica, SIPI, Roma, 2003.

10. “Formazione aziendale, struttura dell’occupazione e dimensione dell’impresa”, Rivista di Politica Economica, SIPI, Roma, 2002.

== Honors ==
- Best in Class 2014, by the Alumni of the Faculty of Economics, La Sapienza University of Rome
- Commendatore Ordine al Merito della Repubblica Italiana (2025)
