= Desmond King (professor) =

Irish-American professor on government (born 1957)

Desmond King FBA
- Born: 1957 (age 68–69); Dublin, Ireland

Academic background
- Education: Trinity College Dublin (BA); Northwestern University (MA, PhD)

Academic work
- Institutions: University of Oxford
- Doctoral students: Ronan Farrow
- Main interests: American government
- Notable works: Making Americans, In the Name of Liberalism

Desmond King FBA FRHistS (born 1957) is the Andrew W. Mellon professor of American Government at Nuffield College, Oxford. King was elected to the American Philosophical Society in 2022. He was elected a Member of the National Academy of Sciences in 2025.

== Biography ==
King grew up in Dublin and graduated from Trinity College Dublin with a first in political science and was awarded the Bastable Prize. He went on to carry out his postgraduate studies at Northwestern University, where he worked with Ted Robert Gurr, Alexander Hicks and Jane Mansbridge. He completed his M.A. and PhD at Northwestern, and was appointed as a lecturer at the University of Edinburgh, later moving to an Official Fellowship in Politics at St John's College, Oxford.

King was awarded his DLitt from the University of Oxford. He is an elected fellow of the British Academy and the American Academy of Arts and Sciences and several other national academies including the Academia Europaea, the Royal Irish Academy, the Royal Historical Society, the Royal Society of Arts and the Academy of Social Sciences. He is an Emeritus Fellow of St John's College, Oxford.

== Selected publications ==
=== Books ===
Separate and Unequal: African Americans and the US Federal Government, Clarendon Press, 1995. (revised edition published 2007) ISBN 9780198280163

Actively Seeking Work?: The Politics of Unemployment and Welfare Policy in the United States and Great Britain, University of Chicago Press, 1995. ISBN 9780226436227

In the Name of Liberalism: Illiberal Social Policy in the USA and Britain, Oxford University Press, 1999. ISBN 9780198296096

Making Americans: Immigration, Race and the Origins of the Diverse Democracy, Harvard University Press, 2000. ISBN 9780674000889

The Liberty of Strangers: Making the American Nation, Oxford University Press, 2005. ISBN 9780195306439

Still a House Divided: Race and Politics in Obama's America, Princeton University Press, 2011. (co-authored with Rogers Smith) ISBN 9781400839766

Sterilized by the State: Eugenics, Race, and the Population Scare in Twentieth-Century North America, Cambridge University Press, 2013. (co-authored with Randall Hansen) ISBN 9781107032927

Fed Power: How Finance Wins, Oxford University Press, 2016. (co-authored with Lawrence R. Jacobs; second edition published 2021) ISBN 9780197573129
