= Sebastian Conrad =

German historian

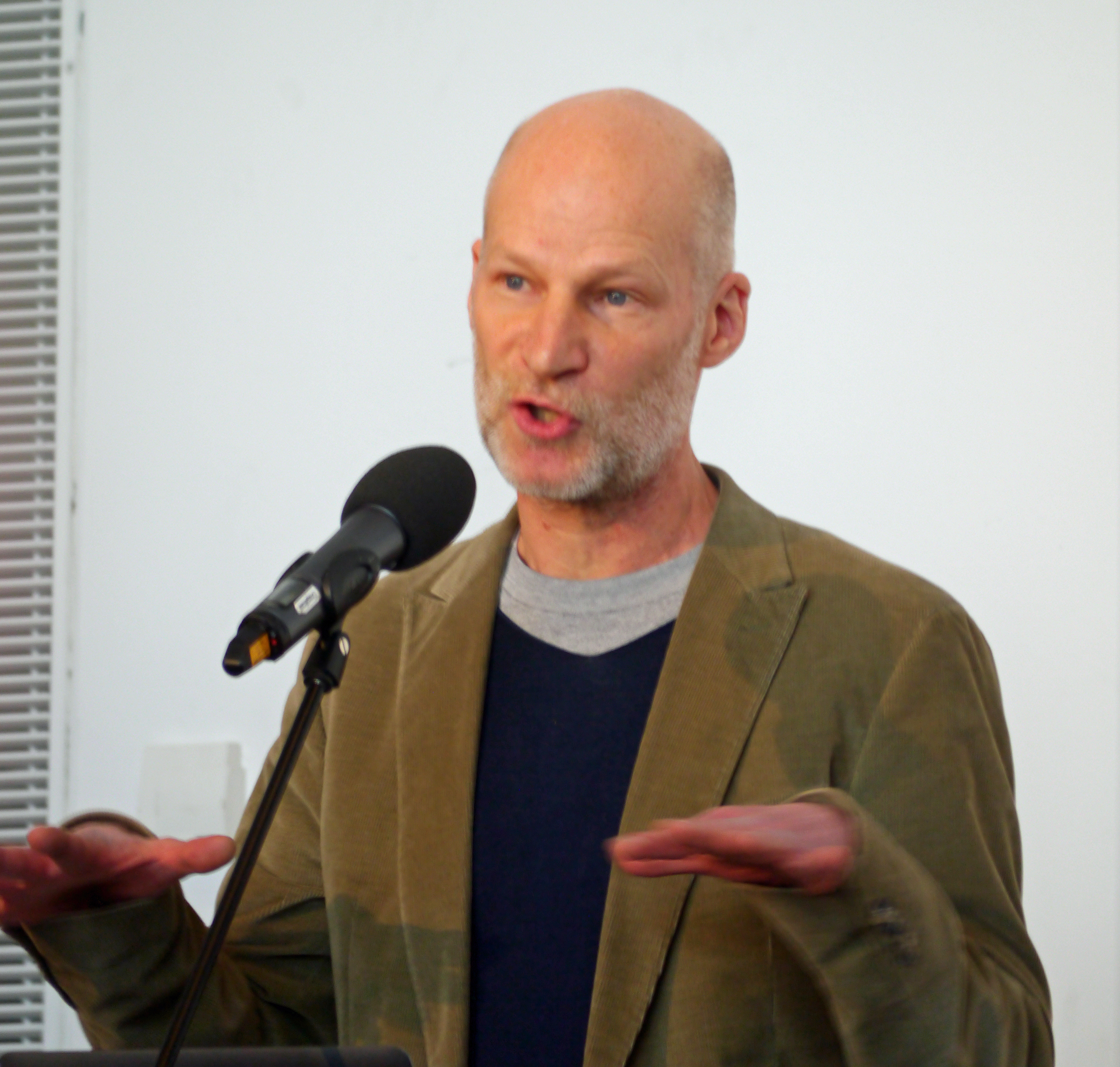
Sebastian Conrad in 2025

Sebastian Conrad (born 19 March 1966 in Heidelberg) is a German historian and professor of modern history at the Free University of Berlin, specializing in global and colonial history.

== Academic career ==
Conrad studied history, Japanese studies, and economics at the University of Bonn, Osaka University of Foreign Studies, and the Free University of Berlin. After a research stay at the University of Tokyo, he received his doctorate from the Free University of Berlin in 1999 with a comparative study on historiography in Japan and West Germany after the Second World War. His dissertation was awarded the Ernst Reuter Prize, and in the same year he was admitted to the Junge Akademie.

From 1999 to 2007, Conrad held academic positions at the Free University of Berlin, including a junior professorship. In 2007, he was appointed professor at the European University Institute in Florence. He returned to the Free University of Berlin in 2010 as professor of modern history.

Since 2012, he has directed the master's program "Global History", offered jointly by the Free University of Berlin and Humboldt University of Berlin. Conrad has held visiting positions at institutions including the École des hautes études en sciences sociales in Paris, the University of California, Santa Barbara, The New School in New York, the Wissenschaftskolleg zu Berlin, and the University of Tokyo.

In 2018, he was elected to the Berlin-Brandenburg Academy of Sciences and Humanities and to the Academia Europaea.

== Research ==
Conrad's research focuses on global history, colonial history, and the history of historiography. His first book, The Quest for the Lost Nation (1999; English edition 2010), is a comparative study of how historians in Germany and Japan rewrote national histories after the Second World War.

In subsequent publications, Conrad explored the relationship between globalization and national identity, particularly in Imperial Germany, arguing that nationalism and globalization were deeply intertwined rather than opposed. His work on German colonial history situates colonialism as a central component of German modernity and emphasizes its deep social, cultural, and intellectual entanglements.

With What Is Global History? (2016), Conrad provided a widely used introduction to the field, discussing its conceptual foundations, methodological approaches, and political implications. In A Cultural History of Global Transformation, Conrad applied global-historical perspectives to questions of cultural history.

His recent book The Queen: Nefertiti’s Global Career (2024) adopts a global-historical approach to the history of the Nefertiti Bust, examining how it became a global icon and was repeatedly reinterpreted in different historical and cultural contexts in relation to archaeology, colonialism, nationalism, and cultural identity, including debates over ownership, provenance, and cultural appropriation.

== Reception ==
Conrad's book What Is Global History? (2016) was widely received and has been described as a reference work. Serge Gruzinski characterized it as “both an excellent survey and a perceptive critique of our subfield,” praising its precise and balanced analysis. Pankaj Mishra wrote in BBC History Magazine that he “can’t think of a more useful guide” to the field. In a review for sehepunkte, Cyrus Schayegh described the book as “the new gold standard of its field,” calling it “sharp but balanced, comprehensive yet to the point.” Christopher Goscha referred to it as “a gem of a book,” noting that it explains global history “brilliantly” without losing readers in theoretical jargon. The book has been translated into fourteen languages.

== Selected works ==
=== Monographs ===
- Die Königin. Nofretetes globale Karriere (English title: The Queen: Nefertiti’s Global Career). Berlin: Propyläen, 2024. ISBN 978-3-549-10074-5.
- What Is Global History?. Princeton, NJ: Princeton University Press, 2016. ISBN 978-1-4008-8096-6.
- German Colonialism: A Short History. Cambridge: Cambridge University Press, 2012. ISBN 978-1-107-40047-4.
- Globalisation and the Nation in Imperial Germany. Cambridge: Cambridge University Press, 2010. ISBN 978-0-521-17730-6.
- The Quest for the Lost Nation: Writing History in Germany and Japan in the American Century. Berkeley: University of California Press, 2010. ISBN 978-0-520-25944-7.
- Verso il mondo moderno: Una storia culturale. Turin: Giulio Einaudi Editore, 2022. ISBN 978-88-06-25407-0.

=== Edited volumes ===
- (with Jürgen Osterhammel) Das Kaiserreich transnational. Deutschland in der Welt 1871–1914 Göttingen: Vandenhoeck & Ruprecht, 2004. ISBN 3-525-36733-3.
- (with Akira Iriye and Jürgen Osterhammel) An Emerging Modern World, 1750–1870. Cambridge, MA: Harvard University Press, 2018. ISBN 978-0-674-04720-4.
- (with Aleida Assmann) Memory in a Global Age: Discourses, Practices and Trajectories. London: Palgrave Macmillan, 2010. ISBN 978-0-230-27291-0.
- (with Dominic Sachsenmaier) Competing Visions of World Order: Global Moments and Movements, 1880s–1930s. New York: Palgrave Macmillan, 2007. ISBN 978-1-4039-7988-9.

=== Book chapters ===
- “A Cultural History of Global Transformation” In An Emerging Modern World, 1750–1870, edited by Sebastian Conrad, Jürgen Osterhammel and Akira Iriye, 433–708. Cambridge, MA: Harvard University Press, 2018.
