= Peter Lerche =

German jurist (1928–2016)

- Born: January 12, 1928; Leitmeritz, Sudetenland, Czechoslovakia
- Died: March 14, 2016 (aged 88)
- Education: LMU Munich
- Scientific career
- Fields: Constitutional law
- Workplaces: LMU Munich; Free University of Berlin
- Doctoral advisor: Theodor Maunz
- Doctoral students: Andreas Voßkuhle

Peter Lerche (January 12, 1928 – March 14, 2016) was a German jurist. Between 1964 and 1996, he held a chair for constitutional law at LMU Munich. His research interests also included media law.

Born in Leitmeritz, Sudetenland, Lerche studied law at LMU Munich, earning his habilitation in 1958 (thesis: Übermaß und Verfassungsrecht, "Exorbitance and constitutional law") under supervision of Theodor Maunz. He accepted a chair at the Free University of Berlin in 1961, before joining the faculty at LMU in 1964.
