= Max Planck Institute for the Study of Societies =

German social-science research institute

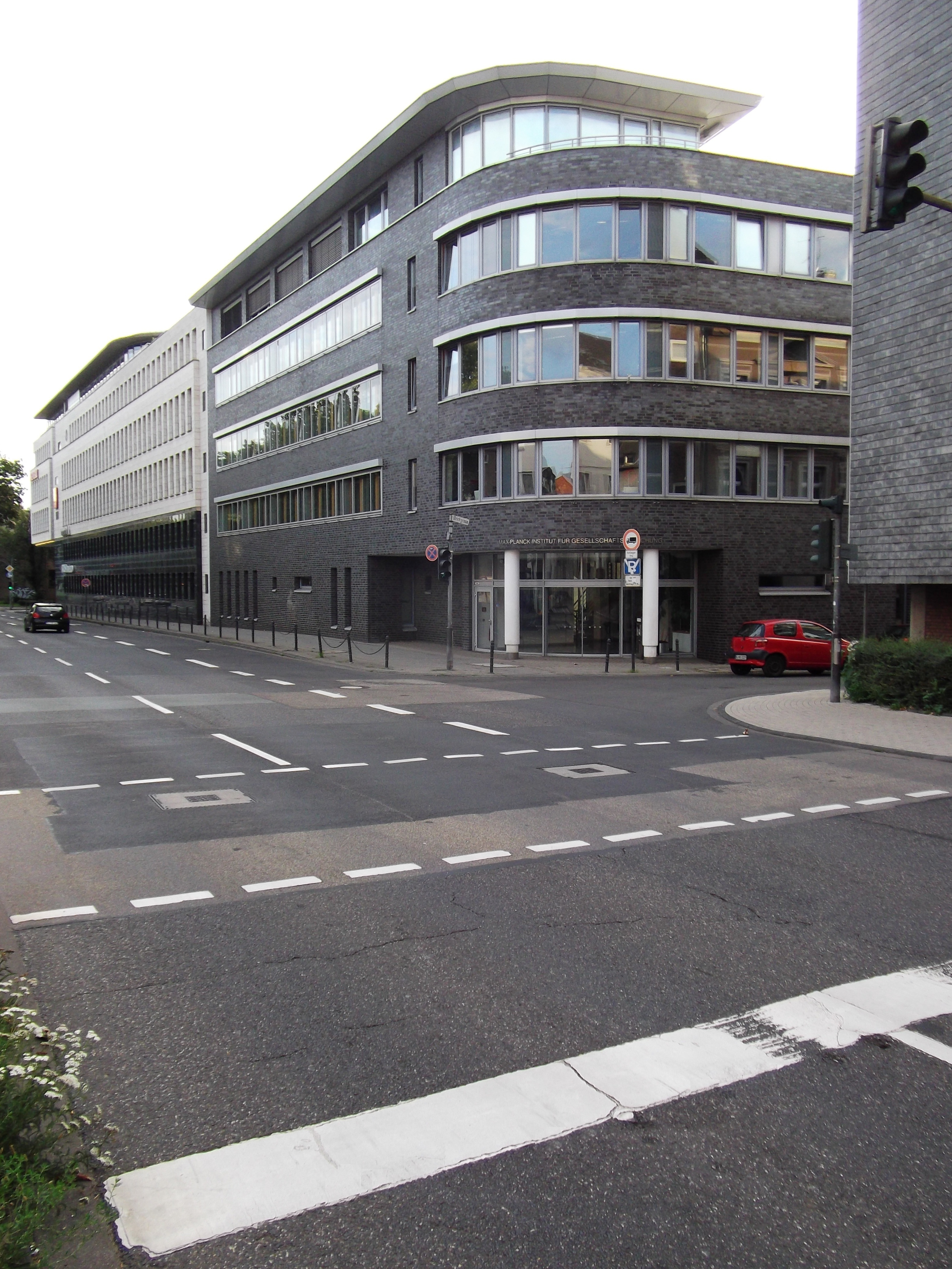
Max Planck Institute for the Study of Societies

The Max Planck Institute for the Study of Societies (German: Max-Planck-Institut für Gesellschaftsforschung, MPIfG) is a German social-science research institute within the Max Planck Society located in Cologne.

Established in 1985, it was initially headed by sociologist Renate Mayntz (1985/86), followed by political scientist Fritz W. Scharpf (1986–2003), both of whom exerted a profound influence on the institute's research and public image. The institute is currently directed by Lucio Baccaro and Jens Beckert with 31 employees and around 20 doctoral and post-doctoral fellows. The research group leaders are Martin Höpner and Leon Wansleben.

Wolfgang Streeck became director of the institute in 1995 and remained in this position until his retirement in 2014, becoming emeritus director.
