= Alexander Hicks (sociologist) =

American sociologist

Alexander M. Hicks (born 1946) is an American sociologist who principally studies the causes and consequences of social democracy, corporatism, the welfare state and the sociology of culture, literature and film.

== Education ==
Hicks was born in Jersey City, New Jersey in 1946 and attended public, parochial, and private primary and secondary schools in Weehawken, New Jersey, Rye, New York, Santiago, Chile, Manhattan, and Arlington County, Virginia. He graduated from McGill University with honors in sociology in 1969. He received a PhD in sociology from the University of Wisconsin-Madison, where he studied on fellowships from the National Science Foundation, the Ford Foundations and the National Institute of Mental Health, in 1979.

== Career ==
He is emeritus professor of sociology at Emory University, where he has been since 1986 (as chair of sociology 1988‑91, as full professor 1993–2017, as Winship Distinguished Research Professor of Sociology 2007–10) following an instructorship and assistant professorship at Northwestern Political Science Department and a postdoctoral fellowship at the NORC, University of Chicago.^{[1]}

Graduate students have included Desmond King (Nuffield College, Oxford), Joya Misra (University of Massachusetts, Amherst), 2023-2024 President of the American Sociological Association, Dan Slater (University of Michigan), Christina Steidl, Associate Dean, College of Arts, Humanities and Social Sciences, (University of Alabama, Huntsville) and Duane Swank (Marquette University).

During 2002-2006 was founding co-editor of the Socio-Economic Review. He has delivered invited talks at the Juan Bosch Institute in Madrid, the Max Planck Institute in Cologne, and at universities including the University of Chicago, Columbia, Indiana University, Taiwan's National Chung Cheng University, New York University, Stanford and Yale. [4]

== Major works ==
Hicks has over 6900 Google Scholar citations, including ones to the below publications.

=== Books ===
- Hicks, Alexander M. 1999. Social Democracy and Welfare Capitalism. Cornell University Press. ISBN 978-0801485565; ISBN 0801485568. Winner of the Luebbert Award for best book on comparative politics, Comparative Politics Section, American Political Science Association, 2000.

=== Edited volumes ===
- Janoski, Thomas and Alexander M. Hicks, eds. 1994. The Comparative Political Economy of the Welfare State: New Methodologies and Approaches. Cambridge University Press. ISBN 978-0521436021; ISBN 0521436028.
- Janoski, Thomas, Robert R. Alford, Alexander M. Hicks, and Mildred A. Schwartz, eds. 2004. The Handbook of Political Sociology. Cambridge University Press. ISBN 978-0521526203; ISBN 0521819903.
- Kenworthy, Lane and Alexander M. Hicks, eds. 2008. Method and Substance in Macro-Comparative Analysis. Palgrave. ISBN 978-0230202573; ISBN 0230202578.

=== Articles ===
- Hicks, Alexander M. and Duane H. Swank. 1984. "Governmental Redistribution in Rich Capitalist Democracies." Policy Studies Journal. doi:10.1111/j.1541-0072.1984.tb00339.x.
- Hicks, Alexander M. and Duane H. Swank. 1984. "On the Political Economy of Welfare Expansion: A Comparative Analysis of 18 Advanced Capitalist Democracies, 1960-1971." Comparative Political Studies. doi:10.1177/0010414084017001003.
- Hicks, Alexander M. 1988. "Social Democratic Corporatism and Economic Growth." Journal of Politics. doi:10.2307/2131463.
- Hicks, Alexander M. and Duane H. Swank. 1992. "Politics, Institutions, and Welfare Spending in Industrialized Democracies, 1960–82." American Political Science Review. doi:10.2307/196412.
- Hicks, Alexander M. and Joya Misra. 1993. "Political Resources and the Growth of Welfare in Affluent Capitalist Democracies, 1960-1982." American Journal of Sociology. doi:10.1086/230320.
- Hicks, Alexander M., Joya Misra, and Tang Nah Ng. 1995. "The Programmatic Emergence of the Social Security State." American Sociological Review. URL: JSTOR 2096417.
- Hicks, Alexander M. and Lane Kenworthy. 1998. "Cooperation and Political Economic Performance in Affluent Democratic Capitalism." American Journal of Sociology. doi:10.1086/231403.
- Hicks, Alexander M. and Lane Kenworthy. 2003. "Varieties of Welfare Capitalism." Socio-Economic Review. doi:10.1093/soceco/1.1.27.
- Hicks, Alexander M. 2006. “Free-Market and Religious Fundamentalists versus Poor Relief.” American Sociological Review. doi:10.1177/000312240607100309.
- Hicks, Alexander M. and Velina Petrova. 2006. "Auteur Discourse and the Cultural Consecration of American Films." Poetics. doi:10.1016/j.poetic.2006.01.001.
- Murdie, Amanda and Alexander M. Hicks. 2013. “Can International Nongovernmental Organizations Boost Government Services? The Case of Health.” International Organization. doi:10.1017/S0020818313000143.
- Li, Xue and Alexander M. Hicks. 2016. “World Polity Matters: Another Look at the Rise of the Nation-State across the World, 1816 to 2001." American Sociological Review. doi:10.1177/0003122416641371.
- Hicks, Alexander M. 2016. “A Lot of Balzac: Norman Mailer and the Early French Realists.” The Mailer Review. ISSN 1936-4679.
