= Fritz W. Scharpf =

German political scientist (born 1935)

Fritz Wilhelm Scharpf (born 12 February 1935 in Schwäbisch Hall) is German political scientist and Emeritus Director of the Max Planck Institute for the Study of Societies. His areas of interest include; the organisational problems and decision processes in governments at all levels; the political economy of inflation and unemployment; comparative political economy of the welfare state.

In 2000, Scharpf was awarded the Johan Skytte Prize in Political Science.

== Other awards ==
- 2008 Honorary doctorate of the European University Institute in Florence, Italy
- 2007 Science Prize of the Stifterverband
- 2007 Lifetime Contribution Award in EU Studies from the European Union Studies Association
- 2004 Bielefeld Science Award, (with Renate Mayntz)
- 2004 Great Cross of Merit of the Federal Republic of Germany
- 2003 Honorary Doctorate, Humboldt University Berlin

== Publications ==
Scharpf is an author of several books and his articles have appeared in numerous journals.

In a 1988 scholarly article, Scharpf, Fritz W. (1988). The Joint-Decision Trap. Lessons From German Federalism and European Integration. Public Administration, Vol. 66, No. 2. pp. 239–78., he identified a situation labelled joint decision trap, in which there is a tendency for government decisions to be taken at the lowest common denominator in situations where the decision-makers have the ability to veto the proposals. It is common challenge for federal governments, such as Germany, and the European Union.
