= Linguistic landscape =

Language on public signs

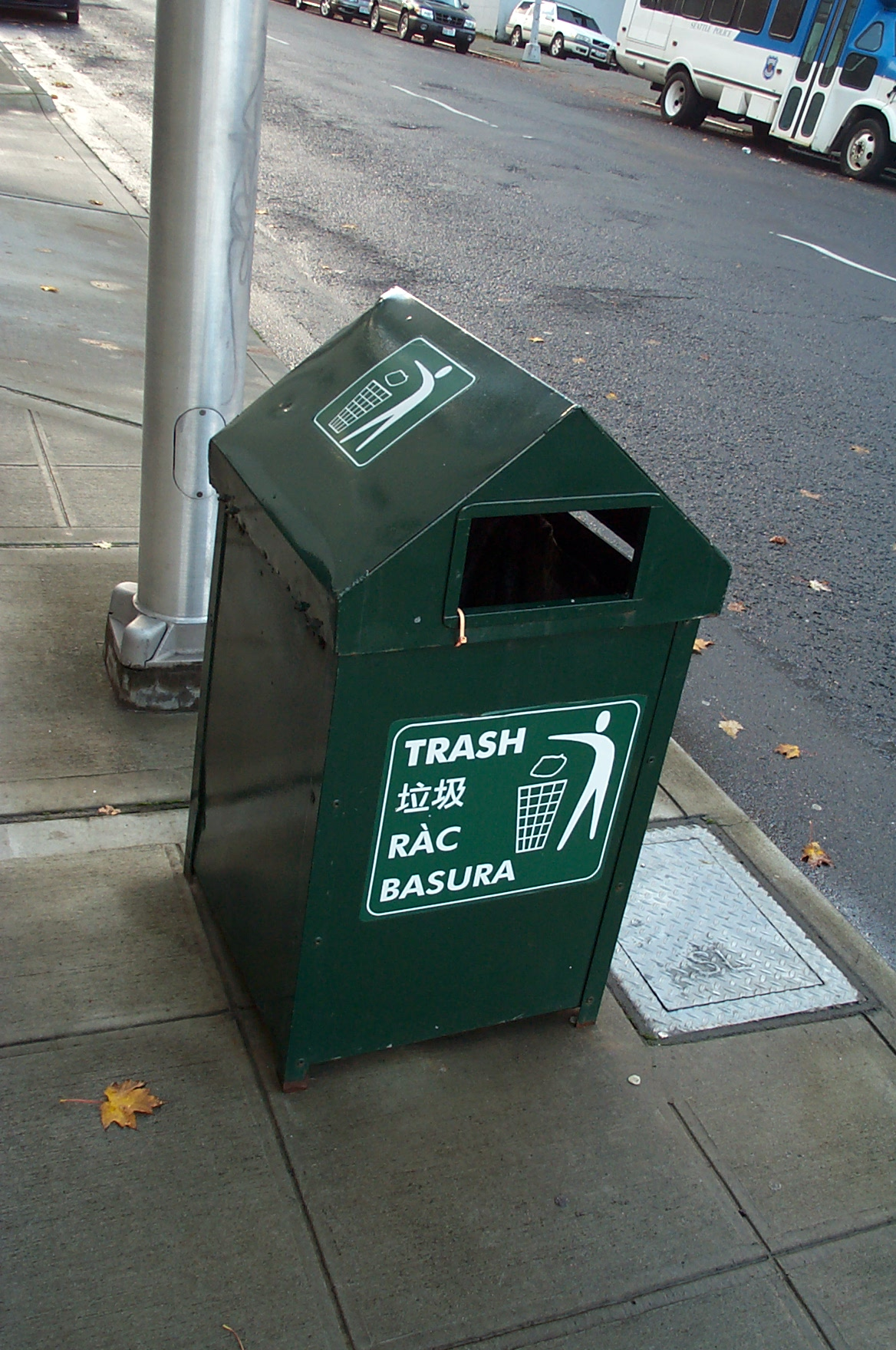
A trash can in Seattle labeled in four languages: American English, Chinese, Vietnamese, Spanish.

The linguistic landscape is the "visibility and salience of languages on public and commercial signs in a given territory or region". Linguistic landscape research has been described as being "somewhere at the junction of sociolinguistics, sociology, social psychology, geography, and media studies". It is a concept which originated in sociolinguistics and language policy as scholars studied how languages are visually displayed and hierarchised in multilingual societies, from large metropolitan centers to Amazonia. For example, linguistic landscape scholars have described how and why some public signs in Jerusalem are presented in Hebrew, English, and Arabic, or a combination thereof. It also looks at how communication in public space plays a crucial role in the organisation of society.

== Development of the field of study ==
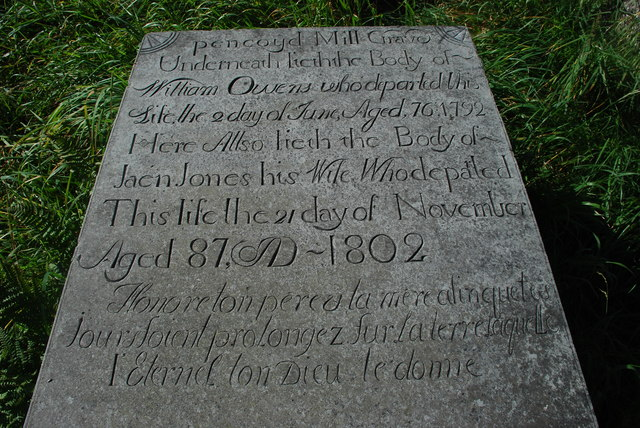
Multilingual gravestone: Welsh, English, French

Studies of the linguistic landscape have been published from research done around the world. The field of study is relatively recent; "the linguistic landscapes paradigm has evolved rapidly and while it has a number of key names associated with it, it currently has no clear orthodoxy or theoretical core". "In the 1970s and 1980s, there were some forerunners, but only after Landry and Bourhis (1997) presented their insightful reflections on the concept of linguistic landscape, some years later a group of researchers began to study language signs in their own right." A special issue of the International Journal of Multilingualism (3.1 in 2006) was devoted to the subject. Also, the journal World Englishes published a themed issue of five papers as a "Symposium on World Englishes and Linguistic Landscapes: Five Perspectives" (2012, vol. 31.1). Similarly, an entire issue of the International Journal of the Sociology of Language (228 in 2014) was devoted to the subject, including looking at signs that show influences from one language on another language. In 2015 an academic journal devoted to this topic was launched, titled Linguistic Landscape: An International Journal, from John Benjamins. There is also a series of academic conferences on the study of linguistic landscape. A comprehensive, searchable Linguistic Landscape Bibliography is available. A 2016 special issue of Manusya (number 22, 2016) begins with a history and summary of the field.

Because "the methodologies employed in the collection and categorisation of written signs is still controversial", basic research questions are still being discussed, such as: "do small, hand-made signs count as much as large, commercially made signs?". The original technical scope of "linguistic landscape" involved plural languages, and almost all writers use it in that sense. Some scholars, however, use the term for public manifestations of writing in monolingual settings, e.g. in a German city, or for controversies over spelling in the public sphere amid people's reactions, e.g. for English-language settings.

== Multilingualism and monolingualism in signs ==
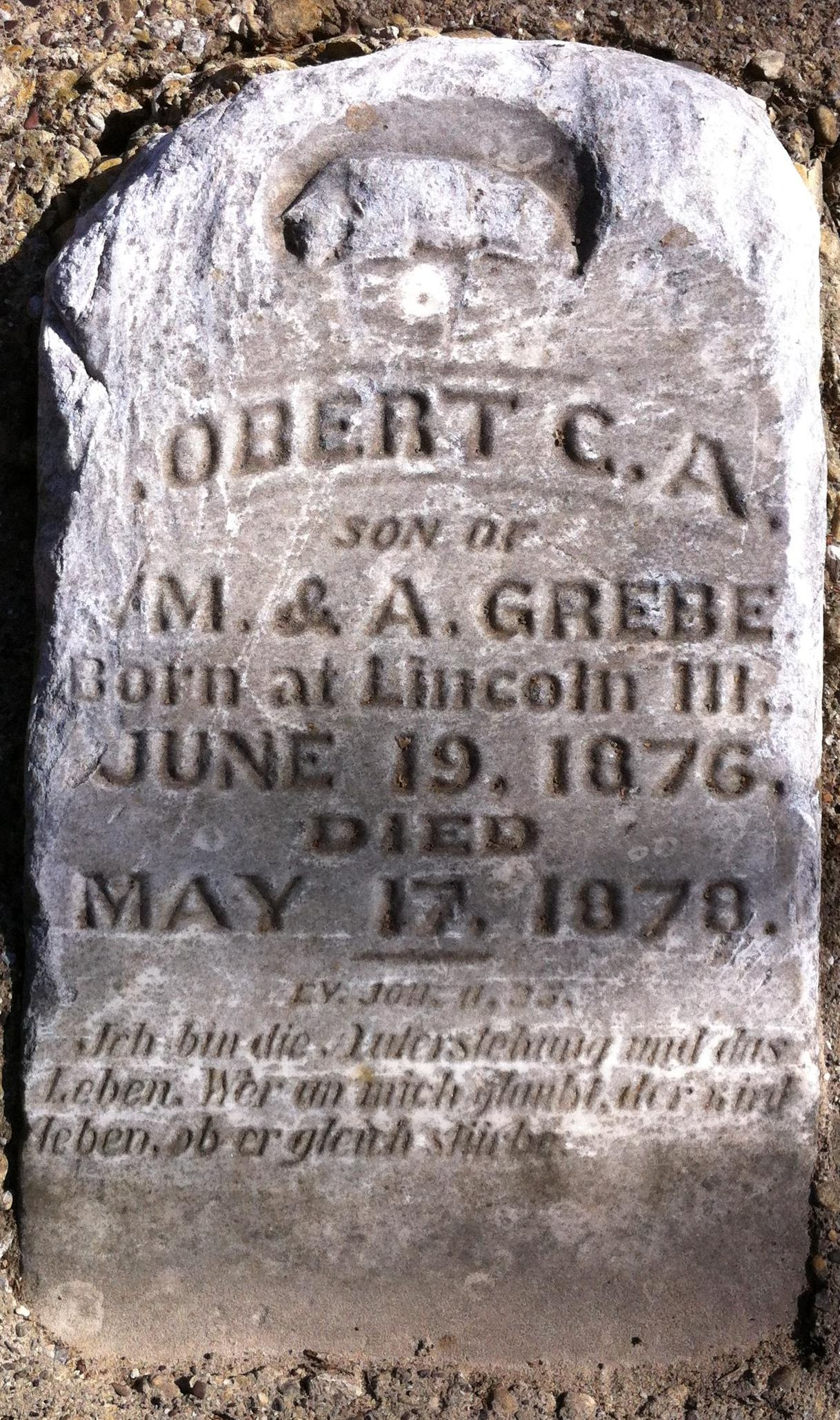
Gravestone: information in English, Bible verse in German, Texas

In much of the research the signs studied are multilingual signs, reflecting an expected multilingual readership. In other cases, there are monolingual signs in different languages, written in relevant languages found within a multilingual community. Backhaus even points out that some signs are not meant to be understood so much as to appeal to readers via a more prestigious language (2007:58).

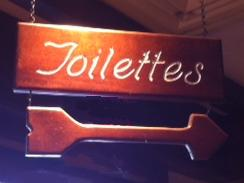
Bathroom sign in French restaurant in USA, spelling "Toilets" to convey a French aura, but understood by unilingual English speakers.

Some signs are spelled to convey the aura of another language (sometimes genuinely spelled as in the other language, other times fictionally), but are still meant to be understood by monolinguals. For example, some signs in English are spelled in a way that conveys the aura of German or French, but are still meant to be understood by monolingual English speakers. Similarly, some signs use Latin script that is aestheticized to look like Chinese characters or Cyrillic script, in order to evoke the associated languages while still being readable to people who don't know them. For example, Leeman and Modan (2010) describe the use of aestheticized Latin script in the Washington DC's Chinatown and the Arab Quarter of Granada, Spain.

The study of linguistic landscape also examines such patterns as which languages are used for which types of institutions (e.g. country club, hospital, ethnic grocery store), which languages are used for more expensive/cheaper items (new cars or used cars), or which languages are used for more expensive/cheaper services (e.g. pool cleaning or washing machine repair). Also, the linguistic landscape can be studied across an area, to see which neighborhoods have signs in which languages. For example, Carr (2017) examined the languages of three cities in Southeast Los Angeles in her dissertation, while Blommaert undertook an ethnography of his local neighbourhood in Antwerp, Belgium to examine how multilingual signs chronicles the complex social and cultural histories of a place.

The languages used in public signs indicate what languages are locally relevant, or give evidence of what languages are becoming locally relevant (Hult 2009; Kasanga 2012). In many multilingual countries, multilingual signs and packaging are taken for granted, especially as merchants try to attract as many customers as possible or people realize that they serve a multilingual community (Hult, 2014). In other places, it is a matter of law, as in Quebec, where signs cannot be in English only, but must include French (Bill 101, Charte de la langue française). In Jerusalem it is legally required that 50% of a business's sign be in Hebrew. In Texas, some signs are required to be in English and Spanish, such as warning signs about consuming alcohol while pregnant.

A grocery store sign in Dallas, TX in three languages English, Amharic, and Spanish.

Linguistic landscape can also be applied to the study of competing scripts for a single language. For example, after the breakup of the Soviet Union, some signs in Mongolia were erected in the traditional Mongolian script, not just Cyrillic (Grivelet 2001). Similarly, in some Cherokee speaking communities, street signs and other public signage is written with the Cherokee syllabary (Bender 2008). Also, license plates in Greek Cyprus have been printed with Greek or Roman letters in different eras.

== Different approaches to linguistic landscape studies ==
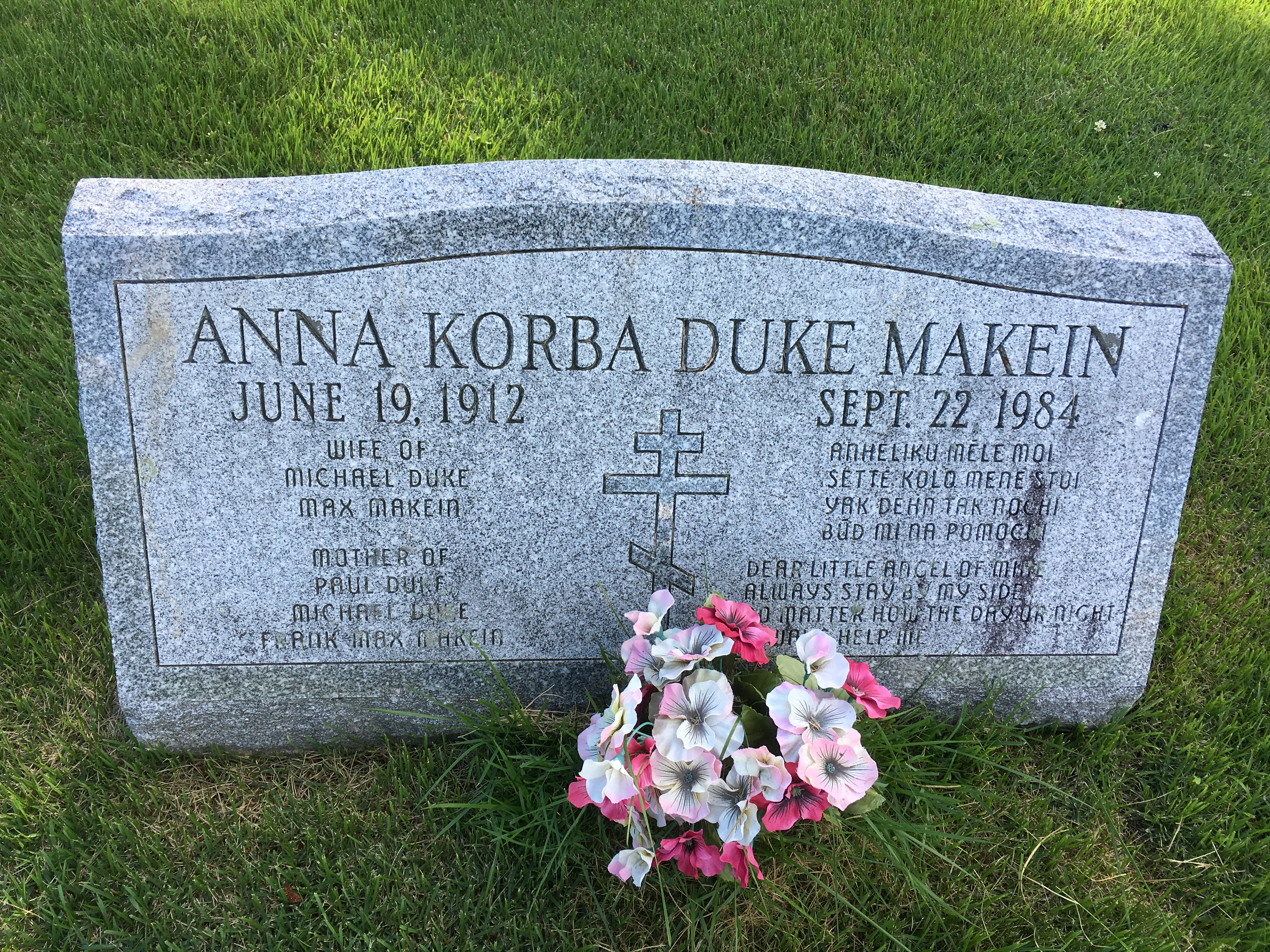
Ukrainian language carved into gravestone, though no longer spoken in the city.

More recently, scholars have rejected the purely quantitative approaches to Linguistic landscape. For example, using Scollon and Scollon's (2003) framework of geosemiotics, researchers have analyzed the placement and relative size of different languages and signs. Other qualitative approaches, such as Jan Blommaert's Ethnographic Linguistic Landscape Analysis or ELLA (2013), have emphasized the importance of ethnography as an element of a linguistic landscape analysis, and argued that signs must be seen as traces of multimodal communicative practices within a sociopolitically and historically structured field. This work was specifically positioned as an attempt to "do more" with linguistic landscape analysis than the "synchronic, static and quantitative approach to hypostatized 'languages' in a given physical arena" that characterized the more quantitative "first wave" of studies. Some recent work, such as Feddersen and his colleagues' approach to interactivity in the linguistic landscape (2024), uses an analytical approach that combines both geosemiotics and ELLA in order to analyze both the spatial-material aspect and the ethnographic aspect of signs.

Leeman and Modan (2009) proposed a "contextualized historical approach" to linguistic landscape that emphasizes the importance of considering how the signs came to be, and what they mean in a given context. Their example of the different symbolic meanings of Chinese and English on Starbucks signs in Washington DC's Chinatown and a Shanghai shopping mall shows that it is unwise to draw conclusions based on the relative frequency of languages in signage.

The study of the linguistic landscape can also show evidence of the presence and roles of different languages through history. Some early work on a specific form of linguistic landscape was done in cemeteries used by immigrant communities, some languages being carved "long after the language ceased to be spoken" in the communities.

In addition to larger public signage, some who study linguistic landscapes are now including the study of other public objects with multilingual texts, such as banknotes in India which are labeled in over a dozen languages.

== Politics and the linguistic landscape ==
While the politics of language, particularly around which particular languages are privileged and which are not, has been an important focus for the discipline since its earliest beginnings, the role that the linguistic landscape can play in politics more generally is increasingly becoming a topic for investigation.

Philip Seargeant's study of Political Activism in the Linguistic Landscape, for example, examines how the UK activist group Led by Donkeys used a variety of sociolinguistic strategies drawing on the affordances of public space to expose acts of political hypocrisy. The book is also notable for using a graphic novel format to analyse its topic.

The murals of Northern Ireland are another context in which the politics of linguistic landscapes have been foregrounded. Tony Crowley, in particular, has collected images of Northern Irish muralism, and explained them through a historical analysis of cultural hegemony in Northern Ireland This work demonstrates that partisan groups in Northern Ireland have commissioned murals throughout the twenty-first century, partly to define public space as Republican or Loyalist.

Research has also begun to consider the linguistic and semiotic landscapes of video games. Kate Spowage examines the semiotic landscapes of post-apocalyptic American cities in The Last of Us, and treats them as ideological signs that can be explained partly through the politics of video game production. She argues that video games are important sites for the politics of language and linguistic landscapes, because they are technologies that function ideologically, and because they reach very large audiences.

== Linguistic landscape studies on areas of conflict ==
The study of language in post-war and conflict-ridden areas has also attracted the interest of scholars who applied the Linguistic Landscape approach as a method to explore how language use in the public space represents ethnic groups, reflects territorial conflicts, expresses statehood and projects ideologies and socio-cultural identities. Themistocleous (2019) for instance explored the use of Greek and Turkish on public signs in the centre of Nicosia (Cyprus) and found that traditional discourses of separation and conflict are dominant in the public space but at the same time new discourses of unification, peace and integration slowly begin to surface.

=== Linguistic landscape in the Galician community ===
Galicia or Galiza is an officially autonomous community in Spain, where Galician and Spanish are spoken, although they do not peacefully coexist. Several scholars (e.g. Celso Alvarez Caccamo or Mario Herrero Valeiro) have studied the complexity of conflicts related to the coexistence of Galician and Spanish, and the power struggles around the standardization of Galician language, for example regarding orthography and pronunciation. In fact, despite the passing of laws to implement and enforce the usage of Galician in public discourse and public space, the very form of Galician chosen is at the center of political struggles, with the official variety (oficialista), which is more similar to Spanish, chosen over the one more similar to Portuguese (Reintegrationist). For this reason, different spellings of Galician appear in the Galician linguistic landscape, showing not only stratification of discourses, but also approptiation and contestation of public space and dialogicity in the linguistic landscape.

Although the legislation of the autonomous community of Galicia enforces the use of Galician in the public space, what is at stake is the form of Galician chosen for signs, banners, announcements, billboards, public road signs and toponyms, with the official form (oficialista) rejected by some activists and many (but not all) most radical Galician nationalists as too Spanishist, despite social and political elites' efforts for constructing it so to look autonomous both from Spanish and Portuguese, and the more Portuguese one reclaimed as not only more appropriate from glottological perspective but also from a social and political perspective. This situation has been called "spelling war" by Mario Herrero Valeiro.

=== Linguistic landscape in the Valencian community ===
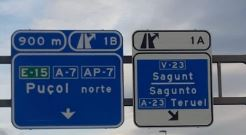
Bilingual (Valencian, Spanish) road sign along the highway in the Valencian Community.

Valencia is an officially bilingual city, where Valencian and Spanish populations coexist. In this territory the Valencian language lives in a situation of diglossia, and therefore the Valencian public institutions must maintain, protect and promote the use of the Valencian language. To ensure this, in 2005 the Valencia City Council developed "the Reglamento municipal sobre uso y normalización del valenciano en el municipio de Valencia" ("Municipal Regulations on the Use and Standardisation of Valencian Language in the Municipality of Valencia"). The autonomous legislation of Valencia considers the use of Valencian as the preferred language for signs, banners, announcements, billboards, public road signs and toponyms. Moreover, the autonomous government and the municipal regulations from Valencia encourage private entities to use Valencian over Spanish in their efforts to raise the prestige and recognition of the language, which, despite being official, is used by minority throughout the territory.

Socially speaking, the Valencian Community is a territory with a great number of inhabitants who are either monolingual in Spanish, or bilingual in Spanish-Valencian, and it is a strongly touristy region. There is international tourism, especially from England and Northern Europe, and also national tourism. Among the use of other languages within the territory, the use of English is noteworthy as a lingua franca or vehicular language. For this reason, many shops use English in order to be accessible to a wider public. As described by Bruyèl-Olmedo and Juan-Garau, "among the number of languages featured on signs, shop fronts, billboards and the like, English enjoys a privileged position when it comes to addressing a multilingual, heterogeneous readership"

=== Basque and Spanish languages ===
The Basque Country has invested in the protection of bilingualism, with particular regard to the introduction of measures aimed at ensuring the normalisation of the Basque language in institutions and the achievement of equal rights in its use and enjoyment for citizens, which at the moment is not fully achieved, especially in the working environment. In fact, according to the Unesco Atlas of the World's Languages in Danger, Basque is a minority and vulnerable language in its own territory, and is in an asymmetrical situation with respect to the other official language, Spanish. The challenge, therefore, is to bring the two official languages (Castilian and Euskara) up to the same level in practice, beyond the formal recognition they have already enjoyed since 1978, the year in which the newborn Constitution established in the second paragraph of Article 3 that all other languages should be equally official in their respective Autonomous Communities.

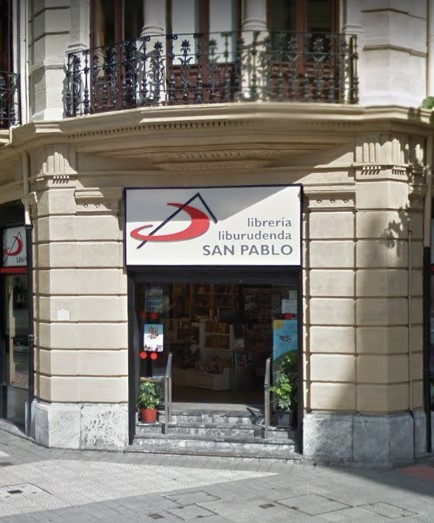
Bilingual sign (Spanish, Basque) at a bookstore in Bilbao

This historic concession constituted a decisive change of direction after the years of Franco's dictatorship, during which the regime had banned the use of the Basque language and attempted to erase its history and traditions.

The Statute of Autonomy of the Basque Country (1979), for its part, proclaimed the status of the Basque language as its own official language in the Autonomous Community of the Basque Country and the right of all persons to know and use both official languages (Article 6.1). Finally, Article 6.4 provided that the Royal Academy of the Basque Language-Euskaltzaindia is the official consultative institution with regard to Basque.

Getting to the present day, in 2009 of the approximately two million people living in the Autonomous Community of the Basque Country, or Euskadi, only around 35% spoke Euskera, the Basque language, a non-Indo-European language isolate. Apart from that, notably Euskera had also a 9% of speakers in the Autonomous Community of Navarre and 26% in the Basque territories in the south of France.

At the time, it was in the second year of the Basque Government's fourth planning period (2008-2012). Since then, the major intervention made is that contained in Decree 179/2019 of 19 November 2019, which gave to each local council the decision-making power on how to organise the use of both languages in its internal and public relations.

This decree put an end to the stage of a single rule for all local entities, and opened a new time in which each local institution could decide which language to use according to its sociolinguistic reality.

Among its objectives: to make Basque the language of work and of relations between administrations, to rationalise the use of translations and interpretations and to promote the use of the language in and from municipalities.

== Examples ==
The three-language (Tamil, English and Hindi) name board at the Tirusulam railway station in South India. Almost all railway stations in India have signs in three or more languages (English, Hindi and the local language). The iconography also borrows the London Underground roundel.

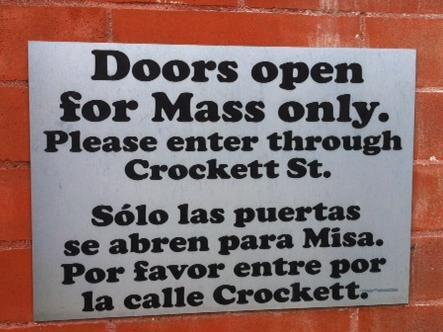
Spanish-English sign at Cathedral Santuario de Guadalupe in Dallas, Texas; the congregation has both English and Spanish speakers.

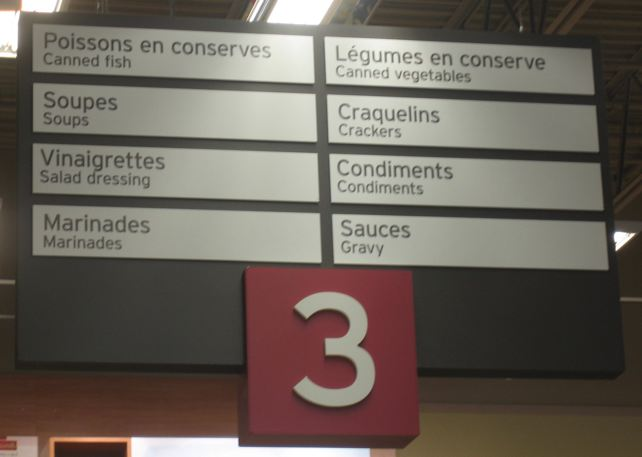
Bilingual sign in a Quebec supermarket with markedly predominant French text.

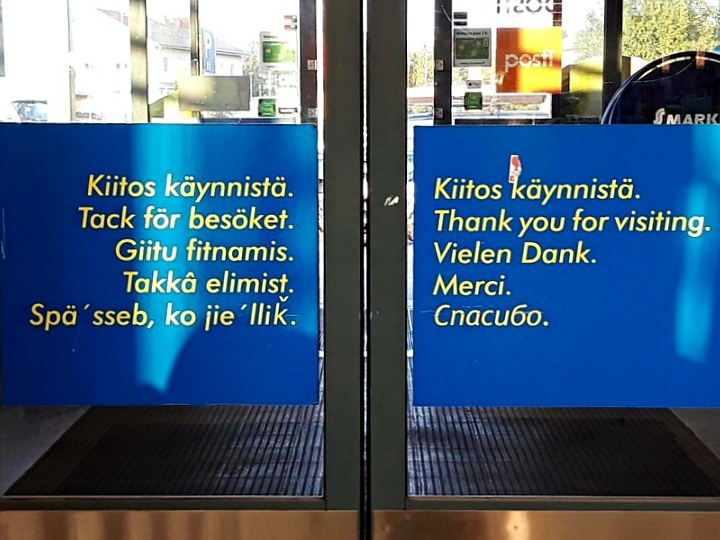
At Ivalo in Finnish Lapland, a set of doors in an S-Market thank customers for having visited the store in the domestic languages of Finnish, Swedish, Northern Saami, Inari Saami and Skolt Saami on the left; Finnish and four tourist languages — English, German, French and Russian — on the right.

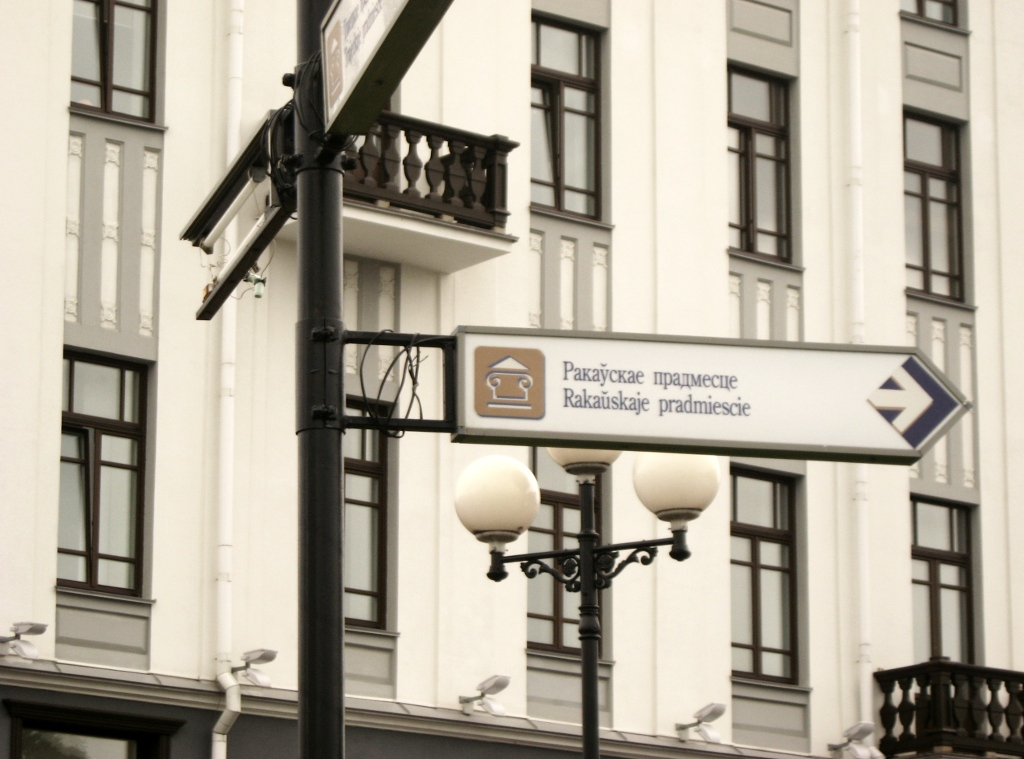
Monolingual biscriptal street sign in Belarusian in Minsk, Belarus.

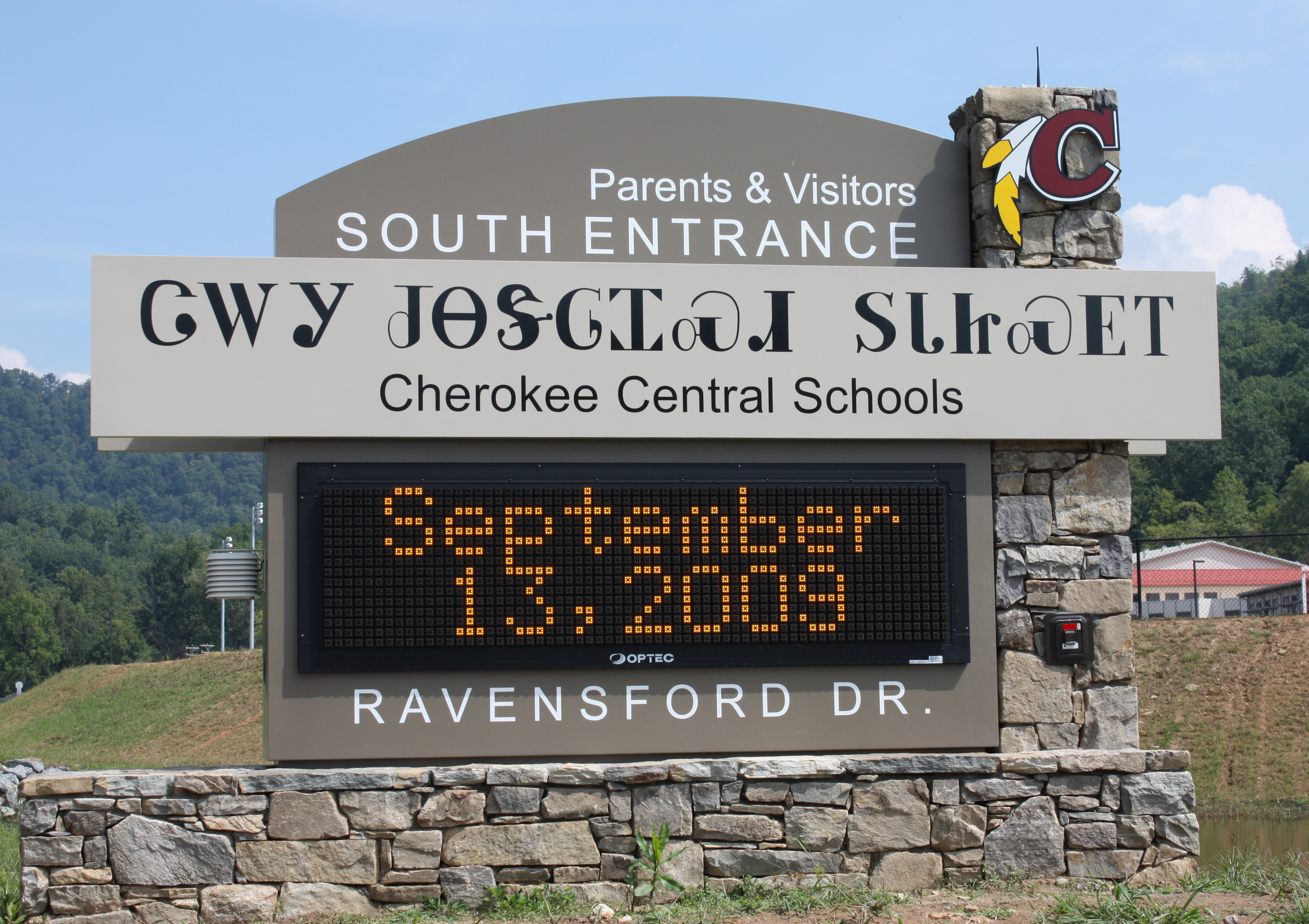
English and Cherokee sign: Cherokee visually prominent but less functional.

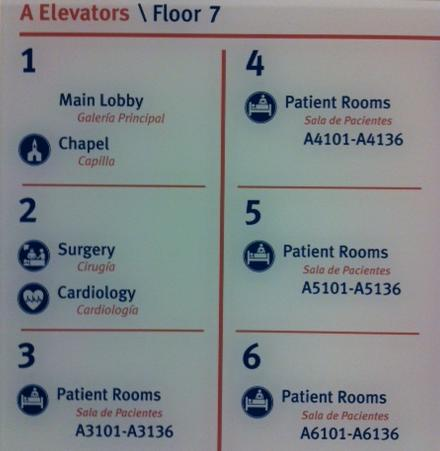
English and Spanish hospital directory, English prominent, in USA.

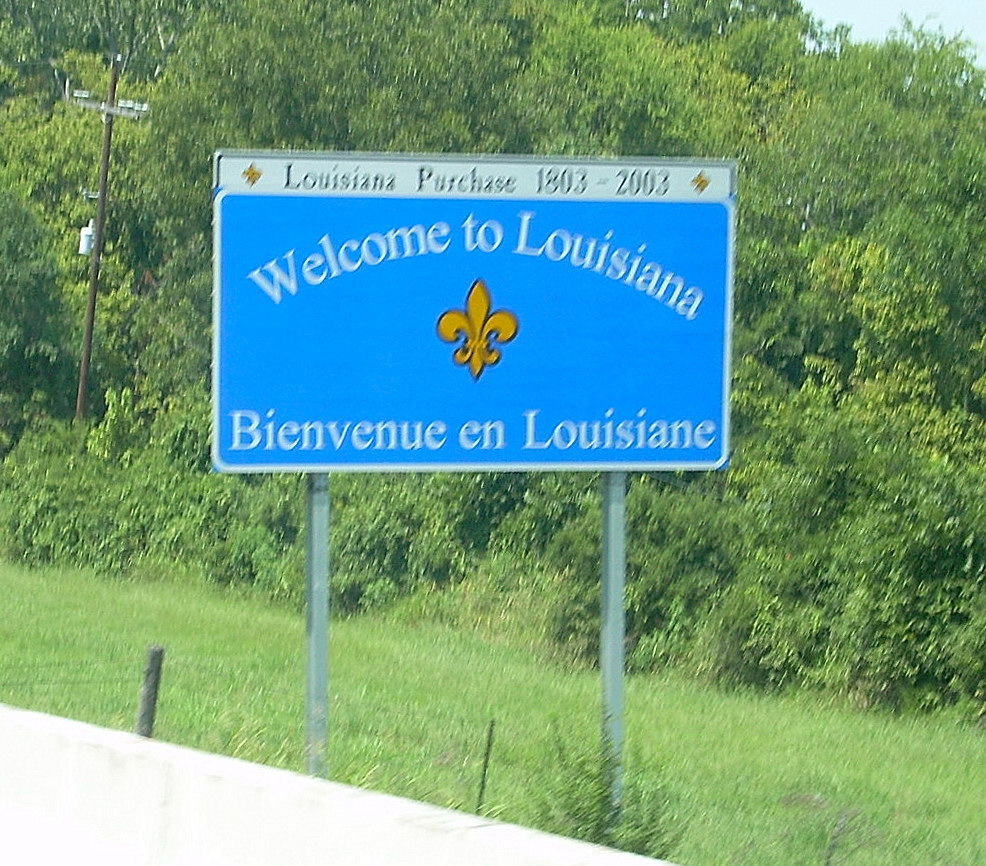
English and French sign in Louisiana, French written to indicate historical link, not so much to be understood

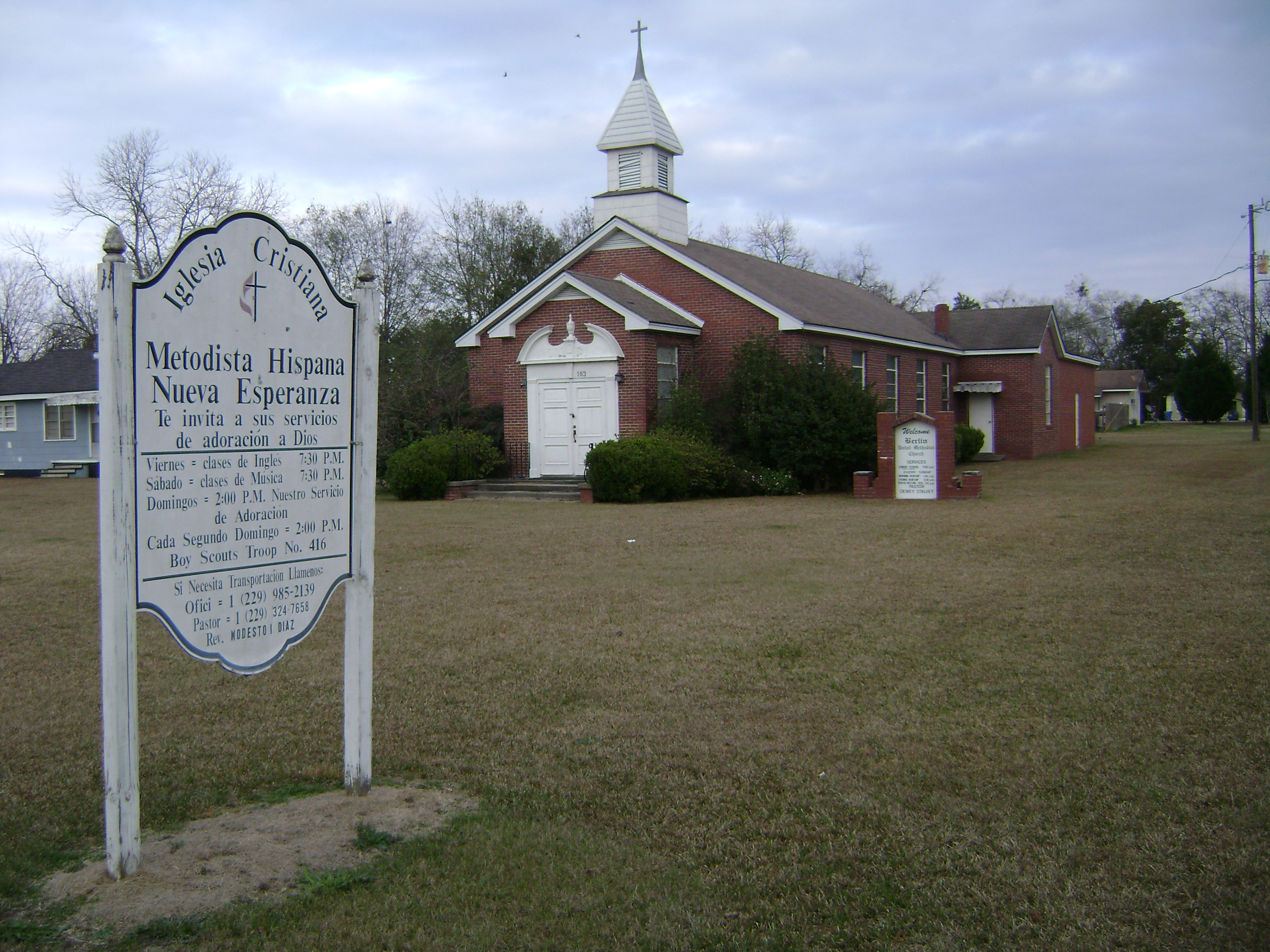
Spanish church sign in Georgia, USA, addressed entirely to Spanish readers.

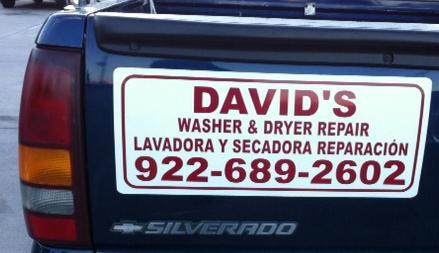
Washing machine repairman advertising on his truck, in English and Spanish, English on top, Texas

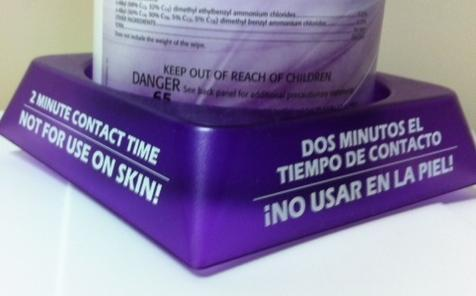
Product originally labeled in English; bilingual warning base added for any hospital visitors & workers who are Spanish-dominant.

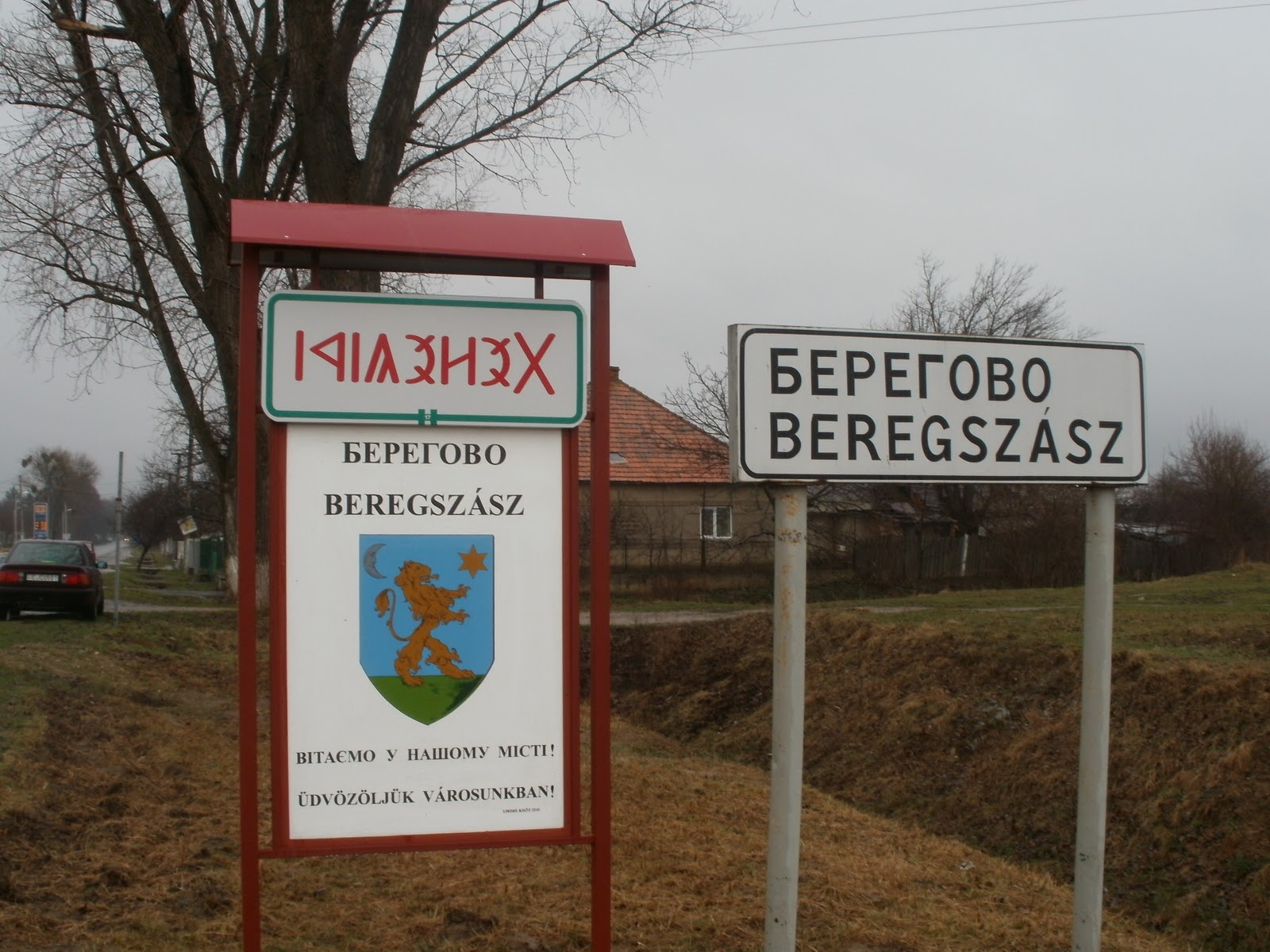
Bilingual sign, in three scripts, near Hungary-Ukraine border.

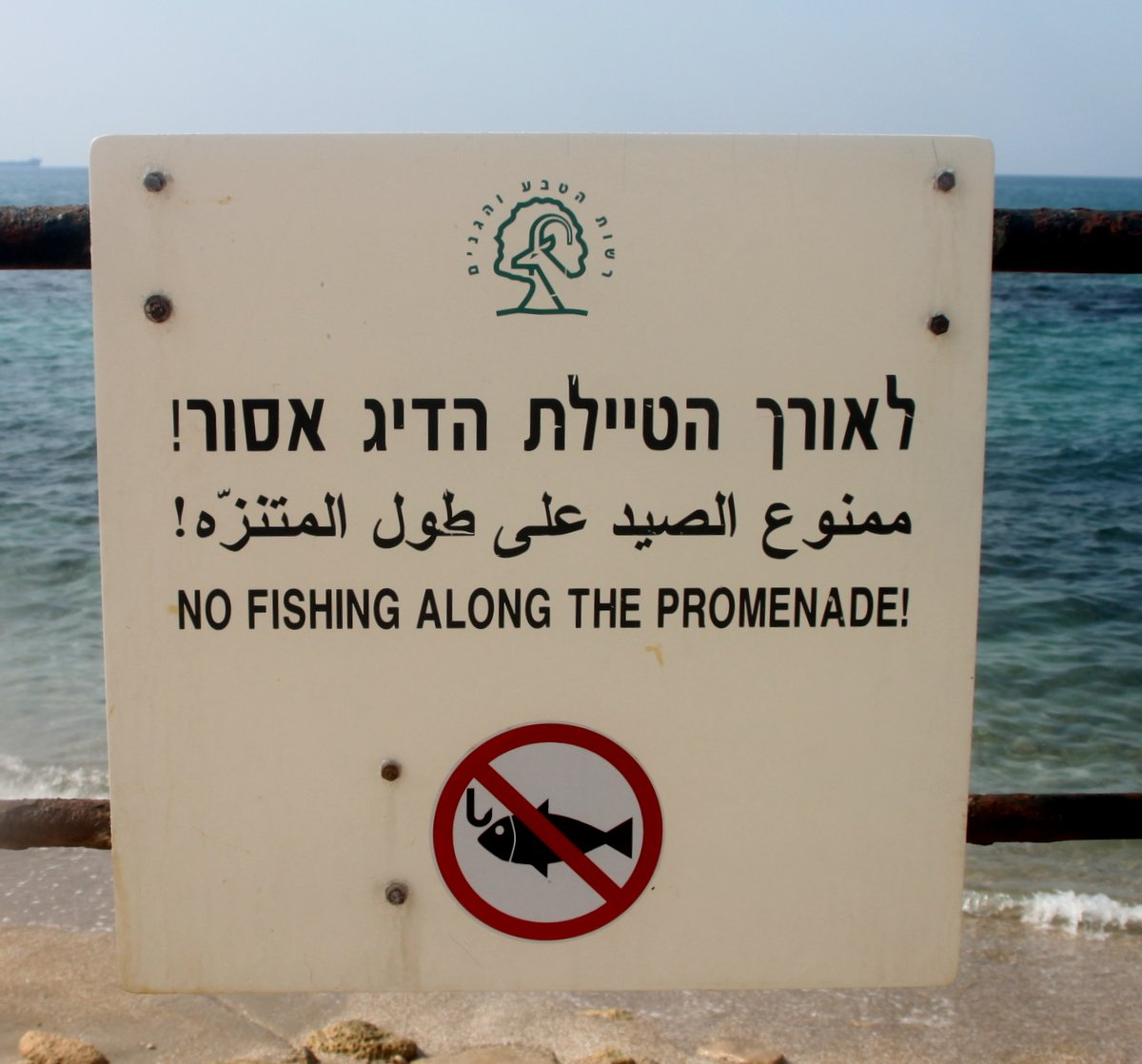
Sign in Israel written in Hebrew (official language), Arabic (widespread language), plus in English.

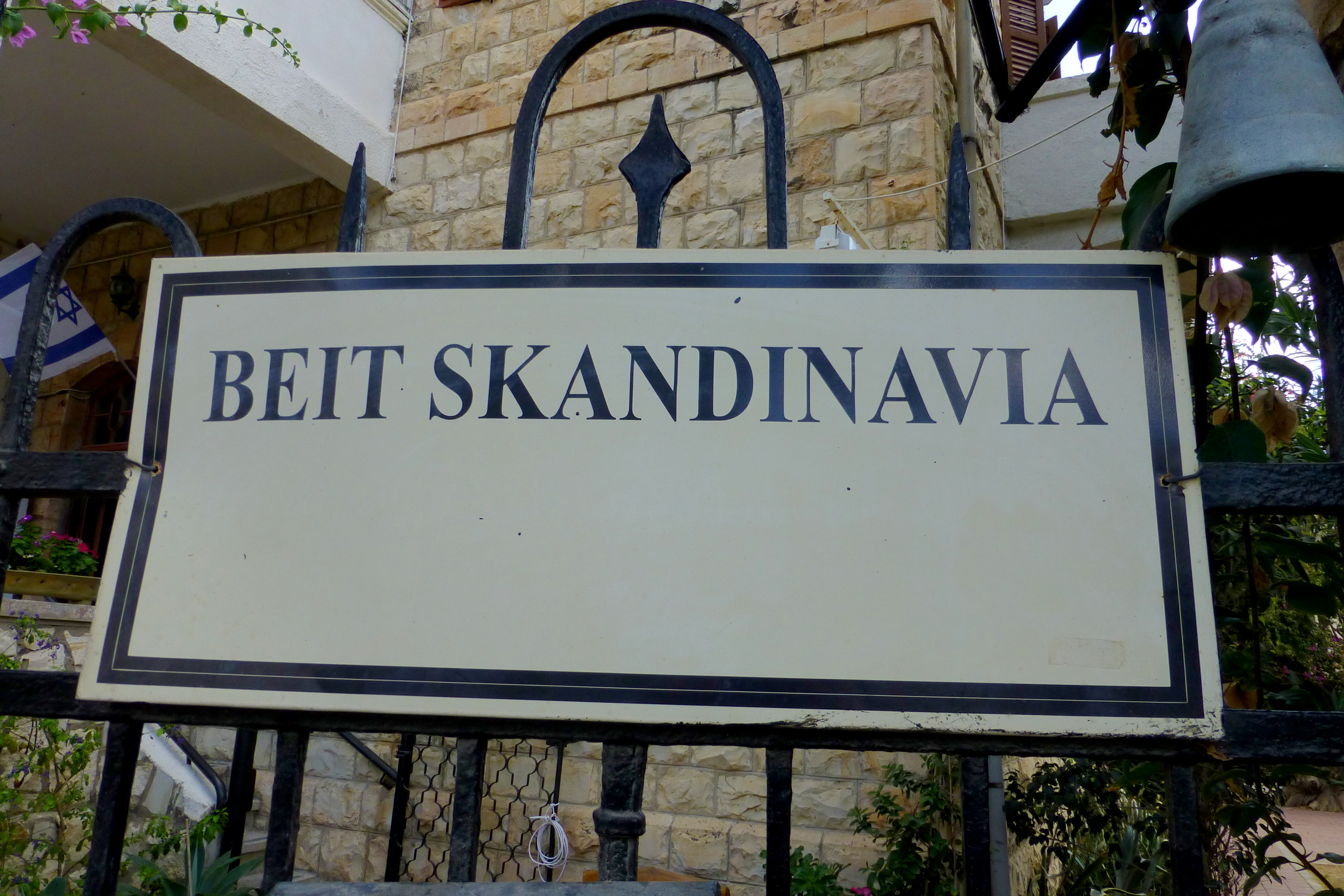
Sign in Roman script but Hebrew words, a hostel in Haifa, Israel catering to European gentiles

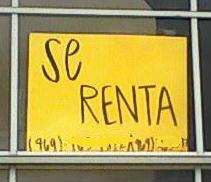
This Spanish sign was advertising a mobile home for rent in a largely Hispanic neighborhood in Texas. The broader community is predominantly non-Spanish speaking.

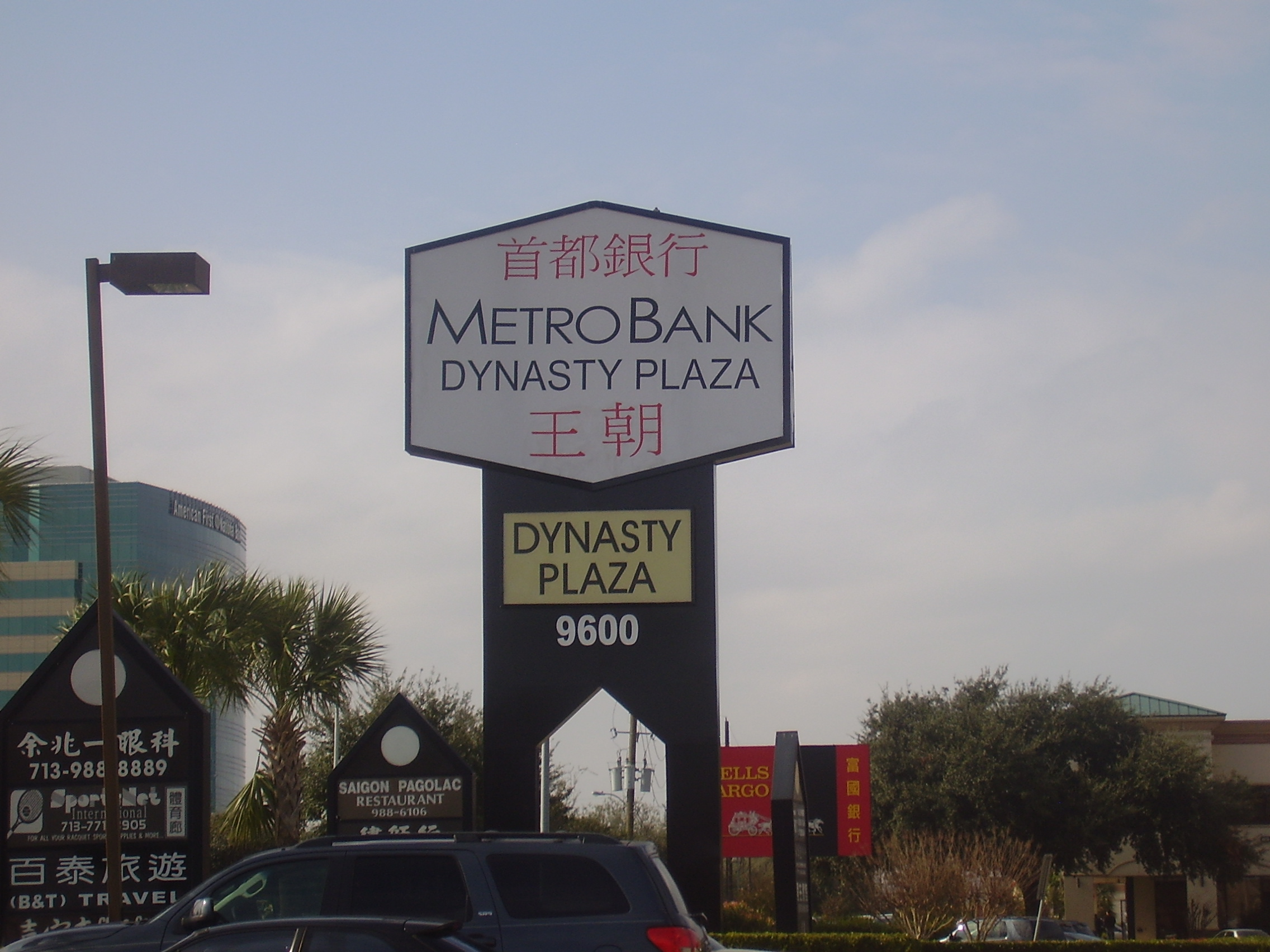
Commercial signs in section of Houston, Texas with large Asian population.

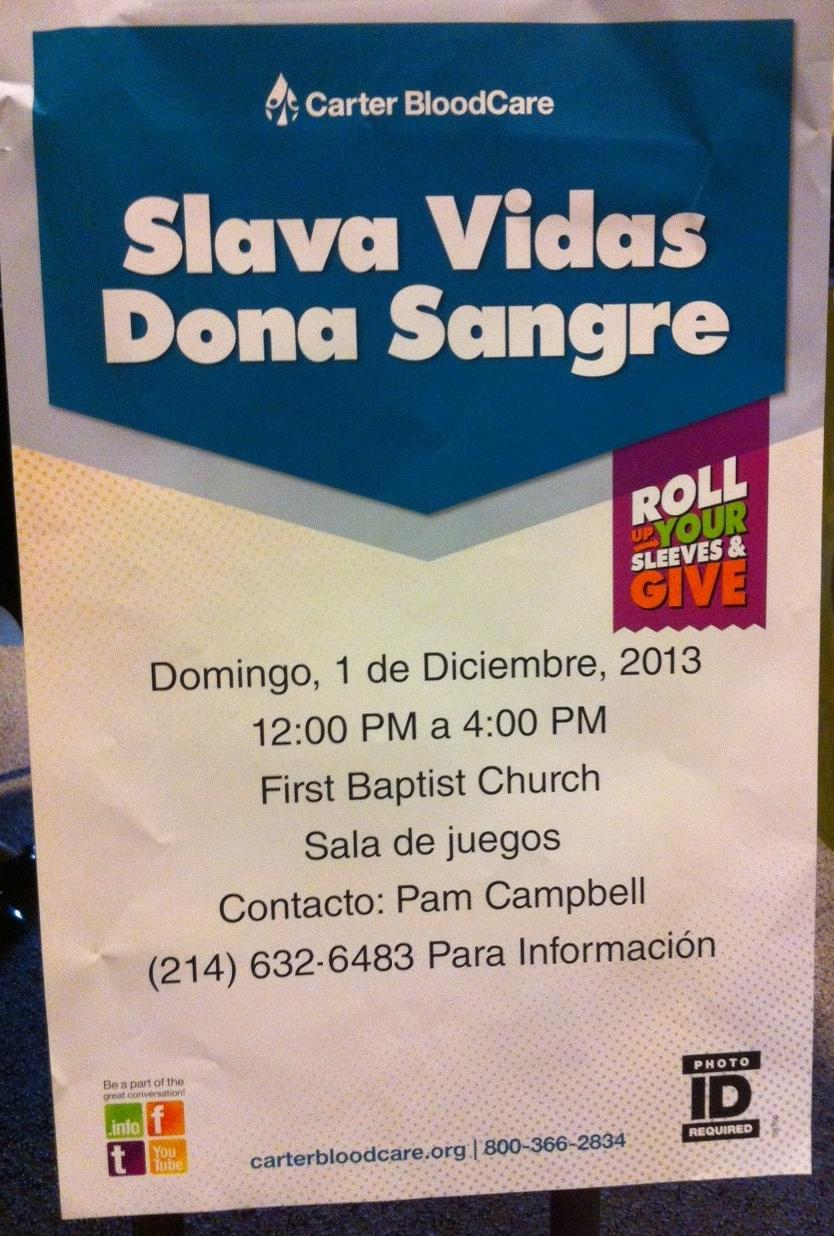
Predominantly Spanish sign in Texas church working to welcome Spanish speakers, near English version of same sign

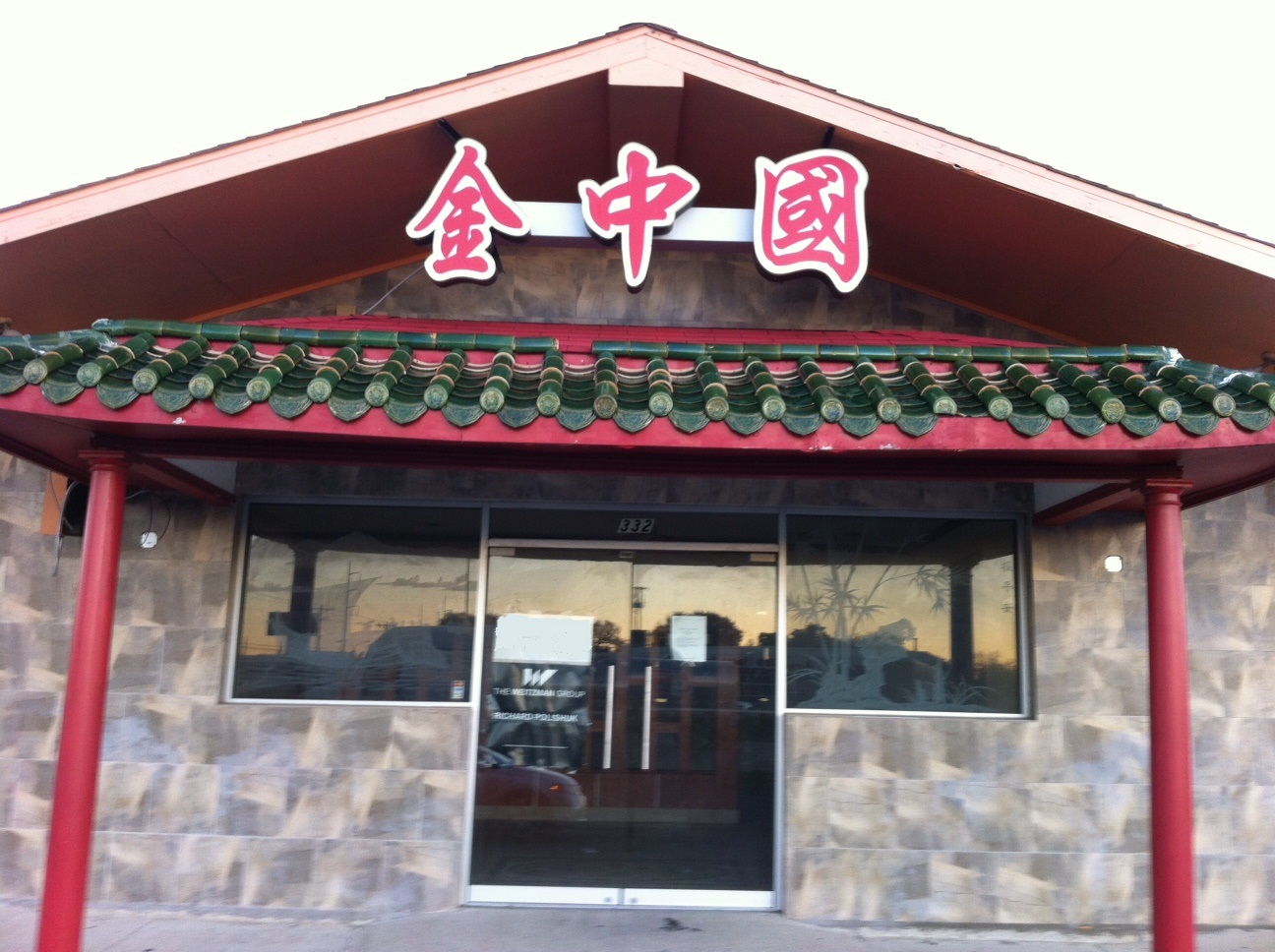
Chinese sign on restaurant in America, conveying Chinese aura but not propositional content.

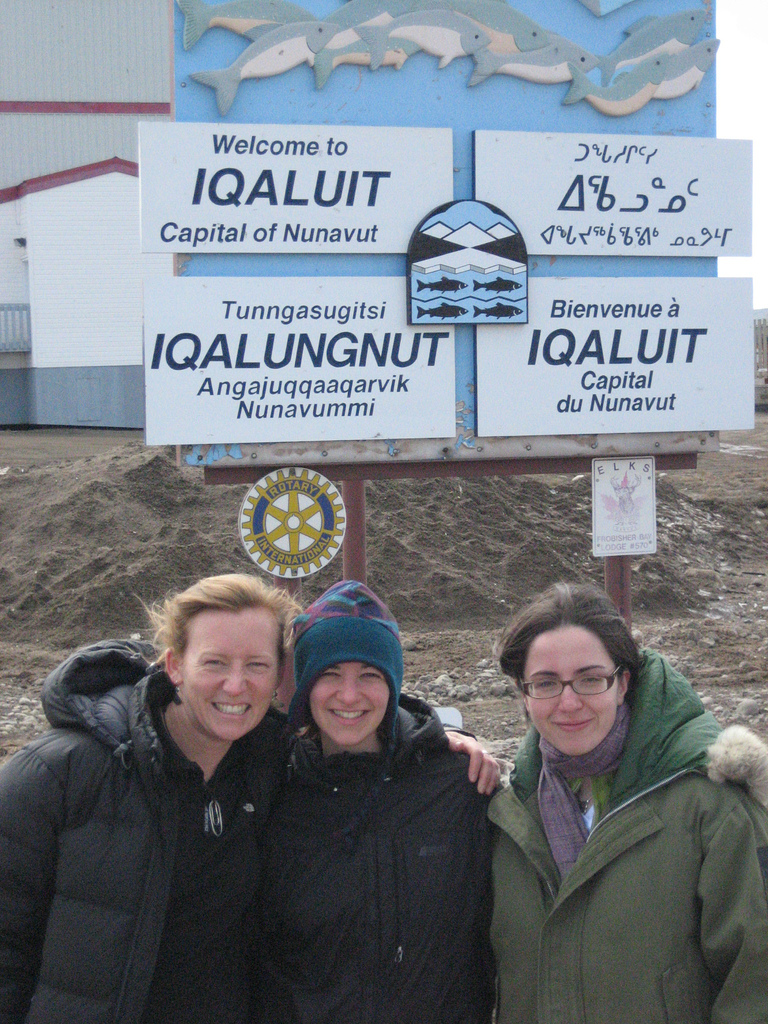
Trilingual, biscriptal sign in Nunavut, Canada, using Canadian Aboriginal Syllabic script

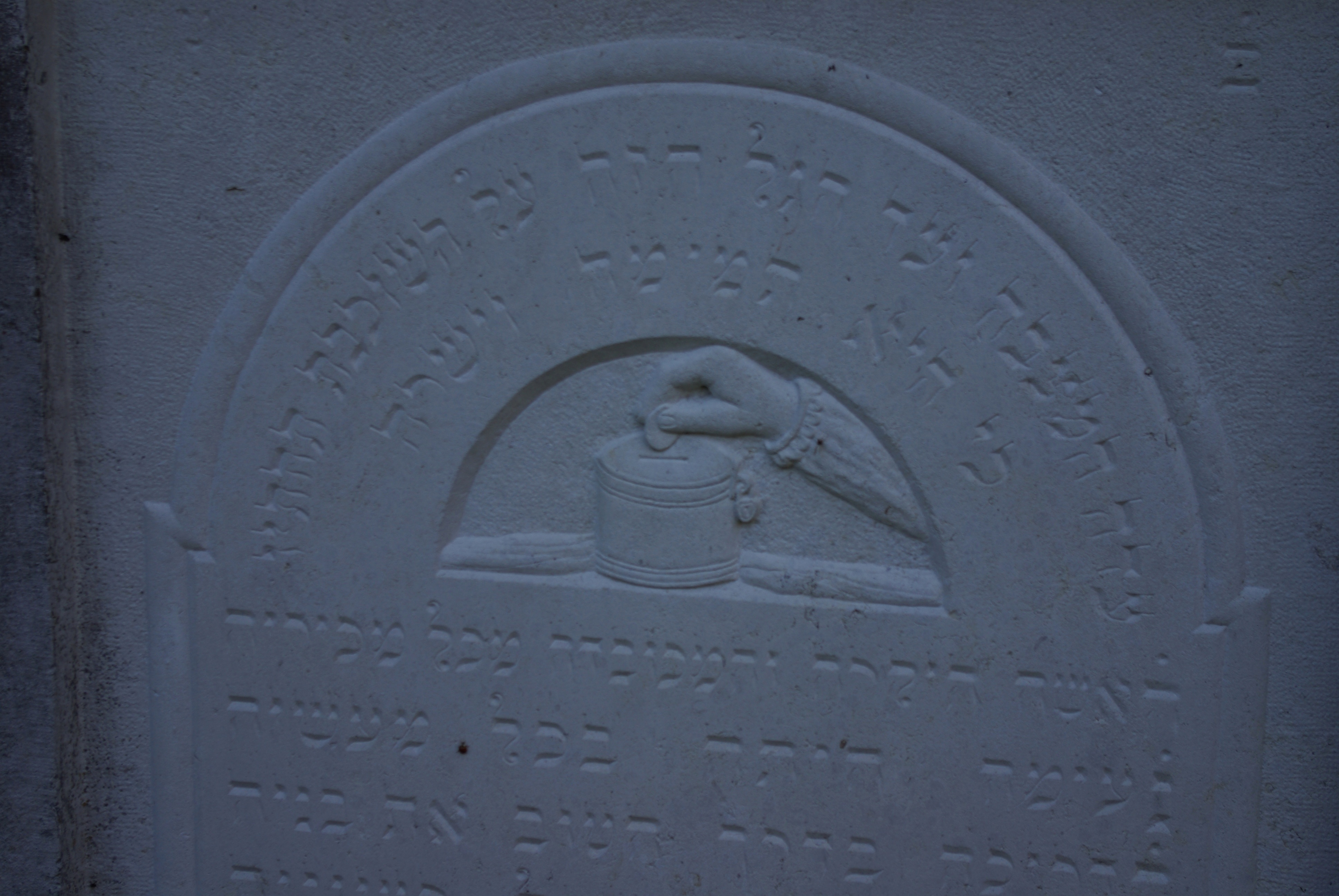
Hebrew gravestone in Germany

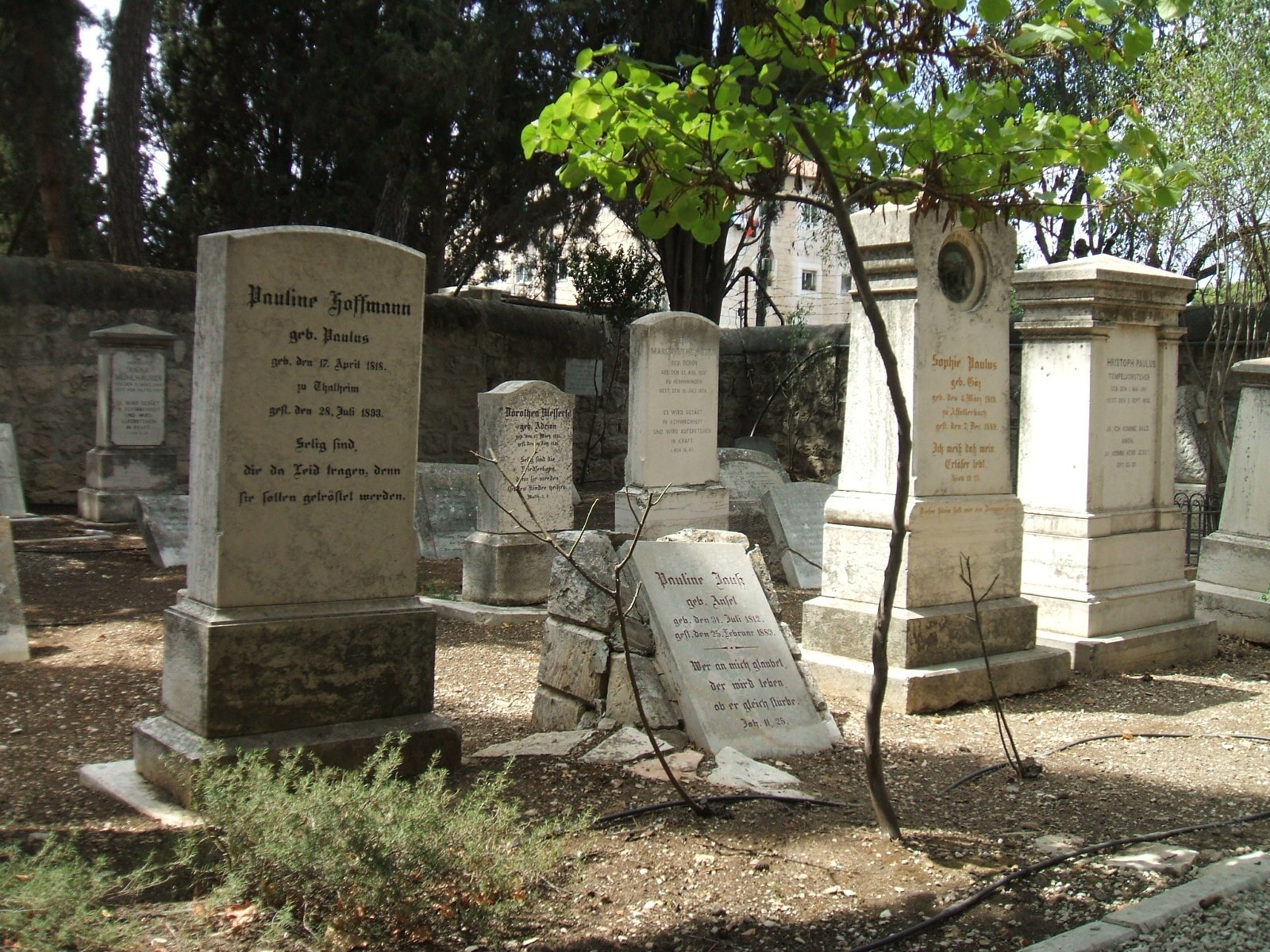
German gravestone in Israel

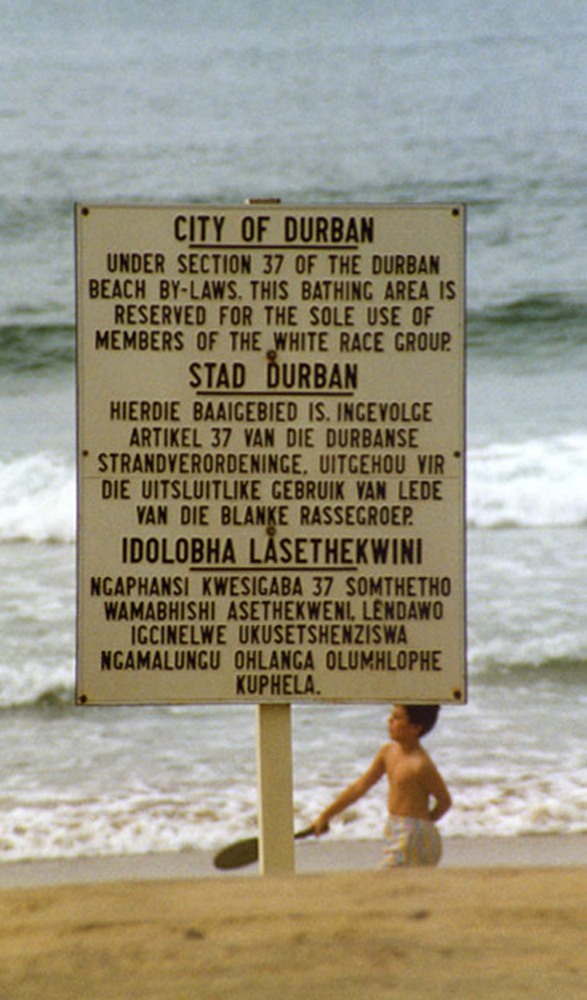
Apartheid era trilingual sign in South Africa

Gujarati and English sign on shop in English-speaking town in America, a Hindu talisman in the Gujarati language

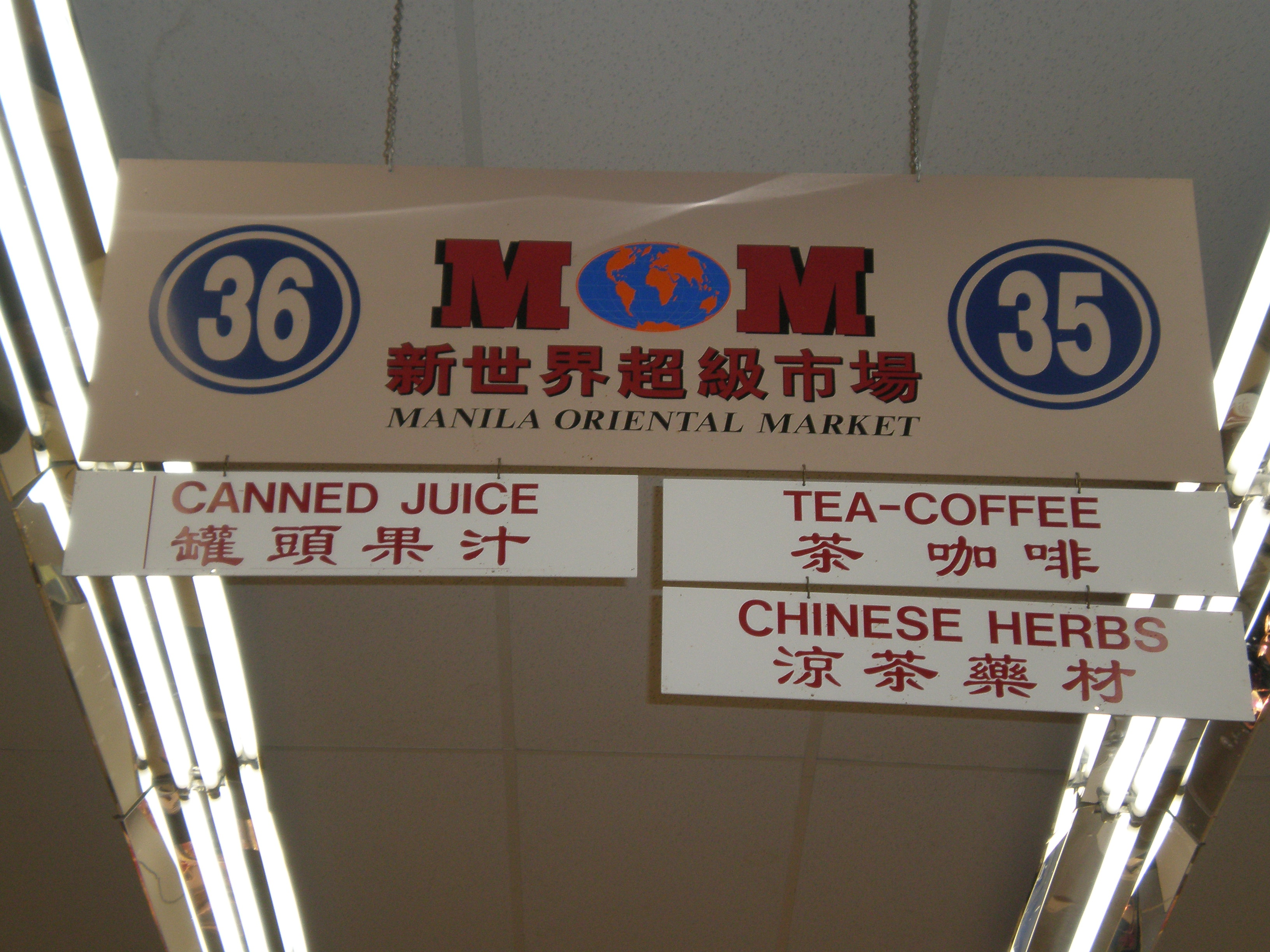
Manila Oriental Market, grocery store in Daly, CA catering to many customers of Asian origin

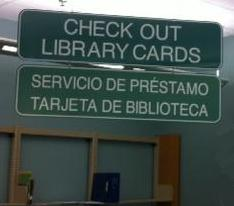
A library sign in English with Spanish below, in Texas. The city has many Spanish speakers moving in, so the public library has added Spanish books and Spanish signs.

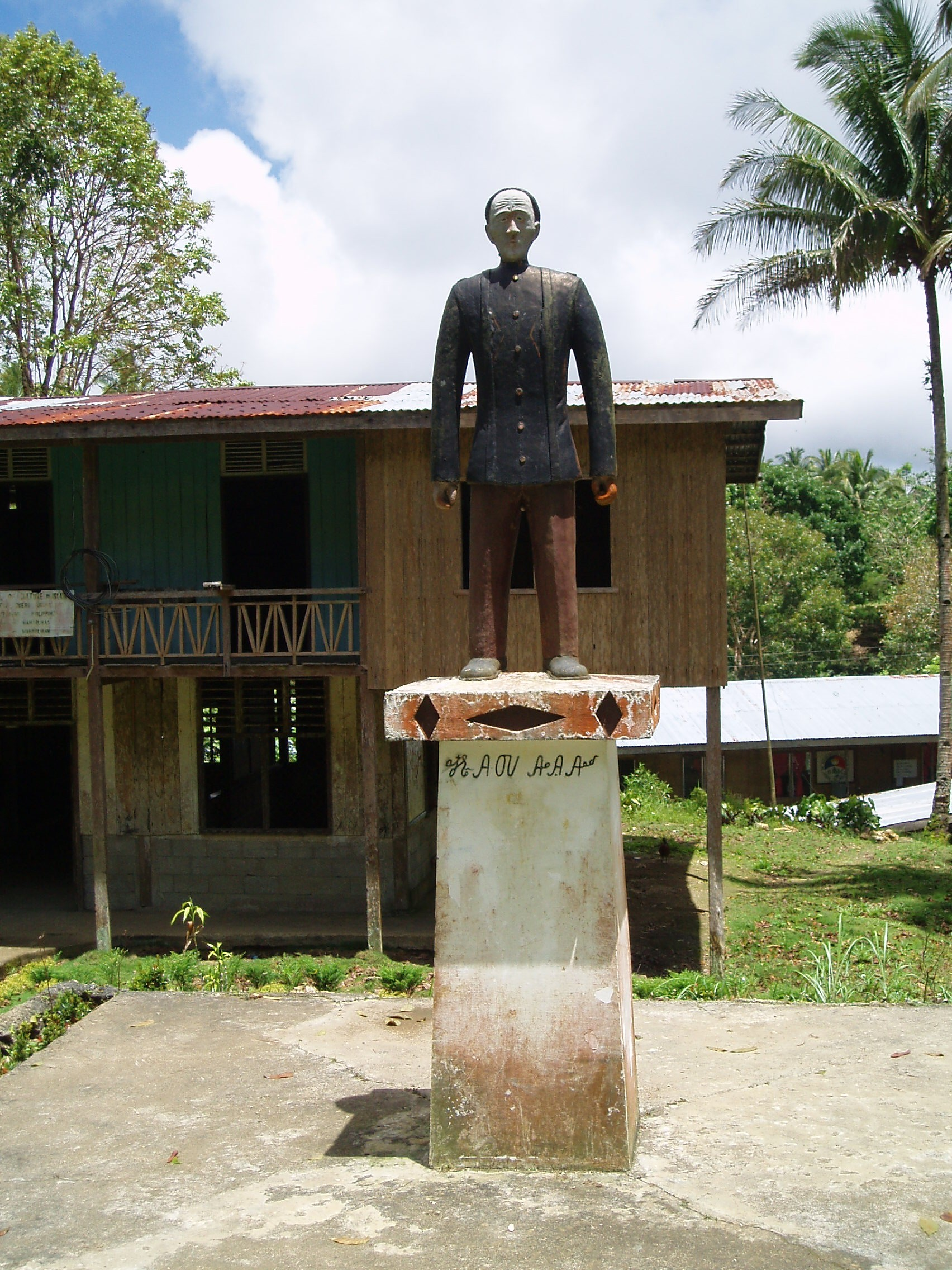
Statue of Mariano Datahan in Bohol, Philippines, early promoter of the Eskayan language and script, labeled in Eskayan with its unique script

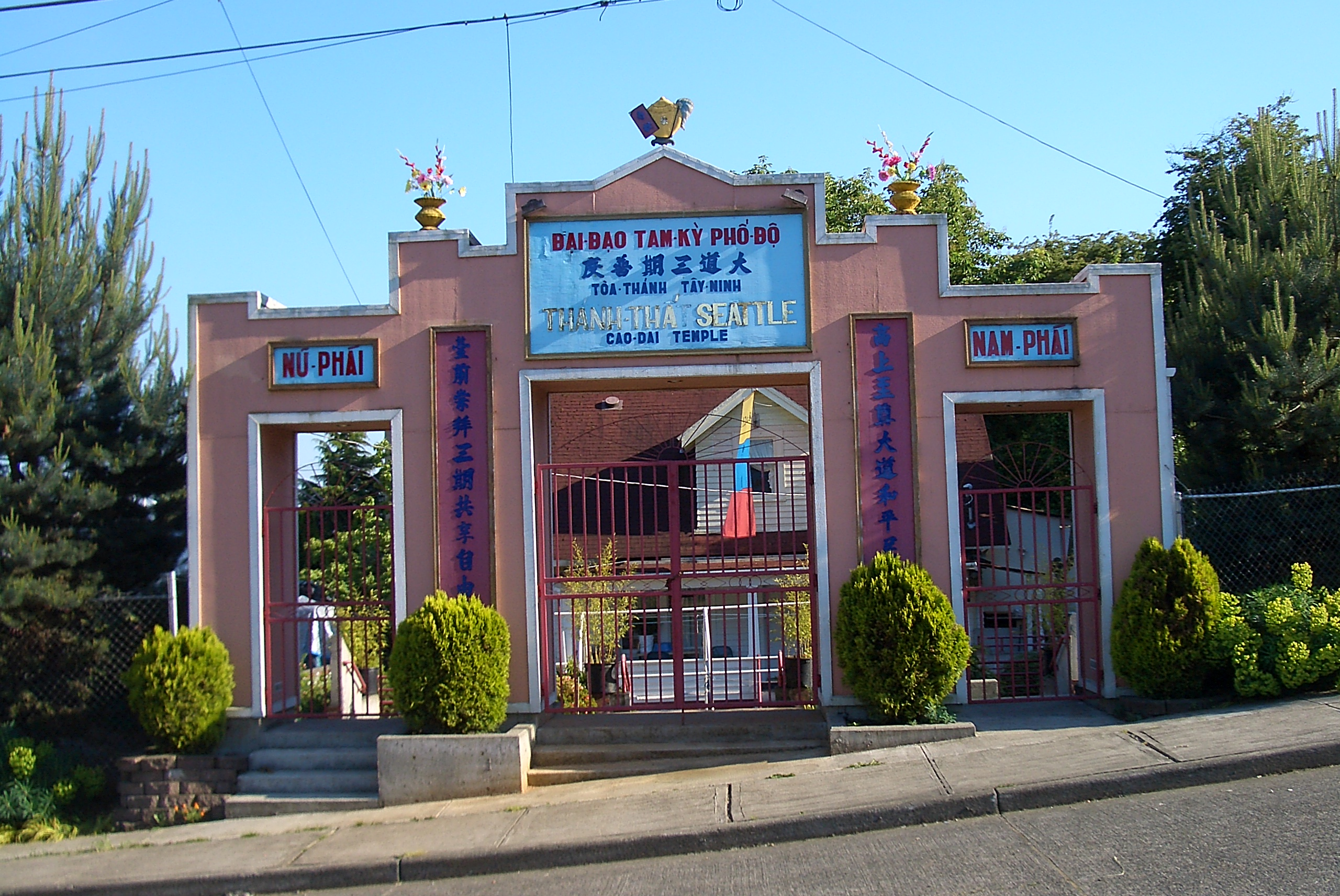
Vietnamese temple in Seattle, sign in three languages

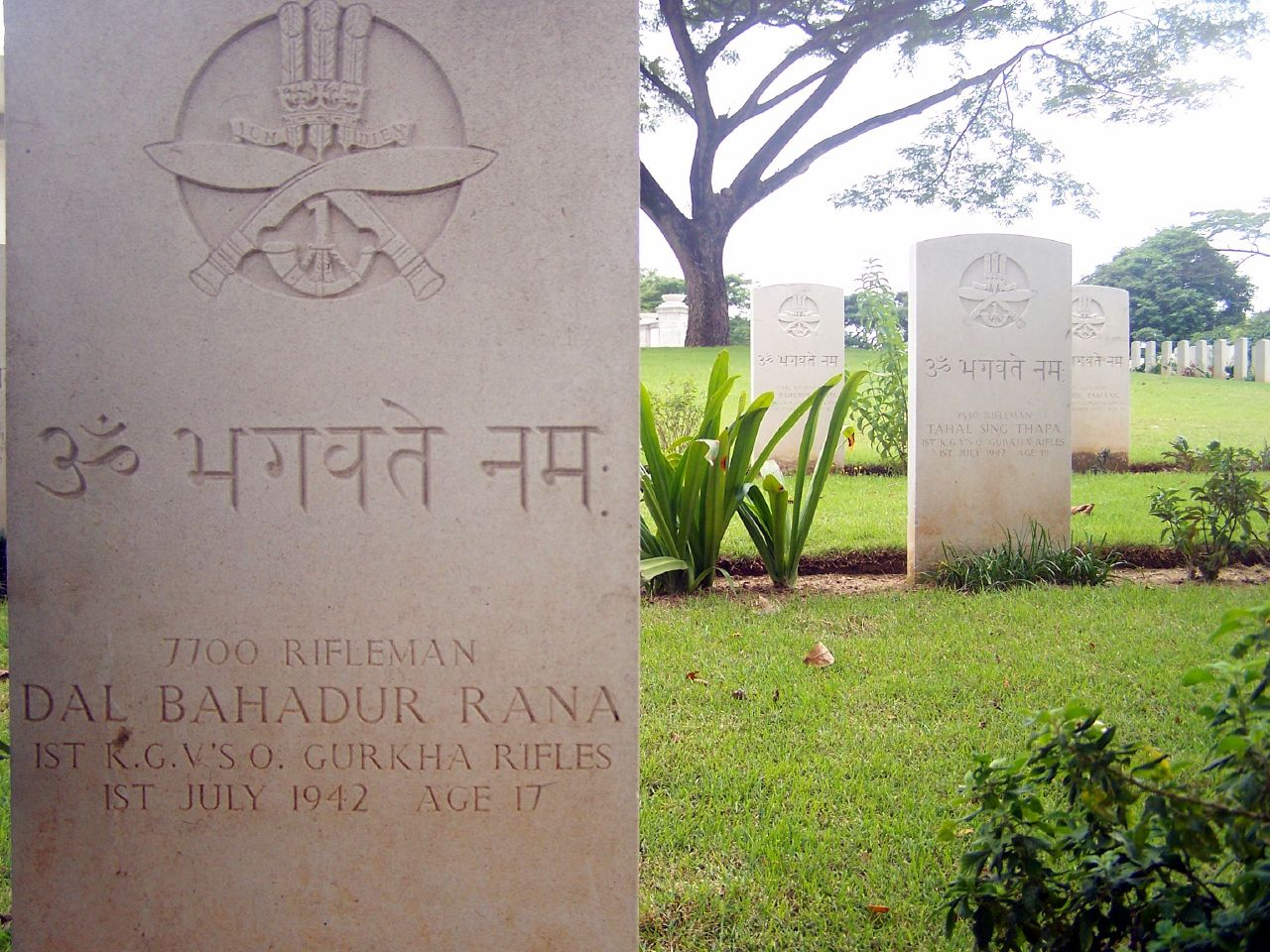
Tombstone for Gurkha soldier who served in British army, in Gurkha and English

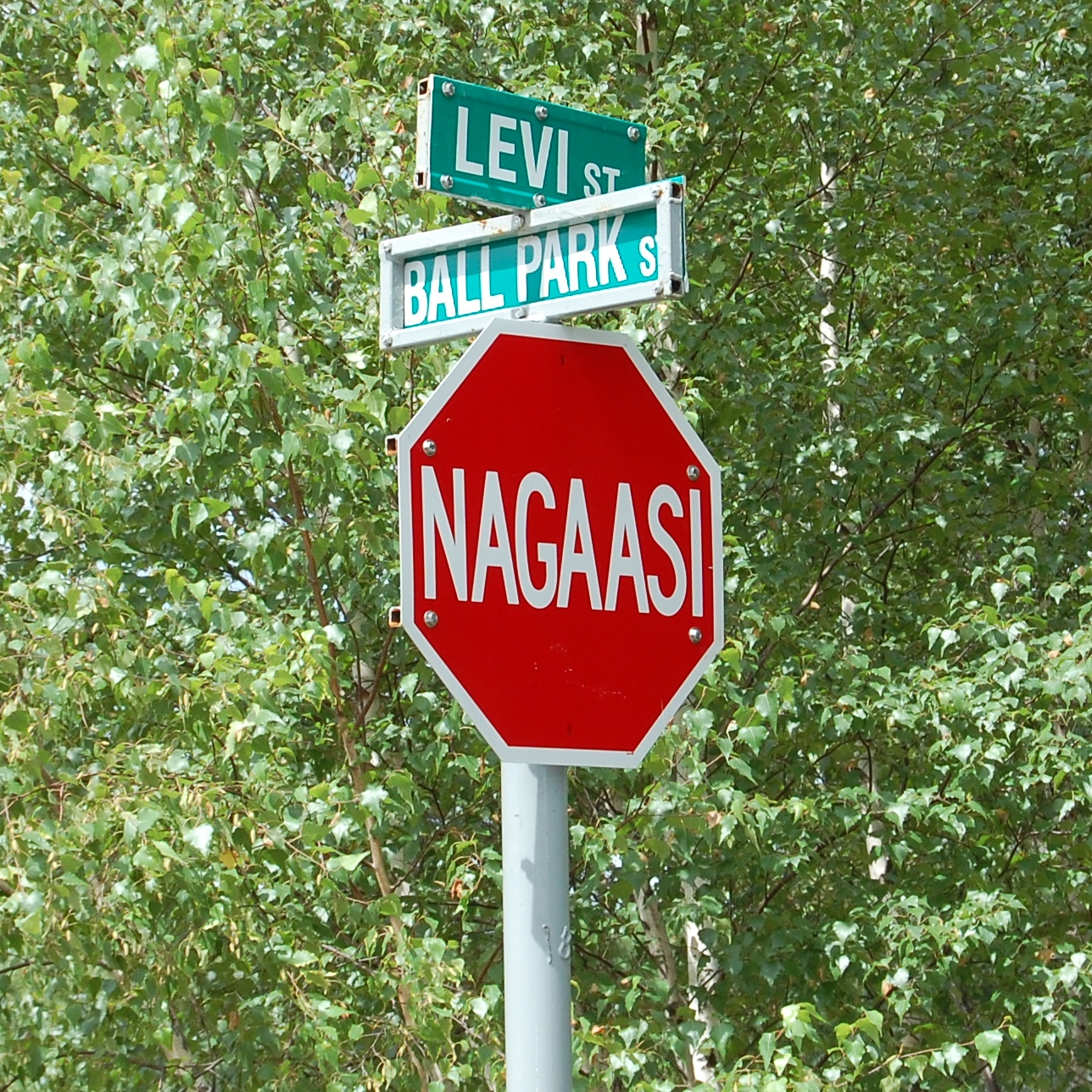
Mi'kmaq language stop sign in Elsipogtog First Nation, Canada, street names in English

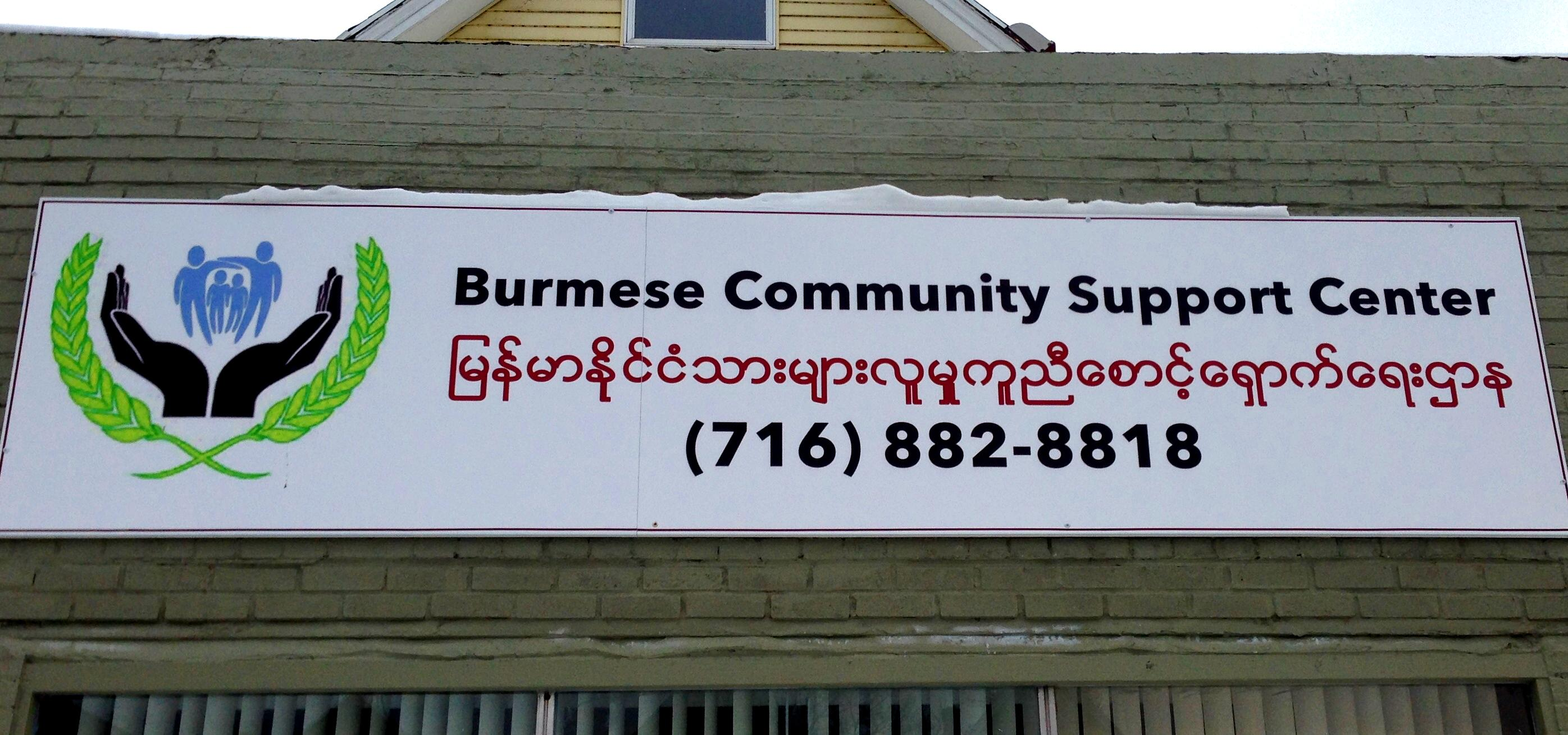
Sign on building for Burmese refugees in USA

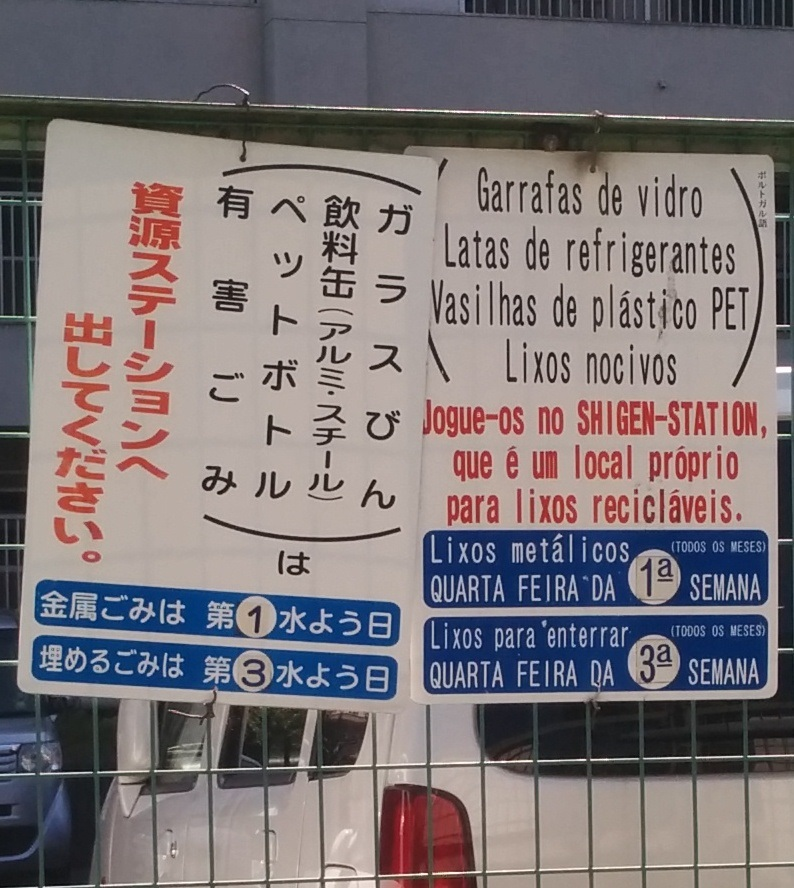
Signs in both Japanese and Portuguese in the Homi housing complex in the Homigaoka district of Toyota City, Japan, home to ethnic Japanese who have returned from Brazil

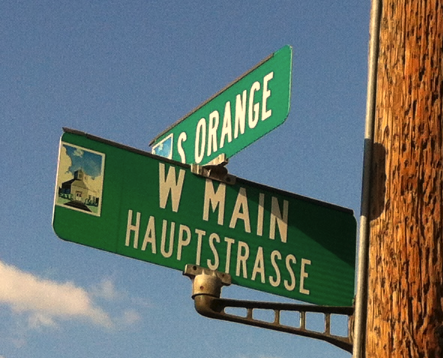
In Fredericksburg, Texas founded by Germans, using German image for tourism. German part of the sign only for a German aura.

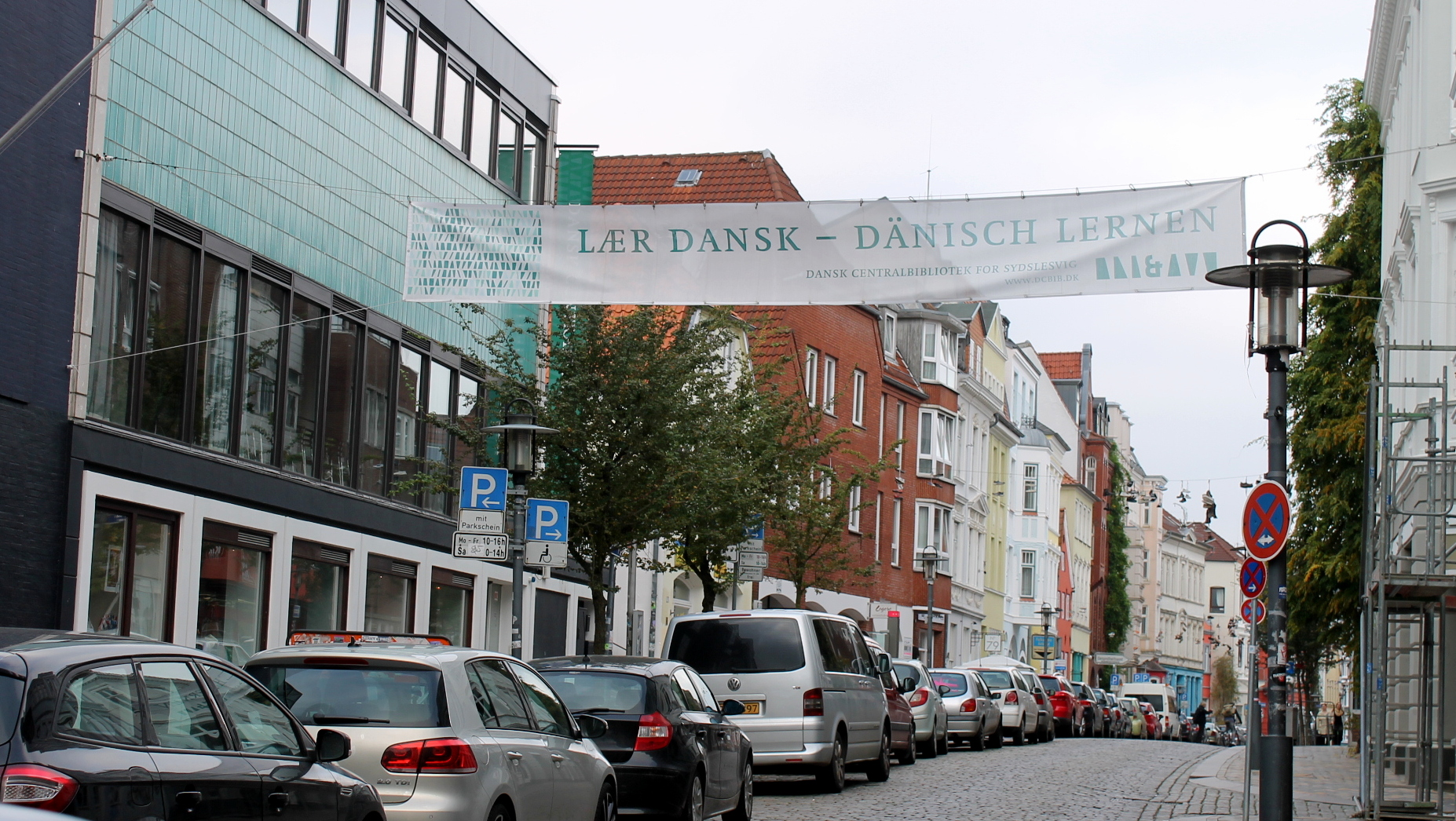
"Learn Danish" banner in Danish and German, in Flensburg, Germany where it is an officially recognised regional language.

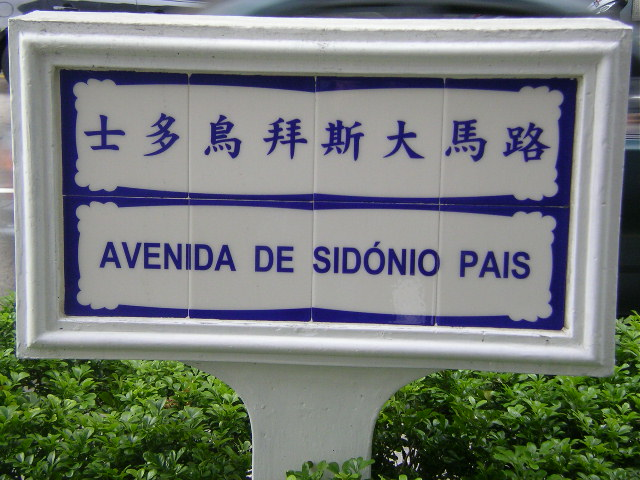
Sign in Macau with street name in both Chinese and Portuguese

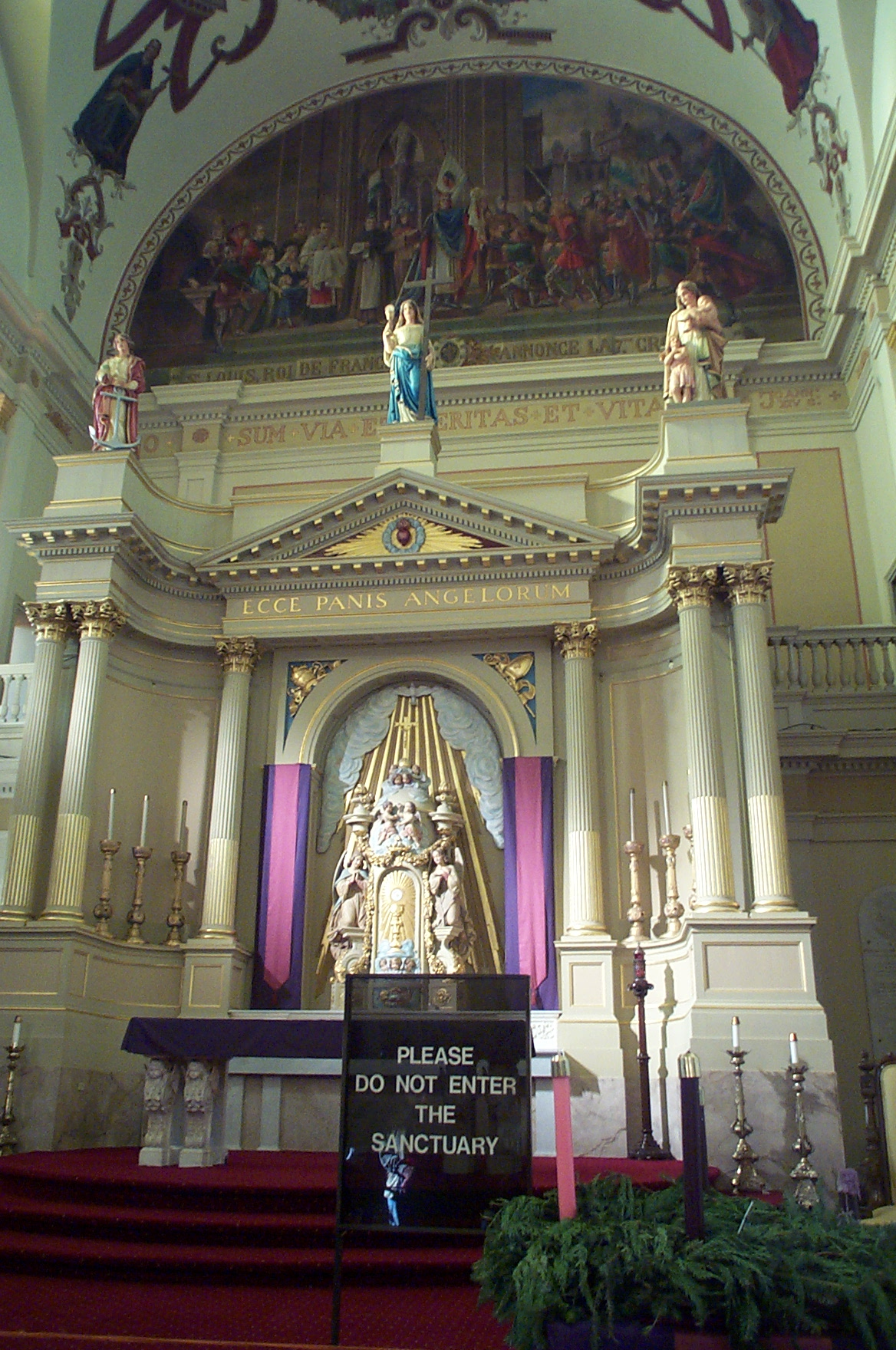
Latin on altar and wall of cathedral in USA. Understood by few, but seen as holier by some.

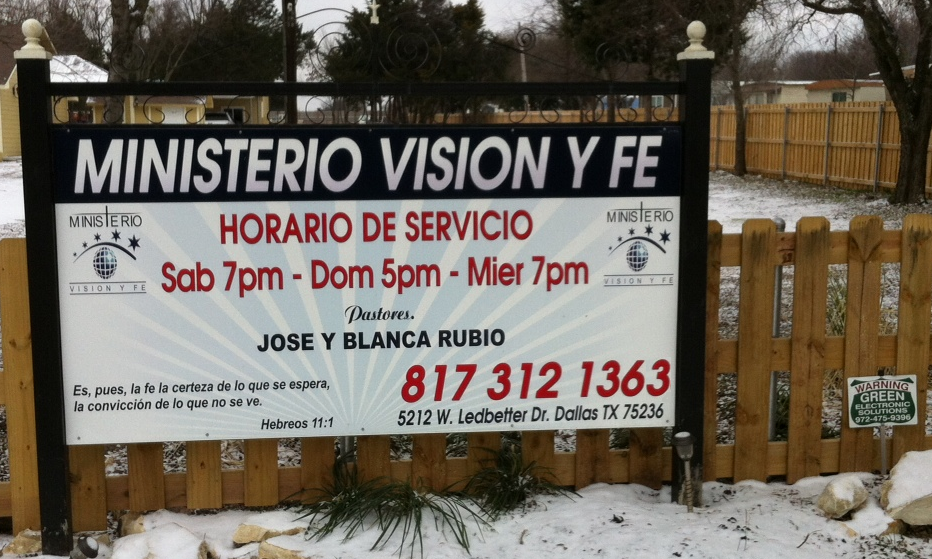
Sign specifically made for Spanish language church. Burglar alarm warning sign mass-produced, so English.

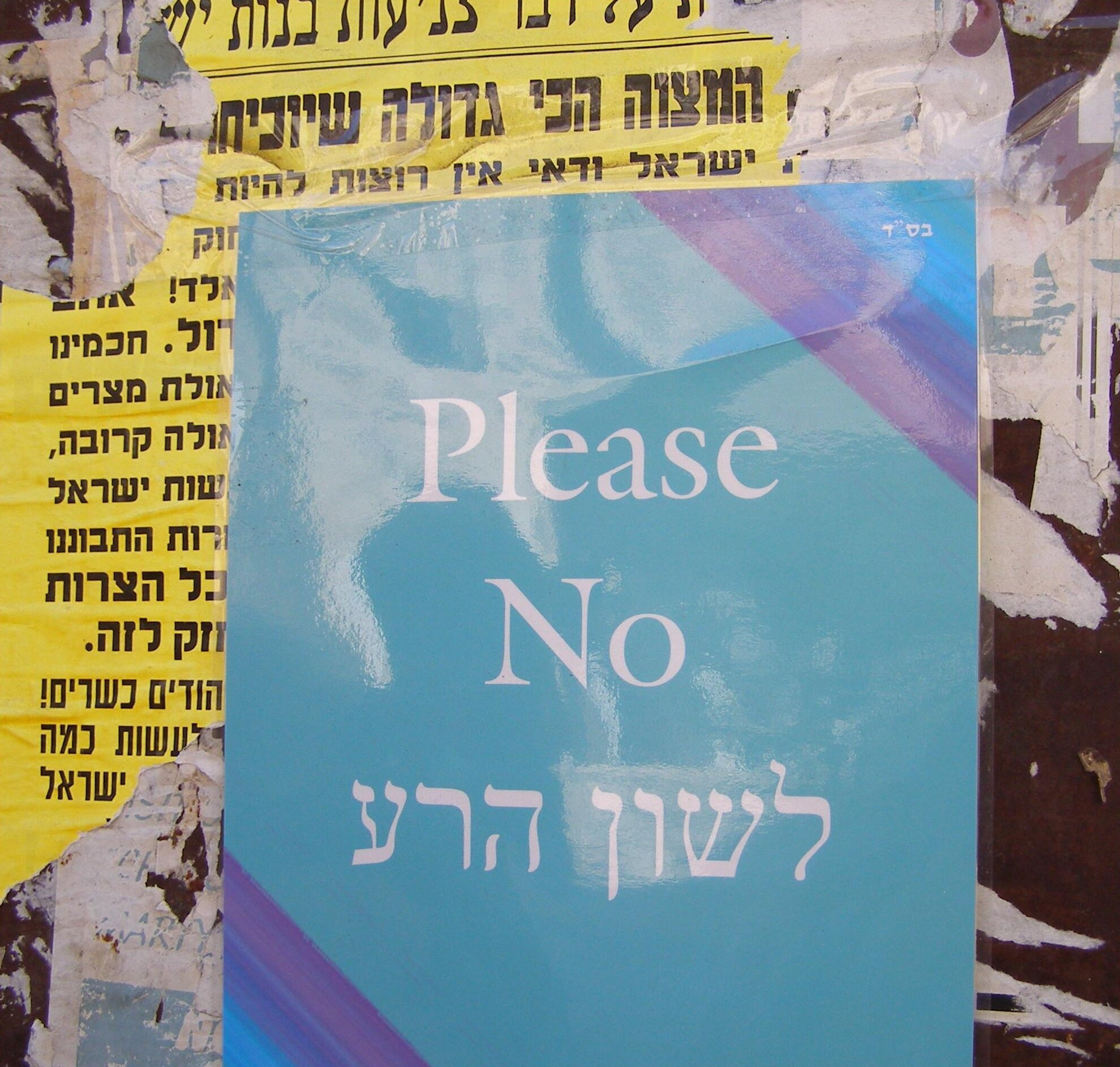
Sign in Jerusalem prohibiting slanderous speech

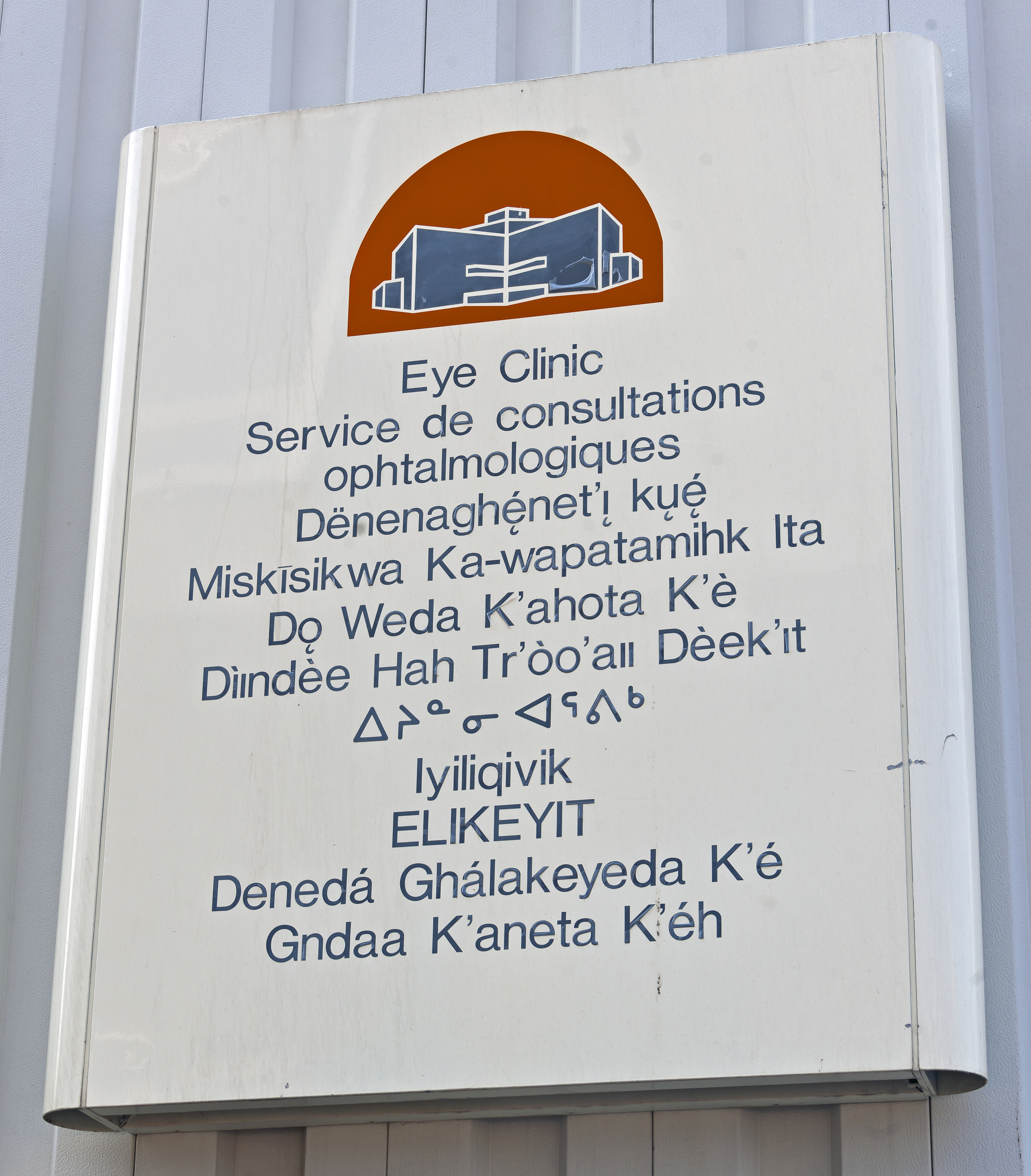
Sign for government-run eye clinic in Yellowknife, Canada, with all 11 official languages of the Northwest Territories

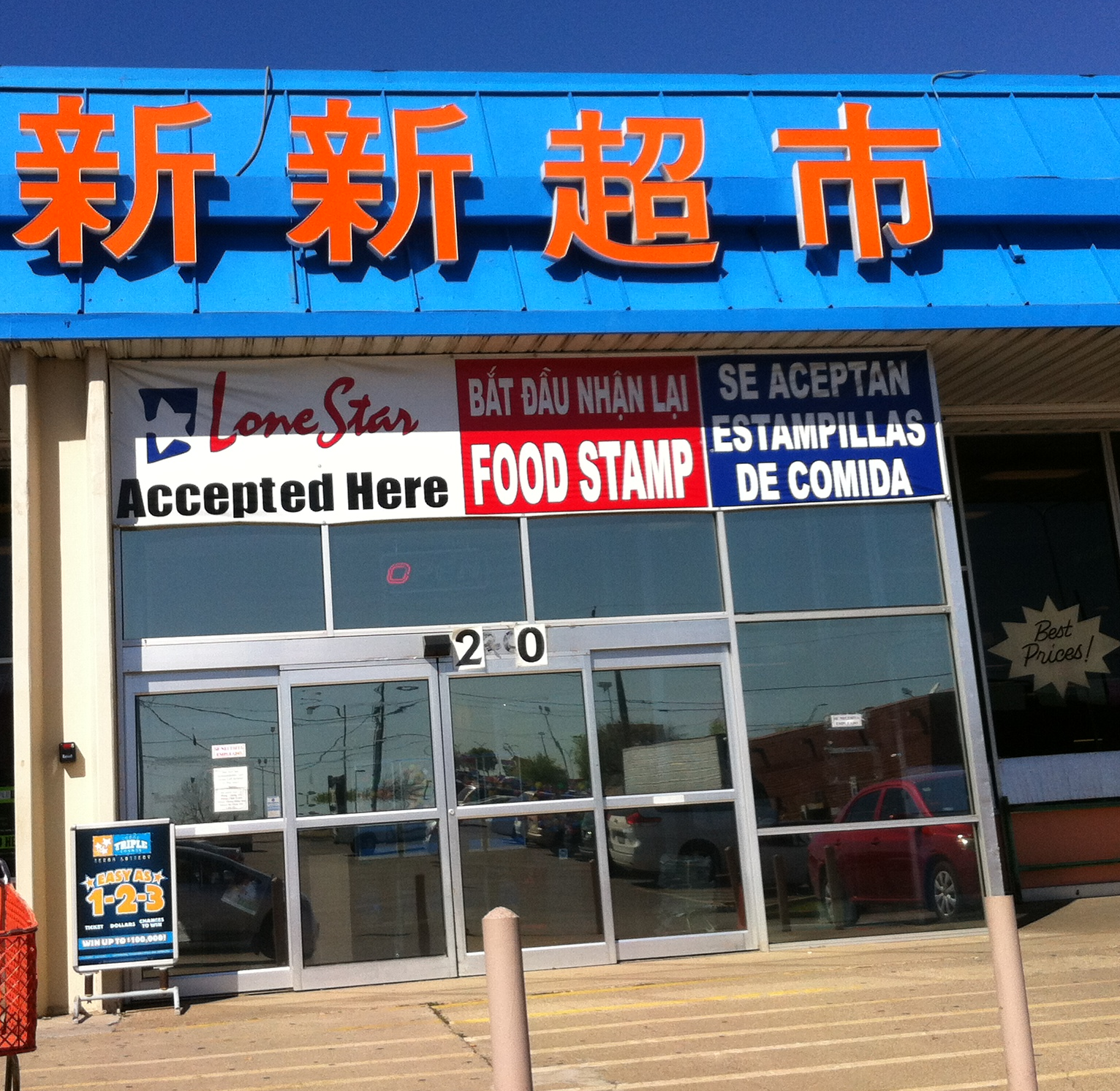
Multilingual signs at supermarket in Arlington, Texas. The area has many immigrants who speak Chinese, Vietnamese, or Spanish.

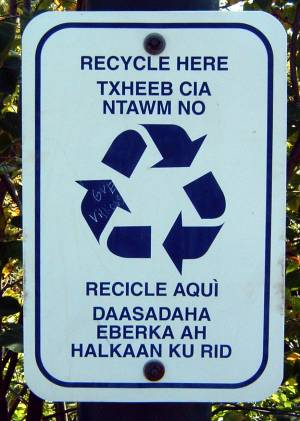
Recycling site labeled in English, Hmong, Spanish, and Somali in Minneapolis

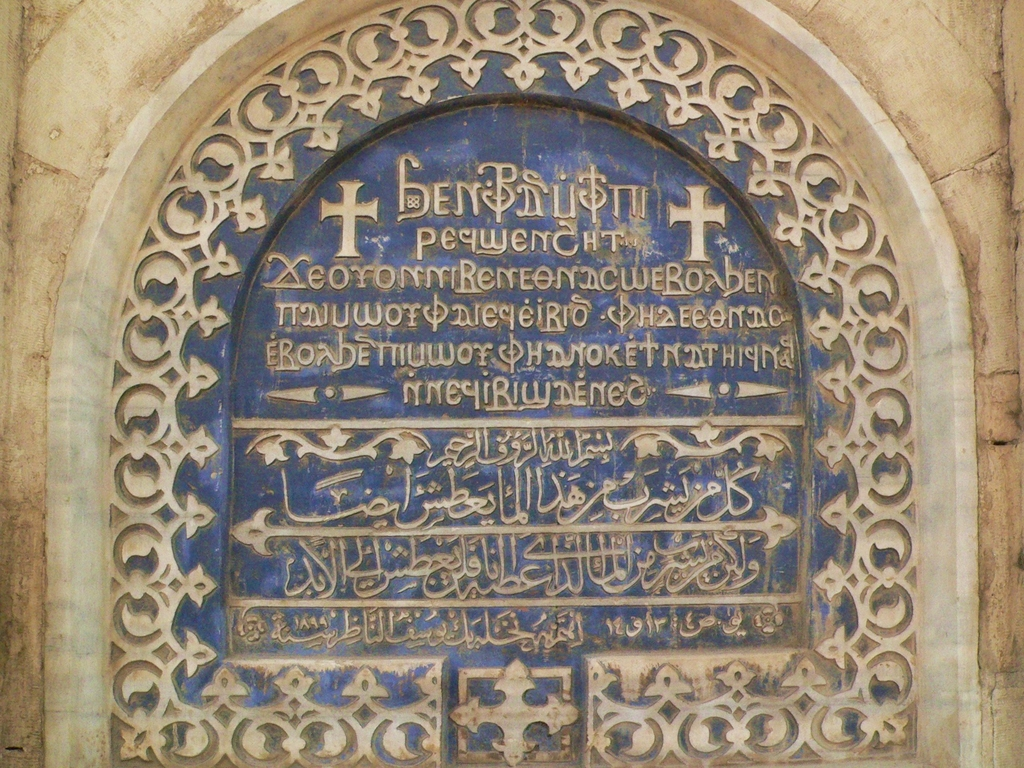
Coptic and Arabic inscription in old part of Cairo, from 1899

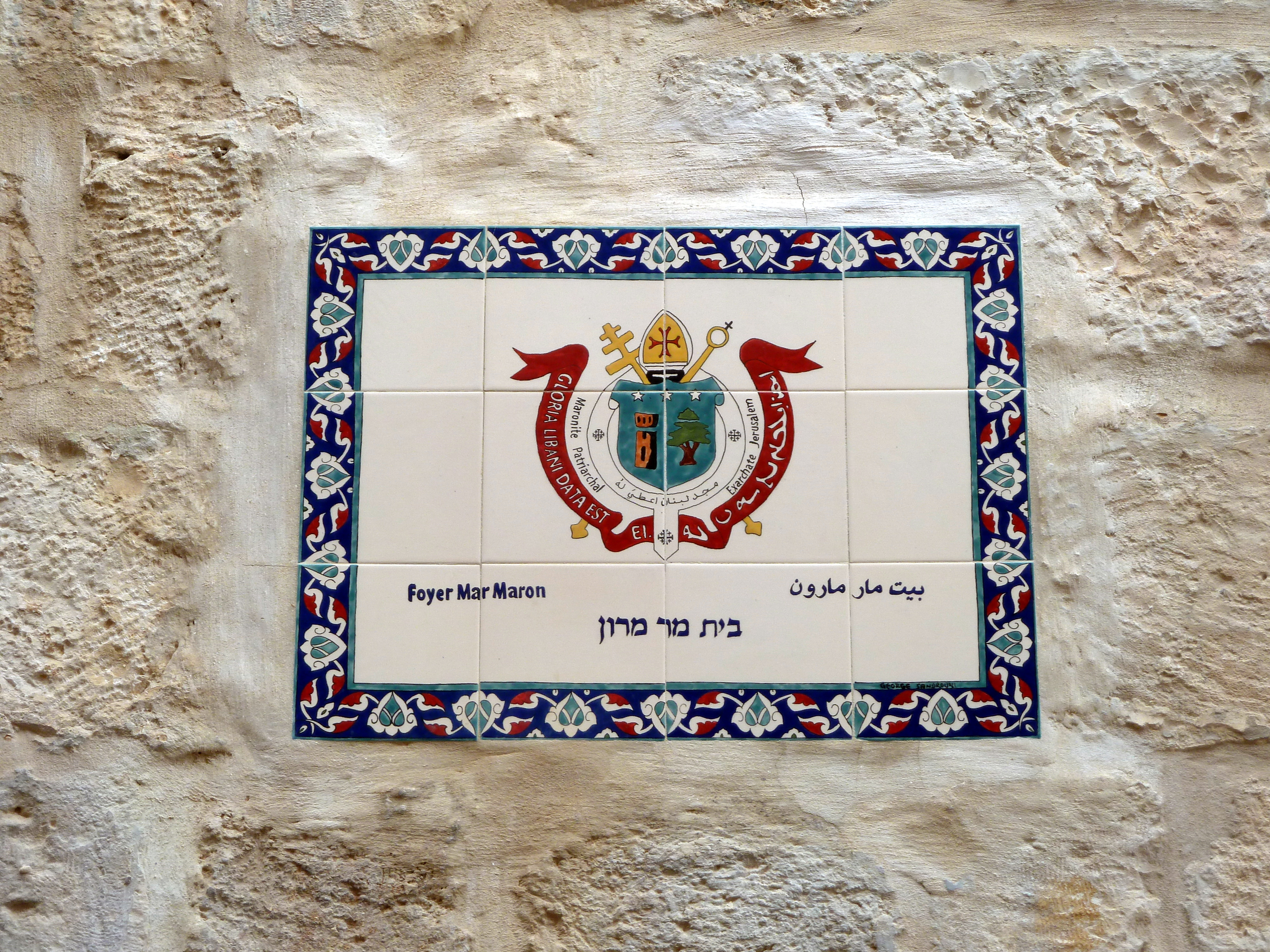
Maronite convent in Old Jerusalem: French, Latin, Arabic, Hebrew

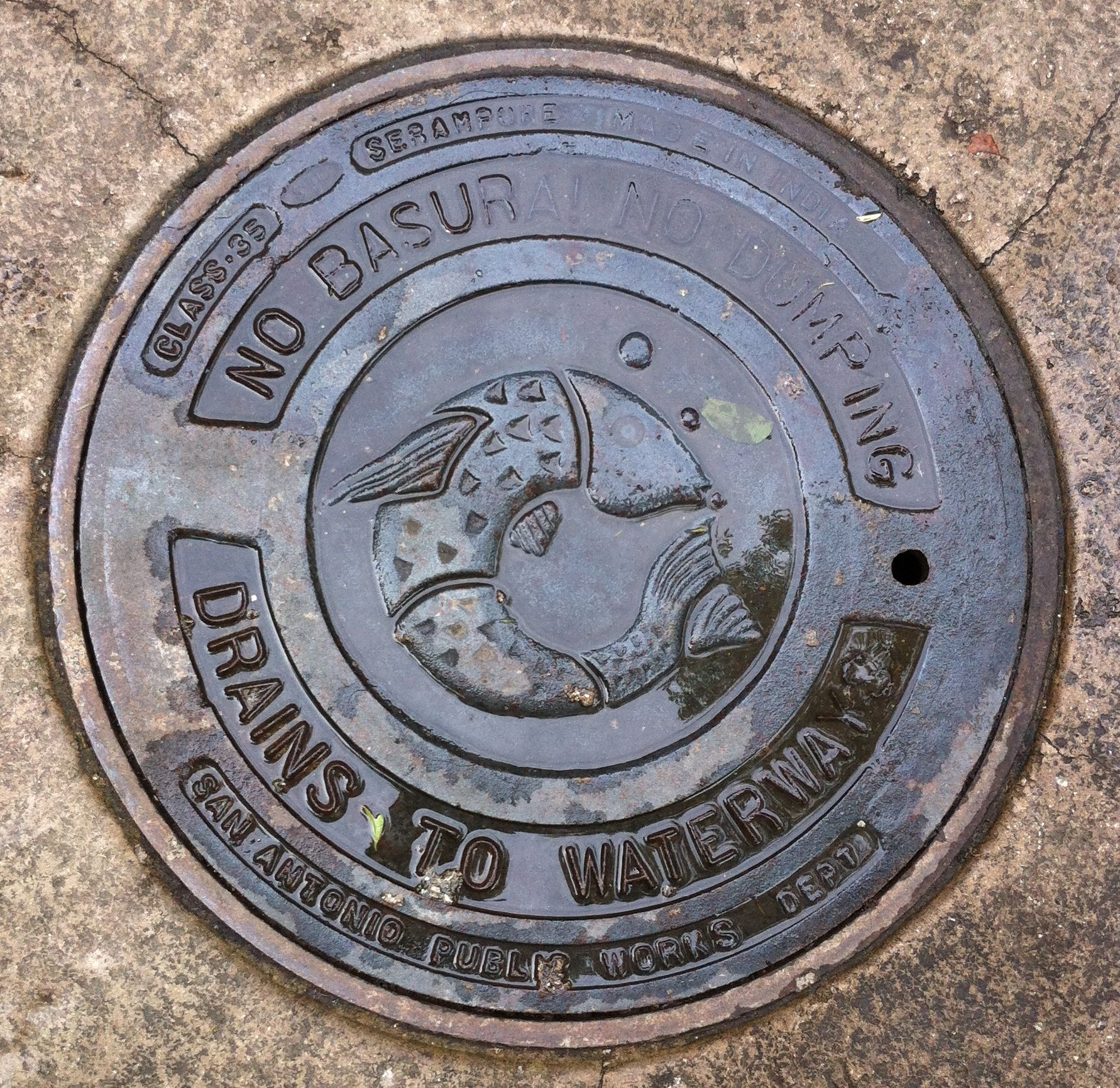
Manhole cover, San Antonio. English, except "No Basura!" ('No trash/waste!') in Spanish. "Made in India" in English

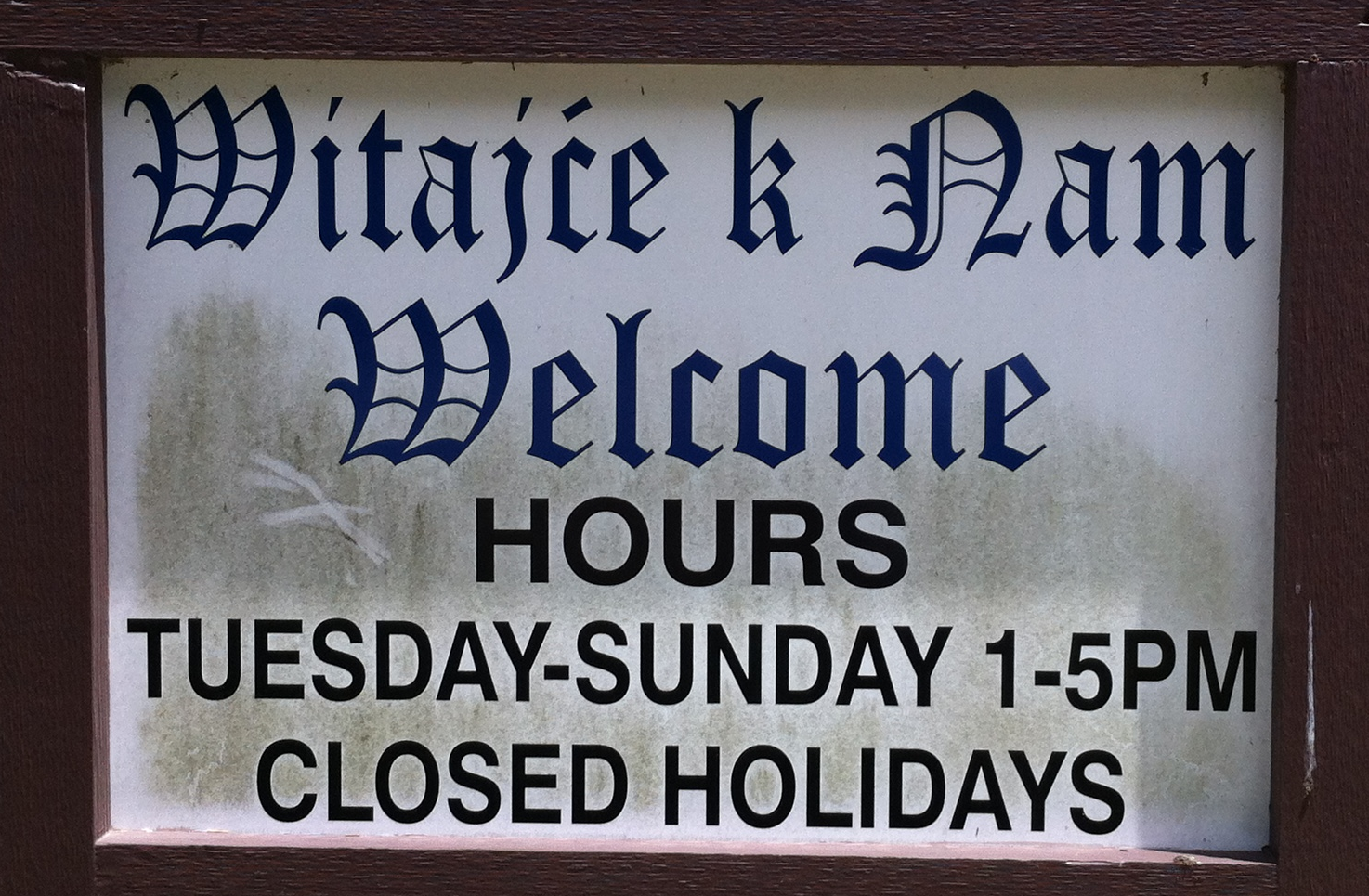
Wendish museum sign in Texas, welcoming visitors in both Wendish and English

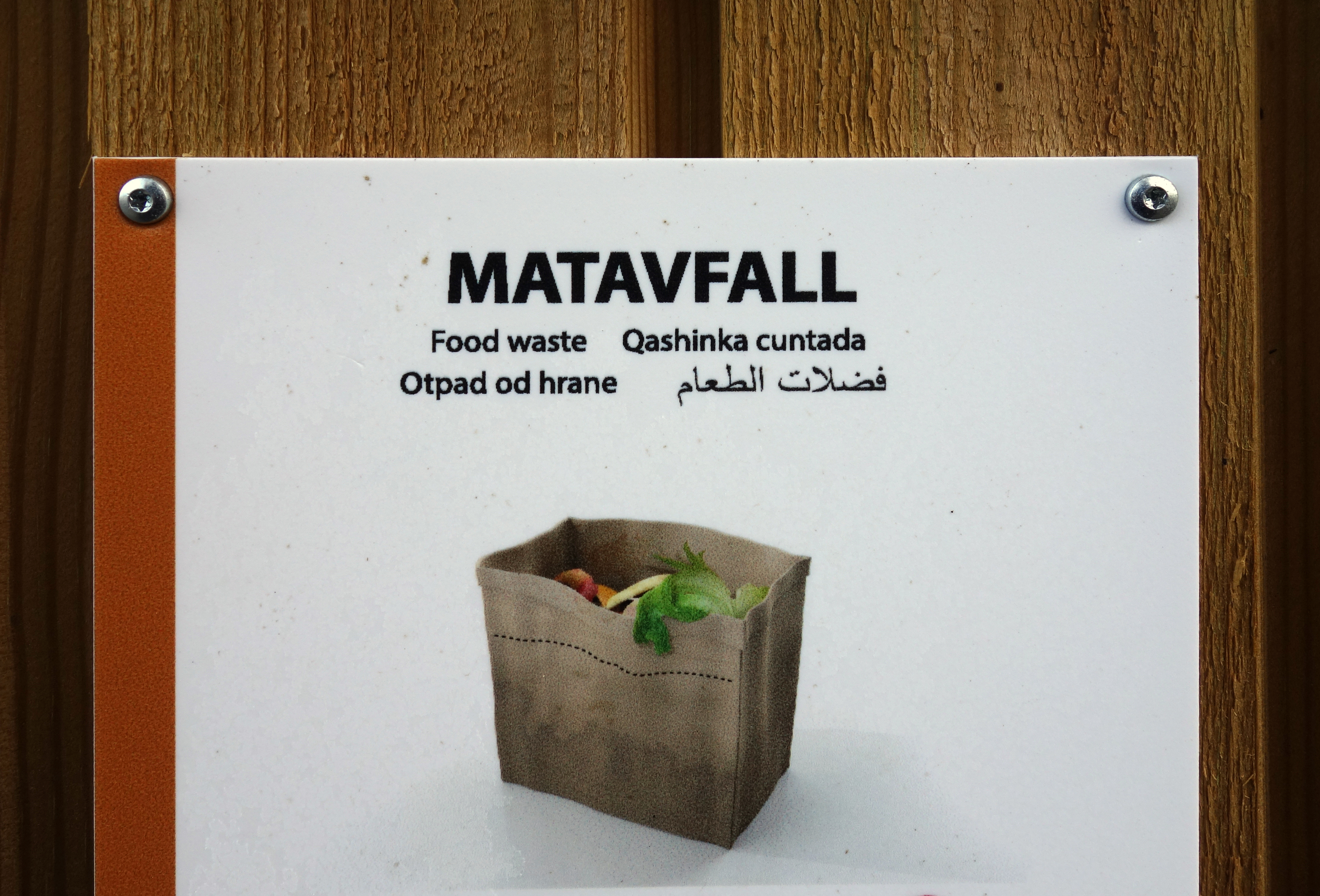
Swedish trash can sign with five languages, reflecting growing population of refugees from Middle East

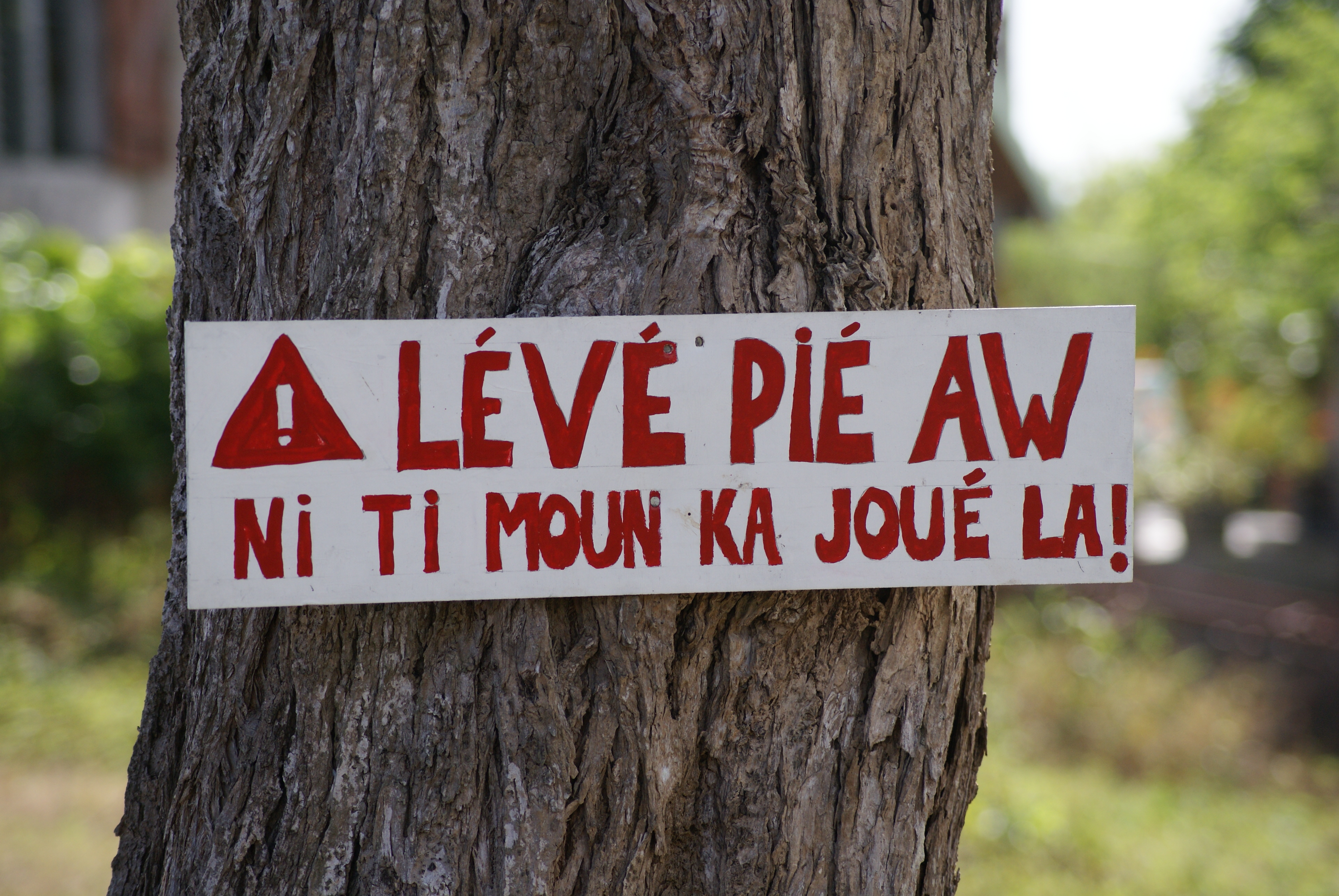
Though French is official on Martinique, sign is in Creole.

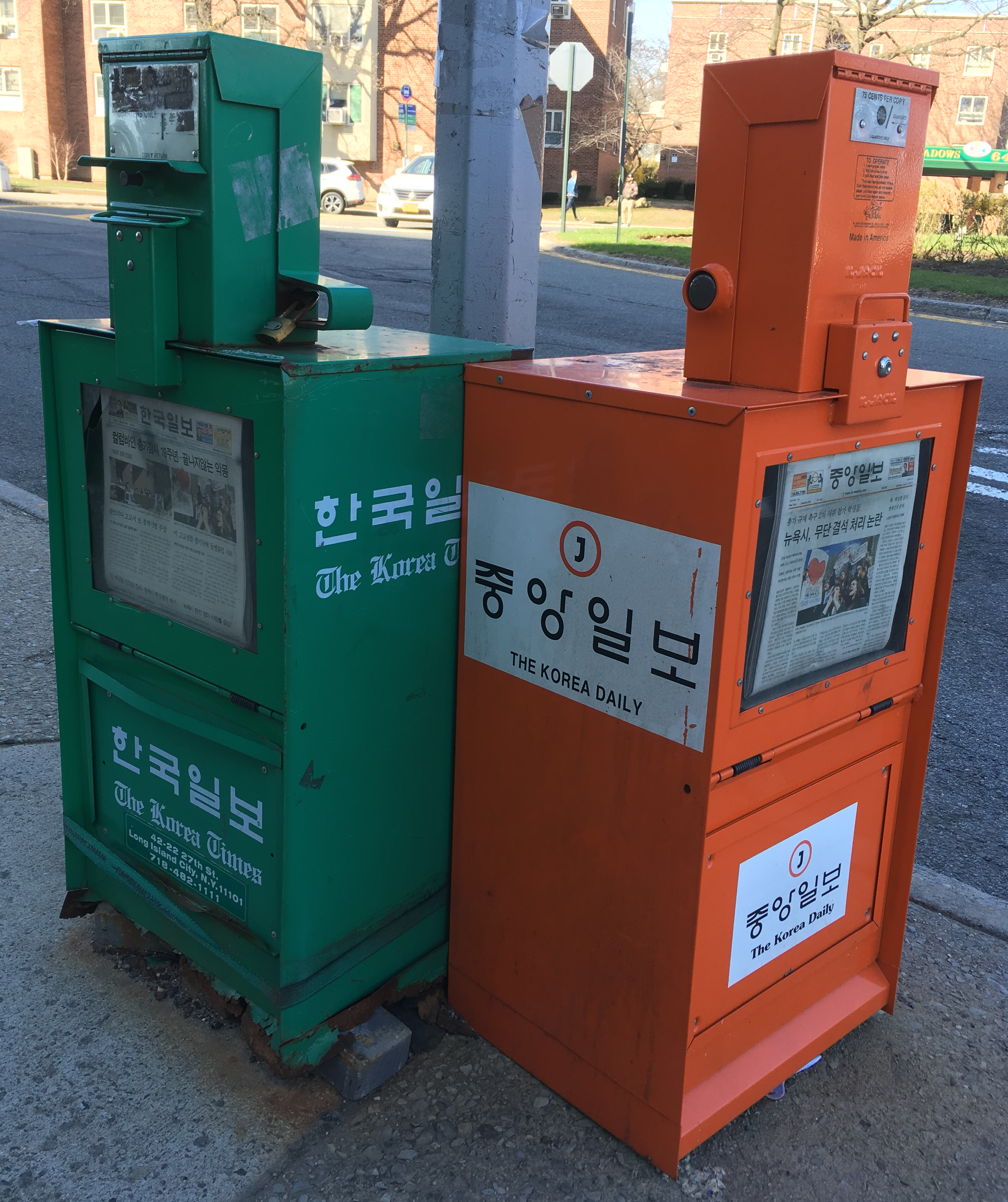
Korean newspaper machines, Fresh Meadows, NY, labeled in Korean & English.

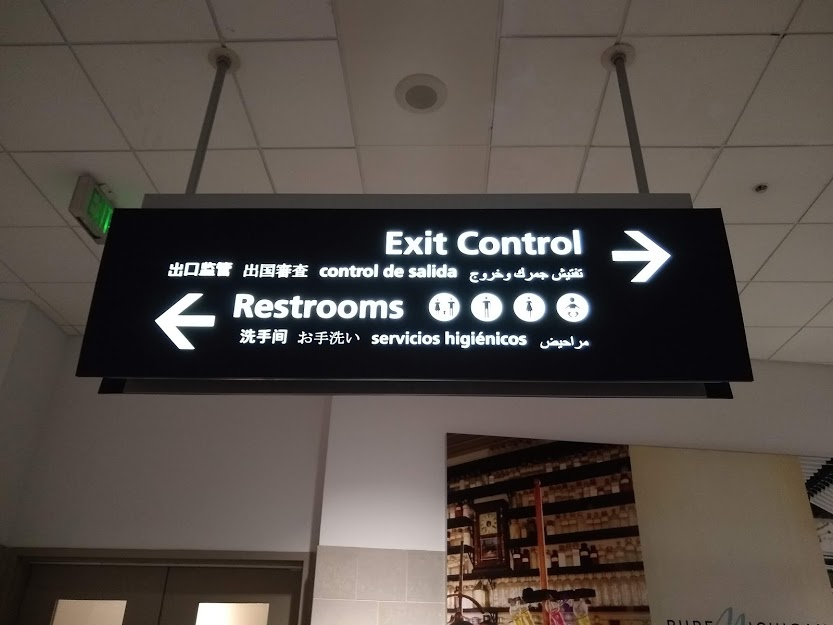
Sign in English, Chinese, Japanese, Spanish, and Arabic at Detroit Metropolitan Airport.

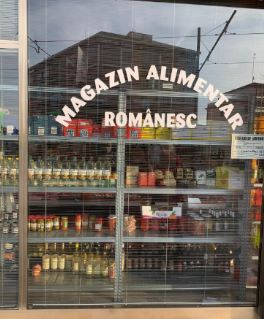
The Romanian shop in Arcella district in Padua, Italy. Arcella is known for its multicultural population.

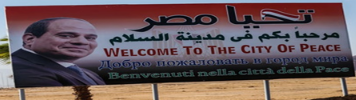
The four-language (Arabic, English, Russian, Italian) welcome board in Sharm el-Sheikh, Egypt. It has a nickname "The City of Peace" due to international peace conferences that had been held here, and now the nickname is being used to attract tourists.

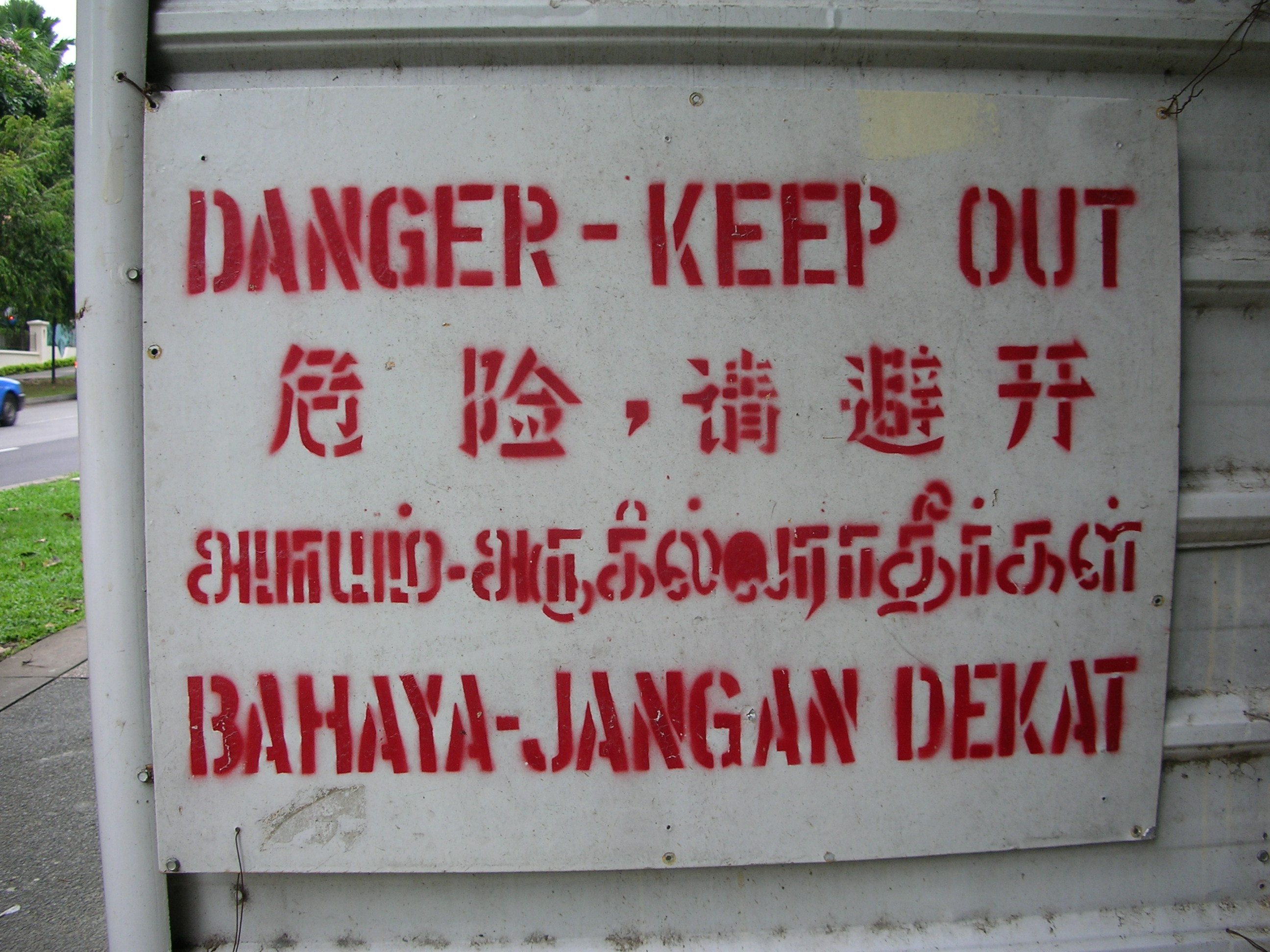
Construction warning sign written in four official languages of Singapore in English, Chinese, Malay and Tamil.

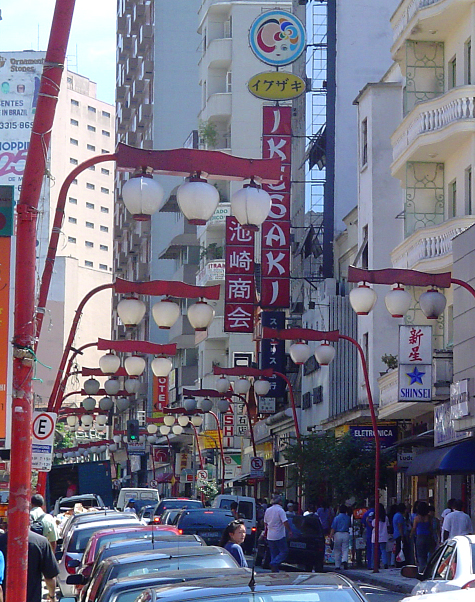
Japanese signs in a Japanese neighborhood in São Paulo, Brazil

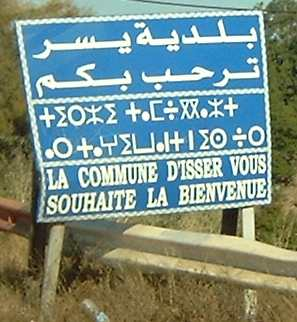
Trilingual and triscriptal sign in Algeria: Arabic, Berber (written in Tifinagh), French
