= 2017 Schleswig-Holstein state election =

German state election

- 7 May 2017

All 73 seats in the Landtag of Schleswig-Holstein 37 seats needed for a majority
- Turnout: 1,474,508 (64.2%) ▲4.0%
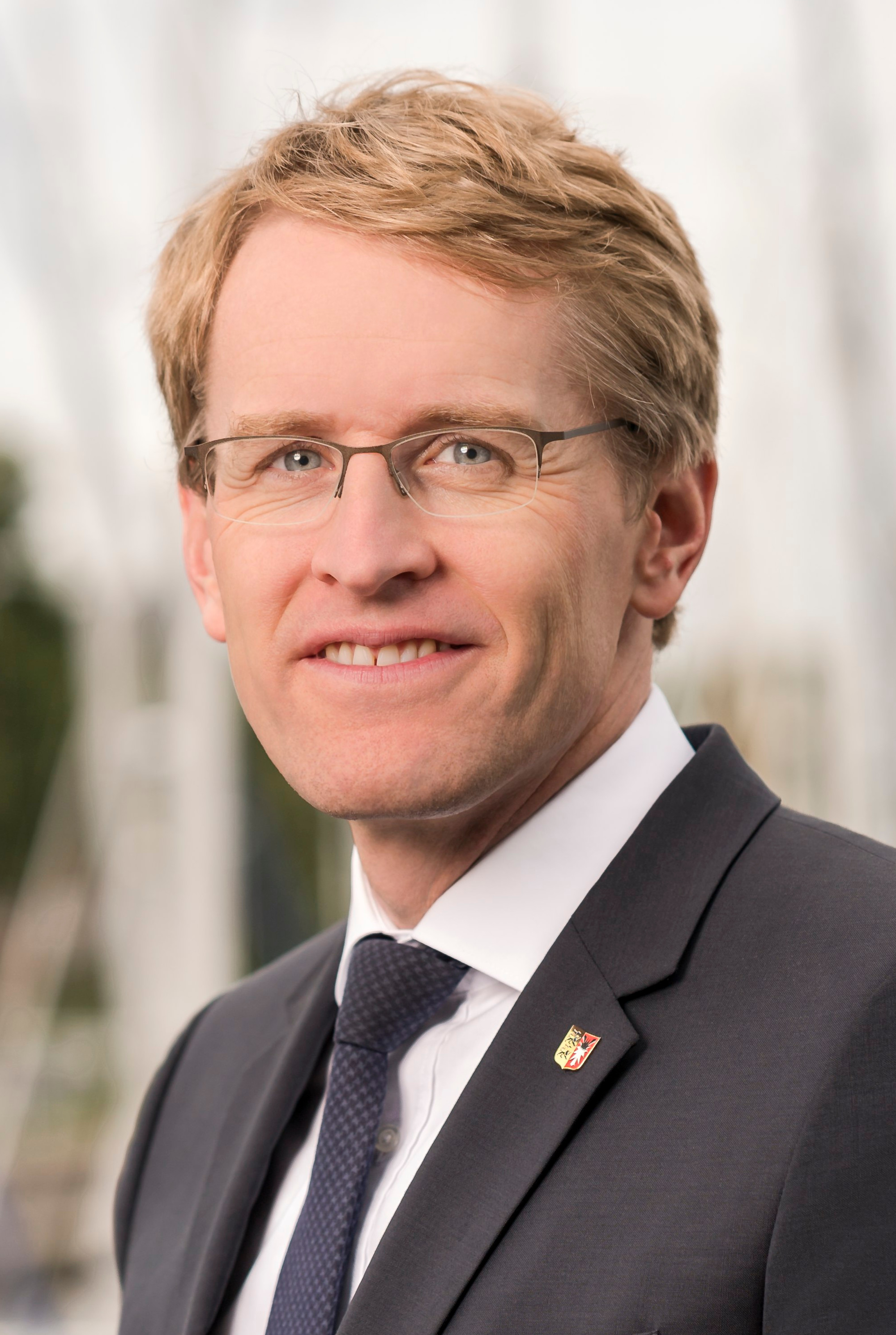

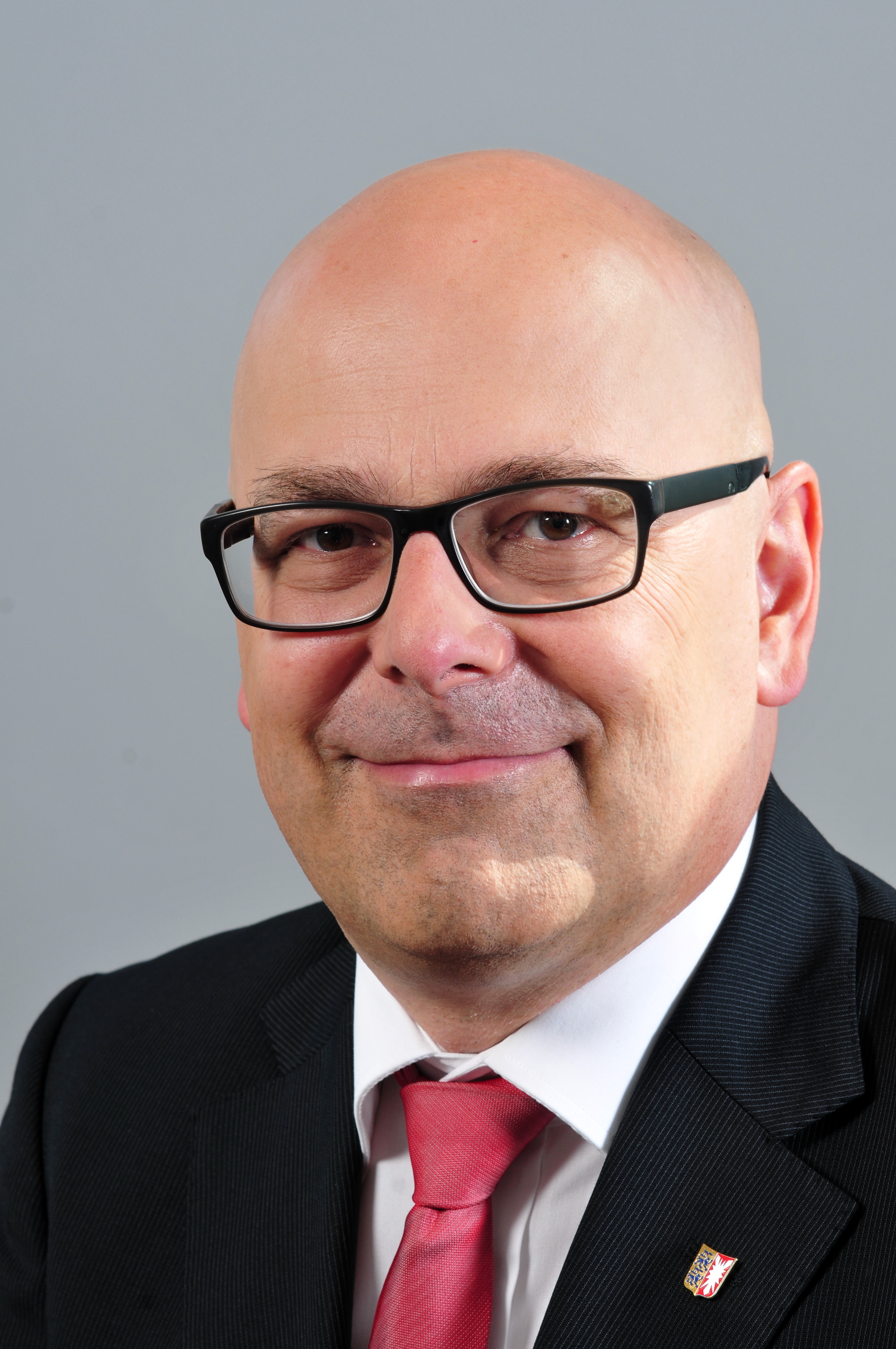

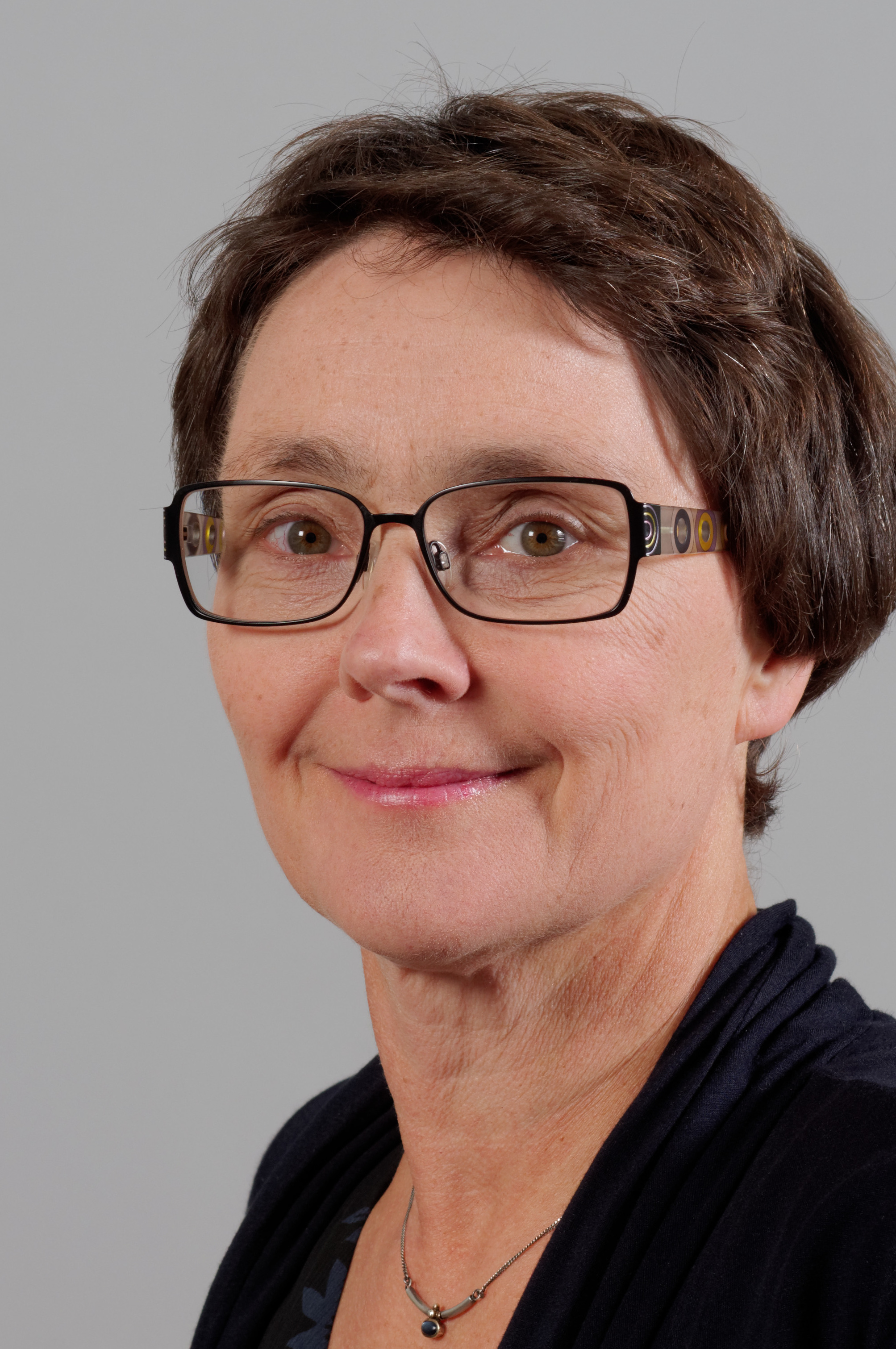

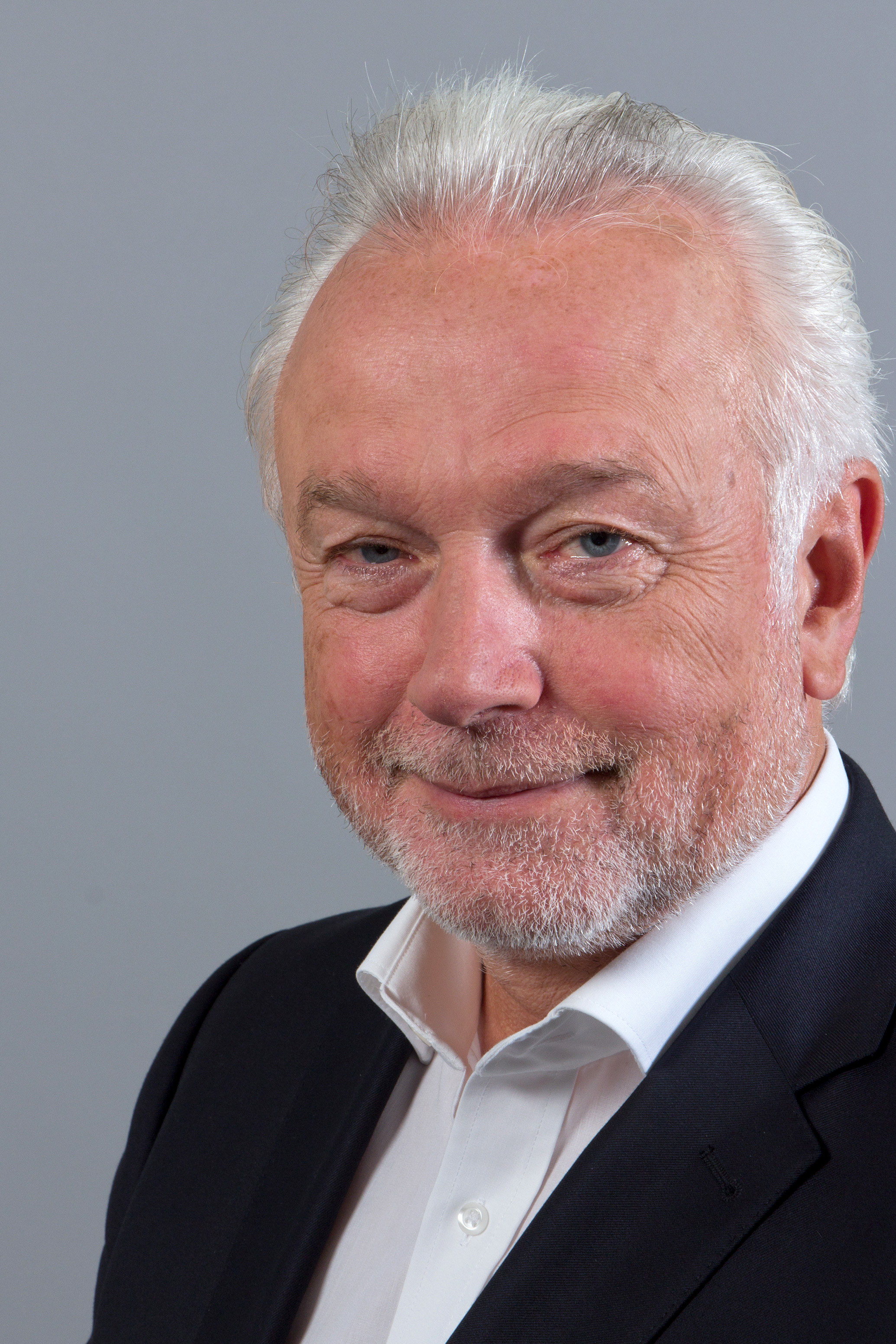

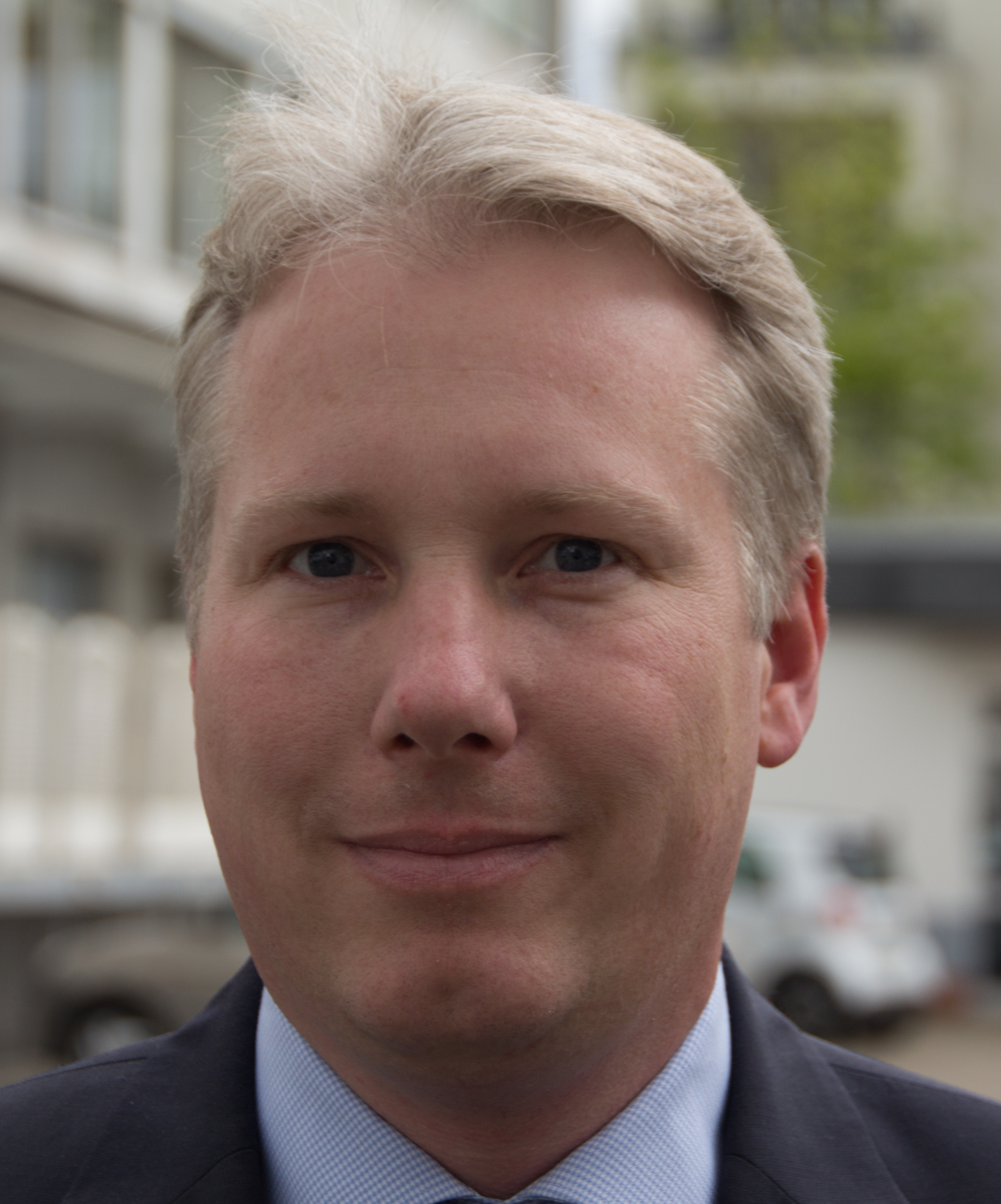

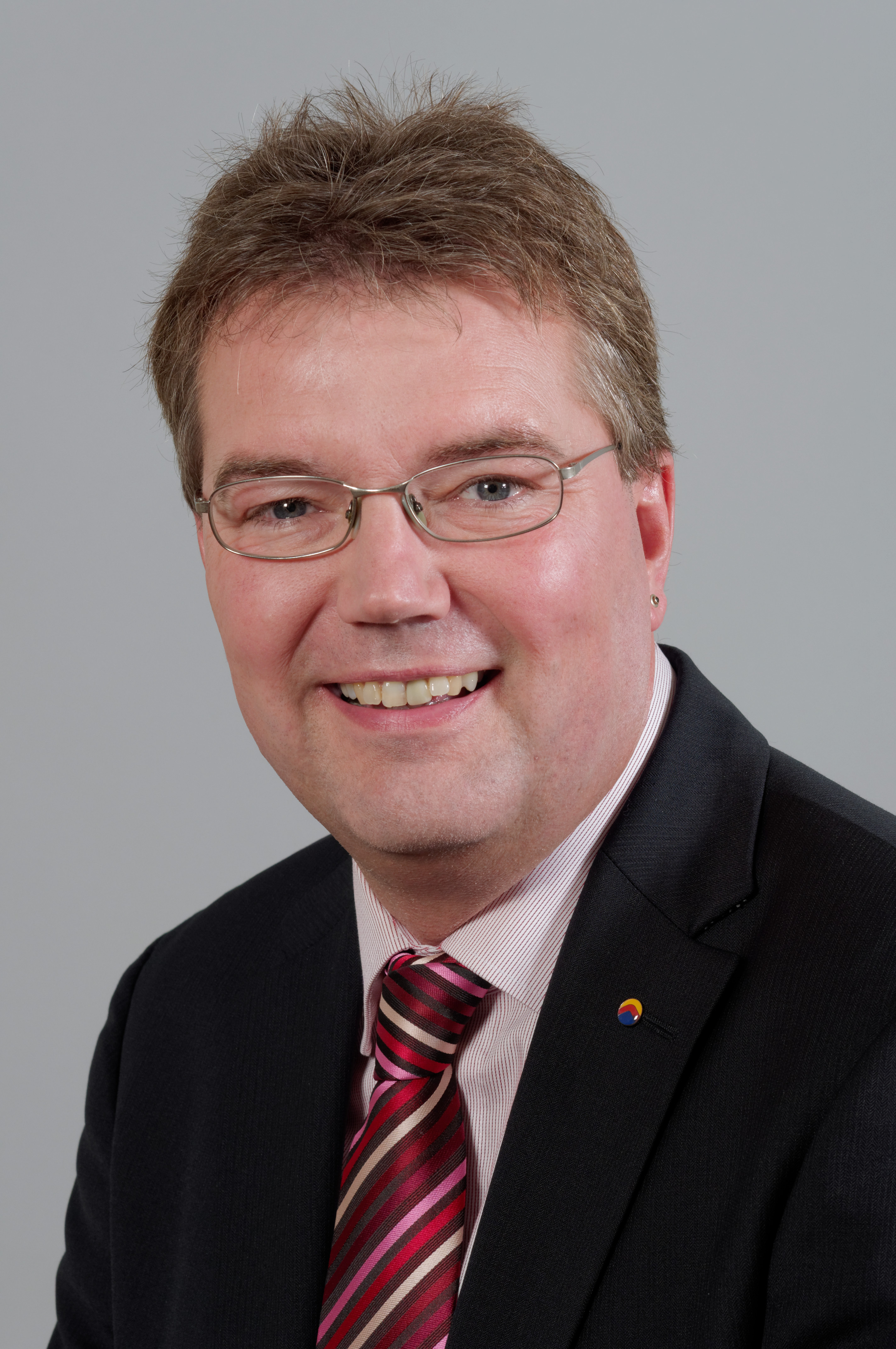

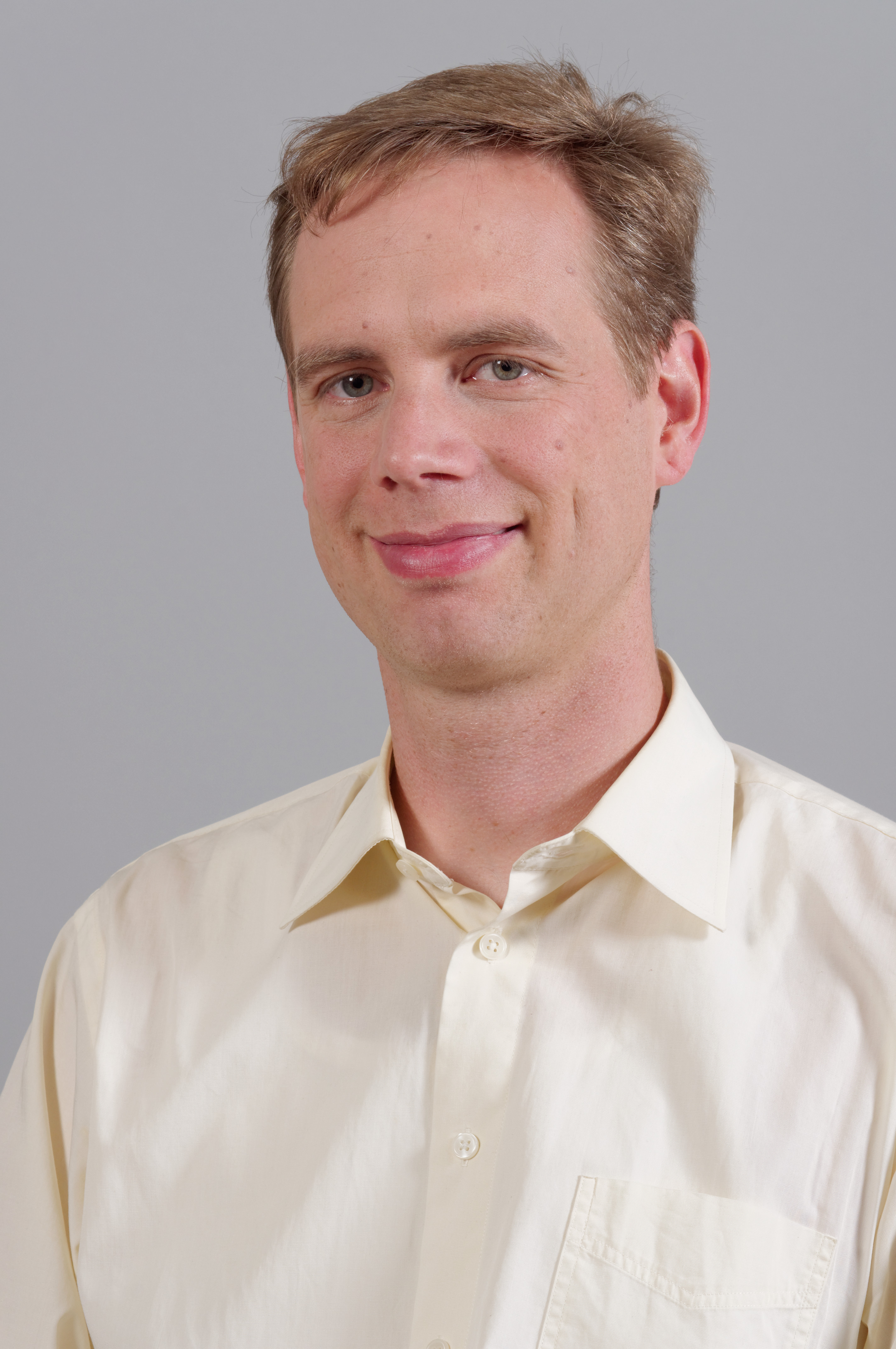
| | First party | Second party | Third party |
|---|---|---|---|
| Leader | Daniel Günther | Torsten Albig | Monika Heinold |
| Party | CDU | SPD | Greens |
| Last election | 22 seats, 30.8% | 22 seats, 30.4% | 10 seats, 13.2% |
| Seats won | 25 | 21 | 10 |
| Seat change | ▲3 | ▼1 | 0 |
| Popular vote | 471,460 | 401,806 | 190,181 |
| Percentage | 32.0% | 27.3% | 12.9% |
| Swing | ▲1.2% | ▼3.1% | ▼0.3% |
| | Fourth party | Fifth party | Sixth party |
| Leader | Wolfgang Kubicki | Jörg Nobis | Lars Harms |
| Party | FDP | AfD | SSW |
| Last election | 6 seats, 8.2% | Did not exist | 3 seats, 4.6% |
| Seats won | 9 | 5 | 3 |
| Seat change | ▲3 | ▲5 | 0 |
| Popular vote | 169,037 | 86,711 | 48,968 |
| Percentage | 11.5% | 5.9% | 3.3% |
| Swing | ▲3.3% | New party | ▼1.3% |
| | Seventh party |
| Leader | Patrick Breyer |
| Party | Pirates |
| Last election | 6 seats, 8.2% |
| Seats won | 0 |
| Seat change | ▼6 |
| Popular vote | 17,091 |
| Percentage | 1.2% |
| Swing | ▼7.0% |
- Results for the single-member constituencies
Government before election
Albig cabinet
SPD–Green–SSW
Government after election
Günther cabinet
CDU–Green–FDP

The 2017 Schleswig-Holstein state election was held on 7 May 2017 to elect the members of the Landtag of Schleswig-Holstein. The incumbent government was led by Minister-President Torsten Albig, and consisted of the Social Democratic Party (SPD), The Greens, and the South Schleswig Voters' Association (SSW). The government lost its majority in the election.

The result was a stalemate, with the incumbent left-wing government parties (SPD, Greens and SSW) being three seats short of a majority, and CDU and its usual coalition partner FDP also coming up three seats short due to the right-wing populist party Alternative for Germany (AfD) entering the Landtag. With no party willing to go into coalition with them, it necessitated cross-aisle cooperation.

FDP leader Wolfgang Kubicki ruled out a traffic light coalition (SPD-Greens-FDP), whilst CDU leader Daniel Günther ruled out a Grand coalition (CDU-SPD). The Christian Democratic Union (CDU) subsequently formed a Jamaica coalition with the Free Democratic Party (FDP) and Greens. Günther was elected Minister-President by the Landtag, and Günther cabinet was sworn into office.

== Parties ==
The table below lists parties represented in the previous Landtag of Schleswig-Holstein.

| Name | | Ideology | Leader(s) | 2012 result | |
| Name | | Ideology | Leader(s) | Votes (%) | Seats |
|---|---|---|---|---|---|
| CDU | Christian Democratic Union of Germany; Christlich Demokratische Union Deutschlands | Christian democracy | Daniel Günther | 30.8% | 22 / 69 |
| SPD | Social Democratic Party of Germany; Sozialdemokratische Partei Deutschlands | Social democracy | Torsten Albig | 30.4% | 22 / 69 |
| Grüne | Alliance 90/The Greens; Bündnis 90/Die Grünen | Green politics | Monika Heinold | 13.2% | 10 / 69 |
| FDP | Free Democratic Party; Freie Demokratische Partei | Classical liberalism | Wolfgang Kubicki | 8.2% | 6 / 69 |
| Piraten | Pirate Party Germany; Piratenpartei Deutschland | Pirate politics | Patrick Breyer | 8.2% | 6 / 69 |
| SSW | South Schleswig Voters' Association; Südschleswigscher Wählerverband | Danish and Frisian minority interests | Lars Harms | 4.6% | 3 / 69 |

== Opinion polling ==
| Polling firm | Fieldwork date | Sample size | CDU | SPD | Grüne | FDP | Piraten | SSW | Linke | AfD | Others | Lead |
|---|---|---|---|---|---|---|---|---|---|---|---|---|
| 2017 state election | 7 May 2017 | – | 32.0 | 27.3 | 12.9 | 11.5 | 1.2 | 3.3 | 3.8 | 5.9 | 2.3 | 4.7 |
| Forschungsgruppe Wahlen | 2–4 May 2017 | 1,814 | 32 | 29 | 12 | 11 | – | 3 | 4.5 | 6 | 2.5 | 3 |
| INSA | 26–28 Apr 2017 | 1,004 | 33 | 29 | 12 | 10 | – | 4 | 5 | 5 | 2 | 4 |
| Infratest dimap | 25–26 Apr 2017 | 1,003 | 32 | 31 | 12 | 8.5 | – | 3 | 4.5 | 6 | 3 | 1 |
| Forschungsgruppe Wahlen | 24–26 Apr 2017 | 1,001 | 32 | 30 | 12 | 9 | – | 3 | 5 | 6 | 3 | 2 |
| Infratest dimap | 18–19 Apr 2017 | 1,002 | 31 | 33 | 12 | 9 | – | 3 | 4 | 5 | 3 | 2 |
| Infratest dimap | 30 Mar–4 Apr 2017 | 1,002 | 30 | 33 | 12 | 9 | – | 3 | 4 | 7 | 2 | 3 |
| Infratest dimap | 9–14 Mar 2017 | 1,000 | 27 | 33 | 14 | 9 | – | 3 | 4 | 7 | 3 | 6 |
| Infratest dimap | 2–6 Dec 2016 | 1,001 | 34 | 26 | 15 | 9 | – | 3 | 5 | 6 | 2 | 8 |
| INSA | 6–14 Oct 2016 | 1,000 | 26 | 31 | 13 | 12 | 1 | 4 | 4 | 6 | 3 | 5 |
| Forsa | 6–12 Apr 2016 | 1,001 | 28 | 28 | 16 | 9 | 1 | 4 | 3 | 9 | 2 | Tie |
| Infratest dimap | 27–29 Oct 2014 | 1,002 | 34 | 29 | 15 | 3 | 2 | 3 | 5 | 7 | 2 | 5 |
| Infratest dimap | 2–5 May 2013 | 1,003 | 34 | 31 | 15 | 6 | 3 | 4 | 3 | – | 4 | 3 |
| 2012 state election | 6 May 2012 | – | 30.8 | 30.4 | 13.2 | 8.2 | 8.2 | 4.6 | 2.3 | – | 2.4 | 0.4 |

== Election result ==
Summary of the 7 May 2017 election results for the Landtag of Schleswig-Holstein
| Party | Votes | % | +/- | Seats | +/- | Seats % |
|---|---|---|---|---|---|---|
| Christian Democratic Union (CDU) | 471,460 | 32.0 | ▲1.2 | 25 | ▲3 | 34.2 |
| Social Democratic Party (SPD) | 401,806 | 27.3 | ▼3.1 | 21 | ▼1 | 28.8 |
| Alliance 90/The Greens (Grüne) | 190,181 | 12.9 | ▼0.3 | 10 | 0 | 13.7 |
| Free Democratic Party (FDP) | 169,037 | 11.5 | ▲3.3 | 9 | ▲3 | 12.3 |
| Alternative for Germany (AfD) | 86,711 | 5.9 | New | 5 | New | 6.8 |
| South Schleswig Voters' Association (SSW) | 48,968 | 3.3 | ▼1.3 | 3 | 0 | 4.1 |
| The Left (Linke) | 56,018 | 3.8 | ▲1.5 | 0 | ±0 | 0 |
| Pirate Party Germany (Piraten) | 17,091 | 1.2 | ▼7.0 | 0 | ▼6 | 0 |
| Others | 33,236 | 2.3 | | 0 | ±0 | 0 |
| Total | 1,474,508 | 100.0 | | 73 | ▲4 | |
| Voter turnout | | 64.2 | ▲4.0 | | | |

Popular Vote
| CDU | 31.97% |
| SPD | 27.25% |
| B'90/GRÜNE | 12.90% |
| FDP | 11.46% |
| AfD | 5.88% |
| DIE LINKE | 3.80% |
| SSW | 3.32% |
| PIRATEN | 1.16% |
| Other | 2.25% |

Landtag seats
| CDU | 34.35% |
| SPD | 28.77% |
| B'90/GRÜNE | 13.70% |
| FDP | 12.33% |
| AfD | 6.85% |
| SSW | 4.11% |

=== Results by constituency ===
First votes ("Erststimmen") by constituency

| Constituency ("Wahlkreis") | CDU | SPD | Grüne | FDP | AfD | SSW | Linke | Others | Lead | Elected candidate |
|---|---|---|---|---|---|---|---|---|---|---|
| Dithmarschen-Schleswig | 44.6 | 28.0 | 7.1 | 7.4 | 4.9 | 3.7 | 2.8 | 1.4 | 16.6 | Andreas Hein |
| Dithmarschen-Süd | 40.5 | 29.7 | 5.8 | 13.3 | 5.4 | 0.0 | 3.1 | 2.1 | 10.8 | Volker Nielsen |
| Eckernförde | 43.2 | 26.7 | 8.4 | 9.1 | 3.6 | 3.1 | 2.4 | 1.0 | 16.5 | Daniel Günther |
| Elmshorn | 35.6 | 37.6 | 8.5 | 6.9 | 5.8 | 0.0 | 4.0 | 1.5 | 2.0 | Beate Raudies |
| Flensburg | 26.2 | 31.6 | 12.0 | 7.9 | 0.0 | 12.4 | 6.7 | 2.3 | 5.4 | Heiner Dunckel |
| Flensburg-Land | 39.7 | 27.4 | 8.6 | 5.1 | 3.5 | 10.9 | 2.8 | 2.0 | 12.3 | Petra Nicolaisen |
| Kiel-Nord | 29.4 | 37.9 | 13.0 | 6.6 | 3.7 | 2.1 | 4.3 | 2.9 | 8.5 | Torsten Albig |
| Kiel-Ost | 27.8 | 40.4 | 9.0 | 6.4 | 0.0 | 4.0 | 6.8 | 5.6 | 12.6 | Bernd Heinemann |
| Kiel-West | 27.8 | 36.6 | 13.2 | 6.0 | 4.4 | 2.9 | 5.1 | 4.0 | 8.8 | Özlem Ünsal |
| Lauenburg-Nord | 39.5 | 31.3 | 8.4 | 7.7 | 6.5 | 0.0 | 3.0 | 3.6 | 8.2 | Klaus Schlie |
| Lauenburg-Süd | 35.6 | 36.0 | 7.8 | 8.1 | 7.7 | 0.0 | 3.4 | 1.4 | 0.4 | Kathrin Wagner-Bockey |
| Lübeck-Ost | 34.5 | 37.1 | 8.4 | 5.9 | 6.7 | 0.0 | 4.2 | 3.2 | 2.6 | Thomas Rother |
| Lübeck-Süd | 30.2 | 36.4 | 12.4 | 5.8 | 5.3 | 0.0 | 6.1 | 3.9 | 6.2 | Wolfgang Baasch |
| Lübeck-West | 29.0 | 38.7 | 8.8 | 6.7 | 7.5 | 0.0 | 5.8 | 3.5 | 9.7 | Kerstin Metzner |
| Neumünster | 36.8 | 34.9 | 8.8 | 6.7 | 7.2 | 0.0 | 3.1 | 2.5 | 1.9 | Wolf Rüdiger Fehrs |
| Norderstedt | 36.2 | 34.1 | 8.1 | 8.9 | 6.1 | 0.0 | 4.0 | 2.6 | 2.1 | Katja Rathje-Hoffmann |
| Nordfriesland-Nord | 45.3 | 26.1 | 8.7 | 6.4 | 0.0 | 6.8 | 2.4 | 4.3 | 19.2 | Ingbert Liebing |
| Nordfriesland-Süd | 41.3 | 31.3 | 7.2 | 6.2 | 0.0 | 8.4 | 3.1 | 2.5 | 10.0 | Klaus-Dieter Jensen |
| Ostholstein-Nord | 40.6 | 34.1 | 7.7 | 6.5 | 5.7 | 0.0 | 2.8 | 2.7 | 6.5 | Peer Knöfler |
| Ostholstein-Süd | 41.7 | 32.8 | 7.1 | 8.0 | 5.9 | 0.0 | 2.4 | 2.1 | 8.9 | Hartmut Hamerich |
| Pinneberg | 34.3 | 36.9 | 10.4 | 7.1 | 6.6 | 0.0 | 3.4 | 0.0 | 2.6 | Kai-Oliver Vogel |
| Pinneberg-Elbmarschen | 39.9 | 35.8 | 8.0 | 6.4 | 5.2 | 0.0 | 3.4 | 1.4 | 4.1 | Barbara Ostmeier |
| Pinneberg-Nord | 42.6 | 29.5 | 8.1 | 9.1 | 5.2 | 1.5 | 2.6 | 1.2 | 13.1 | Peter Lehnert |
| Plön-Nord | 39.9 | 33.9 | 11.2 | 8.9 | 0.0 | 0.0 | 3.4 | 2.7 | 6.0 | Werner Kalinka |
| Plön-Ostholstein | 41.5 | 32.2 | 9.6 | 6.9 | 5.1 | 0.0 | 3.0 | 1.7 | 9.3 | Tim Brockmann |
| Rendsburg | 40.0 | 32.2 | 8.2 | 5.3 | 5.0 | 3.9 | 2.9 | 2.4 | 7.8 | Hans Hinrich Neve |
| Rendsburg-Ost | 44.0 | 31.8 | 9.1 | 6.6 | 0.0 | 2.5 | 3.0 | 3.0 | 12.2 | Hauke Göttsch |
| Schleswig | 38.1 | 32.9 | 9.1 | 5.9 | 0.0 | 7.1 | 3.2 | 3.7 | 5.2 | Johannes Callsen |
| Segeberg-Ost | 43.1 | 30.1 | 8.9 | 6.2 | 5.9 | 0.0 | 2.7 | 3.0 | 13.0 | Axel Bernstein |
| Segeberg-West | 39.7 | 32.2 | 7.5 | 7.2 | 6.5 | 0.0 | 3.3 | 3.5 | 7.5 | Ole-Christopher Plambeck |
| Steinburg-Ost | 43.9 | 31.3 | 8.5 | 6.8 | 0.0 | 0.0 | 4.0 | 5.6 | 12.6 | Heiner Rickers |
| Steinburg-West | 45.8 | 30.3 | 10.4 | 8.4 | 0.0 | 0.0 | 3.8 | 1.2 | 15.5 | Hans-Jörn Arp |
| Stormarn-Mitte | 39.1 | 34.4 | 9.0 | 7.6 | 5.4 | 0.0 | 3.2 | 1.3 | 4.7 | Tobias Koch |
| Stormarn-Nord | 38.7 | 30.9 | 9.8 | 7.3 | 5.7 | 0.0 | 3.1 | 4.3 | 7.8 | Claus Christian Claussen |
| Stormarn-Süd | 41.2 | 34.8 | 7.1 | 6.6 | 6.5 | 0.0 | 2.8 | 1.1 | 6.4 | Lukas Kilian |
| Total | 25 | 10 | 0 | 0 | 0 | 0 | 0 | 0 | 15 | - |

=== Results by age group ===
Second votes ("Zweitstimmen") by age group

| Age group | CDU | SPD | Grüne | FDP | AfD | SSW | Linke | Others | Lead |
|---|---|---|---|---|---|---|---|---|---|
| 16–24 | 22 | 27 | 18 | 10 | 5 | 3 | 8 | 7 | 5 |
| 25–34 | 24 | 25 | 12 | 10 | 8 | 5 | 7 | 9 | 1 |
| 35–44 | 31 | 23 | 13 | 11 | 7 | 5 | 4 | 6 | 8 |
| 45–59 | 30 | 28 | 15 | 11 | 7 | 4 | 3 | 2 | 2 |
| 60–69 | 32 | 30 | 12 | 13 | 5 | 3 | 4 | 1 | 2 |
| 70+ | 46 | 28 | 7 | 14 | 3 | 2 | 1 | 0 | 18 |
| Total | 32 | 27 | 13 | 12 | 6 | 3 | 4 | 3 | 5 |
