= 2022 Saarland state election =

German state election

- 27 March 2022

All 51 seats in the Landtag of Saarland 26 seats needed for a majority
- Turnout: 458,223 (61.4% ▼8.3pp)
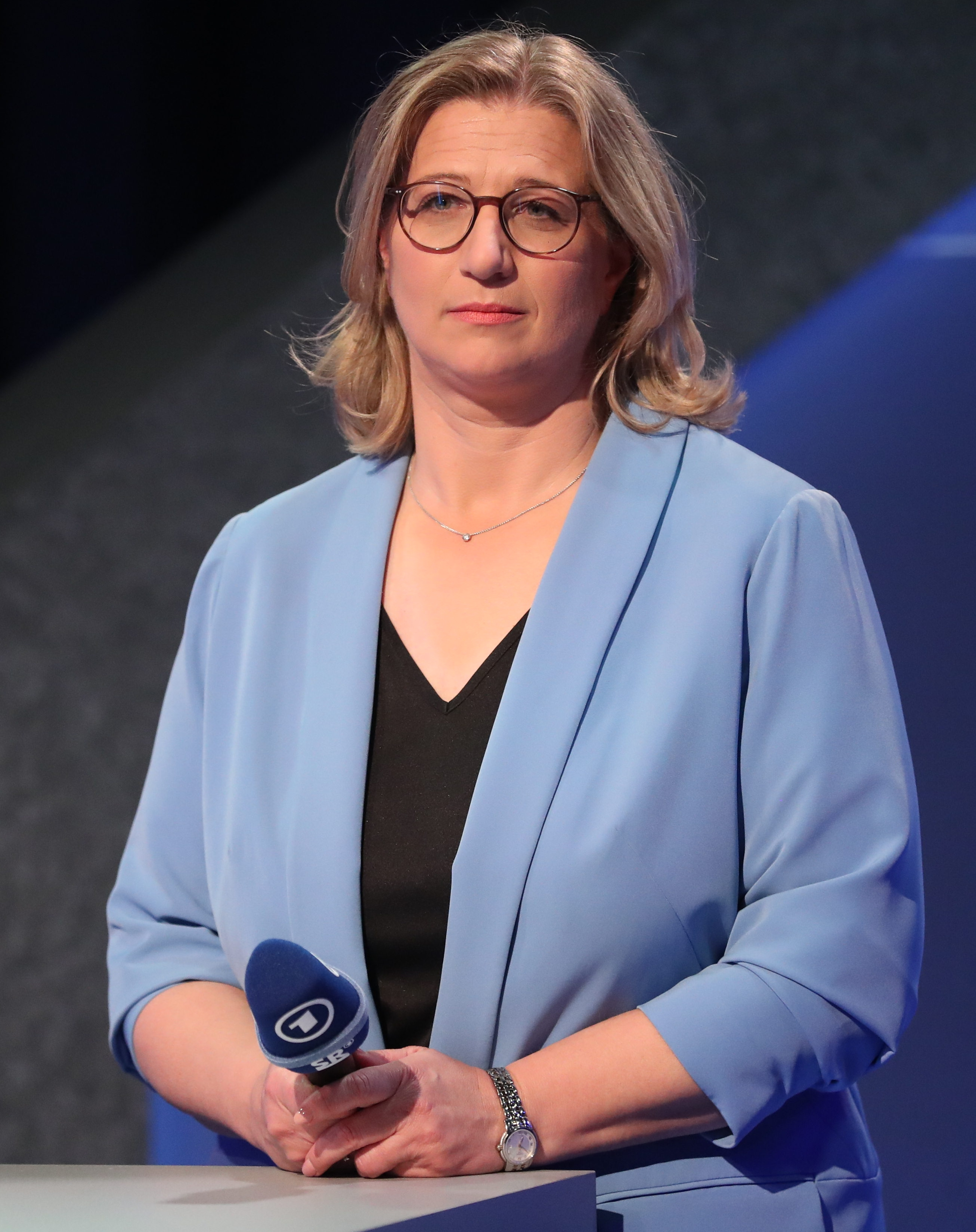

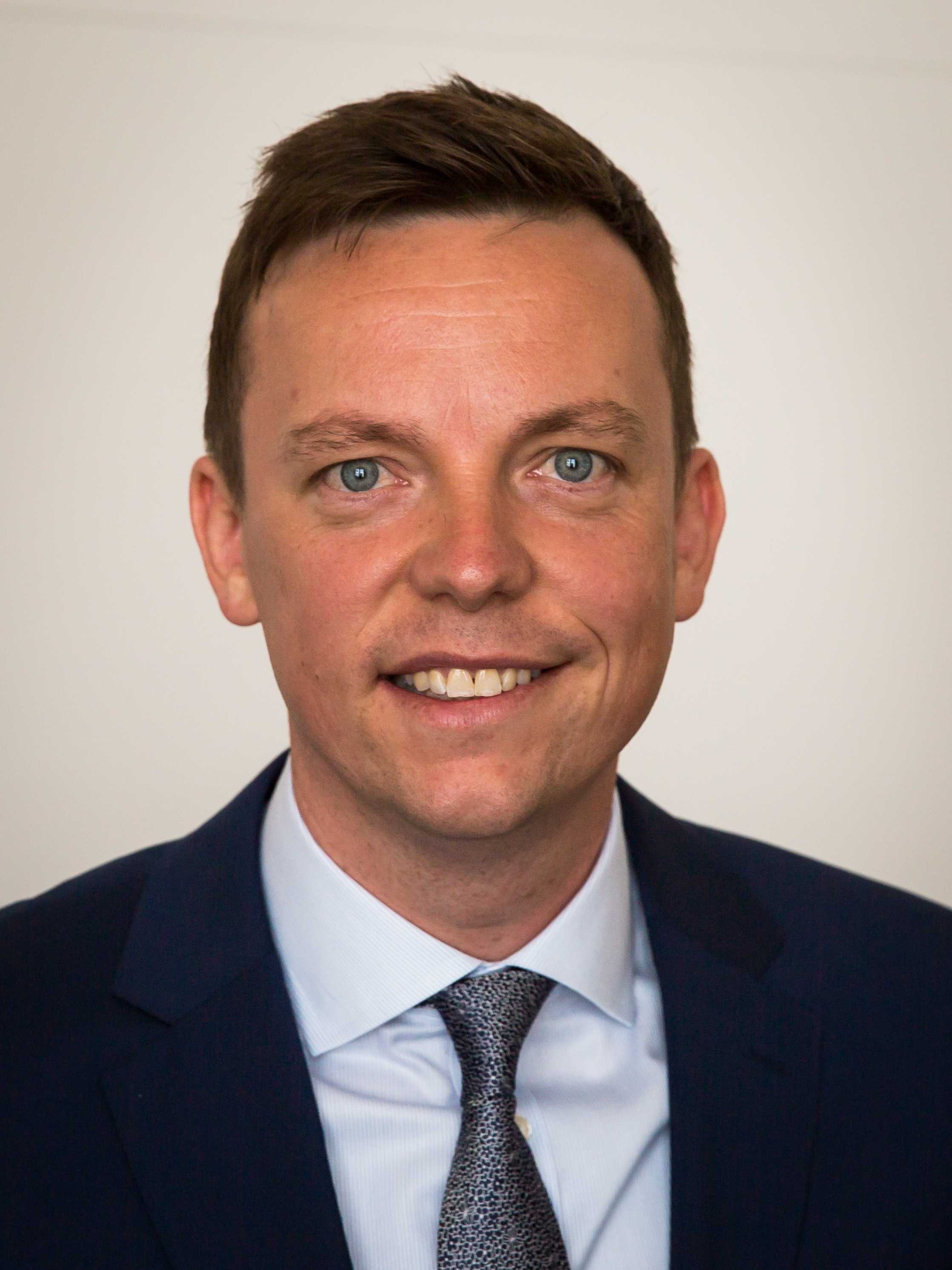

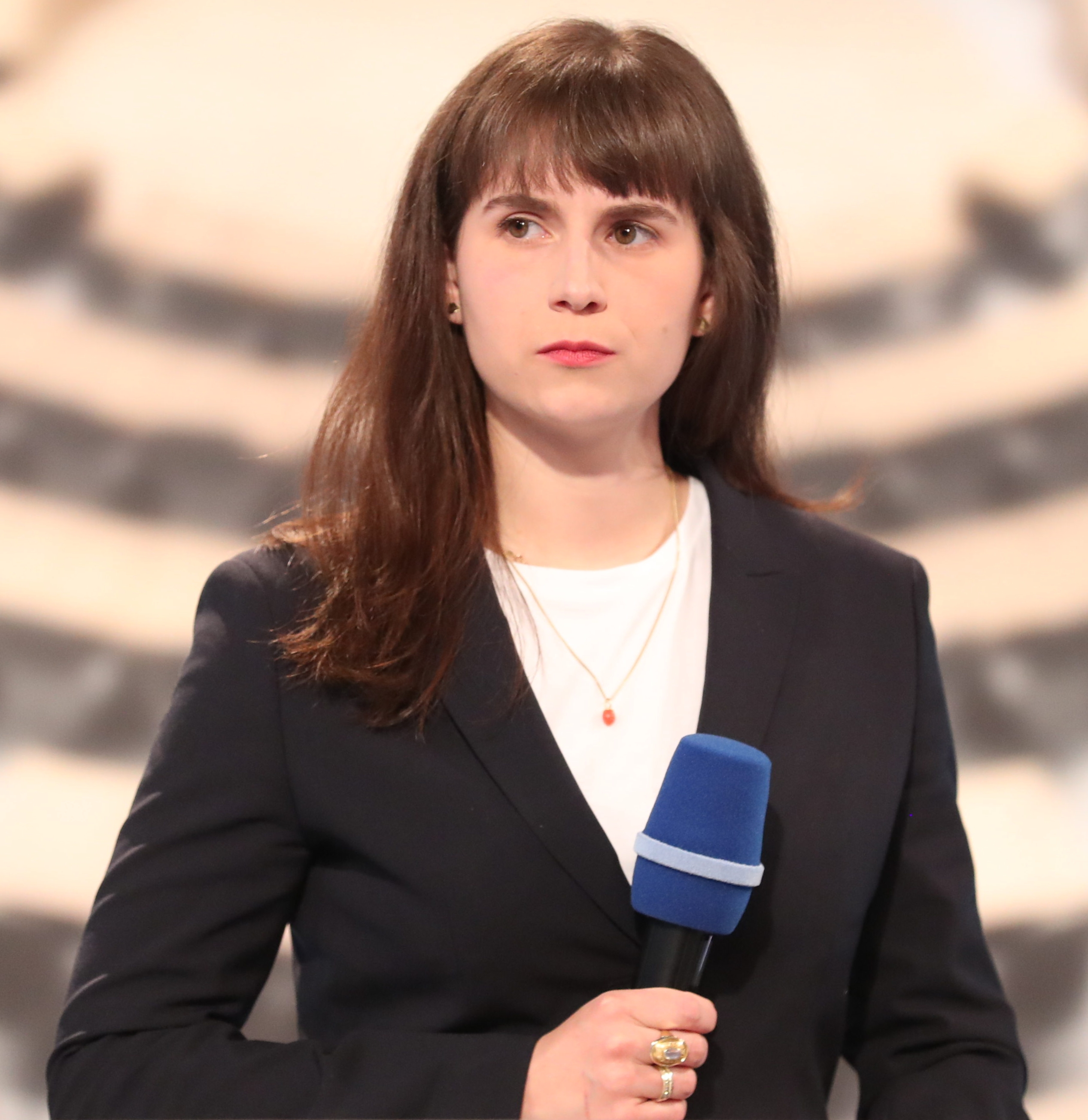

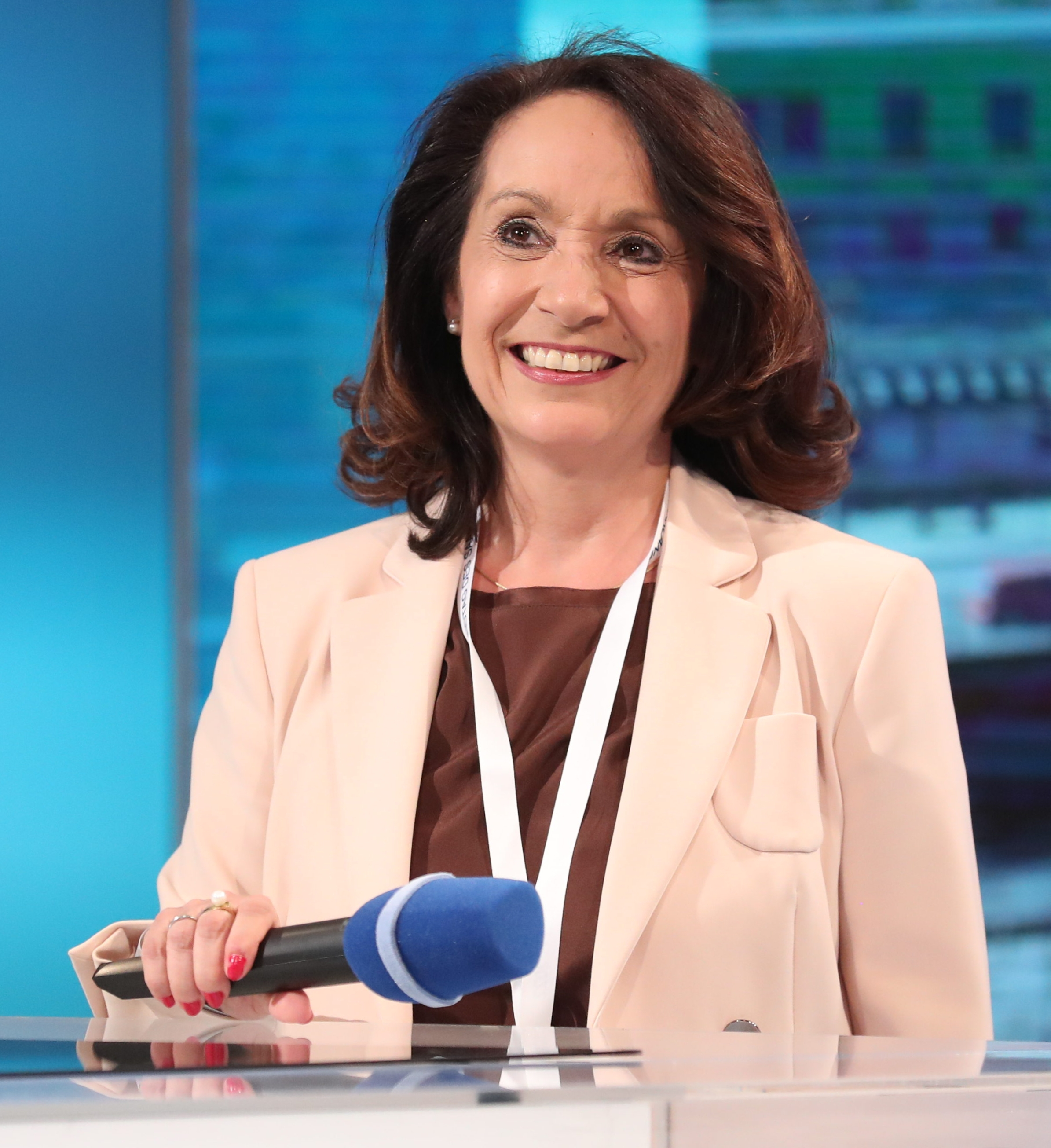

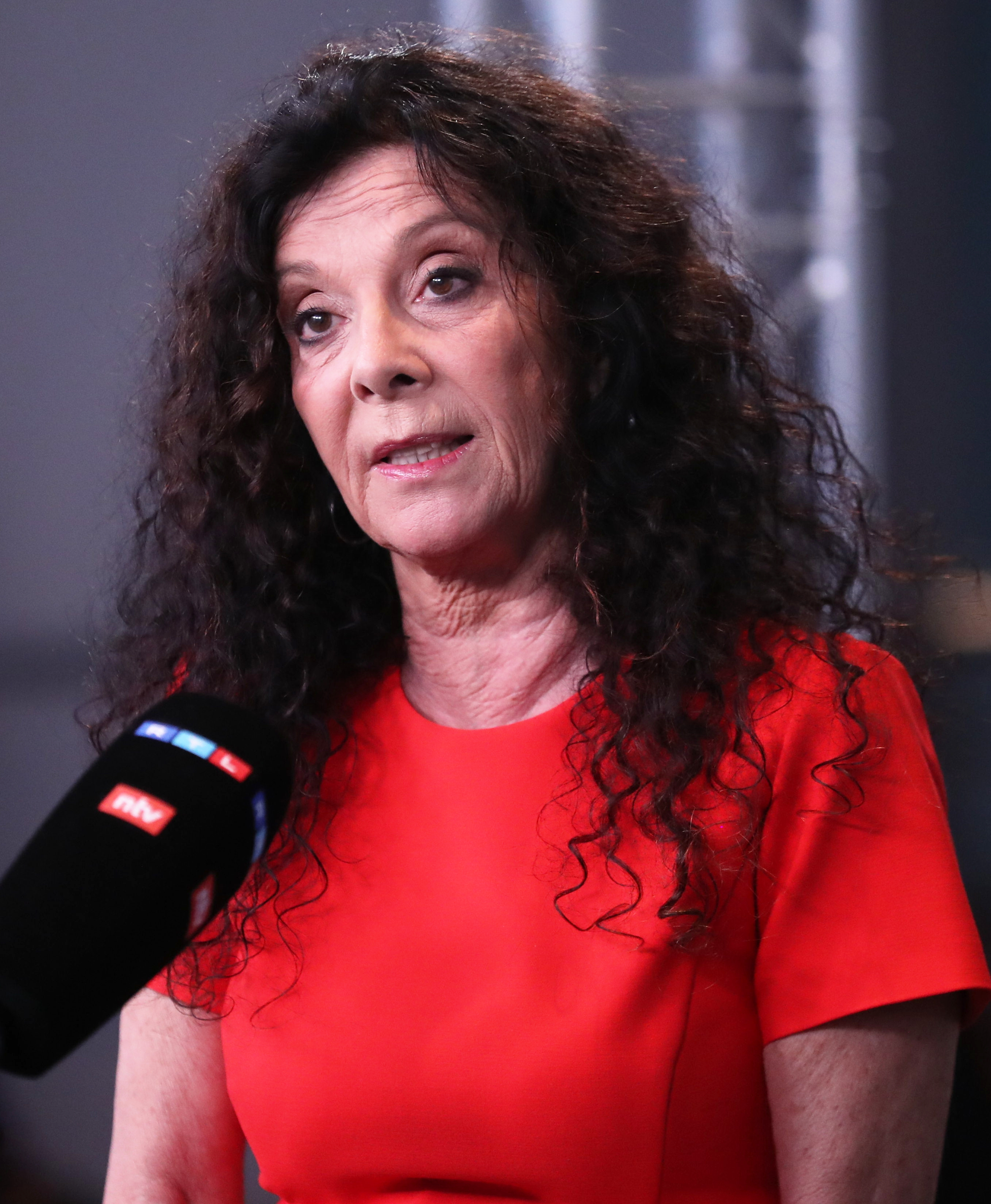
	First party	Second party	Third party
			AfD
Candidate	Anke Rehlinger	Tobias Hans	None (Note: The AfD did not submit a valid state list for the election, meaning it did not have a statewide lead candidate.)
Party	SPD	CDU	AfD
Last election	17 seats, 29.6%	24 seats, 40.7%	3 seats, 6.2%
Seats won	29	19	3
Seat change	▲12	▼5	0
Popular vote	196,801	129,154	25,719
Percentage	43.5%	28.5%	5.7%
Swing	▲13.9pp	▼12.2pp	▼0.5pp
	Fourth party	Fifth party	Sixth party
Candidate	Lisa Becker	Angelika Hießerich-Peter	Barbara Spaniol
Party	Greens	FDP	Left
Last election	0 seats, 4.0%	0 seats, 3.3%	7 seats, 12.8%
Seats won	0	0	0
Seat change	Steady	Steady	▼7
Popular vote	22,598	21,618	11,689
Percentage	4.995%	4.8%	2.6%
Swing	▲1.0pp	▲1.5pp	▼10.3pp
- Results of the election
Government before election
Hans cabinet
CDU–SPD
Government after election
Rehlinger cabinet
SPD

The 2022 Saarland state election was held on 27 March 2022 to elect the 17th Landtag of Saarland. The outgoing government was a coalition of the Christian Democratic Union (CDU) and Social Democratic Party (SPD) led by Minister-President Tobias Hans.

The election was won by the SPD in a historic landslide, capturing a majority in the Landtag and winning at least a plurality in all municipalities of Saarland, largely attributed to the personal popularity of longtime Deputy Minister-President Anke Rehlinger. This election was the first time since the 2017 North Rhine-Westphalia state election that an incumbent Minister-President was defeated for re-election, with the largest margin of defeat since the 2011 Hamburg state election, the first time since the 2013 Bavarian state election that a party received an absolute majority in a Landtag, as well as the first time since 1994 that the SPD did so in the Saarland.

Overall, the SPD won 43.5% of votes to the CDU's 28.5%, a swing of fifteen percentage points between them. The Left lost all their seats after suffering a decline of ten points. The Alternative for Germany became the only minor party in the Landtag with just under 6%, while The Greens fell just 23 votes short of the 5% electoral threshold to win seats. The Free Democratic Party also failed to enter the Landtag with 4.8%. A total of 22.3% of votes did not translate into seats due to the electoral threshold, a record high in any state election.

== Election date ==
The Landtag is elected for five years, with its term commencing when the new Landtag first meets. As the previous election took place on 26 March 2017, the next election was required to take place before April 2022.

== Electoral system ==
The 51 members of the Landtag are elected via closed list proportional representation using the d'Hondt method. 41 seats are distributed in three multi-member constituencies, and the remaining ten at the state level. An electoral threshold of 5% of valid votes is applied to the Landtag; parties that fall below this threshold are ineligible to receive seats.

== Background ==
In the previous election held on 26 March 2017, the CDU remained the largest party with 40.7% of votes cast, an increase of 5.5 percentage points. The SPD declined slightly to 29.6%. The Left fell to 12.8%, a decline of 3.3 points. Alternative for Germany (AfD) contested its first election in Saarland, winning 6.2%. The Greens lost their representation in the Landtag with a result of 4.0%.

The CDU had led a grand coalition with the SPD since 2012 under Minister-President Annegret Kramp-Karrenbauer, which was renewed after the election. Kramp-Karrenbauer resigned as Minister-President after her, ultimately unsuccessful, entry into federal politics in February 2018, and was succeeded by Tobias Hans as Minister-President in March and as state CDU leader in October 2018.

Even though the Saarland is the second smallest state by population and does not represent Germany as a whole demographically, the election proved to be of pivotal importance to the following state elections and in particular the federal election later that year. New SPD lead candidate Martin Schulz led the party to a resurgence nationally in early 2017, and polls showed the SPD within striking distance of winning in Saarland. However, the clear CDU victory marked the beginning of a decline on both the federal level and in other states. This resulted in heavy losses for the SPD in Schleswig-Holstein, in North Rhine-Westphalia and, ultimately, in the 2017 German federal election. Similarly, the 2022 election was seen as a test both for the ruling Scholz cabinet and new CDU leader Friedrich Merz, and would set the tone for several more state elections throughout the year.

Until July 2021, the CDU had a solid lead in opinion polling. However, following the decline of the CDU on the federal level, the SPD surged ahead, cemented by the personal popularity of longtime Deputy Minister-President Anke Rehlinger.

== Parties ==
The table below lists parties represented in the 16th Landtag of Saarland.

Name		Ideology	Lead candidate	2017 result		At dissolution
Name		Ideology	Lead candidate	Votes (%)	Seats	At dissolution
CDU	Christian Democratic Union of Germany; Christlich Demokratische Union Deutschlands	Christian democracy	Tobias Hans	40.7%	24 / 51	24 / 51
SPD	Social Democratic Party of Germany; Sozialdemokratische Partei Deutschlands	Social democracy	Anke Rehlinger	29.6%	17 / 51	17 / 51
Linke	The Left; Die Linke	Democratic socialism	Barbara Spaniol	12.8%	7 / 51	5 / 51 2 / 51 (Note: The Left faction was reduced to six members after the resignation of Dagmar Ensch-Engel in August 2018, then to five after the expulsion of Barbara Spaniol in November 2021. Ensch-Engel and Spaniol formed the Saar-Linke parliamentary faction in November 2021, but remain members of The Left.)
AfD	Alternative for Germany; Alternative für Deutschland	Right-wing populism	N/A	6.2%	3 / 51	2 / 51
Independents					0 / 51	1 / 51

In addition to the parties already represented in the Landtag, fourteen parties collected enough signatures to be placed on the ballot.

- Alliance 90/The Greens (GRÜNE)
- Free Democratic Party (FDP)
- Family Party of Germany (FAMILIE)
- Pirate Party Germany (PIRATEN)
- Free Voters (FREIE WÄHLER)
- Grassroots Democratic Party of Germany (dieBasis)
- Bunt.saar – social-ecological list (Bunt.saar)
- Ecological Democratic Party (ÖDP)
- The Humanists (Die Humanisten)
- Die PARTEI (DIE PARTEI)
- Party for Health Research (Gesundheitsforschung)
- Human Environment Animal Protection Party (Tierschutzpartei)
- SGV – Solidarity, Justice, Change (SGV)
- Volt Germany (Volt)

=== Lead candidates ===
==== The Left ====
Since at least 2017, the Saarland branch of The Left was embroiled into a dispute between Thomas Lutze, state treasurer from 2013 to 2017 and chairman since 2019, and Oskar Lafontaine, parliamentary leader since 2009. Lutze was accused of manipulating internal party elections by forging documents and fraudulently paying membership dues. Public audits from 2017 to 2020 and a federal review in 2021 provided no evidence of irregularities. The Saarbrücken public prosecutor's office began an investigation into Lutze in March 2021, but the case was dropped in January 2022.

In May 2021, the state executive requested that Lafontaine and former state chairwoman Astrid Schramm resign from the party, accusing them of being "the driving force behind the internal mudslinging that has been going on for years at the party's expense". They refused. After the federal election in September, Lafontaine announced that he would not seek re-election to the Landtag in the upcoming state election.

On 2 November 2021, deputy state chairwoman Barbara Spaniol was expelled from the Left parliamentary faction, accused of "supporting the public attacks by the state chairman against the Left faction". On 10 November, she founded the Saar-Linke parliamentary group with Dagmar Ensch-Engel, who had previously resigned from the Left faction in 2018 after facing pressure from the Lafontaine camp. On 21 November, Spaniol was elected as The Left's lead candidate for the state election, winning 85.1% support.

==== AfD ====
In January 2022, the Alternative for Germany's state list was withdrawn by the party trustees shortly before the deadline for candidate submissions passed. Two members of the party's state executive had arbitrarily switched out the trustees, who then withdrew the list. State chairman Christian Wirth alleged that the four members involved did not support the proposed lead candidate Kai Melling. The party still competed in all three regional constituencies, which together provided 41 of the 51 members of the Landtag. However, due to the lack of a state list, the AfD was without a lead candidate.

==== Greens ====
At the Alliance 90/The Greens state congress on 7 January 2022, Lisa Becker was elected as lead candidate for the state election. She was one of three candidates alongside state chairwoman Uta Sullenberger and Kiymet Goektas; the former withdrew before the ballot and Becker defeated Goektas with 110 votes to 80.

==== FDP ====
Angelika Hießerich-Peter was elected as the FDP's lead candidate for the election, winning 79% of votes at a party congress.

== Opinion polling ==
=== Graphical summary ===
Local regression of polls conducted.

=== Party polling ===
Polling firm	Fieldwork date	Sample size	CDU	SPD	Linke	AfD	Grüne	FDP	FW	bunt. saar	Others	Lead
2022 state election	27 Mar 2022	–	28.5	43.5	2.6	5.7	5.0	4.8	1.7	1.4	6.8	15.0
Wahlkreisprognose	21–25 Mar 2022	940	28	41	4	6.5	5	5.5	–	–	10	13
Forschungsgruppe Wahlen	21–24 Mar 2022	2,375	28	41	4	6.5	5.5	5	–	–	10	13
Wahlkreisprognose	15–18 Mar 2022	978	30	38	3.5	6	5	5.5	–	–	12	8
Forschungsgruppe Wahlen	15–17 Mar 2022	1,024	30	39	4	6	6	5	–	–	10	9
INSA	14–17 Mar 2022	1,000	31	39	4	6	5	5	–	–	10	8
Infratest dimap	14–16 Mar 2022	1,421	31	37	4	6	5	5	–	3	9	6
Wahlkreisprognose	3–8 Mar 2022	1,219	30	35.5	5.5	8.5	7	6.5	1	–	6	5.5
Infratest dimap	8–12 Feb 2022	1,175	29	38	5	8	6	6	–	–	8	9
Wahlkreisprognose	1–7 Feb 2022	1,504	33	34	5	7	6.5	6.5	4	–	4	1
INSA	17–24 Jan 2022	1,002	30	35	7	7	8	6	–	–	7	5
Wahlkreisprognose	15–24 Dec 2021	1,004	33.5	38	4	7	6	6	3	–	2.5	4.5
Infratest dimap	16–20 Nov 2021	1,165	28	33	6	9	8	8	–	–	8	5
Wahlkreisprognose	2–11 Nov 2021	–	29	38	4.5	8	5	9	3	–	3.5	9
2021 federal election	26 Sep 2021	–	23.6	37.3	7.2	10.0	–	11.5	2.0	–	8.5	13.7
Wahlkreisprognose	14–22 Jul 2021	–	37	29	8	6	7.5	5	–	–	7.5	8
INSA	5–19 Jul 2021	1,048	36	27	7	6	9	7	–	–	8	9
Wahlkreisprognose	18–25 May 2021	–	24.5	21	11	9.5	17.5	7	5	–	4.5	3.5
INSA	3–10 May 2021	1,052	31	21	14	6	15	7	–	–	6	10
Infratest dimap	2–7 Nov 2020	1,000	40	22	11	8	12	3	–	–	4	18
Wahlkreisprognose	22–29 Jun 2020	–	45	33	5.5	4	6	3.5	–	–	5	12
Wahlkreisprognose	10–22 Apr 2020	–	40.5	32.5	7	7	5	4.5	–	–	3.5	8
INSA	19 Nov–2 Dec 2019	1,000	36	24	11	7	15	4	–	–	3	12
2019 EP election	26 May 2019	–	32.5	23.1	6.0	9.6	13.2	3.7	1.1	–	12.0	9.6
Infratest dimap	29 Apr–6 May 2019	1,000	37	25	12	8	11	4	–	–	3	12
Infratest dimap	14–19 Jun 2018	1,000	35	26	12	15	6	4	–	–	2	9
2017 federal election	24 Sep 2017	–	32.4	27.1	12.9	10.1	6.0	7.6	0.8	–	3.0	5.3
2017 state election	26 Mar 2017	–	40.7	29.6	12.8	6.2	4.0	3.3	0.4	–	3.0	11.1

=== Minister-President polling ===
Polling firm	Fieldwork date	Sample size			None/Unsure	Lead
Polling firm	Fieldwork date	Sample size	Hans CDU	Rehlinger SPD	None/Unsure	Lead
Wahlkreisprognose	21–25 Mar 2022	940	33	59	8	26
Forschungsgruppe Wahlen	21–24 Mar 2022	2,375	30	57	13	27
Wahlkreisprognose	15–18 Mar 2022	978	31	55	14	24
Forschungsgruppe Wahlen	15–17 Mar 2022	1,024	31	52	17	21
Infratest dimap	14–16 Mar 2022	1,421	33	49	18	16
Wahlkreisprognose	3–8 Mar 2022	1,219	35.5	49.5	15	14
Wahlkreisprognose	1–7 Feb 2022	1,504	43	46	11	3
Wahlkreisprognose	15–24 Dec 2021	1,004	42	44	14	2
Infratest dimap	16–20 Nov 2021	1,165	39	42	19	3
Infratest dimap	2–11 Nov 2020	1,000	52	32	16	20
Infratest dimap	8 May 2019	1,000	39	37	24	2

=== Party competences ===
Polling firm	Fieldwork date	Sample size	Category	CDU	SPD	Linke	AfD	Grüne	FDP	Others/None	Lead
Infratest dimap	16–20 Nov 2021	1,165									
Infratest dimap	16–20 Nov 2021	1,165	Economy	27	33	3	5	2	8	18	6
Infratest dimap	16–20 Nov 2021	1,165	Education	26	32	4	4	3	6	21	6
Infratest dimap	16–20 Nov 2021	1,165	Jobs	24	38	3	5	2	7	18	14
Infratest dimap	16–20 Nov 2021	1,165	Asylum	24	26	4	9	6	3	23	2
Infratest dimap	16–20 Nov 2021	1,165	Health Care	24	34	4	5	4	4	21	10
Infratest dimap	16–20 Nov 2021	1,165	Transport	22	31	3	3	8	6	23	9
Infratest dimap	16–20 Nov 2021	1,165	Social justice	15	42	11	5	3	3	18	27
Infratest dimap	16–20 Nov 2021	1,165	Environment	12	21	3	4	34	4	18	13
Infratest dimap	16–20 Nov 2021	1,165	Solving Biggest Problems	24	35	3	5	3	4	20	11
Infratest dimap	2–11 Nov 2020	1,000	Corona	55	14	2	2	2	0	22	41
Infratest dimap	2–11 Nov 2020	1,000	Homeland security	49	13	5	8	2	1	20	36
Infratest dimap	2–11 Nov 2020	1,000	Economy	48	23	5	1	3	5	14	25
Infratest dimap	2–11 Nov 2020	1,000	Finances	44	15	7	2	2	2	26	29
Infratest dimap	2–11 Nov 2020	1,000	Jobs	40	29	8	2	2	4	13	11
Infratest dimap	2–11 Nov 2020	1,000	Health Care	40	27	6	1	3	1	19	13
Infratest dimap	2–11 Nov 2020	1,000	Education	34	26	8	1	5	3	20	8
Infratest dimap	2–11 Nov 2020	1,000	Integration	30	23	6	3	10	2	22	7
Infratest dimap	2–11 Nov 2020	1,000	Family	25	37	8	2	8	0	16	12
Infratest dimap	2–11 Nov 2020	1,000	Public transport	20	25	6	0	22	1	22	3
Infratest dimap	2–11 Nov 2020	1,000	Social justice	19	35	21	3	5	1	14	14
Infratest dimap	2–11 Nov 2020	1,000	Environment	13	11	3	1	57	1	12	44
Infratest dimap	2–11 Nov 2020	1,000	Solving Biggest Problems	41	19	8	3	5	2	19	22

== Results ==
Party	Votes	%	Swing	Seats	+/–
Social Democratic Party of Germany (SPD)	196,801	43.5	▲13.9	29	▲12
Christian Democratic Union of Germany (CDU)	129,154	28.5	▼12.2	19	▼5
Alternative for Germany (AfD)	25,719	5.7	▼0.5	3	0
Alliance 90/The Greens (GRÜNE)	22,598	4.995	▲1.0	0	0
Free Democratic Party (FDP)	21,618	4.8	▲1.5	0	0
The Left (LINKE)	11,689	2.6	▼10.3	0	▼7
Human Environment Animal Protection Party	10,391	2.3	New	0	New
Free Voters	7,636	1.7	▲1.3	0	0
Grassroots Democratic Party of Germany	6,448	1.4	New	0	New
Bunt.saar – social-ecological list	6,216	1.4	New	0	New
Die PARTEI	4,716	1.0	New	0	New
Family Party of Germany	3,836	0.8	0.0	0	0
Volt Germany	2,645	0.6	New	0	New
Pirate Party Germany	1,318	0.3	▼0.5	0	0
Ecological Democratic Party	613	0.1	New	0	New
SGV – Solidarity, Justice, Change	412	0.1	New	0	New
Party for Health Research	368	0.1	New	0	New
Die Humanisten	233	0.1	New	0	New
Valid	452,411	98.8			
Invalid	5,702	1.2			
Total	458,113	100.0		51	0
Registered voters/turnout	746,307	61.4	▼8.3		
Source: State Returning Officer

== Aftermath ==
Minister-President Tobias Hans conceded defeat on the evening of the election and claimed responsibility for the result. Due to her party securing an absolute majority, Anke Rehlinger expressed her intent to govern without a coalition.

Rehlinger was elected as Minister-President by the Landtag on 25 April, winning 32 votes out of 51 cast.
