= 2024 Saarland local elections =

Local elections in Germany

- 9 June 2024

204 district council seats 1,682 municipal council seats
- Turnout: 508,185 (64.99%) ▲1.41% 507,552 (65.05%) ▲1.34%
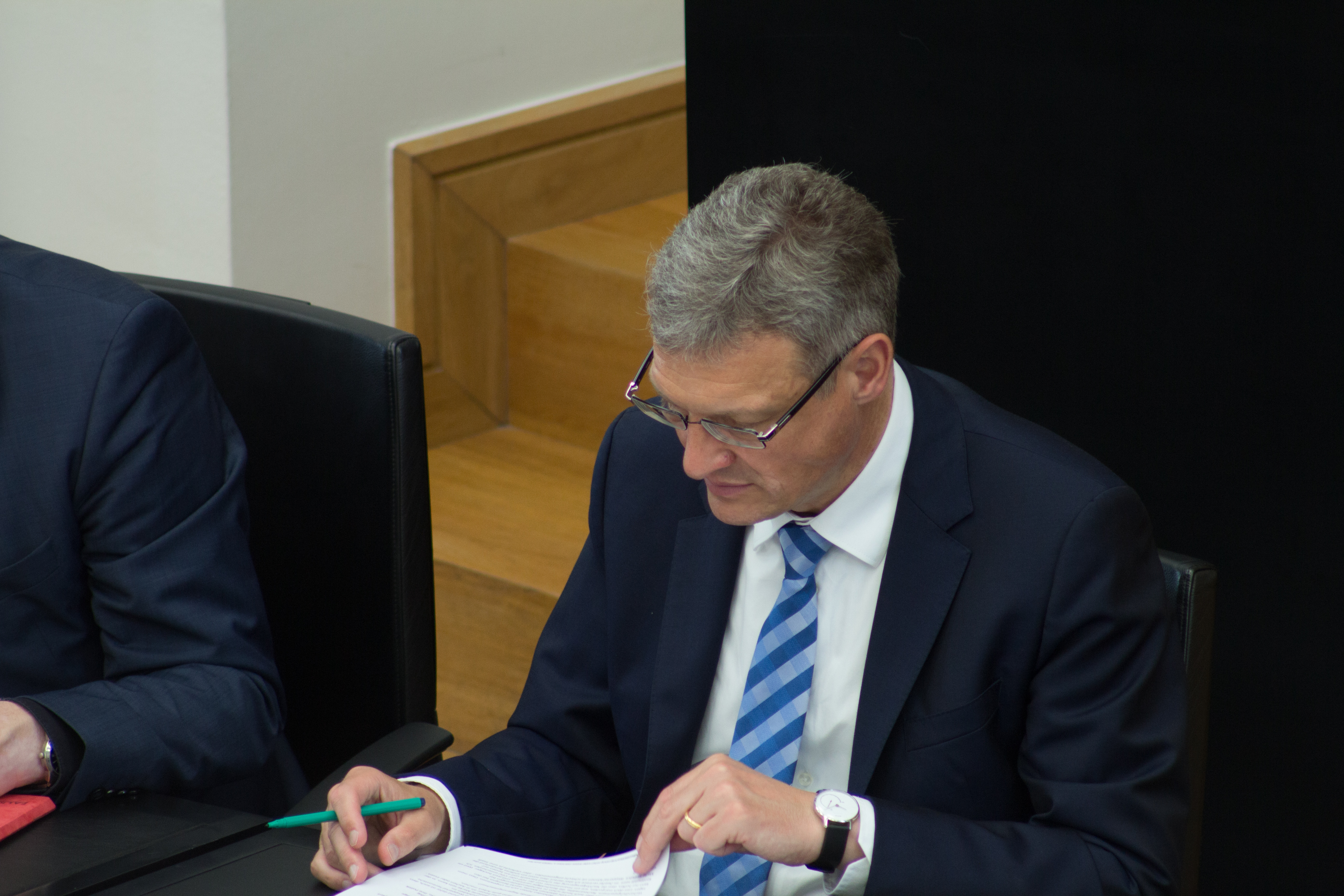

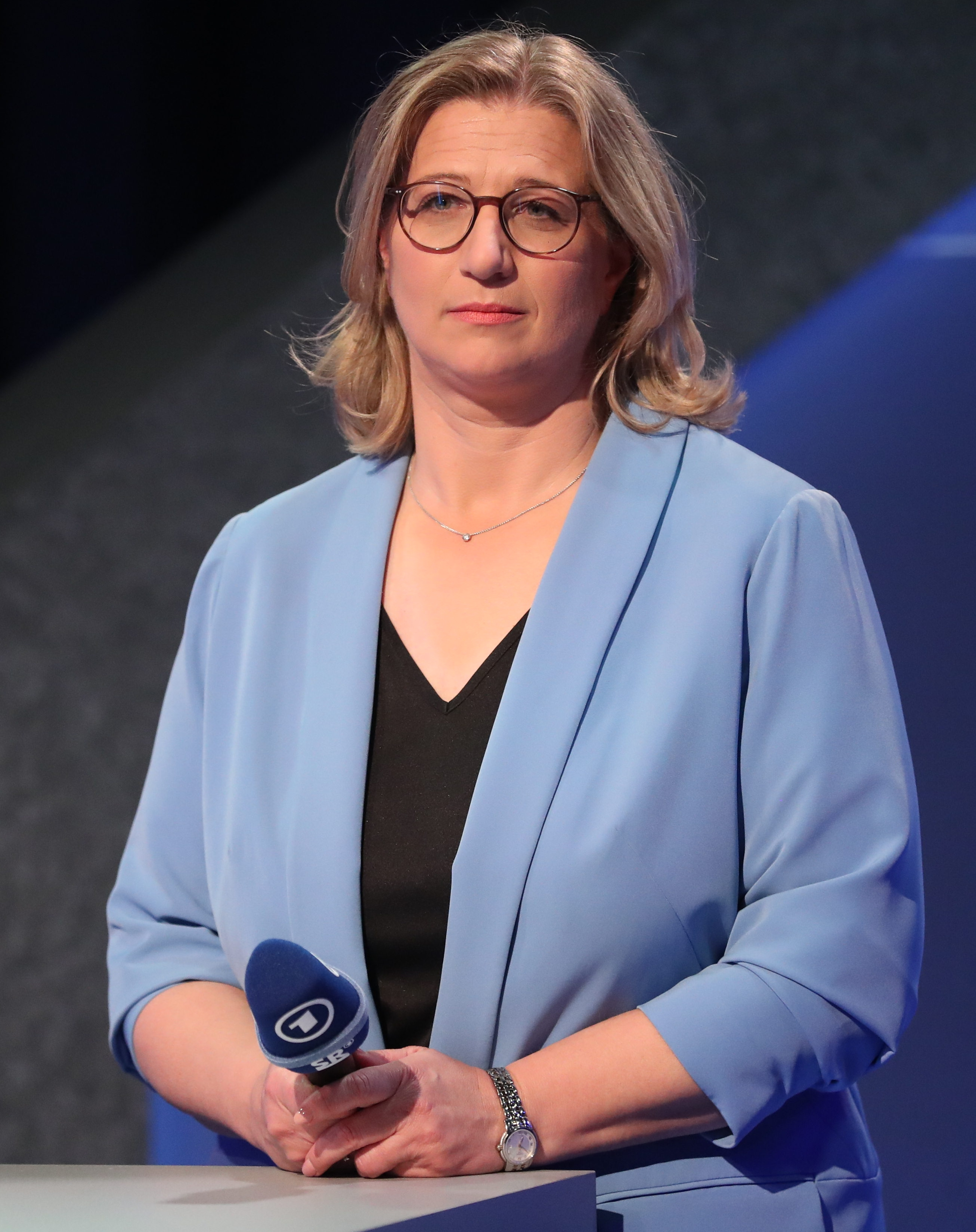

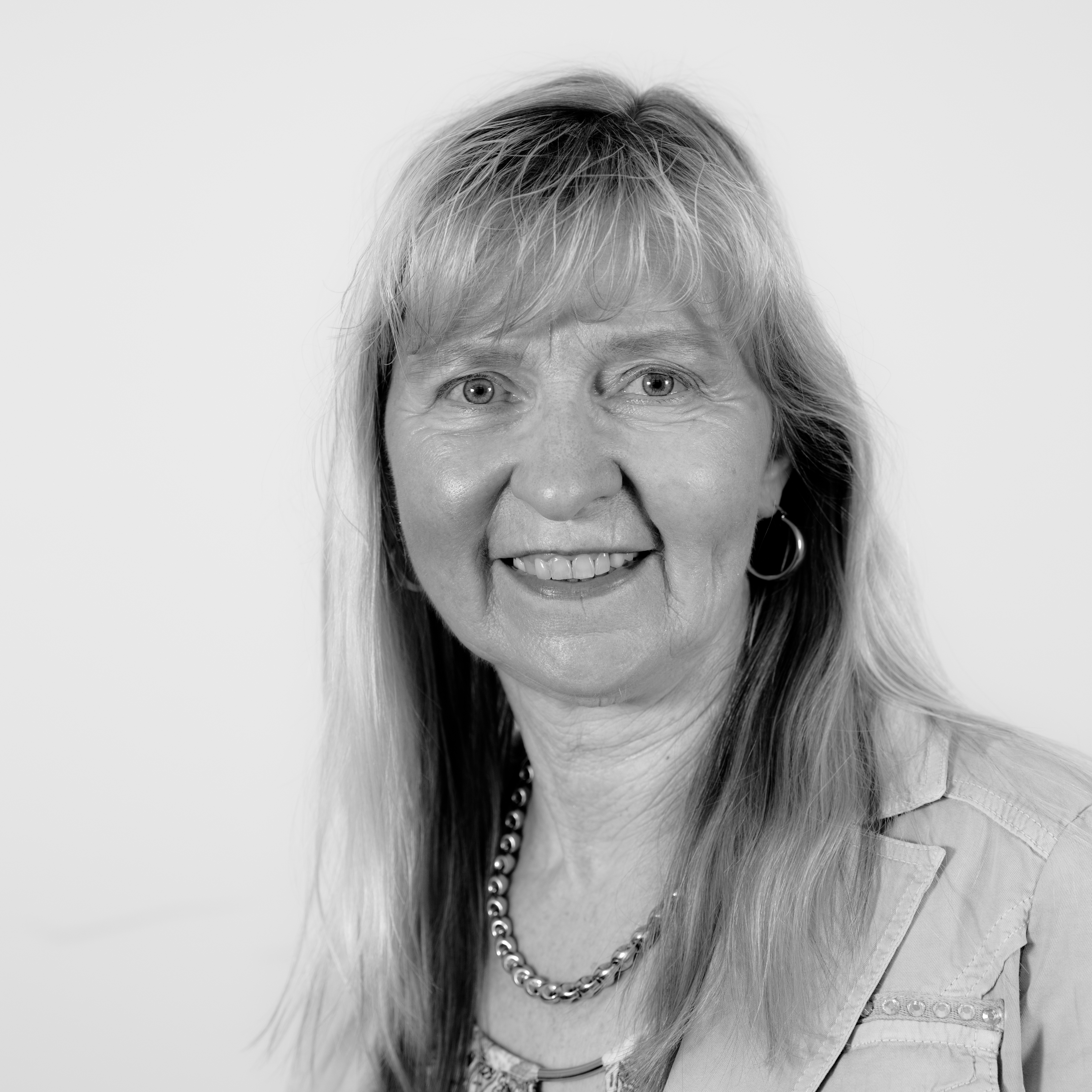

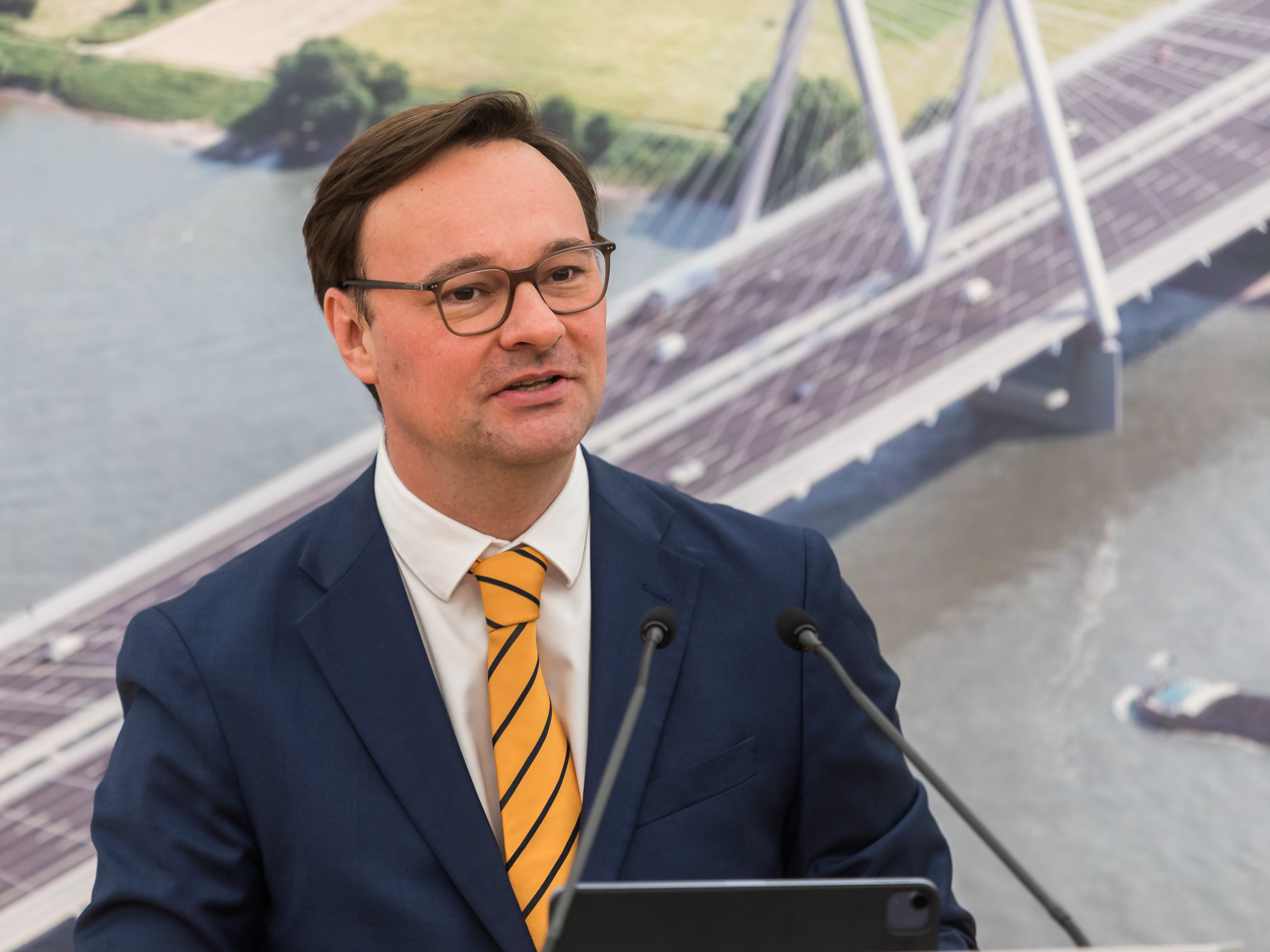

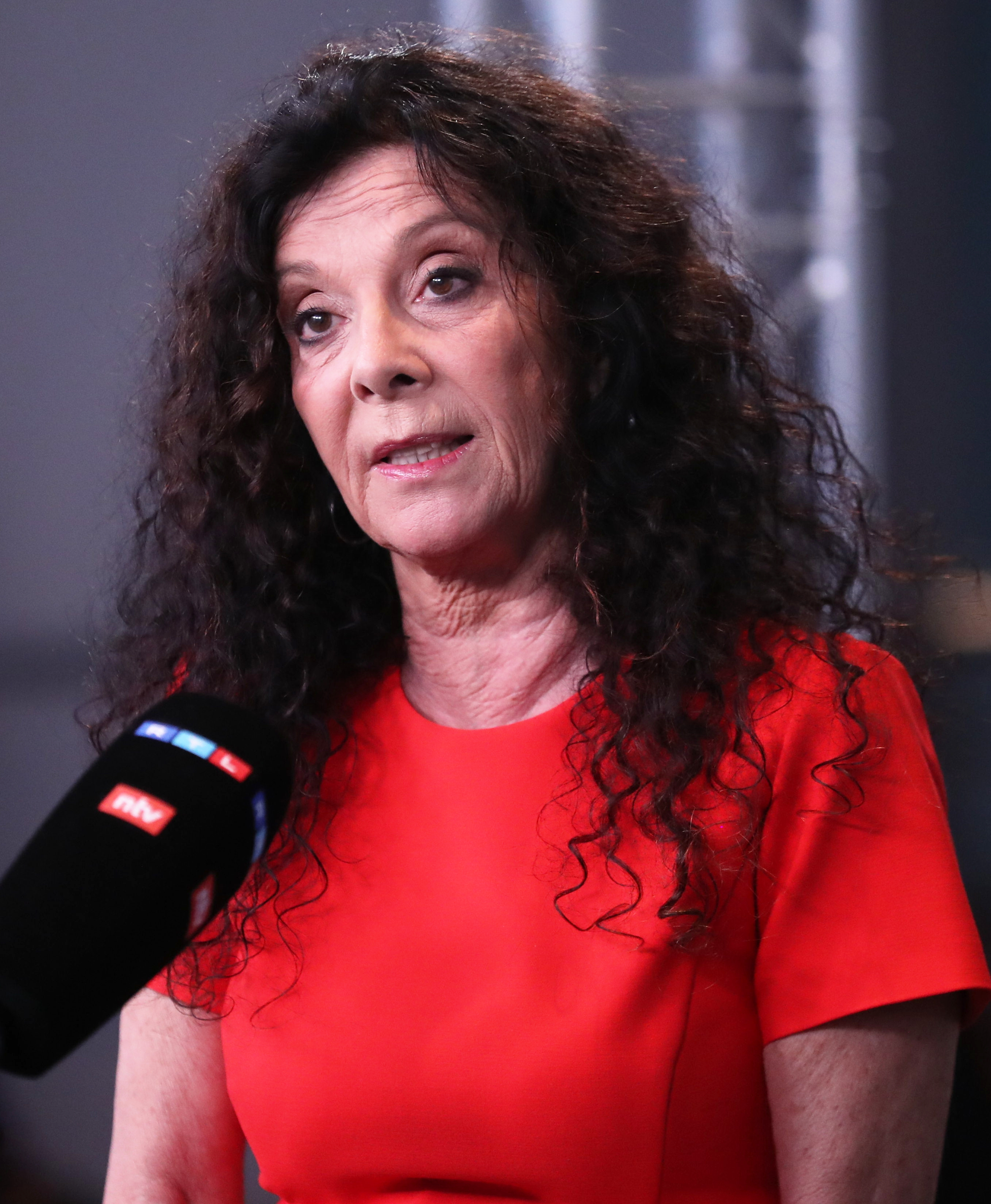
	First party	Second party	Third party
Leader	Stephan Toscani	Anke Rehlinger	Carsten Becker
Party	CDU	SPD	AfD
Last election	76 seats, 34.02% 689 seats, 35.38%	65 seats, 30.03% 591 seats, 30.94%	16 seats, 4.95% 66 seats, 8.55%
Seats won	76; 667	63; 568	23; 121
Seat change	0 ▼22	▼2 ▼23	▲7 ▲55
Popular vote	169,831; 174,580	147,683; 153,843	51,401; 44,114
Percentage	34.38% 35.27%	29.90% 31.08%	10.41% 8.91%
Swing	▲0.36% ▼0.11%	▼0.13% ▲0.14%	▲5.46% ▲0.36%
	Fourth party	Fifth party	Sixth party
Leader	Jeanne Dillschneider & Volker Morbe	Astrid Schramm	Oliver Luksic
Party	Greens	BSW	FDP
Last election	28 seats, 12.60% 160 seats, 11.02%	Did not exist	6 seats, 4.25% 53 seats, 3.98%
Seats won	13; 79	7; 8	6; 30
Seat change	▼15 ▼81	New party	▼23
Popular vote	35,975; 31,952	17,942; 1,803	19,213; 18,541
Percentage	7.28% 6.46%	2.71% 0.46%	3.89% 3.75%
Swing	▼5.32% ▼4.56%	New party	▼0.36% ▼0.23%
	Seventh party
Leader	Barbara Spaniol
Party	Linke
Last election	13 seats, 7.48% 95 seats, 6.48%
Seats won	5; 33
Seat change	▼7 ▼62
Popular vote	20,240; 16,587
Percentage	4.10% 3.35%
Swing	▼3.38% ▼3.13%

The 2024 Saarland local elections were held on June 9, 2024 to elect members of Saarland's 6 district councils and 52 municipal councils. The elections were held on the same day as the 2024 European Parliament election in Germany.

== Background ==
Local elections are held in Saarland every five years. All Germans and European Union citizens who have reached the age of 18 and have resided in their municipality for at least three months were eligible to vote.

== Results ==
Overall, the elections represented a shift towards both right wing politics and localist politics. The Alternative for Germany in particularly experience unprecedented success, and elected at least one representative to nearly ever municipal council in Saarland. Conversely, the Greens suffered the most significant losses, losing more than half their representatives at both the district and municipal level.

Summary of results for the 2024 Saarland local elections
Party	Votes (District)	%	+/-	Seats	+/-	Votes (Municipal)	%	+/-	Seats	+/-
Christian Democratic Union (CDU)	169,831	34.38	▲0.36	76	0	174,580	35.27	▼0.11	667	▼22
Social Democratic Party (SPD)	147,683	29.90	▼0.13	63	▼2	153,843	31.08	▲0.14	568	▼23
Alternative for Germany (AfD)	51,401	10.41	▲5.46	23	▲7	44,114	8.91	▲0.36	121	▲55
The Greens (Grüne)	35,975	7.28	▼5.32	13	▼15	31,952	6.46	▼4.56	79	▼81
Sahra Wagenknecht Alliance (BSW)	17,942	3.63	New	7	New	1,803	0.46	New	8	New
Free Democratic Party (FDP)	19,213	3.89	▼0.36	6	0	18,541	3.75	▼0.23	40	▼23
Free Voters (FW)	17,243	3.49	▲3.04	6	▲5	–	–	–	–	–
Die Linke	20,240	4.10	▼3.38	5	▼7	16,587	3.35	▼3.13	33	▼62
Local voters' associations	7,755	1.57	▲0.60	3	▲2	44,751	9.04	▲2.95	161	▲50
bunt.saar	3,628	0.73	New	1	New	2,431	0.49	New	2	New
Family Party	3,087	0.62	▲0.05	1	0	1,134	0.23	▲0.01	3	0
Die PARTEI	–	–	–	–	–	5,200	1.04	▲0.53	4	▲2
Total	493,998	97.21	▼0.46	204	▼3	494,936	97.51	▼0.25	1,682	▼88
Invalid votes	14,187	2.79	▲0.46			12,616	2.49	▲0.25		
Voter turnout	508,185	64.99	▲1.41			507,552	65.05	▲1.34		
Eligible voters	781,929					780,133				

== 2026 repeat election ==
On August 30, 2026, the elections for the Saarbrücken Regional Association were repeated due to a court annulling the previous result.
