= Lisa Becker =

German politician (born 1990)

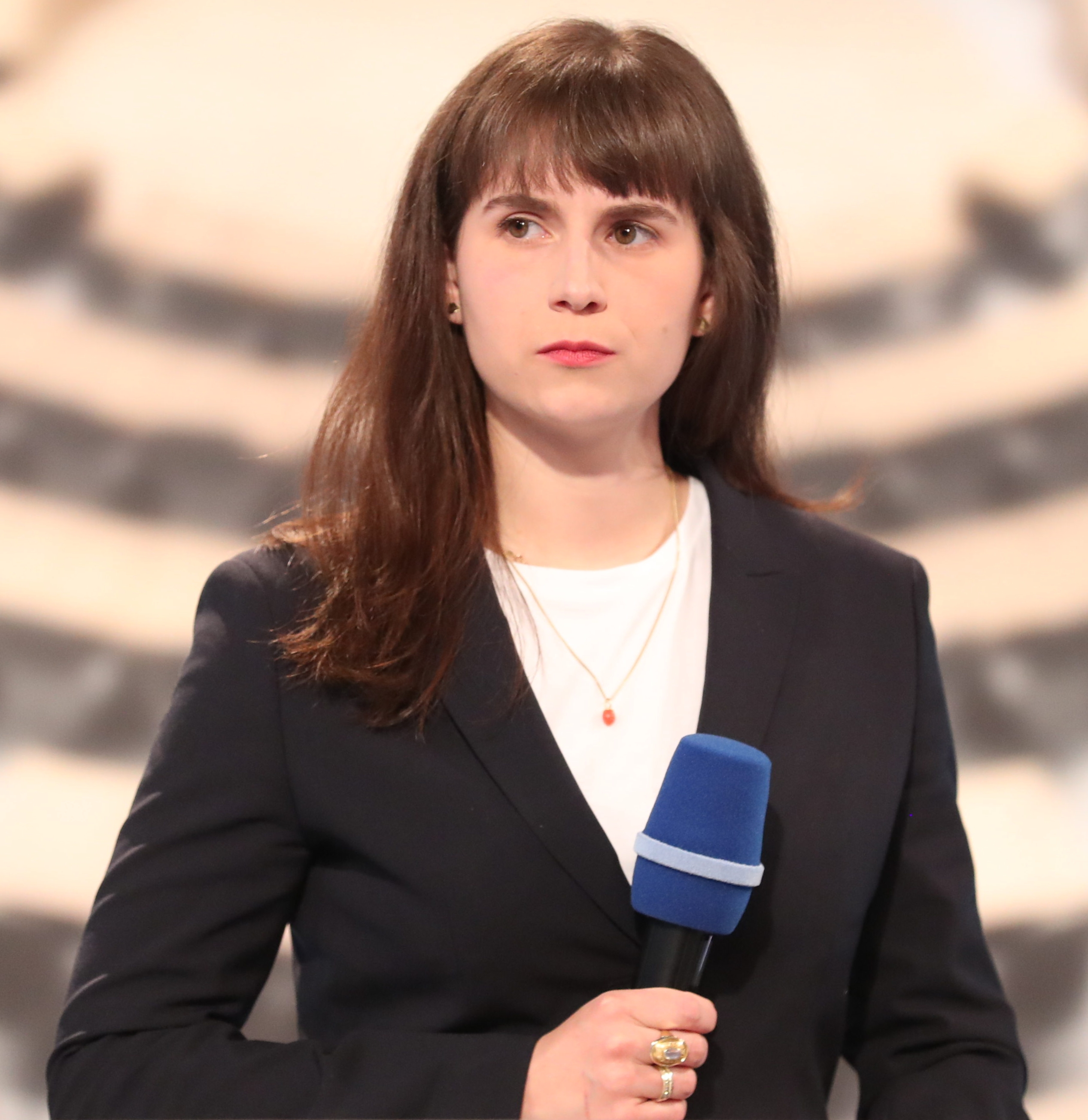
- Lisa Becker (2022)

First Deputy of Blieskastel Public Order, Culture, and Tourism
- Incumbent
- Assumed office 4 July 2019

Personal details
- Born: 1990 (age 35–36) Zweibrücken, Rhineland-Palatinate, Germany
- Party: The Greens
- Education: Saarland University

Lisa Becker (born 1990) is a German lawyer and politician of The Greens. She has been a member of the city council of Blieskastel since 2014. She unsuccessfully ran for mayor of the town in 2019, and afterwards became first deputy in the city government. She was the Greens' lead candidate for the 2022 Saarland state election.

== Education and career ==
Becker was born in 1990, and grew up in the Webenheim and Wolfersheim neighbourhoods of Blieskastel. She attended elementary school im Blickweiler from 1996 to 2000, then the Blieskastel Advanced Realschule until 2006, and graduated from the Von der Leyen-Gymnasium in 2009. Becker then studied law at the Saarland University, passing her first state law examination in 2015. After completing her legal clerkship in Rhineland-Palatinate, she passed her second state law examination two years later. In 2018 she completed a specialist course on administrative law. From 2018 to 2020, she worked as an attorney at the Warken & Colleagues firm in Püttlingen.

== Political career ==
In 2008, at the age of 17, Becker founded the local branch of the Green Youth in Blieskastel. She was elected to the Greens state board two years later, and was speaker of the Saarland Green Youth from 2012 to 2014. She was elected to the Blieskastel city council in 2014, as well as the municipal council in Wolfersheim. The next year, she became chair of the Blieskastel Greens.

Becker was Greens candidate for mayor of Blieskastel in the 2019 local elections, placing third out of three candidates with 27.3% of votes. She was also re-elected to the city council as one of seven Greens. After the elections, she became first deputy to the mayor with responsibility for public order, culture, and tourism.

In 2020, she became employed as an advisor to the managing officer of the Saarland Greens.

At the state party congress on 7 January 2022, Becker was elected as lead candidate for the 2022 Saarland state election. She was one of three candidates alongside state chairwoman Uta Sullenberger and Kiymet Goektas; the former withdrew before the ballot and Becker defeated Goektas with 110 votes to 80. The Greens failed to win seats in the Landtag in the election, falling 23 votes short of the 5% electoral threshold.

== Political positions ==
During the 2022 state election campaign, Becker criticised the grand coalition government for a lack of progress on climate protection in Saarland, particularly renewable energy. In light of the Russian invasion of Ukraine, she stated that Germany needed to pursue energy sovereignty through renewables to reduce reliance on Russian imports and ensure affordable energy prices.

== Personal life ==
Becker lives in the Mitte neighbourhood of Blieskastel with her partner Marc-Denis Toussaint. They have a daughter who was born in 2021.
