= Isolde Ries =

German politician

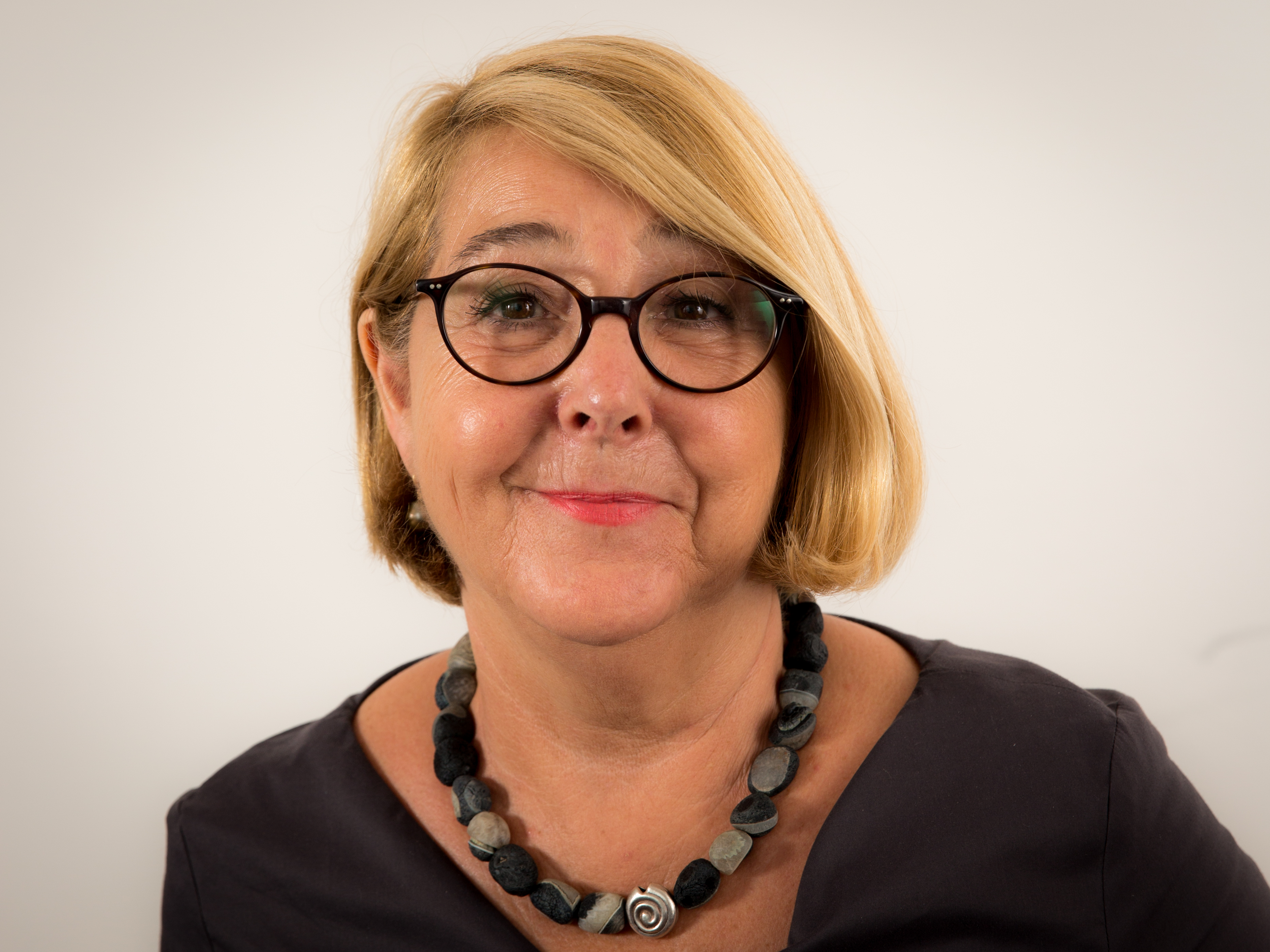

President of the Landtag of Saarland Acting
- In office 16 July 2015 – 11 November 2015
- Deputy: Barbara Spaniol
- Preceded by: Hans Ley
- Succeeded by: Klaus Meiser

Vice President of the Landtag of Saarland
- In office 2009–2022

Member of the Landtag of Saarland
- In office 1990–2022

Personal details
- Born: 24 June 1956 (age 70) Illingen, Saarland, Germany
- Party: SPD (1984–present)

Isolde Ries (born 24 June 1956) is a German politician from the Social Democratic Party of Germany and a former member of the Food, Beverages and Catering Union. She was a member of the Landtag of Saarland from 1990 until 2022.
