= Angelika Hießerich-Peter =

German politician

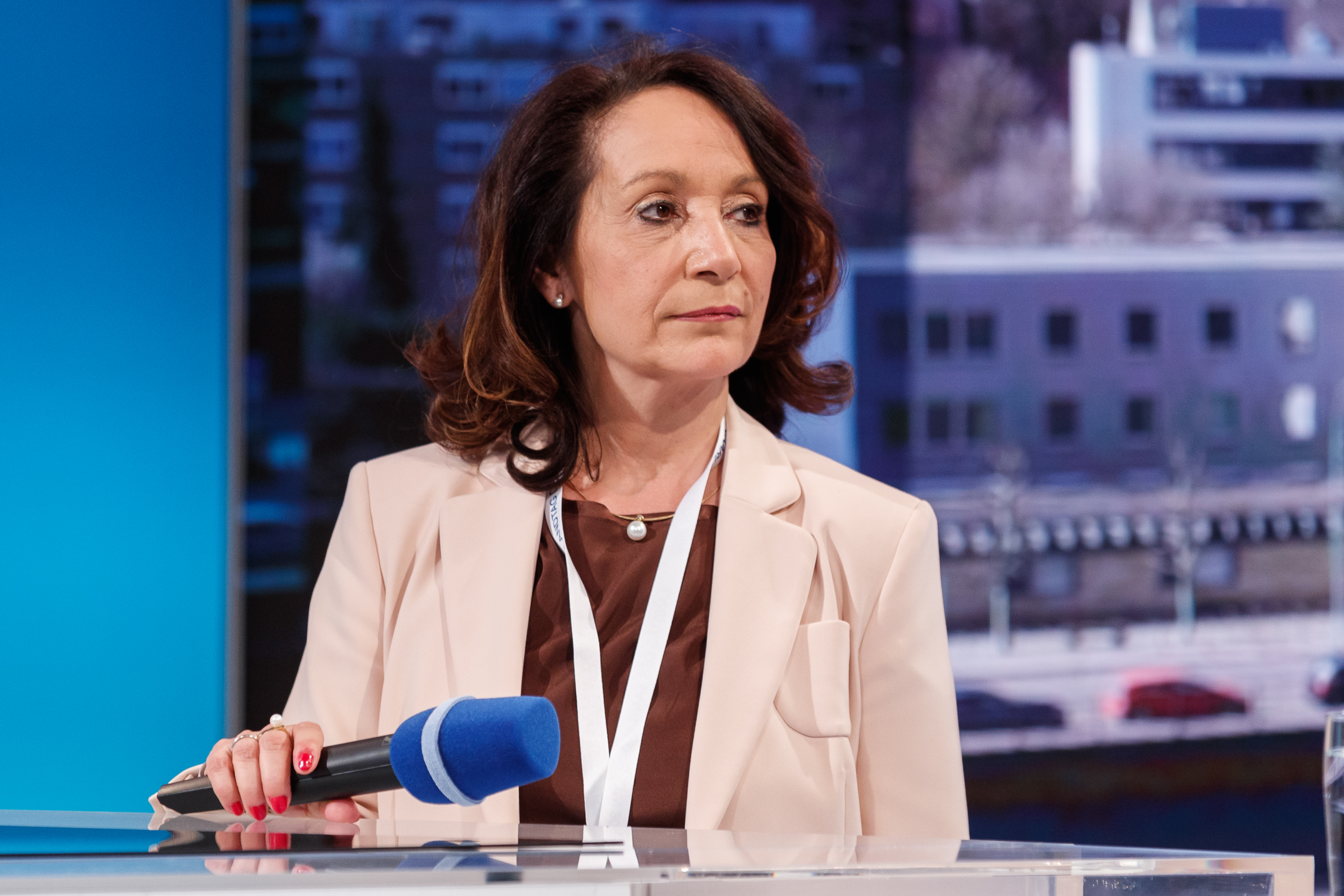
- 2022 at Saarland election
- Born: 1964 (age 61–62); Saarland, West Germany
- Political party: FDP

Angelika Hießerich-Peter (born 1964) is a German entrepreneur and politician of the Free Democratic Party. She was the FDP's lead candidate for the 2022 Saarland state election.

== Education and career ==
Hießerich-Peter was born in Saarland and grew up in her family's hotel business in Heusweiler. After graduating from high school, she trained as a tax clerk and worked in the accounting industry for five years. She also studied at the hotel management school in Saarbrücken and earned certifications as a restaurateur and hotel manager. She spent four years working at hotels in Saarland and Rhineland-Palatinate, becoming a director at age 28. She then worked as a tourism operator for seven years until opening her own hotel in Mettlach in 2001.

== Political career ==
Hießerich-Peter joined the Free Democratic Party in 2016, motivated by concern over the rise of the Alternative for Germany. In 2018, she became deputy state chairwoman and spokeswoman for environment, rural areas and tourism. She is also chair of the FDP women's association in the Saarland and deputy chair of the party's federal budget, finance and tax committee.

In 2019, Hießerich-Peter became the first woman to run for mayor of Merzig. She placed third out of three candidates with 10.1% of votes. She was the FDP's direct candidate for the Saarlouis constituency in the 2021 German federal election, placing fourth with 8.2% of votes.

Ahead of the 2022 Saarland state election, Hießerich-Peter was elected as the FDP's lead candidate, winning 79% of votes at a party congress. The FDP won 4.8% of votes in the election, failing to win any seats.

== Political views ==
Hießerich-Peter defines herself as a liberal and supports incentives to encourage business and industry investment in the Saarland. She states that she sees four key areas in her political work: a reduction of bureaucracy in the economy, better education for youth, effective police and judiciary, and a well-performing health system. She advocates digitalisation in both the private and public sectors, and proposes the establishment of 24-hour daycare centres for children, alongside greater early childhood education and sport. She also supports the expansion of renewable energy, encouraging women's employment and immigration to the Saarland.

== Personal life ==
Hießerich-Peter has an adult daughter and grandchildren.
