= Marion Schiefer =

German politician (born 1975)

Member of the Landtag of Schleswig-Holstein
- Incumbent
- Assumed office 13 June 2023
- Preceded by: Tim Brockmann

Member of the Landtag of Hesse
- In office 1 October 2007 – 5 April 2008
- Preceded by: Birgit Zeimetz
- Constituency: Wiesbaden II

Personal details
- Born: 7 October 1975 (age 50)
- Party: Christian Democratic Union (since 1997)

Marion Schiefer (née Petri; born 7 October 1975) is a German politician serving as a member of the Landtag of Schleswig-Holstein since 2023. From 2013 to 2015, she served as mayor of Trittau. From 2007 to 2008, she was a member of the Landtag of Hesse.
