= Tim Brockmann =

German politician (born 1977)

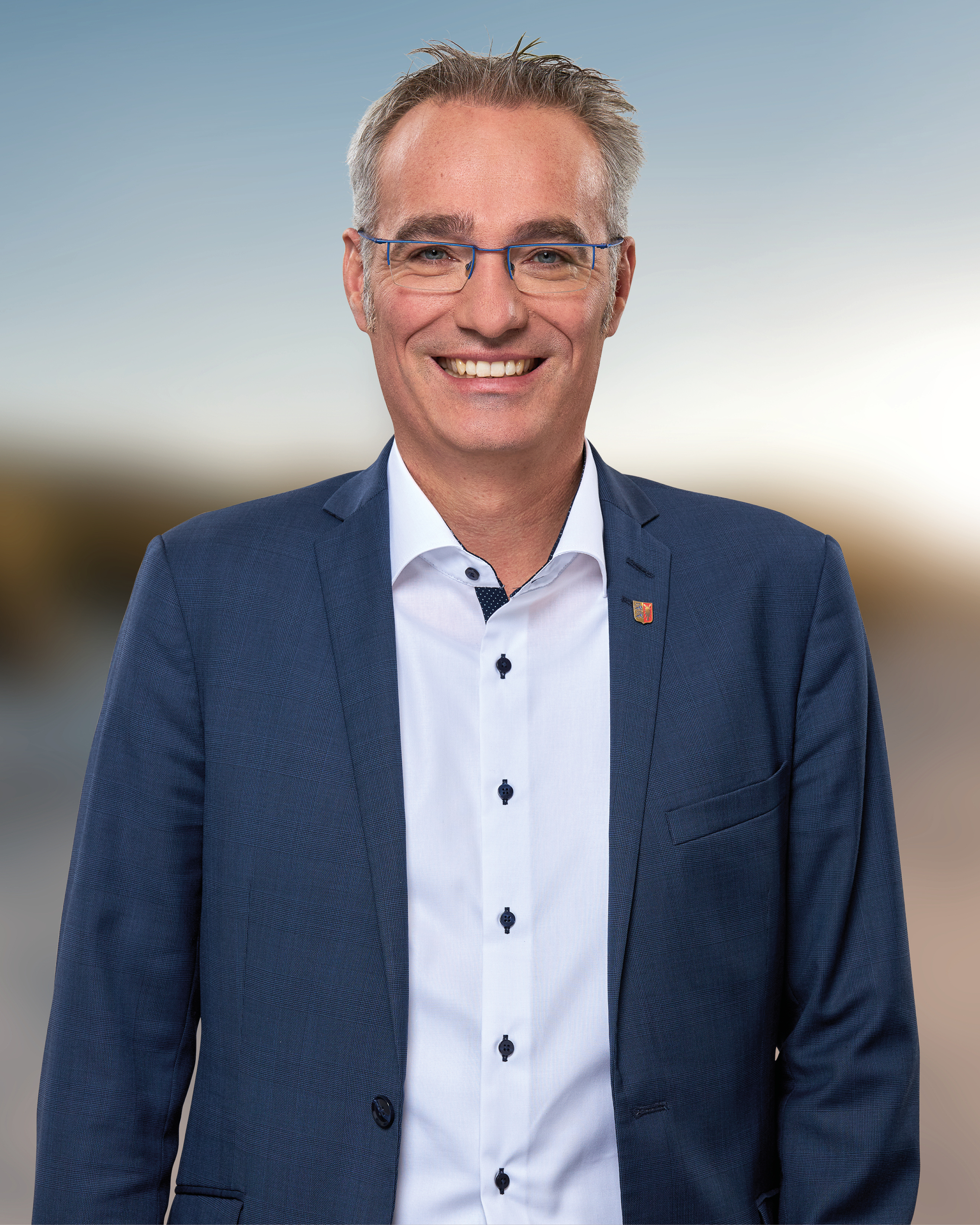
- Brockmann in 2022

Member of the Landtag of Schleswig-Holstein
- In office 6 June 2017 – 7 June 2023
- Preceded by: Peter Sönnichsen
- Succeeded by: Marion Schiefer
- Constituency: Plön-Ostholstein

Personal details
- Born: 14 July 1977 (age 48)
- Party: Christian Democratic Union

Tim Brockmann (born 14 July 1977) is a German politician serving as mayor of Preetz since 2023. From 2017 to 2023, he was a member of the Landtag of Schleswig-Holstein.
