= Tobias Koch (politician) =

German politician (born 1973)

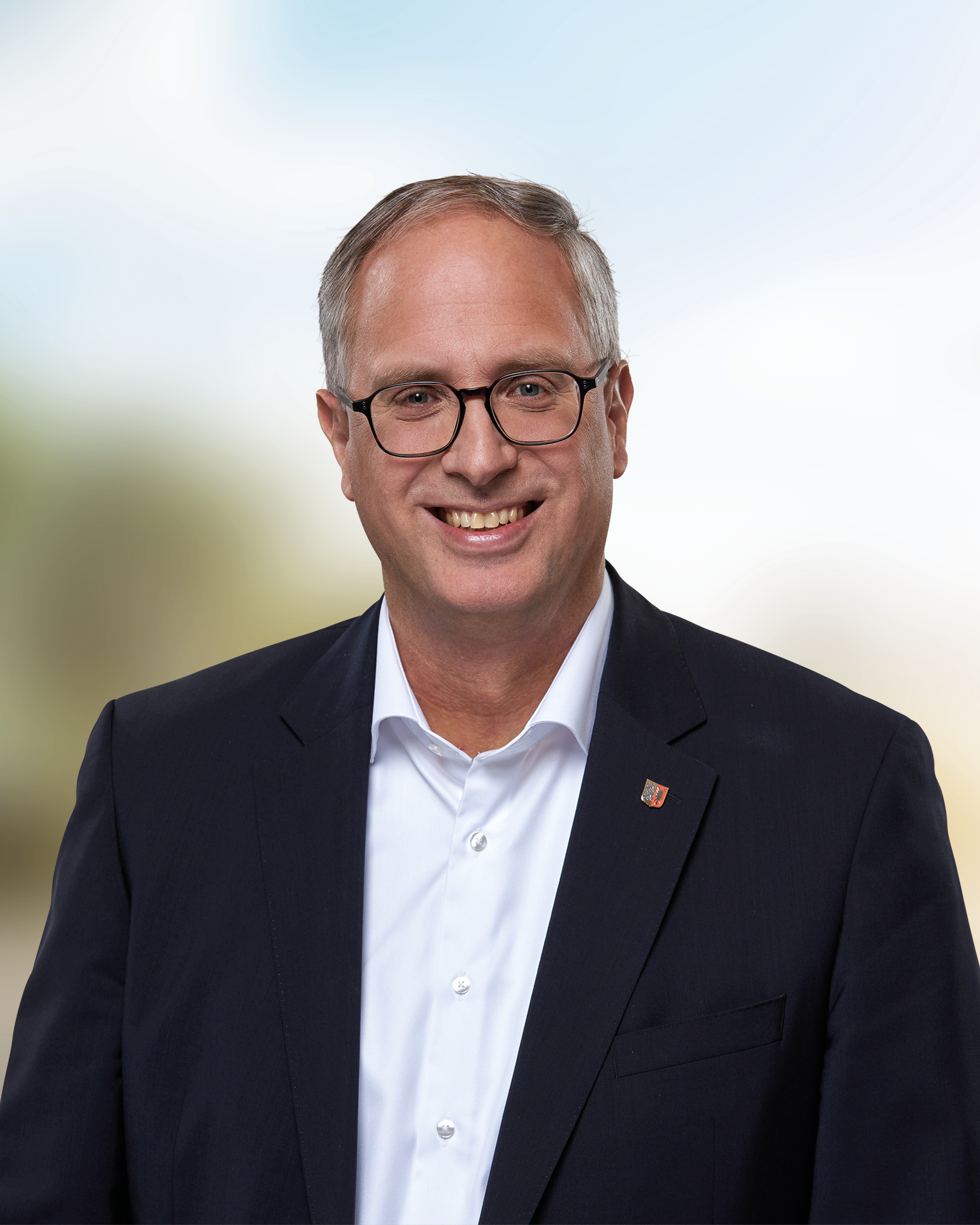
- Koch in 2022

Member of the Landtag of Schleswig-Holstein
- Incumbent
- Assumed office 17 March 2005

Personal details
- Born: 18 October 1973 (age 52)
- Party: Christian Democratic Union

Tobias Koch (born 18 October 1973) is a German politician serving, as a member of the Landtag of Schleswig-Holstein since 2005. He has served as group leader of the Christian Democratic Union since 2017. In the 2022 state election, he was again elected to the state parliament via the direct mandate in the Stormarn-Mitte constituency, receiving 40.3 percent of the vote.
