= Ole-Christopher Plambeck =

German politician (born 1986)

Member of the Landtag of Schleswig-Holstein
- Incumbent
- Assumed office 6 June 2017
- Preceded by: Volker Dornquast
- Constituency: Segeberg-West

Personal details
- Born: 20 January 1986 (age 40)
- Party: Christian Democratic Union (since 2009)

Ole-Christopher Plambeck (born 20 January 1986) is a German politician serving as a member of the Landtag of Schleswig-Holstein since 2017. He has served as chairman of the Christian Democratic Union in Segeberg since 2021.
