= Lukas Kilian =

German politician (born 1986)

Member of the Landtag of Schleswig-Holstein
- Incumbent
- Assumed office 6 June 2017
- Preceded by: Martin Habersaat
- Constituency: Stormarn-Süd

Personal details
- Born: 30 December 1986 (age 39) Hamburg
- Party: Christian Democratic Union

Lukas Kilian (born 30 December 1986 in Hamburg) is a German politician serving as a member of the Landtag of Schleswig-Holstein since 2017. He has served as secretary general of the Christian Democratic Union in Schleswig-Holstein since 2023.
