= Barbara Spaniol =

German politician (born 1963)

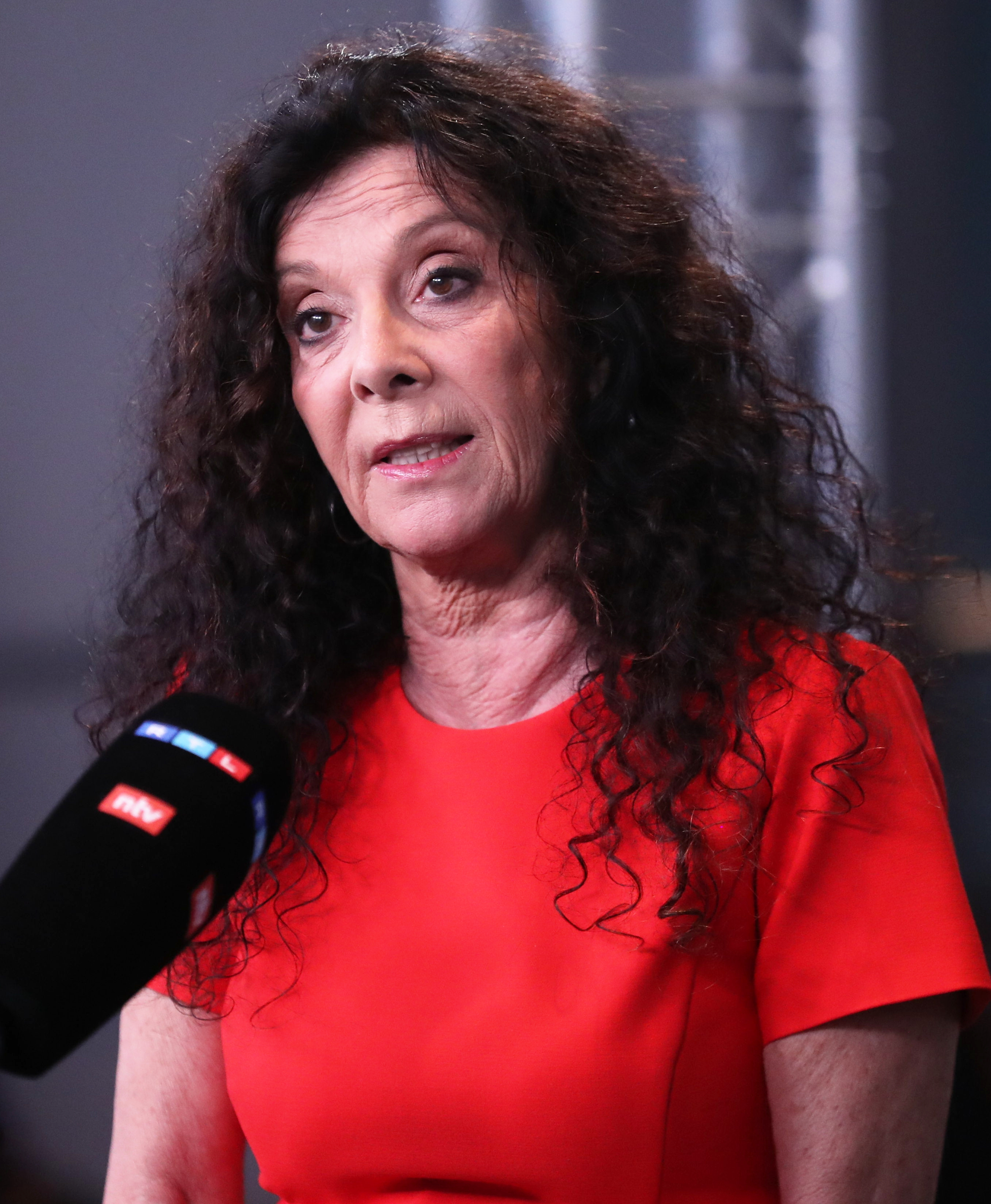
- Spaniol in 2022

Vice President of the Landtag of Saarland
- In office 16 October 2013 – 18 November 2021 Serving with Isolde Ries & Günter Heinrich (from 2017)

Member of the Landtag of Saarland
- In office 5 September 2004 – 25 April 2022
- Parliamentary group: The Greens (2004–07); None (2007–09); The Left (2009–21); Saar-Linke (2021–22)
- Constituency: Neunkirchen

Personal details
- Born: 17 September 1963 (age 63) Eppelborn, Saarland, West Germany
- Party: The Greens (1996–2007); The Left (2007–)

Barbara Spaniol (born 17 September 1963) is a German politician of The Left who was a member of the Landtag of Saarland from 2004 to 2022. Starting her career in The Greens, she joined The Left in 2007. From 2013 to 2021 she was one of the vice presidents of the Landtag. She served as The Left's lead candidate during the 2022 Saarland state election.

== Education and career ==
Spaniol graduated from high school in 1982 and then studied librarianship and information science in Cologne, graduating as a librarian in 1985. From 1989 to 1992, she completed additional studies at the Academy for Office Management in Grünstadt. In 1990, she obtained a teaching qualification in word processing and subsequently became a state-certified teacher of office technology in 1991.

From 1985 to 2004, Spaniol worked as a member of the administrative staff of the Landtag of Saarland. In 1987, she became a civil servant and held the positions of deputy head of the Department of Information Services and head of the Landtag Library. From 1997 to 2004, Spaniol was women's representative at the Landtag; from 2002 to 2004 she was spokeswoman for the working group of state women's representatives.

== Political career ==
=== The Greens ===
Spaniol joined Alliance 90/The Greens in 1996. During her time in the party, she was a member of the Saarland branch's state executive committee, district executive committee, state council, and the federal women's council. She was elected to the Homburg city council and the Landtag of Saarland in the 2004 Saarland state election, where she was secretary of the Greens parliamentary faction. She was also spokeswoman for education, culture, and science, as well as European and women's policy. She was also second secretary of the Landtag.

=== The Left ===
On 6 August 2007, Spaniol left the Greens and joined The Left. She sat as a non-attached member of the Landtag for the remainder of the parliamentary term. Following her exit from the Greens faction, the Landtag elected Claudia Willger to replace her as second secretary of the Landtag on 29 August. Spaniol unsuccessfully filed a lawsuit over the move, claiming that she had been elected to serve for the entire duration of the legislative period.

After joining The Left, Spaniol became spokeswoman for education and speaker of the party's state working group on education. She was also elected chairwoman of Saarpfalz-Kreis district association and speaker for the board of the Homburg city association. In 2009, she became chairwoman of The Left faction in the Homburg city council.

Spaniol was re-elected to the Landtag in the 2009 Saarland state election along with ten other deputies for The Left. She became vice-chair of the new Left parliamentary faction and spokeswoman for education, media, and women's policy. In October 2013, she was elected second vice president of the Landtag, succeeding the late Rolf Linsler. After the 2017 Saarland state election, she continued in office as third vice president.

In the long-running party dispute between Saarland Left chairman Thomas Lutze and parliamentary leader Oskar Lafontaine, Spaniol was considered an ally of Lutze. On 2 November 2021, she was expelled from The Left parliamentary faction upon request of four of its six members. Group secretary Jochen Flackus claimed that Spaniol had "supported the public attacks by the state chairman against the Left faction" and had failed to "protect her own faction and colleagues." She described the move as "incomprehensible, inappropriate and unfair" and stated that she wanted to continue her political work. On 10 November, she founded the Saar-Linke faction with Dagmar Ensch-Engel, who previously resigned from The Left faction in 2018. She also vacated her position as vice president of the Landtag.

Ahead of the 2022 Saarland state election, Spaniol was elected as the Left's top candidate in the Neunkirchen constituency with 98% of votes. On 21 November, she was also elected lead candidate for the party's statewide list with 85.1% support. The Left won 2.6% of votes in the election and lost all their seats in the Landtag.

== Other affiliations ==
Spaniol was a member of the supervisory board of the Musikschule Homburg gGmbH from 2014 to 2019. Until March 2017 she was on the board of trustees of the Foundation for Franco-German Cultural Cooperation. Since March 2018, she has been a member of the board of directors of Studentenwerk in Saarland; she was previously a deputy member of the board.

She is also a member of the Education and Science Workers' Union, Mehr Demokratie e.V., the Sports and Games Club SSV Homburg Er-bach, the Interest Group Erbach-Berliner Wohnpark in Homburg, and the support group Pro Familia Neunkirchen.

== Personal life ==
Spaniol is married to Saarbrücken physician and politician Andreas Pollak and has one child. Pollak was himself a member of the Landtag for the Greens from 1994 to 1999. Before Spaniol defected to The Left, Pollak also ended his political activities with the Greens.
