= Thomas Lutze =

German politician (born 1969)

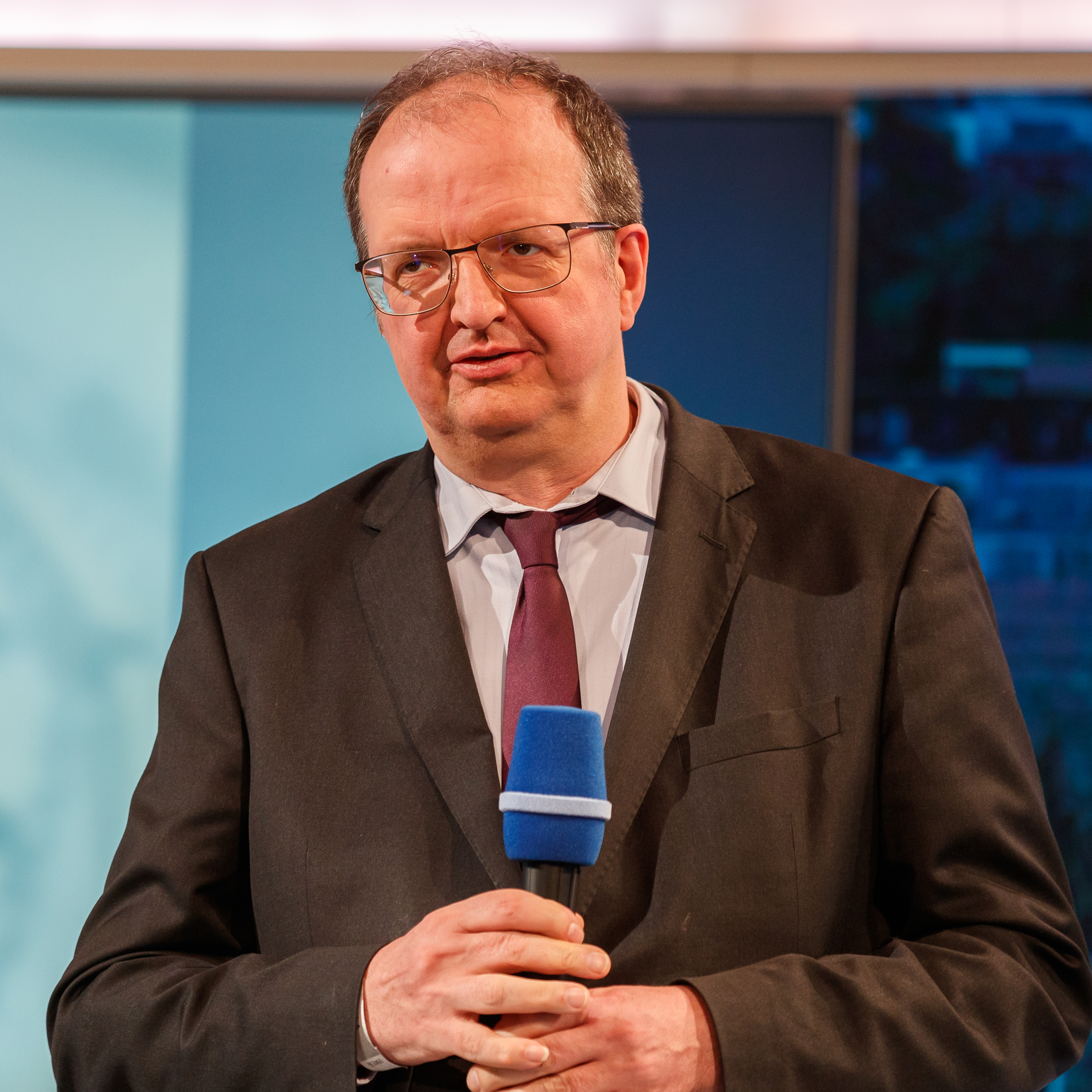
- Thomas Lutze in 2022

Leader of The Left in the Saarland
- In office 29 September 2019 – 11 September 2022
- Preceded by: Jochen Flackus
- Succeeded by: Barbara Spaniol

Member of the Bundestag for Saarland
- In office 27 October 2009 – 24 March 2025

Personal details
- Born: 23 August 1969 (age 57) Elsterwerda, East Germany (now Germany)
- Party: The Left / SPD

Thomas Lutze (born 23 August 1969) is a German politician who represents the Social Democratic Party of Germany. Previously, he was a member of the Left Party. Thomas Lutze has served as a member of the Bundestag from the state of Saarland from 2009 to 2023, and has represented Berlin since October 2023.

== Early life and career ==
Born in Elsterwerda, Brandenburg, Lutze grew up in Leipzig. In 1986, he completed his general secondary schooling, and three years later he completed his vocational training as a mechanical engineer in a foundry in Leipzig, which was linked to his A-levels. He then worked there as a repair fitter. In 1990 and 1991, he worked as an assembly fitter at a temporary employment agency. From 1991 to 1995 he studied design and production engineering at the University of Saarland.

From 1995 to 2002, Lutze was a regional office employee of the PDS parliamentary group in Saarbrücken. From 2003 to 2005, he retrained as an office administrator in a Saarbrücken furniture store. From 2005, he was a constituency employee of Oskar Lafontaine in Saarlouis.

== Political career ==
Lutze first became a member of the Bundestag in the 2009 German federal election. He is a member of the Committee for Economics and Energy. In his group he is a spokesman for economic policy.

In March 2021, Lutze was the subject of an internal controversy within his party. Since September 2022 he is no longer the leader of The Left in the state of Saarland. He has been succeeded by Barbara Spaniol.

In October 2023, Lutze resigned his membership from the Left Party and instead joined the Social Democratic Party (SPD), citing that "he no longer perceived the Left as a 'corrective' of socially undesirable developments". He retained his seat in the Bundestag, but was rejected from the Saarland SPD, and instead was accepted into the Berlin SPD, specifically the Kreuzberg-Friedrichshain chapter.

In October 2024, Lutze announced that he would not stand in the 2025 federal elections but instead resign from active politics by the end of the parliamentary term.
