= Brexit in popular culture =

Cultural depictions of the UK's withdrawal from the EU

Brexit is the commonly used term for the United Kingdom's withdrawal from the European Union on 31 January 2020, which resulted from a referendum on 23 June 2016. This article details the mostly critical response to this decision in the visual art, novels, theatre, and film.

== Background ==
The British government led by David Cameron held a referendum on the issue in 2016; a majority voted to leave the European Union. On 29 March 2017, Theresa May's administration invoked Article 50 of the Treaty on the European Union in a letter to the President of the European Council, Donald Tusk. The UK was set to leave on 29 March 2019, unless the Brexit Withdrawal agreement was adopted by the House of Commons, in which case the UK would have left in May 2019. With the failure to ratify the withdrawal agreement by the British Parliament, Prime Minister Theresa May negotiated a further extension until 31 October 2019. Later that year the withdrawal was delayed a further 3 months and, struggling to pass his renegotiated deal in the way he wished, Prime Minister Boris Johnson called the 2019 general election on 12 December 2019. The election resulted in the Conservatives receiving a majority of 80 seats; the UK subsequently left the European Union at 23:00 GMT on 31 January 2020.

== Artists' sentiments toward Brexit ==
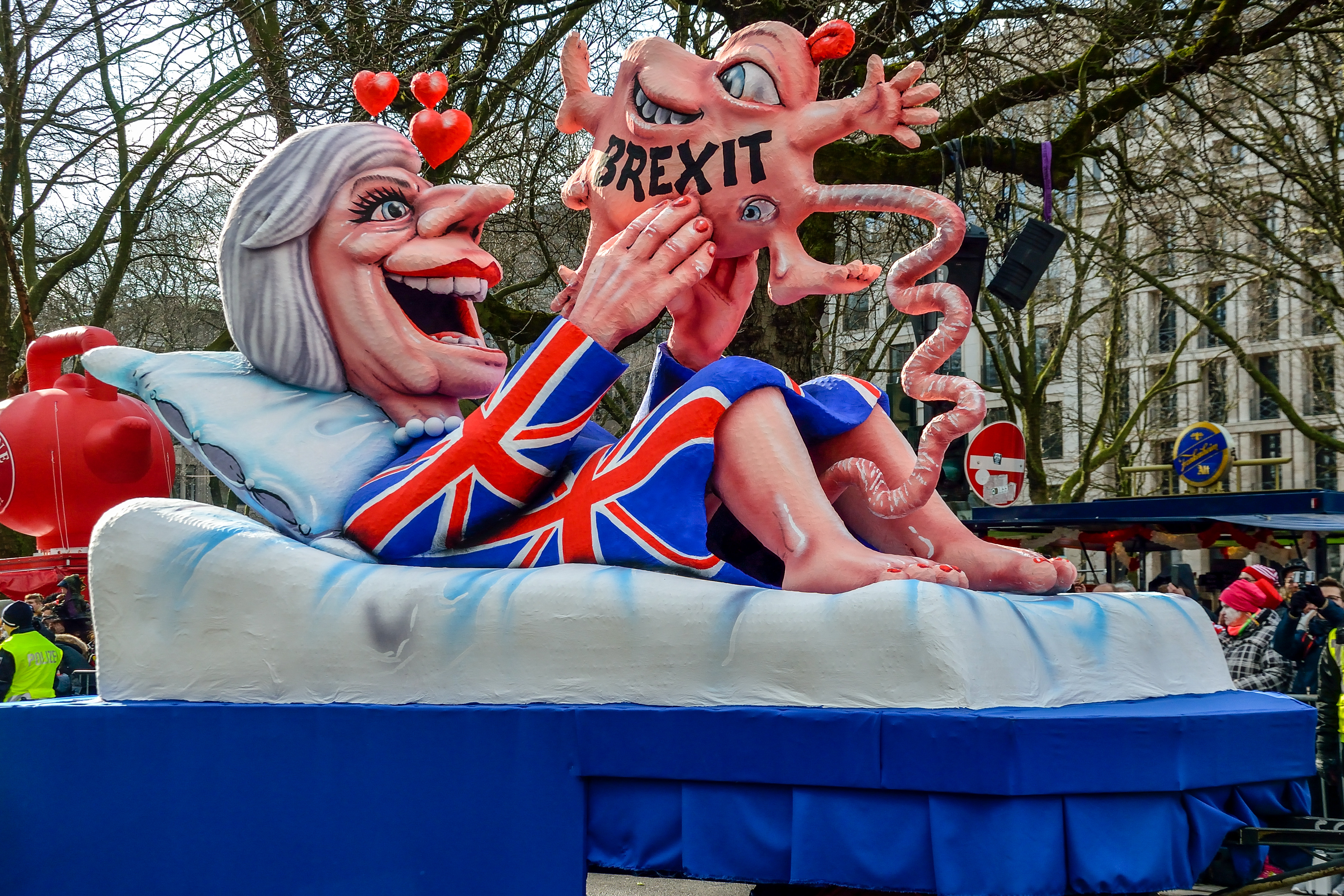
Düsseldorf carnival parade in February 2018

The response of artists and writers to Brexit has tended to be negative, reflecting a reported overwhelming percentage of people involved in Britain's creative industries voting against leaving the European Union. The visual artist Bob and Roberta Smith, writing in The Guardian newspaper during 2017, typifies this response:

Post-Brexit, we face a dissolution of our museums and galleries comparable in its devastation to that visited on England in the 1530s, as philistine politicians slash budgets. Art schools and the arts in schools will be further diminished in a wave of manufactured disdain for so-called elitists.

Gilbert and George, Morrissey, Roger Daltrey and Ringo Starr are among the creative figures who support Brexit.

== Brexit in the visual arts ==
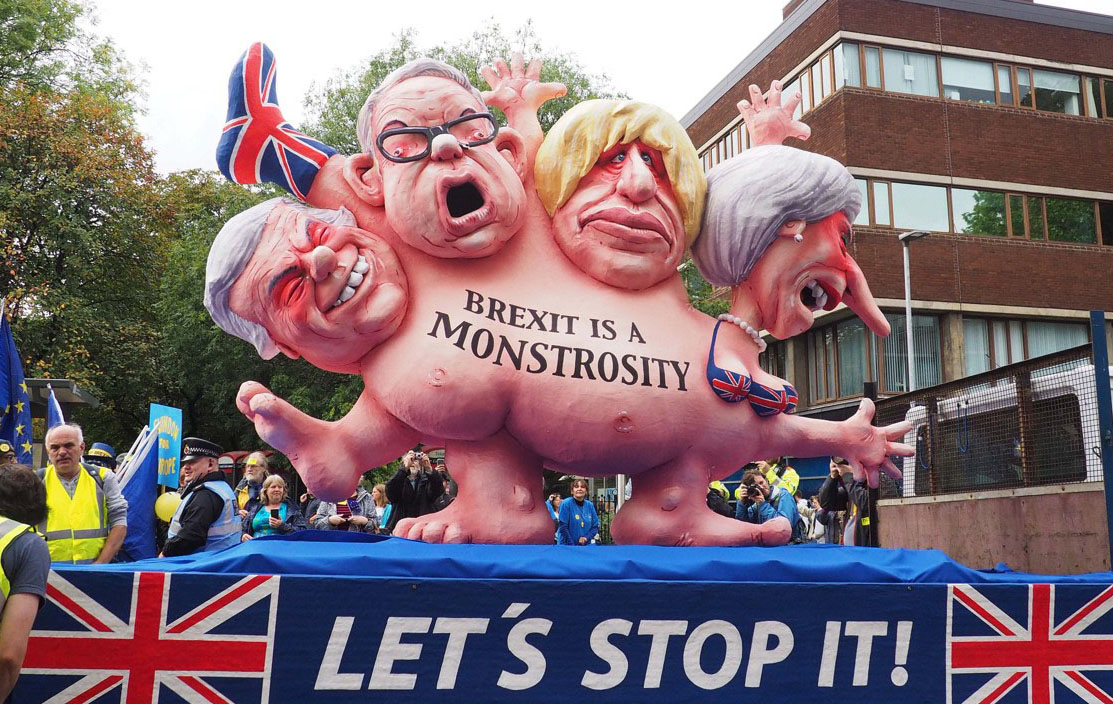
Anti-Brexit protesters in Manchester

Responses by visual artists to Brexit include a mural, painted in May 2017, by the secretive graffiti artist Banksy near the ferry port at Dover in southern England. It shows a workman using a chisel to chip off one of the stars on the European Union Flag. In August 2019 the mural was found to have been painted over with white paint and covered in scaffolding.

In his 2017 art exhibition at the Serpentine Gallery in London, the artist Grayson Perry showed a series of ceramic, tapestry and other works of art dealing with the divisions in Britain during the Brexit campaign and in its aftermath. This included two large ceramic pots, Perry called his Brexit Vases, standing on plinths ten feet apart, on the first of which were scenes involving pro-European British citizens, and on the second scenes involving anti-European British citizens. These were derived from what Perry called his 'Brexit tour of Britain'.

In 2019, The Guardian commissioned Anish Kapoor to create a piece of art in response to the political climate around Brexit. Kapoor's work, entitled A Brexit, A Broxit, We All Fall Down, was an image of Britain with "a gory rip stretching from Glasgow to the south coast".

Jason deCaires Taylor installed an artwork called Pride of Brexit at the base of the White Cliffs of Dover in 2019. It consisted of three lions, a national symbol, "emaciated and exhausted" lying on the sand. Taylor said they were meant to be "a monument to one of the most unpatriotic events Britain has ever seen". They were later reinstalled on the Thames embankment across from the Palace of Westminster.

Artist Clemens Wilhelm was commissioned by Scottish arts organisation Deveron Projects to mark the departure of the UK from the EU. His weeping willow Brexit Tree would be planted on the day the UK left the EU as a "symbol of loss and healing". It was planted on 31 January 2020 in a ceremony that included participation of Richard Demarco and A. L. Kennedy. A film work of the project will be released in January 2021.

== Brexit in novels ==
The day after the referendum, gay niche erotica author Chuck Tingle self-published the 4,000-word book Pounded by the Pound: Turned Gay by the Socioeconomic Implications of Britain Leaving the European Union, in which a large coin from the future comes to see the main character Alex to explain him the danger of Brexit, and together they go back to the past to sway voters against voting to leave the European Union, "proving that all you need is love."

Peter Preston's 1998 novel, The 51st State, predicted a UK Prime Minister, following his father's dying wishes, withdrawing the UK from the EU, then joining the United States.

Ali Smith's 2016 novel Autumn has been described by the Financial Times as the first serious Brexit novel.

One of the first novels to engage with a post-Brexit Britain was Rabbitman by Michael Paraskos (published 9 March 2017). Rabbitman is a dark comic fantasy in which the events that lead to the election of a right-wing populist American president, and Britain's vote to leave the European Union, were the result of a series of Faustian pacts with the Devil. As a result, Rabbitman is set partly in a post-Brexit Britain in which society has collapsed and people are dependent on European Union food aid.

Mark Billingham's Love Like Blood (published 1 June 2017) is a crime thriller in which Brexit sees a rise in xenophobic hate crime. In the novel The Remains of the Way (published 6 June 2017), David Boyle imagines Brexit was a conspiracy led by a forgotten government quango, still working away in Whitehall, originally set up by Thomas Cromwell in the 16th century during the reign of King Henry VIII, and now dedicated to a Protestant Brexit.

Post-Brexit Britain is also the setting for Amanda Craig's The Lie of the Land (published 13 June 2017), a satirical novel set ten years after the vote to leave the European Union, in which an impoverished middle class couple from Islington in north London are forced to move from the heart of the pro-European Union capital to the heart of the pro-Brexit countryside in Devon.

Brexit is also the baseline for Douglas Board's comic political thriller Time of Lies (published 23 June 2017). In this novel, the first post-Brexit general election in 2020 is won by a violent right-wing former football hooligan called Bob Grant. Board charts the response to this of the hitherto pro-European Union metropolitan political elite.

Stanley Johnson's Kompromat (published 23 July 2017) is a political thriller that suggests the vote to leave the European Union was a result of Russian influence on the referendum, although Johnson has insisted his book is not intended to point the finger at Russia's secret services, but is "just meant to be fun".

Jonathan Coe's Middle England (published 8 November 2018) is a state-of-the-nation novel which re-introduces some of the author's earlier characters from The Rotters' Club (2001) and The Closed Circle (2004), and moves from the election of the coalition government in 2010, through the riots of 2011, the 2012 Olympics, the 2016 referendum and its aftermath, ending in 2018.

Night of the Party by Tracey Mathias is set in the UK after Brexit. With a far-right party in power, only British-born people are permitted to remain in the country, and the book examines the consequences of populist and isolationist policies on the protagonist and his friends.

Rachel Churcher's Battle Ground series is Young Adult dystopia, set in a totalitarian near-future UK after Brexit and Scottish independence.

Sam Byers' Perfidious Albion is set in East Anglia, and examines power, influence, and nationalism in the UK after Brexit.

Chris Mullin's The Friends of Harry Perkins, the sequel to A Very British Coup, is set in the aftermath of Brexit, said to be neither apocalyptic nor an economic miracle. It follows Fred Thompson's journey to becoming Labour leader and eventually Prime Minister, with one of his chief aims being to reverse Brexit.

== Brexit in theatre ==
In theatre, in June 2017 the National Theatre in London presented a play by Carol Ann Duffy, entitled, My Country; a work in progress. An allegorical work, the play uses the device of a convention called by the goddess Britannia who is concerned about the future of the British people. The play differs from some artistic responses in that Duffy and the National Theatre-based the attitudes of the characters on stage in part on the responses to interviews, conducted by the regional offices of the UK Arts Councils, with ordinary people, but excluding responses from London and the south-east of England, where most people voted not to leave the European Union. As a result, according to Dominic Cavendish, writing in the Daily Telegraph newspaper, "the bias is towards the Leave camp".

However the play, that only featured British voices, was an example of how the British theatre artists largely ignored the perspective of migrants, contributing to “the paradox of simultaneous hyper- and in-visibility of immigrants in the UK” in the Brexit debate. Much more interesting were contributions from the UK-based migrant artists “in which migrant artists claim[ed] agency over their representation within public spaces and create a platform for a new social imagination that can facilitate transnational and trans-local encounters, multicultural democratic spaces, sense of commonality, and solidarity."

Rosaura (an adaptation of Life Is a Dream by Pedro Calderón de la Barca) created by actors Paula Rodríguez and Sandra Arpa was performed in London just after the Brexit referendum. It reimagines Calderón's story by focusing on Rosaura, and changes several details in the play (including adding references to Brexit). Moscow (where Rosaura is from) is changed to 'Hispania' and the Polish royal court is changed to the 'Court of Europe'. Instead of Astolfo and Segismundo battling, they compete in a "reality show-style election" where Astolfo is characterised as similar to Boris Johnson.

An Evening with an Immigrant is an autobiographical piece by a British-based Nigerian poet and performer Inua Ellams. It premiered in July 2016 at the Soho Theatre in London. Ellams recalls his life between Nigeria, the UK, and Ireland and comments on the British colonial past and its role in the current migrant crisis. Bubble Revolution by Polish playwright Julia Holewińska, directed by John Currivan and co-created and performed by Kasia Lech at the 2016 Edinburgh Fringe Festival focused on growing-up in communist and post-communist Poland and experiences of speaking English as a foreign language. The three productions used “memories rooted in their native and non-native cultures as a platform for the audience to engage with transnational conditions in today's Europe and the UK, and explore these and spectators’ own experiences through a translocal gaze”.

The Fishamble play 'The Alternative' is an Ireland-based satire of both Brexit and the Irish unification question, and imagines an alternate history in which Home Rule is successfully implemented in Ireland in the 1910s, leading to Ireland remaining part of the United Kingdom to the present day. The play centers around a campaign in which Ireland is voting on whether to declare independence (Vote Leave) or to remain part of the UK (Vote Remain). The play had a limited run in theatres across the Republic of Ireland and Northern Ireland.

== Brexit in film and television ==
In 2016, the television director Martin Durkin wrote and directed an 81-minute long documentary film titled Brexit: The Movie, which advocated with the withdrawal of the United Kingdom from the European Union. The film was produced by the production company Wag TV with a budget of £300,000. The production costs were sourced primarily through crowdfunding via Kickstarter alongside a £50,000 contribution from the hedge fund Spitfire Capital. In May 2016, the film premiered in Leicester Square, with notable figures such as Nigel Farage and David Davis (who later became Secretary of State for Exiting the European Union) in attendance.

A documentary film was released in 2018, called Postcards from the 48%, which is described on the film's website as: "A documentary film made by and featuring those who voted Remain, the 48%, to show the other 27 EU Member States that it was far from a landslide victory and just why we are fighting to stay part of the EU". A review on Shadows on the Wall called it "a comprehensive, factual exploration of the issue, grappling with the referendum, its ramifications and the way the split vote has fractured British society."

A two-hour television drama film written by James Graham and directed by Toby Haynes, named Brexit: The Uncivil War (simply Brexit in the US), was released in January 2019. It depicts the lead-up to the 2016 referendum through the activities of the strategists behind the Vote Leave campaign, that prompted the United Kingdom to exit the European Union. It aired on Channel 4 in the United Kingdom on 7 January, and aired on HBO in the United States on 19 January. Benedict Cumberbatch stars as Dominic Cummings, the Campaign Director of the official designated Brexit-supporting group, Vote Leave.

The TV series Years and Years (2019) also reflects post-Brexit dystopian society focused on the Manchester-based Lyons family.

The 2021 British German satirical comedy film Alice, Through the Looking is a "Brexit referencing Alice in Wonderland retelling" combined with an essay film. It is adapted and directed by Adam Donen from Lewis Carroll's novels. The film's narrative takes place on the day before the Brexit Referendum. In this retelling, Alice is not a 7 year old child, but a 20 year old exchange student who searches for her lost boyfriend, nicknamed "rabbit", in the days following the referendum. She accidentally stumbles into a bizarre version of London. Saskia Axten stars as Alice, Vanessa Redgrave as the Narrator, Carol Cleveland as the Queen of Hearts, and Steven Berkoff as a meta "executive producer" character. The film premiered at POFF Film Festival, Talinn, Estonia, in 2021, and was seen at festivals in the UK and US in 2022 and 2023.

== Brexit in video games ==
In the football management simulation Football Manager 2017 and its successor Football Manager 2018, Brexit is an event within the game. There are multiple possible outcomes decided by chance reflecting both a soft Brexit and a hard Brexit. Consequences of a hard Brexit are, among others, EU football players needing a working visa to play in English teams. Plague Inc: Evolved also includes Brexit as an in-game event with scenarios including a 'soft', 'hard' or 'brutal' Brexit as well as the potential for Britain to remain in the EU.

Not Tonight is a role-playing game set in an alternate timeline shortly after Brexit. The player takes the role of a European-born immigrant who must survive under a far-right British government to avoid deportation.

Watch Dogs: Legion is an action adventure game set in a post-Brexit dystopian London, with Britain having become a surveillance state under Albion.

Pokémon Sword & Shield is set in a region inspired by the United Kingdom. When it was announced that a number of Pokémon introduced in previous games would be unobtainable in this entry, fans began protesting the decision and referred to it as "Dexit".

== Brexit on social media ==
Arguably, nowhere exhibited a greater display of opinion surrounding Brexit than online social media platforms. Social media had a significant short-term influence on the referendum result and supports the argument that Brexit was not inevitable but was in fact a response to a multitude of influences and events in the build-up. For example, a working paper from the National Bureau of Economic Research found that fake Twitter accounts could have added 1.76% in the pro-leave voting share.

In 2018, an anonymous Twitter account called @BorderIrish gained notability tweeting as the Irish border in the first person, and the implications that Brexit would have for it.

== Brexit in music ==
The 2016 track "Hey Kids (Bumaye)" by American rap duo Run the Jewels features the line "Run the Jewels'll make last breaths Brexit".

Billy Bragg's 2017 album Bridges Not Walls contains several references to Brexit, both overt and more subtle. The opening track "The Sleep of Reason" includes the lyrics "Lies ride in style on a big red bus", referring to the Vote Leave campaign bus. Track 5 on the album ("Not Everything that Counts Can Be Counted") contains the verse:

People have had enough of experts

And their inconvenient facts

Here's what the media really won't tell ya

Exactly who it is that's taking control back

This is a reference to Michael Gove's comments regarding experts. The sixth track "Full English Brexit", is described on Genius.com as "a satirical song from the perspective of an English person talking themselves into Brexit".

In November 2018, The Good, the Bad & the Queen released Merrie Land, which reflects on the United Kingdom's relationship with the European Union and being British during the prelude to Brexit. The lyrics are complemented by the loping basslines, sparse guitar, and intricate drumming, which contribute to the overall dark sonic ambience of the album.

The Breunion Boys are a Dutch boy band created by artist Julia Veldman in response to Brexit. The group's debut song, "Britain Come Back" was released in December 2018.

In October 2019, along with a group of musicians calling themselves Article 54, the journalist and musician Rhodri Marsden released The Hustle, an eight track concept disco symphony album with tracks inspired by the UK's Brexit negotiations. Tracks from the album were debuted on the 10 October edition of the BBC One political programme Brexitcast. It then appeared on the iTunes UK Album Chart, where it quickly began to outsell ABBA Gold. The album appeared on the Official UK Charts on 18 October, debuting at number 56 on the download chart.

In March 2020, Riz Ahmed — the popular actor and one half of the rap duo Swet Shop Boys — released his first solo album, The Long Goodbye. It has been described as a "concept album that reframes the UK's relationship with British Asians as a "toxic and abusive" love affair that has reached its breaking point in the wake of Brexit and the rise of the far-right." It is the quintessential break-up album—except that the breakup baggage is "the weight of colonial trauma" and that the ex-girlfriend Britney stands in for "Britannia".

Other Brexit-related songs include a parody of Ode to Joy featured in John Oliver's program, Fascinating Aida's "So Sorry Scotland", and "The French Brexit Song".

== Brexit in food and drink ==
Brexitovka, also known as the Brexit Vodka, is a premium craft British vodka from Norfolk in England which commemorates Brexit. It is the first brand of spirit to explicitly commemorate Brexit. Brexitovka was launched by an Anglo-Polish eurosceptic Przemek de Skuba Skwirczynski at the February 2017 UKIP conference with the slogan "Celebrate Brexit in style or drown your sorrows with Brexitovka". The company was struck off the Companies House register in April 2018, before the UK left the EU.

In October 2020, the 'Brexit Biscuit', shortbread with a half-EU flag, half-Union Jack design, was launched. It came in a wrapper printed with the text of Article 50 and were meant to be snappable.

== Brexit in commemorative stamps ==
In 2018, Boris Johnson sparked governmental outrage by backing calls to introduce a commemorative Brexit stamp. The Postal Services Minister Margot James branded the proposed commemorative stamps as 'divisive'. Johnson told The Sun: "Leaving the European Union will be a monumental moment in British history, so let's deliver a commemorative stamp that shows the world we've got Brexit licked". Royal Mail issued a statement saying that it "does not intend to issue a stamp to mark the UK's exit from the EU". Conservative MP Nigel Evans criticised the company for "playing politics".

Austria's post service printed 140,000 commemorative stamps to mark the event of Britain's departure from the European Union. However, the commemorative stamps had to be reprinted due to changes to the official date for exit.

== Use in the dictionary ==
The noun Brexit was added to the Oxford English Dictionary (OED) in 2016, which identified it as originating among economists in 2012. A senior editor said it had become widely used with "impressive" speed, having proved itself more popular than "Brixit", or the more accurate "UKexit". The editor added: "Brexit's inclusion in the OED December update within five years of being coined is highly unusual... by late 2016 it was a global word." Other variations began to appear such as Brexiteer, and brexit as a verb.

In October 2019, Académie Goncourt chairman Bernard Pivot tweeted (in translation): "I propose to insert the word 'brexit' (without capital letter) into the French language. It will indicate a cacophonous and insoluble debate, a bloody shambolic reunion or assembly. Example: the meeting of the joint owners ended in brexit." (The inclusion of the British expletive is supported two-fold by the Collins-Robert French Dictionary.)
