= Martin Durkin (director) =

English television producer and director

Martin Richard Durkin (born January 1962, in South Shields) is an English television producer and director. He is best known for directing The Great Global Warming Swindle (2007), which promotes climate change denial, and Brexit: The Movie (2016), which advocates for the United Kingdom's withdrawal from the European Union.

He has produced, directed and executive-produced programmes covering the arts, science, history, entertainment, features and social documentaries. A number of his documentaries have attracted controversy or derision, particularly those that posit conspiracy theories or ignore significant bodies of evidence in order to push a particular viewpoint.

== Documentaries ==
=== Against Nature ===
In 1997, Channel 4 broadcast Durkin's documentary series Against Nature, which attacked the environmental movement as being a threat to personal freedom and for crippling economic development.

The UK's then broadcasting regulator the Independent Television Commission received 151 complaints from viewers and interviewees featured in the programme with four complaints upheld. In its report on the series, the ITC rejected 147 complaints that mainly were concerned with fairness and misrepresentation, stating that "the programmes' line that green ideologies were, at least in some respects, open to criticism on both scientific and humanitarian grounds, was a legitimate approach". It stated that environmentalists had been permitted a fair chance to air their side of the story in the televised debates that followed the broadcast.

The ITC stated that four complaints were upheld because: "the programmes breached the Programme Code in respect of the failure to make the four interviewees adequately aware of the nature of the programmes, and the way their contributions were edited." For these reasons, Channel 4 later issued a public apology on prime time television. According to The Independent, Durkin "accepts the charge of misleading contributors, but describes the verdict of distortion as 'complete tosh'".

=== Equinox ===
Durkin produced two documentaries for Channel 4's science strand Equinox. In 1998 he produced "Storm in a D-Cup", which argued that the medical dangers of silicone breast implants had been exaggerated for political reasons and highlighting evidence that implants may even carry medical benefits. In 2000 he produced The Rise and Fall of GM defending the science of genetic modification.

The 1998 documentary on breast implants was originally developed for the BBC but was eventually produced for Channel 4 after the BBC declined to commission it; the BBC's in-house researcher concluded that Durkin had ignored evidence contradicting his claims in the programme. Environmental activist and writer George Monbiot wrote "Neither Martin Durkin nor, extraordinarily, Charles Furneaux, the commissioning editor of the science series Equinox, has a science background. They don't need one, for science on Channel 4 has been reduced to a crude manifesto for corporate libertarianism."

=== The Rise and Fall of GM ===
This documentary, which argues in favour of genetic modification, was broadcast on Channel 4 on 20 March 2000, also met with complaints. Environmentalist activists organised a campaign in an effort to discredit the film. A joint letter signed by a number of scientists from the Third World was issued in protest of Durkin's claims in this documentary. Mae-Wan Ho, a scientist featured on the programme, later said of her participation in the programme: "I feel completely betrayed and misled. They did not tell me it was going to be an attack on my position." However, although broadcasting regulator Ofcom received 17 complaints about the programme none was upheld; Ofcom concluded that 'although the programme set out to be a critical analysis of the case against GM, it nevertheless gave opportunity for a number of anti-GM speakers to explain their views clearly and fairly.'

=== The Great Global Warming Swindle ===
The Great Global Warming Swindle is a 2007 conspiracy theory documentary film. It premiered on Channel 4 in the United Kingdom on March 8, 2007. It was criticised heavily by atmospheric physicists, climate change scientists, and participants in the film.

Carl Wunsch who appeared on the programme has since repudiated the film, and described it "as close to propaganda as anything since World War II".

The film was praised by opponents of the scientific consensus on global warming, including Andrew Bolt, Dominic Lawson and Steven Milloy, and Durkin's work has been defended in an interview in Spiked.

It later emerged that Durkin had fallen out with geneticist Armand Leroi (with whom Durkin had previously refused to work), after Leroi questioned the accuracy of the data used in the film in an email to Durkin. Leroi copied the e-mail to various colleagues including Guardian journalist and Bad Science columnist Ben Goldacre and science writer and mathematics expert Simon Singh. Durkin replied to Leroi copying in the others with the single sentence: "You're a big daft cock." Singh then sent an email to Durkin that said: "I have not paid the same attention to your programme as Armand has done, but from what I did see it is an irresponsible piece of film-making. If you can send me a copy of the programme then I will examine it in more detail and give you a more considered response...it would be great if you could engage in the debate rather just resorting to one line replies."

Durkin responded by claiming that global warming had stopped, and concluded with, "Never mind a bit of irresponsible film-making. Go and fuck yourself." Durkin later apologised for his language, saying that he had sent the e-mails when tired and had just finished making the programme, and that he was "eager to have all the science properly debated with scientists qualified in the right areas."

An official judgement issued on 21 July 2008 by the British media regulator Ofcom found that the programme "did not fulfill obligations to be impartial and to reflect a range of views on controversial issues". It upheld complaints by Sir David King that his views had been misrepresented, and Carl Wunsch, on the points that he had been misled as to its intent, and that the impression had been given that he agreed with the programme's position on climate change. However, the regulator said that because "the link between human activity and global warming... became settled before March 2007" the audience was not "materially misled so as to cause harm or offence". Ofcom declined to rule on the accuracy of the programme, saying: "It is not within Ofcom's remit or ability in this case as the regulator of the 'communications industry' to establish or seek to adjudicate on 'facts' such as whether global warming is a man-made phenomenon". The movie has also been criticized for presenting only one Total Solar Irradiance (TSI) reconstruction, Hoyt and Schatten (1993), which has been unequivocally discredited due to flawed analysis. The apparent agreement between the HS93 TSI reconstruction and Earth's temperature record is now recognized as an artifact of flawed methodology. Consequently, the movie's claim that solar variability can explain the recent increase in global temperatures is invalid.

He has been described as "the scourge of the greens" and "one of the environmentalists' favourite hate figures".

=== Britain's Trillion Pound Horror Story ===
In 2010 Durkin made a programme called Britain's Trillion Pound Horror Story for Channel 4. Ostensibly about Britain's national debt, the film makes a case for lower taxes, a smaller public sector and a free-market economy. The film argues that Hong Kong's social and economic success is attributable to the positive non-interventionism implemented in 1961 by John James Cowperthwaite. In the film, Durkin argued that increasing public spending would stunt the economy instead of reviving it. The film featured Nigel Lawson, Geoffrey Howe, Brendan Barber and Alistair Darling.

=== Brexit: The Movie ===
In 2016 Durkin made a documentary film called Brexit: The Movie, about that year's referendum on EU membership, arguing for a vote to Leave. The film had a budget of £100,000, funded by crowdfunding.

=== Climate: The Movie (The Cold Truth) ===
In 2024, Martin Durkin wrote and directed a second conspiracy theory documentary film called Climate: The Movie (The Cold Truth). The film promotes climate change denial, by downplaying the extent of the problem and the dangers posed by the current rate of anthropogenic climate change, whilst promoting discredited theories (such as solar activity and cosmic rays being the cause of rising temperatures), promoting misinformation about the impacts of climate change on things such as the Great Barrier Reef and polar bears, and actively discouraging the adoption of climate change mitigation measures. Throughout the film Durkin pushes a conspiracy theory narrative and paranoid mindset that the media, political and scientific establishment is all left-wing. Durkin suggests that climate science is a conspiracy designed to exert control over ordinary people. The movie, like The Great Global Warming Swindle, has also been criticized for presenting only the Hoyt and Schatten (1993) TSI series, which has been unequivocally discredited due to flawed analysis. Its apparent agreement with Earth's temperature record is now understood to be an artifact of that flawed methodology and the whole claim of the movie that TSI can explain the temperature increase on Earth over the recent decades is invalid.

=== As executive producer ===
Martin Durkin has executive produced a wide range of programmes. Productions include: The Naked Pilgrim, an architectural travelogue that followed art critic Brian Sewell's pilgrimage to Santiago de Compostela; produced for UK's Channel Five it won the Sandford St. Martin Trust award for best programme in 2004; Face of Britain for Channel 4, a three-part series presented by Neil Oliver, which looked at the Wellcome Trust's DNA project profiling the ancestry of various British communities; How Do They Do It?, an engineering series for Discovery Channel; Secret Intersex, a two-part series about intersexuality for Channel 4, which was short listed for Best Science Programme in the 2004 Royal Television Society awards. He has served on the steering committees of the World Congress of Science Producers and the Edinburgh Television Festival and as a judge on the Bafta and Royal Television Society Awards.
