= Brian Sewell =

English art critic (1931–2015)

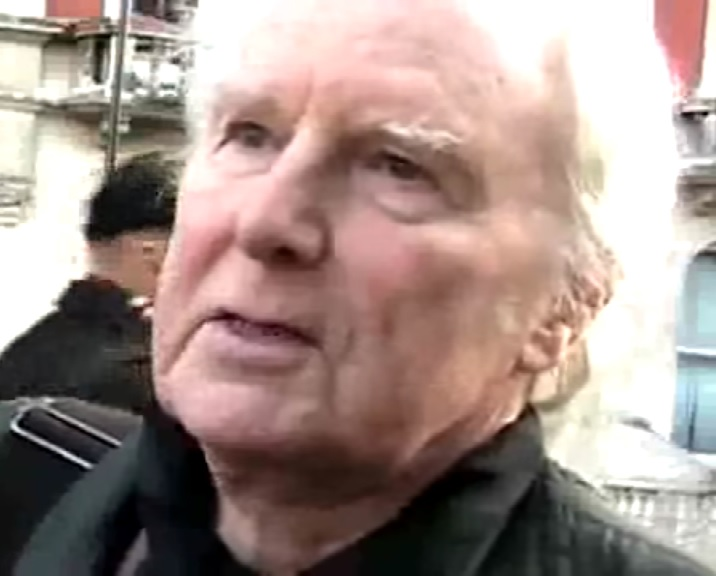
- Sewell in 2011
- Born: Brian Alfred Christopher Bushell Perkins; 15 July 1931; Hammersmith, London, England
- Died: 19 September 2015 (aged 84); London, England
- Education: Haberdashers' Aske's Boys' School; Courtauld Institute of Art, University of London
- Occupations: Art critic; journalist; art dealer
- Parent(s): Philip Heseltine (father); Mary Jessica Perkins (mother)
- Military career
- Rank: Second lieutenant
- Unit: Royal Army Service Corps

Brian Alfred Christopher Bushell Sewell (/ˈsjuːəl, sjuːl/; 15 July 1931 – 19 September 2015) was an English art critic. He wrote for the Evening Standard and had an acerbic view of conceptual art and the Turner Prize. The Guardian described him as "Britain's most famous and controversial art critic", while the Standard called him the "nation’s best art critic".

== Early life ==
Sewell was born on 15 July 1931, in Hammersmith, London, taking his mother's surname, Perkins. The man who in later life he claimed was his father, composer Philip Heseltine, better known as Peter Warlock, died of coal gas poisoning seven months before Sewell was born. Brian was brought up in Kensington, west London, and elsewhere by his mother, Mary Jessica Perkins, who married Robert Sewell in 1936.

He was educated at the private Haberdashers' Aske's Boys' School in Cricklewood. Offered a place to read history at Oxford, Sewell instead chose to enter the Courtauld Institute of Art, University of London, where his tutors included Anthony Blunt, who became his close friend.

Sewell graduated in 1957 and worked at Christie's auction house, specialising in Old Master paintings and drawings. After leaving Christie's he became an art dealer. He completed his National Service as a commissioned officer in the Royal Army Service Corps. He took LSD as a young man, describing it in 2007 as a drug "for people of my age. It's wonderful. The one thing you could not do, however, was drip it into your eyeballs. It sent you absolutely bonkers."

In 1979, after Blunt's exposure as the fourth man in the Cambridge spy ring, gaining much media attention, Sewell assisted in sheltering him in Chiswick.

== Art criticism ==
Following the Blunt affair, Sewell was hired as art critic for Tina Brown's revitalised Tatler magazine. In 1984, he replaced the avant-garde critic Richard Cork as art critic for the Evening Standard. He won press awards including Critic of the Year (1988), Arts Journalist of the Year (1994), the Hawthornden Prize for Art Criticism (1995) and the Foreign Press Award (Arts) in 2000. In April 2003, he was awarded the Orwell Prize for his Evening Standard column. In criticisms of the Tate Gallery's art, he coined the term "Serota tendency" after its director Nicholas Serota.

Although Sewell appeared on BBC Radio 4 in the early 1990s, it was not until the late 1990s that he became a household figure through his appearances on television. He was known for his formal, old-fashioned RP diction and for his anti-populist sentiments. He offended people in Gateshead by claiming an exhibition was too important to be held at the town's Baltic Centre for Contemporary Art and should instead be shown to "more sophisticated" audiences in London. He also disparaged Liverpool as a cultural city.

=== Controversy ===
In 1994, thirty-five figures from the art world signed a letter to the Evening Standard attacking Sewell for "homophobia", "misogyny", "demagogy", "hypocrisy", "artistic prejudice", "formulaic insults" and "predictable scurrility". Signatories included Karsten Schubert, Maureen Paley, Michael Craig-Martin, Christopher Frayling, John Hoyland, Sarah Kent, Nicholas Logsdail, George Melly, Sandy Nairne, Eduardo Paolozzi, Bridget Riley, Richard Shone, Marina Warner, Natalie Wheen and Rachel Whiteread.

Sewell responded with comments about many of the signatories, describing Paley as being "the curatrix of innumerable silly little Arts Council exhibitions" and describing Whiteread as being "mortified by my dismissal of her work for the Turner Prize". A letter supporting Sewell from twenty other art-world signatories accused the writers of attempted censorship to promote "a relentless programme of neo-conceptual art in all the main London venues". Sewell suggested that art world insiders had felt embarrassed by a recent TV stunt in which he, a dealer and another critic had been shown a painting without being told that it had been painted by an elephant. Sewell described the painting as having no merit, while the other participants praised it.

Sewell's attitude toward female artists was controversial. In July 2008, he was quoted in The Independent as saying:

The art market is not sexist. The likes of Bridget Riley and Louise Bourgeois are of the second and third rank. There has never been a first-rank woman artist. Only men are capable of aesthetic greatness. Women make up 50 per cent or more of classes at art school. Yet they fade away in their late 20s or 30s. Maybe it's something to do with bearing children.

Despite being attacked in his 2013 memoirs, Veronica Wadley, the editor of the Standard between 2002 and 2009, defended Sewell and said she had defended him from management, and arts lobbyists who wanted him sacked.

Sewell was strongly opinionated and was known to insult the general public for their views on art. With regard to public praise for the work of Banksy in Bristol, he was quoted as saying:

The public doesn't know good from bad. For this city to be guided by the opinion of people who don't know anything about art is lunacy. It doesn't matter if they [the public] like it.

He went on to assert that Banksy himself "should have been put down at birth". Media personality Clive Anderson described him as "a man intent on keeping his Christmas card list nice and short". In an Evening Standard review, Sewell summed up his view of the David Hockney: A Bigger Picture exhibition at the Royal Academy, as concluding that Hockney had made a mistake focusing on painting in his later career:

There was a time in the 1970s when I thought him one of the best draughtsmen of the 20th century, wonderfully skilful, observant, subtle, sympathetic, spare, every touch of pencil, pen or crayon essential to the evocation of the subject, whether it be a portrait or light flooding a sparse room; nothing has made me change that view, but Hockney has tried very hard...Hockney is not another Turner expressing, in high seriousness, his debt to the old master; Hockney is not another Picasso teasing Velázquez and Delacroix with not quite enough wit; here Hockney is a vulgar prankster, trivialising not only a painting that he is incapable of understanding and could never execute but in involving him in the various parodies, demeaning Picasso too.

Sewell was also known for his disdain for Damien Hirst, describing him as "fucking dreadful". In his review of Hirst's 2012 show at Tate Modern, Sewell said: "To own a Hirst is to tell the world that your bathroom taps are gilded and your Rolls-Royce is pink" adding, "Put bluntly, this man’s imagination is quite as dead as all the dead creatures here suspended in formaldehyde."

== Television ==
In 2003, Sewell made a pilgrimage to Santiago de Compostela in a documentary called The Naked Pilgrim, produced by Wag TV for Channel 5. Although he had not practised for decades, Sewell considered himself a Roman Catholic, prompting an emotional response to the faith of pilgrims at Lourdes. The series attracted large audiences and won the Sandford St Martin Trust award for Best Religious Programme. Following The Naked Pilgrim Sewell presented on two more series for Channel 5: Brian Sewell's Phantoms & Shadows: 100 Years of Rolls-Royce in 2004 and Brian Sewell's Grand Tour in 2006. Sewell also appeared as a guest film reviewer on Channel 5's Movie Lounge, where he frequently savaged films.

In Dirty Dalí: A Private View on Channel 4 on 3 June 2007, Sewell described his acquaintance with Salvador Dalí in the late 1960s, which included lying in the foetal position without trousers in the armpit of a figure of Christ and masturbating for Dalí, who pretended to take photos while fumbling in his trousers. Sewell appeared twice as panellist on the BBC's panel quiz programme Have I Got News for You and tried to teach cricketer Phil Tufnell about art (and learn about cricket) in ITV's Don't Call Me Stupid.

Sewell was the voice of Sir Kiftsgate in an episode of the children's cartoon The Big Knights. He also presented a programme on Voom HD Networks' Art Channel: Gallery HD called Brian Sewell's Grand Tour, in which he toured beautiful cities (primarily in Italy) visiting museums, towns, churches, historic sites, public squares, monuments and notable architectural spots whilst meeting local residents to discuss culture and art. Sewell reflected upon the 18th century, giving the perspective of what it would have been like as a Grand Tourist. Then he elaborated on what has become of these sites and those which have become lost over the course of history. In a 2009 BBC documentary about the UK's North-South divide, presented by ex-Deputy Prime Minister John Prescott, Sewell caused controversy by declaring that the solution to the divide was to send a pox or a plague upon the North so that the people there could all just die quietly.

Brian Badonde, one of the characters from the comedy show Facejacker, played by Kayvan Novak, was said by journalist Jimi Famurewa to be a parody of Sewell. His distinctive voice, described by one journalist as "posher than the queen", was popular with impersonators and added to his public image.

=== Television credits ===
Year	Programme	Role	Broadcaster
1996	The Works: Minette Walters and the Missing Masterpiece	Art historian	BBC
2003	The Naked Pilgrim (6 episodes)	Presenter	Channel 5
2004	Brian Sewell's Phantoms & Shadows: 100 Years of Rolls-Royce	Presenter	Channel 5
2006	Brian Sewell's Grand Tour (10 episodes)	Presenter	Channel 5
2006	Movie Lounge	Film critic	Channel 5
2006	Timeshift: The Da Vinci Code: The Greatest Story Ever Sold	Art critic	BBC
2007	Dirty Dalì: A Private View	Art critic	Channel 4

== Other activities ==
Sewell was a museum adviser in South Africa, Germany and the United States. He provided voice-overs for a variety of television commercials including for the Victoria and Albert Museum and feta cheese. Sewell was also an aficionado of classic cars, a fan of stock car racing and over several decades wrote extensively about cars, classic and contemporary, in the Evening Standard and elsewhere. In both his TV series, on the pilgrimage to Santiago and the Grand Tour, he drove his Mercedes-Benz 560 SEC coupé, that was previously owned by Formula One world champion Nigel Mansell. Sewell expressed a preference for driving his Mercedes barefoot.

== Personal life ==
External videos
- The roles of religion and politics in art, Brian Sewell interview, 3:40, 2nd of 31 parts, Web of Stories.

In a television programme broadcast on Channel 4 on 24 July 2007, marking the 40th anniversary of the passing of the Sexual Offences Act 1967 which partially decriminalised homosexuality in England and Wales, Sewell said, "I never came out... but I have slowly emerged". Sewell described himself as gay, saying he knew he probably was homosexual at the age of six. Later, Sewell would state that he was more comfortable with the term queer than gay to describe himself, and expressed opposition to same-sex marriage.

He had chastised himself for his attraction to men, describing it as an "affliction" and a "disability" and told readers, "no homosexual has ever chosen this sexual compulsion". In the first episode of The Naked Pilgrim, Sewell alluded to the loss of his virginity at the hands of a 60-year-old French woman "who knew what she was doing and was determined"; Sewell was 20 at the time. In his autobiography, Sewell indicates that he lost his virginity at the age of 15 to a fellow pupil at Haberdashers' Aske's School. He claimed to have slept with over 1,000 men.

In 2011 Sewell exposed the identity of his father, as revealed by his mother on her deathbed. He also revealed that his stepfather Robert Sewell and his mother, Mary Jessica (née Perkins), a publican's daughter from Camden, had admitted that Robert was not his father when he was 11, although he had already known it to be the case (they did not marry until 1936).

== Death and legacy ==
Sewell died of cancer on 19 September 2015 at the age of 84 at his home in London. The Sewell-Hohler Syndicate (named after Sewell and E.C. Hohler) was launched at Sewell's alma mater, the Courtauld Institute of Art, on 19 September 2016, one year after his death. The society served to promote, in the spirit of Sewell, interest in the arts and art criticism through conferences, interviews and debates. The Brian Sewell Archive is held at the Paul Mellon Centre for Studies in British Art in London. It contains papers collected and created by Sewell over the course of his life which includes personal items such as correspondence, photographs, passports, and programmes for cultural events, as well as material relating to his work as an art historian, critic, journalist, author, collector, dealer and media figure. The collection reflects Sewell's diverse interests and includes material on the arts, and also to the other loves of his life: dogs, cars and travel.

In September 2024, as part of its inaugural weekly edition, the London Standard used artificial intelligence to write a Sewell-inspired review of the National Gallery's Van Gogh: Poets and Lovers exhibition. The Standard's interim chief executive Paul Kanareck said that the use of artificial intelligence to imitate Sewell was "experimental" and had been approved by the critic's estate.

== Bibliography ==
Travel writing

- South from Ephesus: Travels Through Aegean Turkey (1989)

Non-fiction

- A Life with Food with Peter Langan (1990)

Art criticism

- The Reviews That Caused The Rumpus: And Other Pieces (1994)
- An Alphabet of Villains (1995) Revised edition of The Reviews That Caused The Rumpus
- Nothing Wasted: The Paintings of Richard Harrison with Richard Harrison (2010)
- Naked Emperors: Criticisms of English Contemporary Art (2012)

Autobiography

- Outsider: Always Almost: Never Quite (2011)
- Outsider II: Always Almost: Never Quite (2012)
- Sleeping with Dogs: A Peripheral Autobiography (2013)

Fiction

- The White Umbrella (2015)
