= The Boys from Baghdad High =

2007 British-American-French television documentary film

- Tribeca Film Festival poster
- Also known as: Baghdad High
- Genre: Documentary film Television news magazine
- Directed by: Ivan O'Mahoney; Laura Winter
- Starring: Hayder Khalid; Mohammad Raed; Anmar Refat; Ali Shadman (Ali Nadhaif)
- Composers: Will Worsley; Farhad Amirahmadi; Mounir Baziz
- Countries of origin: United Kingdom; United States; France
- Original languages: Arabic with subtitles English

Production
- Executive producers: Alan Hayling; Karen O'Connor; Hans Robert Eisenhauer; Sheila Nevins
- Producers: Ivan O'Mahoney; Laura Winter
- Production locations: Baghdad, Iraq
- Editors: Richard Guard; Johnny Burke
- Camera setup: single-camera
- Running time: 90 minutes

Original release
- Network: BBC Two
- Release: 8 January 2008

The Boys from Baghdad High, also known as Baghdad High, is a British-American-French television documentary film. It was first shown in the United Kingdom at the 2007 Sheffield Doc/Fest, before airing on BBC Two on 8 January 2008. It also aired in many other countries including France, Australia, the United States, Canada, Germany and the Netherlands. It documents the lives of four Iraqi schoolboys of different religious or ethnic backgrounds over the course of one year in the form of a video diary. The documentary was filmed by the boys themselves, who were given video cameras for the project.

Directed and produced by Ivan O'Mahoney and Laura Winter of Renegade Pictures and StoryLabTV, for the United Kingdom's BBC, HBO in the United States, and the Franco-German network Arte, The Boys from Baghdad High was produced by Alan Hayling and Karen O'Connor for the BBC, Hans Robert Eisenhauer for Arte, and Sheila Nevins for HBO.

The Boys from Baghdad High received high viewership when it initially aired in the UK, and was reviewed favourably in the media. It was named the Best News and Current Affairs Film at the European Independent Film Festival, won the Premier Prize at the Sandford St. Martin Trust Awards, and was nominated for awards at two film festivals. The documentary also received the Radio Times Readers Award, and a nomination for the Amnesty International 2008 Television Documentary and Docudrama UK Media Award.

== Synopsis ==
The film brings together the video diaries recorded by four friends and students at the Tariq bin Ziad High School for Boys in Zayouna, a mixed-race, middle-class area in the Karrada suburb of Baghdad, Iraq. Entering their final year in 2006, each has high expectations for the year ahead and hope to graduate so they can have a chance to attend university. At the same time, the boys must also deal with the increasing sectarian violence that is starting to extend into Karrada. They face the threats of roadside bombings, the hassles of security checkpoints on their way to school, frequent curfews, the constant presence of American Apache helicopters overhead, and the deterioration of their neighbourhood which becomes rife with assassinations, muggings and kidnappings. Many of their fellow students, unmotivated and academically underperforming, are absent from school.

Ali Shadman (Ali Nadhaif) is one of the few Kurdish people remaining in Baghdad. His family are struggling financially and resort to siphoning petrol from their car to run their back-up generator when the power grid fails. When the generator breaks down one night, Ali begins to wonder why he is fixing it against a backdrop of gunfire, instead of studying in peace. Another night, he reports the neighbourhood's news but explains there is nothing to speak of other than the usual explosions, violence, and death. Anmar Refat, a Syriac Christian, tries to remain philosophical and hopes that armed gangs will not attack the school. His family, however, are more nervous about any nearby gunfire, as their Christian beliefs increase the threat to their lives if anyone were to find out about them. Anmar has a girlfriend, whom he can contact only via his mobile phone, but he has not heard from her in several days, leaving him worried about whether she has found another boyfriend, or has been hurt in the violence. Hayder Khalid, a Shia Muslim, hopes to become a famous singer-songwriter. He frequently downloads music videos of English-language pop music so he can learn popular English songs and dance moves. Mohammad Raed, a Sunni Muslim, is the class clown at school, who prefers playing sports and fooling around with his friends to studying. Unaware of his behaviour at school, his mother believes he is hard-working, self-sufficient and mature, and believes he will graduate and go to university.

Halfway through the school year, Ali's family moves to the more peaceful Kurdish region in Northern Iraq but after living there for several months, Ali says that he is homesick and misses the action and noise of Baghdad. Mohammad, feeling lonely, "adopts" a bird with a broken wing and a mouse he finds in the house. This brings him some comfort, but his mother later demands that he get rid of the mouse as she does not want "vermin" in the house. Mohammad's family rejoice when Saddam Hussein is sentenced, and feel that his later execution was justified, as to do otherwise would have made the Iraqi people look weak. Conversely, Anmar's family is upset at his execution, as they feel that the people who came into power were no better than Hussein was. Hyder's mother says that many Iraqi people were hopeful about the arrival of American forces, and that it is wrong to blame America for all of the problems in Iraq. She notes that the bloodshed has yet to stop as the Sunni continues to kill the Shiite, and vice versa. As the film continues, Hyder's family loses its income and they start to sell their furniture to earn extra money.

At the end of the year, the boys must pass seven final exams to graduate. Anmar, Hyder and Ali each fail two subjects, and are given the option to retake the exams. Anmar passes the retakes and aspires to study English literature in college, and his family decide to move to the safer region of Arbul now that he has graduated. Hyder also retakes his exams and passes, but his family can no longer afford to pay for the university fees. Ali chooses not to retake the exams, and his family leave Iraq. Mohammad fails four subjects and must repeat his senior year. He chooses to do so at a different school while working at his uncle's scooter repair shop. As the documentary closes, it notes that during the year of filming, two of the boys' classmates were killed, six were kidnapped, and seventy-five left Iraq.

== Production ==
=== Concept ===
The Boys from Baghdad High was co-produced and co-directed by Ivan O'Mahoney and Laura Winter. Before working on the film, O'Mahoney had been a United Nations peacekeeper in Bosnia and an attorney in the Netherlands, and had directed the 2006 documentary How to Plan a Revolution, which profiled two young activists who attempted to remove the Azerbaijani government from power by staging an "Orange" revolution. He had also worked for the BBC, Channel 4, CNN, and PBS in Ethiopia, Iraq, Sudan and Colombia. Winter had previously worked for CNN, 60 Minutes, CBS Evening News, CBS Radio, The Christian Science Monitor and the New York Daily News in Afghanistan, Pakistan, Jordan and Iraq. The Boys from Baghdad High was the first time she was credited as a director.

O'Mahoney and Winter began working on the film in 2006. Winter had watched a film called The Women's Story, about two Iraqi women who had journeyed around the country and filmed what they saw. They wanted to make a documentary about "the people never seen on the evening news, [instead of] presidents, prime ministers, generals and militants ... claiming to know something of Iraq's future". Winter explained that "all these documentaries coming out of Iraq were done for or by adults. Iraqi children had not been more than a UN statistic about the dead, kidnapped or injured", so they decided to concentrate on what they viewed as the "real source of Iraq's future" – teenagers. "I wanted to tell the story of Iraq in a different way. As journalists, we do stories about kids and teenagers, but we don't hear from them. If you go to the UN reports, they are just a number and that's it." O'Mahoney was a little more reticent; he had recently worked in Iraq but did not wish to return due to the civil war and the deteriorating condition of the country. When it was decided to use a school as a backdrop to the story, which could also be used to provide a chronological narrative, O'Mahoney and Winter realised it would be too dangerous for the students to be seen with either a Western or Iraqi camera crew because it would draw too much attention to them, and so they decided that the students would film the documentary themselves.

=== Casting ===
Producers chose boys who were students of Tariq bin Ziad High School. The school was holding on to the notion of a united Iraq, even as the country was becoming increasingly racially and religiously segregated. Having worked in Iraq in 2003, Winter knew that the Baghdad district Karrada was mixed and integrated with high numbers of Shiites and Christians. She asked her former driver and translator, who had attended the school, if he would contact the principal. Initially the school was suspicious of their intentions, but decided to trust the judgement of Winter's translator. Principal Ra'ad Jawad selected eight boys to take part in the documentary because he knew they could be discreet about making the documentary, would not get bored, and would remain committed to filming their lives for a year. The producers wanted their cast to include girls, and had found a school and families willing to take part in the documentary, but the then-Minister of Education refused to let them take part. Jawad travelled to London to meet the producers and he was trained to operate the video cameras that the boys were to use. The cameras and tapes were sent into Iraq via the BBC News department, which were then passed onto the school. Jawad and two Iraqi associate producers trained the boys how to use the cameras. Two months into filming, four of the boys dropped out of the project, leaving Hayder Khalid, Anmar Refat, Ali Shadman, and Mohammad Raed. O'Mahoney and Winter never met the boys while the documentary was being produced because it was such a high-risk assignment.

=== Filming ===
The producers were diligent in ensuring the boys' security. O'Mahoney explained: "They were under very strict security rules when they were filming. They were told not to act as news cameramen. They were not allowed to film in the street. They could only film at school or at home, in secure environments." Winter added, "they are not paid news cameramen, and that was not the point of the film. Would they normally be running down the street toward a firefight to film it? No. Would they run toward a bombing, knowing that there could be a secondary explosion or a group of soldiers, who could start, at any second, firing wildly into the crowd, to film a piece of video? No. That's not real life for any Iraqi civilian." Nevertheless, Hayder sometimes filmed outside at night, and explained to the camera that he had to be careful because people are robbed if they are seen carrying even a mobile phone. On New Year's Eve, he and his friend celebrate with a bonfire in his friend's back yard, but after debating whether a noise they hear is fireworks or gunfire, Hayder rushes home. Another boy is driven to school one morning, and reach a special forces roadside checkpoint along the way. He explains, "if they see me with a camera they will take me to prison; they'll think I'm a terrorist who wants to bomb them."

=== Editing ===
More than 300 hours of footage was recorded by the students and the two Iraqi associate producers. It was transcribed, translated and edited into a 90-minute film. Getting the tapes out of Iraq proved difficult for Winter and O'Mahoney, who remained in the UK. They had to rely on journalists from many news agencies, especially those in the BBC News's Baghdad Bureau high-risk team, to smuggle the tapes out of Iraq. When curfews were enforced, weeks passed before the producers received new footage because it was impossible for anybody to leave their homes or the country.

The execution of Saddam Hussein, which Anwar had filmed from the internet from start to finish, was excluded from the documentary. "We had a big debate about whether or not that should go into the film", O'Connor explained. Water continued, "it was one of those things where to see it, it just gets you. But we had to ask ourselves, does it help our story? No." Footage that was nearly edited out included a scene where Anwar had to siphon petrol out of the family car for the house's generator. Anwar explained to the camera that he needed to do it because their family was so poor. "That's tough", commented Water, "because that's a dishonour to his family."

== Distribution ==
The Boys from Baghdad High received its world première at the 2007 Sheffield Doc/Fest, an annual film festival for documentary productions held in Sheffield, South Yorkshire. In the US it was screened on 29 April 2008 at the Tribeca Film Festival, and 1 August 2008 at the Traverse City Film Festival. The first time Winter and O'Mahoney met one of the film's subjects was at the 2008 Tribeca Film Festival, nearly a year after the filming had completed. Ali and his family had relocated to the US since completing the documentary, and so he was able to attend the screening. Winter and Ali met a second time at the Traverse City Film Festival. The producers had tried to get the boys visas to enter the UK for a screening in London, but they were denied entry by the British Government.

It premièred on television in the UK on BBC Two, a national terrestrial television network, on 8 January 2008 at 9:00 p.m. as part of the This World documentary series. Overnight viewing figures indicated that 600,000 households had watched the film, which was three percent of the total television audience for that time slot. It was broadcast in France and Germany on the joint-venture network Arte on 18 March 2008 at 9:00 p.m., with the French title Bagdad, le Bac Sous les Bombes, and Die Jungs von der Bagdad-High in Germany. It aired on the American cable network HBO as Baghdad High on 4 August 2008 at 9:00 p.m., and was available on HBO's video on demand service until 21 September 2008. The documentary also aired in Australia on the Special Broadcasting Service, Canada on CBC Newsworld, and in the Netherlands on VPRO.

The documentary was streamed online by the BBC using its BBC iPlayer service to UK residents for seven days after the initial broadcast. A Region 2 DVD of the documentary can be obtained, although it can only be purchased directly from the BBC and is not available in stores.

== Critical reception ==
Reviews for The Boys from Baghdad High were generally favourable. The Huffington Post said that giving the video cameras to the students was an excellent idea because the depiction of their school-life versus the increasing danger was captured "with neutral equality [so] that the film is able to capture the interiority of its subjects more acutely than a straight-forward examination of violence would". Thomas Sutcliffe of The Independent said, "its storyline was governed not by a tick-list of stock narrative dilemmas and secrets but the cruel uncertainties that occupation and insurgency have brought to Baghdad." Time Out New York gave the film five out of five stars, and PopMatters rated it 8 out of 10. The Washington Post's Paul Farhi said, "HBO has carved a niche as the TV home of some of the most compelling programs about the Iraq war ... Baghdad High does no harm to HBO's burgeoning war cred[ibility]." Variety, The Christian Science Monitor, LA Weekly, and the Los Angeles Times also praised the film. At the Question-and-Answer session following a screening at the Tribeca Film Festival, one audience member, a new recruit to the United States Marine Corps, told Ali, who had also attended, "I finally know what life is like behind those walls and what you guys are like, and it's been really, really fantastic."

There were complaints, however, that the documentary did not depict enough of the political aspects of the Iraqi War. Farhi said, "The 90-minute documentary doesn't say much about the larger issues facing Iraq, but it does capture some small and captivating human stories.... They happen to live in what one boy describes as 'the most dangerous city on Earth.' You don't see much of Iraq's violence in Baghdad High, but you surely feel its gravity and their dread." The Boston Herald's Mark Perigard said that he felt the documentary was "a personal story, not a political one". In The New York Times, Mike Hale commented, "While the boys talk frequently about violence and despair, they rarely discuss politics or ethnic differences (with the exception of Anmar, the Christian) and they almost never directly address the American presence. We do hear some parental opinions, which are surprisingly neutral. One mother says: 'We shouldn't blame the Americans for everything. There is something wrong with us too'." Jennifer Marin, a culture columnist from the Los Angeles Times, wrote at About.com, that while it was innovative, informative and a noble experiment, the footage is "undistinguished and rough because the hands holding the cameras weren't skilled and the eyes framing the shots were not those of artists or keen observers." She thought that, with the exception of Mohammad, the boys lacked charisma, and that the film failed to capture the drama of living in a war-zone, due to the lack of a director calling the shots. Perigard said, "After the time you've invested [as a viewer], it's not nearly satisfying enough. For all the questions this fascinating film raises, it might as well be written in sand."

"I think this film reflects on almost any place that is in the midst of a violent conflict. While militants are shooting at each other, blowing each other up and terrorizing the population to force their allegiance, people go on living. Kids try to go to school. Birthdays are celebrated. Teens hang out and dance to music. Exams are taken. All of these are normal things, all in the midst of incredible violence. Really this film is about the triumph of the collective human spirit."

— Laura Winter

Many reviewers noted the similarities between the Iraqi boys and those from Western cultures. Peter Scarlet, the artistic director at the Tribeca Film Festival, said, "What's fascinating about the film that resulted is how very familiar and ordinary these kids are – they're not really all that different from your own teenagers or the kids you went to school with. The kids of Baghdad High also open us up to a very different sense of life in Iraq than what we've been seeing on the nightly news for five years." The Huffington Post said, "previously it had been unfathomable that students in Baghdad might be experiencing the same ephemeral and narcissistic heartbreak as we are in the United States." Farhi and Nicholls noticed that the Iraqi students do the same things as American high school students, such as listening to rap music, trying to study without distractions, playing sports, becoming stressed over their final exams and acting silly with their friends. Perigard commented, "despite the cultural differences, Ali, Anmar, Hayder and Mohammad will seem instantly familiar to anyone who has spent time around a teenage boy. They like to wrestle each other, love Western music, dream big and have trouble buckling down in school."

The New York magazine said that the film's premise of four high-school friends videotaping their senior year "sounds like a fluffy reality show"; Bill Weber of Slant Magazine said, "putting the trials of MTV reality-show prima donnas in perspective, the middle-class quartet will be relatable to this BBC/HBO production's audience in their easy embrace of Western kid stuff ... Directors Ivan O'Mahoney and Laura Winter balance [portray] an everyday sense of the adolescents' wartime anxiety with the more commonplace juvenile relief." Similarly, The Huffington Post raised comparisons with MTV reality shows, but was pleased to see that the Iraqi boys did not play to the cameras because they had not been exposed to programmes such as Laguna Beach: The Real Orange County or The Paper. That juvenile relief was commented on by many; The Washington Post highlighted Mohammad's adoption of an unwelcome mouse in the house. Hale described a scene where Mohammad and Ali act like hostage and captor. "Suddenly Ali is holding a large knife. 'He's being naughty!' Mohammad says. Ali holds the knife near Mohammad and says, a little too unemotionally: 'Allah! This is the first hostage. I'm going to slaughter him this way.' Mohammad tells him to stop fooling around. Ali relents. 'O.K. He just got a presidential pardon. He can live'." Reuters also commented on this, and more banter between Ali and Mohammad. "Ali is shown making a pretend hostage video with Mohammad, and then teasing his friend for his smelly feet. 'If Chemical Ali really wanted to destroy the north he should have fired a rocket with Mohammad's socks in it'."

The depiction of the stark differences between Iraq and the Western world also received comments. Farhi described the school as having "all the charm of an abandoned prison", and continued with, "visiting a friend who lives a few hundred yards away involves running a potential gauntlet of kidnappers and snipers; getting to school on time means navigating military checkpoints. Before a big exam, teachers frisk their students for explosives," while Perigard said, "at night, their neighbourhoods are riddled with gunfire and explosions". In the New York Daily News, Patrick Huguenin wrote, "American teens wouldn't recognize other scenes showing how life slips into a heavily regulated series of checkpoints and curfews." Hale said, "The way the boys can tell without looking whether it's an Apache or a Chinook helicopter overhead, the way the curtains are always drawn, the level of physical contact and affection among the men ... would be alien to American sensibilities."

== Accolades ==
The Boys from Baghdad High was well-received from its initial screening. It was nominated for a Youth Jury Award at the 2007 Sheffield Doc/Fest, shortlisted for an Amnesty International 2008 UK Media Award in the category for Television Documentary and Docudramas, and the European Independent Film Festival named it the Best News and Current Affairs film. It was nominated for the Readers' Award in the Radio Times, and in May 2008 it won the Premiere Prize at the Sandford St. Martin Trust Awards, which acknowledges excellence in religious broadcasting. The Trust's chairman and former BBC Head of Religious Broadcasting Colin Morris said of the documentary, "We saw the way faith breaks into secular life in the chaos of present-day Iraq. Coming from different ethnic and religious backgrounds the boys showed that despite the war their daily preoccupations were much the same as those of teenage boys the world over – girlfriends, parents, sport, fashion, exams, music. Would their friendship survive? Ultimately the programme confronted British viewers with the question: 'What in God's name are we doing there?'" The film received a standing ovation from the audience at the Traverse City Film Festival, and at the Tribeca Film Festival it was short-listed for the 2008 World Documentary Feature Competition, competing against eleven other non-fiction films for Best Documentary Film and Best New Documentary Filmmaker.
