= Breunion Boys =

Dutch boy band

The Breunion Boys are a Dutch boy band who released their first single, "Britain Come Back", in December 2018, with the goal of convincing the people of the United Kingdom not to leave the European Union. The music video for the single was produced by July Film and directed by Dutch director Thessa Meijer. The group was formed by Julia Veldman, a Dutch visual storyteller, who mentioned Take That as an influence in creating the band. Their second single, released in January 2019, called "The Real Deal", is about the deal made by Prime Minister Theresa May with the EU. Both singles are composed and written by Flavia Faas.

The band consists of five members: Joshua Alagbe, Hajo Reurs, Seyed Hosseini, Pablo Ramos and Gilles Meester. They received international media attention, with interviews on Good Morning Britain and Sky News and mentions on The Russell Howard Hour and Last Week Tonight with John Oliver.

== See also ==
- Brexit in popular culture
