= BorderIrish =

Pseudonymous satirical author

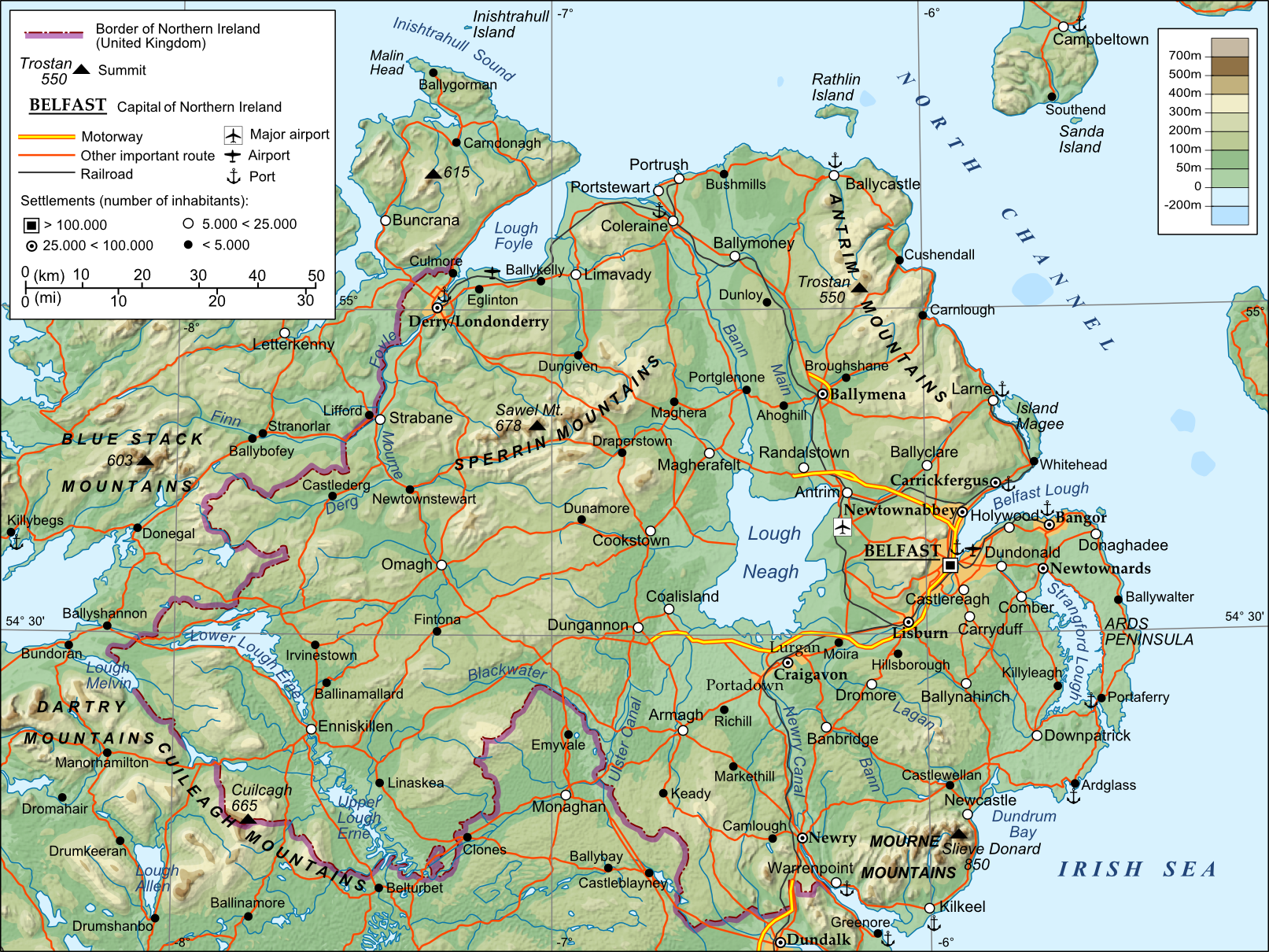
- Map of Northern Ireland and the border
- Writing career
- Years active: 2018–2020
- Genre: Satire
- Subject: Irish border
- Notable works: I Am the Border, So I Am (2019)
- Website: twitter.com/BorderIrish

BorderIrish or @BorderIrish was the pseudonym of an initially anonymous satirical author who from 2018 to 2020 wrote in the first person about being the 97-year-old 499 km (310 mi) Irish border between the Republic of Ireland and Northern Ireland, and in particular about the implications of Brexit. The author was active both on Twitter and in print, publishing the book I Am the Border, So I Am (2019). The account retired on 31 January 2020, as the United Kingdom left the European Union.

Colin Graham, professor of English at Maynooth University, has since made it known that he was behind the pseudonym.

== Authorship ==
The author first began posting satirical tweets as the Irish border (i.e. an anthropomorphism) in February 2018, tweeting "I'm seamless and frictionless already, thanks. Bit scared of physical infrastructure. Don't like the sea". In a December 2018 interview with Austrian newspaper Wiener Zeitung, BorderIrish said (as the border): "I had retired and spent the past 20 years watching the sheep and the clouds. Everyone had forgotten me, but then Brexit came and suddenly journalists were looking for me and politicians were talking nonsense about me, so I decided to make me heard".

In a December 2018 interview with BBC News (both as the author, and as the border), the author identified as male, and said he had lived on both sides of the border. The author has been interviewed as his pseudonym, both by Irish and British media and by media from the European continent; and his satirical tweets as the Irish border have been discussed in wider media coverage on Brexit. He did not clarify any other facts regarding his identity, and spoke through his agents.

In January 2019, the Twitter account of Irish taoiseach Leo Varadkar was noted as a follower of @BorderIrish; other notable followers of @BorderIrish include Robert Peston and Alastair Campbell.

On 31 January 2020, as the United Kingdom left the European Union, BorderIrish announced that he was retiring his Twitter account telling The Irish Times: "It feels like I won the battle and lost the war"; and signing off his Twitter account with "I was the Border, so I was".

It has since become known that Colin Graham, professor of English at Maynooth University, was behind the BorderIrish pseudonym. He spoke about his BorderIrish identity in an RTÉ Radio 1 interview in 2023.

== Works ==
In October 2019, BorderIrish released a book titled I Am the Border, So I Am, which was favourably reviewed, and described by Fintan O'Toole as "among the best satires of the Brexit era", and listed by Alex Clark in the Financial Times "Best audiobooks of 2019".

== Bibliography ==
- BorderIrish (31 October 2019). I Am the Border, So I Am. HarperCollins. ISBN 978-0-00-835699-6.

== See also ==
- Brexit and the Irish border
- Brexit in popular culture
- Twitterature
- Led By Donkeys
