= Movie Lounge =

British television series

Movie Lounge is a movie and DVD review television show, presented by newspaper columnist and food critic Giles Coren, broadcast in 2006. It was shown on the British terrestrial channel Five.

Movie Lounge was produced by Monkey Kingdom.

== Celebrity guests ==
Movie Lounge had a number of famous guests during its airing on Channel Five. These include:

- Sue Perkins
- Gail Porter
- Nicholas Hoult
- Emma Kennedy
- Kenny Baker

== Regular features ==
Regular features included:

- A film being critiqued by art critic Brian Sewell, who, more often than not, savages said film.
- A film being critiqued by "The Sleazy Kid", a lecherous 15-year-old boy who seems to be only interested in light nudity in a film.
