= The Naked Pilgrim =

Documentary series on the Catholic pilgrimage to Santiago de Compostela

- Genre: Documentary
- Directed by: Steven Green
- Presented by: Brian Sewell
- Theme music composer: Srdjan Kurpjel
- Country of origin: United Kingdom
- Original language: English
- No. of episodes: 6

Production
- Executive producer: Martin Durkin

Original release
- Network: Five
- Release: 1 July 2003

The Naked Pilgrim is documentary series produced by British broadcaster Five and presented by art critic Brian Sewell. First broadcast in 2003, the series follows Sewell on the Catholic pilgrimage to Santiago de Compostela.

The series, ostensibly an arts travelogue about the pilgrimage route, was notable for Sewell wrestling with his own loss of faith and for his emotional responses to the pilgrims he encountered. Each episode features a leg of the pilgrimage route with a diversion in the third episode to visit the shrine at Lourdes.

The series was a success for Five and was watched by more than one million people - the channel's biggest audience for an arts programme.

The series won the prestigious Sandford St. Martin Trust award for Best Religious Programme. It was released on DVD in 2004.

In the show, Sewell drives on the pilgrimage a bronze 1988 Mercedes-Benz C126 560SEC coupe (registration E132 NWP), that previously belonged to 1992 Formula One World Champion Nigel Mansell.

== Locations ==
Episode 1

- Paris - Sainte Chapelle, Sacré-Cœur, Montmartre, Notre Dame de Paris

Episode 2

- Chartres, Pons, Orléans

Episode 3

- Bordeaux, Poitiers, Lourdes

Episode 4

- Roncesvalles, Bermeo, Guernica, Bilbao

Episode 5

- Burgos, Fromista, León

Episode 6

- Santiago de Compostela
