= Postcards from the 48% =

2018 documentary film produced by David Wilkinson

- Directed by: David Wilkinson
- Produced by: David Wilkinson
- Release dates: 23 June 2018 (Edinburgh International Film Festival); 6 July 2018
- Country: United Kingdom
- Language: English

Postcards from the 48% is a 2018 documentary film produced by David Wilkinson. It was made by, and features, members of the 48% of the UK electorate who voted Remain in the 2016 British EU Referendum.

== Production ==
Wilkinson was interviewed by The Guardian during production. He stated that he was making a documentary for cinematic release rather than TV broadcast because "I would be forced to put the leavers’ side as well. That's not what the film is about. It's about solely championing [remainers]."

== Reception ==
A reviewer for The Times wrote that it "gives voice to the fears and the hopes of the nation's discontented remainers". A reviewer for The Guardian wrote that "Wilkinson gathers and binds a pretty much unarguable case for persisting in trying to overturn Brexit."

== Release ==
Postcards from the 48% had a test screening in the EU Parliament in Brussels on 10 April 2018 and opened on 23 June 2018 at the Edinburgh International Film Festival. The film went on general release in the UK on 6 July 2018. It was released on DVD on 1 October 2018.
