= European Court =

European Court may refer to:

- Court of Justice of the European Union, the judiciary of the European Union, based in Luxembourg
  - European Court of Justice (ECJ), the EU's highest court, established in 1952
  - General Court (European Union), established in 1989
  - European Union Civil Service Tribunal, established in 2005
- European Court of Auditors, an institution of the European Union, established in 1977
- European Court of Human Rights, an institution based in Strasbourg for the hearing of human rights complaints from Council of Europe member states; unrelated to the European Union; established in 1959
- Royal courts in Europe

== See also ==
- Relationship between the European Court of Justice and European Court of Human Rights
