= Brexit: The Movie =

2016 British documentary film by Martin Durkin

- Directed by: Martin Durkin
- Written by: Martin Durkin
- Production company: Wag TV
- Release date: 11 May 2016
- Running time: 81 minutes
- Country: United Kingdom
- Language: English
- Budget: £300,000

Brexit: The Movie is a 2016 British film written and directed by Martin Durkin, advocating for the withdrawal of the United Kingdom from the European Union, commonly called Brexit (a portmanteau of British and exit). The film's production was funded through crowdfunding via Kickstarter.

It premiered in London on 11 May 2016, before being released the following day on YouTube and Vimeo.

== Production ==
Brexit: The Movie was written and directed by Martin Durkin to advocate for the withdrawal of the United Kingdom from the European Union (Brexit) prior to the United Kingdom European Union membership referendum in June 2016. The film was crowdfunded through Kickstarter, with its £100,000 goal having been met with contributions from 1,500 donors by 26 February 2016.

According to the film's official website, by the end of production, a total of over £300,000 had been raised by over 1,800 contributors. One of the producers of the film David Shipley was convicted of fraud by false representation and received a jail sentence of three years and nine months in February 2020. The fraud occurred in 2014 when he was attempting to find funding for his corporate finance advisory firm Spitfire Capital. The firm provided £50,000 towards the production of the film.

The film featured many leading advocates of leaving the European Union, including:

- 5th Viscount Ridley, journalist and businessman
- Daniel Hannan, then Member of the European Parliament
- Claire Fox, former co-publisher of Living Marxism magazine
- Baron Lawson of Blaby, former Chancellor of the Exchequer
- Baron Howard of Lympne, former leader of the Conservative Party
- Kate Hoey, then Member of Parliament
- Peter Lilley, then Member of Parliament
- James Delingpole, Spectator columnist
- Janet Daley, Daily Telegraph columnist
- Simon Heffer, Daily Telegraph columnist
- James Bartholomew, Daily Telegraph columnist
- Mark Littlewood, then director for the Institute of Economic Affairs
- Eamonn Butler, then director of the Adam Smith Institute
- Kelvin MacKenzie, former editor of the Sun newspaper
- Ruth Lea, former Director of the Centre for Policy Studies
- John Mills, founder of consumer products company JML

== Synopsis ==
The film argued it was in the interest for the United Kingdom to leave the European Union, due to lack of accountability of its institutions and that Britain should follow the Swiss economic model and strike new trade deals with the rest of the world.

The film explains that the United Kingdom will not require a trade deal with the European Union after leaving, but it will likely get one because "the Union is desperate to keep it goods flowing into the UK". Meanwhile, the percentage of trade from the UK into the rest of the European Union is declining. Daniel Hannan states that it is "falling virtually by the minute, I mean its tumbling while we are doing this interview". Ruth Lea states: "They need us more than we need them." David Davies MP comments that Britain has a long established history of trading since the days of Sir Francis Drake and believes that once out of the European Union, the UK will be able strike further trade deals.

Matt Ridley believes by leaving the European Union, the UK "we could have prosperity on a level that we can't even imagine now". The film narrator states that by "escaping fortress Europe could be a new start for Britain; a return at last to the global commercial and trading giant we were in the 19th Century. If we embrace free trade and escape the stultifying restrictions of EU over-regulation, there’s the potential for an extraordinary economic renaissance."

== Distribution ==
The film was made available for free online streaming on YouTube and Vimeo on 12 May 2016, the day after its release and premiere at the Odeon Leicester Square in London. The film's premiere was organised by Brexit campaign Leave.EU with sponsorship from the aircraft manufacturer, Britten-Norman.

Those who attended the premiere included Mike Read, Nigel Lawson, Ben Volpeliere-Pierrot, Nigel Evans, Kate Hoey, John Redwood, Nigel Farage, Ben Duncan, Peter Whittle, Daniel Hannan, Harry Cole, Lizzie Cundy and David Davis.

During the showing of the film, a member of the audience shouted "Nonce!" when footage was shown of Edward Heath signing Britain into the European Economic Community. Further boos and hisses were aimed at Tony Blair and David Cameron when they were shown on the screen.

It was also broken into a twenty six part series published as a YouTube playlist, embedded on the film's official website.

== Reception ==
Brexit: The Movie received over 1.5 million views on YouTube by 23 June 2016 (the date of the referendum). The film received mixed reviews from critics. Paul Baldwin, writing for The Daily Express, called it a "powerful" exposure of the lack of accountability within the European Union. Nicholas Dunn-McAfee of the Public Relations and Communications Association commented that the film was "easily digestible" and "witty" but felt that it was a "little too late and a little too stretched".

Newsweek's reviewer noted the film's attempt to market to conservative, anti-establishment audiences, calling it "a libertarian's wet dream of Randian proportions" but criticised alleged inconsistencies in the film. The Huffington Post reviewer felt that relied on ethnic stereotypes and omitted certain perspectives. However also praised the film's persuasiveness, but indicated that it could potentially drive voters to support the UK remaining within the EU. German newspaper Frankfurter Allgemeine Zeitung, criticised the lack of balance in the film, as it did not feature a single pro-European Union viewpoint.

There was further criticism of the film's use of national stereotypes. Owen Bennett said that the Italians were "portrayed as shoddy with workers more concerned with snogging a curvaceous woman than making quality brollies", while the French "was, yep you guessed it, wearing a beret, a striped top and had a string of onions round his neck".

Vice reviewer Sam Kriss also criticised the national stereotypes : "A French farmer is reading Le Monde with a string of garlic around his neck. A ramshackle European umbrella factory is represented by two skinny men in white vests and suspenders who spend their time pawing at a woman in a red dress; their Chinese competitors have straight backs, expressionless faces, and are very good at sums". Reviewers from The Tab who attended the premier, Joseph Archer & Claire Anderson at this point "sat uneasy in our seats as the film rolled on".

Sam Kriss argued that while the film had strong arguments against the European Union, he believed "why the upper classes are so excited for Brexit. They see an undemocratic and unaccountable EU elite ruling by diktat and an unfounded sense of their own superiority, and they think: hey, that's our job".

== See also ==
- The European Union: In or Out
- Brexit: The Uncivil War
- Euromyth
