= Sandford St Martin Trust =

Religious charity based in the United Kingdom

The Sandford St Martin Trust is a United Kingdom-based religious charity. It was established in 1978 to promote excellence in religious broadcasting. Each year the Trust holds an awards ceremony for outstanding achievement in religious broadcasting. The awards ceremony is held at Lambeth Palace where prize money of approximately £10,000 is awarded to winners. Categories have included radio, TV, and a Local and Community Award (made in 2014). In 2015 the Sandford St Martin Trust Awards introduced a new children's category for content aimed at under-18s.

The Sandford St Martin Trust also administer a joint "Readers' Award" with the Radio Times for a programme chosen by readers of that magazine.

The Trust is administered by up to twelve trustees. The current chair is the Rt Rev'd Jan McFarlane, Bishop of Repton. Trustees include the broadcasters Roger Bolton and Torin Douglas MBE.

== Special awards ==
=== 2015 ===
Children's Broadcasting Award: Children of the Holocaust, Fettle Animation for BBC Two

Children's Broadcasting Runner-up: Children of Kabul- An Uncertain Future, A CBBC Newsround Special

Trustees’ Award: Lyse Doucet, Broadcast Journalist

=== 2014 ===
Local, Community and Online Award: Sounds Jewish: The Jewish Revival in Poland, JW3: Jewish Community Center for London for Guardian.com website

Personal Award: Melvyn Bragg, Broadcaster

Trustees Award: Sir John Tavener, Composer

=== 2013 ===
Trustees’ Award: Olympic Opening Ceremony 2012, Director: Danny Boyle, Writer: Frank Cottrell Boyce for BBC One

Personal Award: Jonathan Sacks, Former Chief Rabbi

== Television Awards ==
=== 2025 ===
- Winner: YOUNG, BRITISH AND ANTI-ABORTION, Firecrest Films for BBC One
- Runner-up: DEFIANCE – FIGHTING THE FAR RIGHT, Rogan Productions, GroupM Motion
- Radio Times Readers' Award: RAMADAN – A JOURNEY ACROSS BRITATIN, ITV News for ITV

=== 2024 ===
- Winner: A TIME TO DIE, True Vision for ITV
- Runner-up: WITNESS – A CHILD OF GAZA, Alef Multimedia for Al Jazeera English
- Radio Times Readers' Award: THE HOLYLAND AND US – OUR UNTOLD STORIES, Wall to Wall Media for BBC Two

=== 2023 ===
- Winner: CHILDREN OF UKRAINE, Renegade Pictures for ITV1
- Runner-up: EXPOSED: DAVID BADDIEL: JEWS DON’T COUNT, Mindhouse Productions for Channel 4
- Radio Times Readers' Award: ‘GOOD GRIEF WITH REV RICHARD COLES, Bowled Over Media Ltd for Channel 4

=== 2022 ===
- Winner: BROTHERHOOD: THE INNER LIFE OF MONKS, Intrepid Media Ltd for BBC Four
- Runner-up: HELP, The Forge for Channel 4
- Radio Times Readers' Award: ‘TIME’ BY JIMMY McGOVERN, BBC Studios for BBC One

=== 2021 ===
- Winner: Ashes to Ashes, Rees Films for ‘Witness’, Al Jazeera English
- Runner-up: Exposed: The Church’s Darkest Secrets, Top Hat Productions for BBC Two
- Radio Times Readers' Award: It’s A Sin, Red Production Company for Channel 4 and HBO

=== 2020 ===
- Winner: For Sama, Channel 4 News and ITN Productions for Channel 4 and Frontline PBS
- Runner-up: The Last Survivors, Minnow Films for BBC Two
- Radio Times Readers' Award: Good Omens, BBC Studios, Blank Corporation, Narrative and Amazon Studios for Amazon

=== 2019 ===
- Winner: My Dad, The Peace Deal and Me, Dragon Film & Television for BBC One
- Runner-up: Louis Theroux’s Altered States: Choosing Death, BBC Studios: The Documentary Unit for BBC Two
- Radio Times Readers' Award: A Vicar’s Life, BBC Studios, Pacific Quay Productions for BBC Two

=== 2018 ===
- TV and Radio Times Readers’ Award: Broken, LA Productions Ltd for BBC One
- Runner-up: ISIS: The Origins of Violence, Blakeway Productions for Channel 4

=== 2017 ===
- TV and Radio Times Readers’ Award: A World Without Down’s Syndrome?, Dragonfly Film and Television for BBC 2
- Runner-up: Life and Death the Pentecostal Way, BBC Studios Pacific Quay Productions for BBC 2

=== 2016 ===
- Winner: My Son the Jihadi, True Vision Productions for Channel 4
- Runner-up: Baz the Lost Muslim, Brown Bread Films for RTÉ2
- Radio Times Readers' Award: Call the Midwife, Neal Street Productions for BBC One

=== 2015 ===
- Winner: One Million Dubliners, Underground Films for RTÉ One
- Runner-up: Marvellous, Fifty Fathoms and Tiger Aspect Productions for BBC Two

=== 2014 ===
- Winner: The Story of the Jews, Oxford Film and TV for BBC Two, Presenter: Simon Schama
- Runner-up: A Very British Ramadan, Watershed Productions for Channel 4
- Runner-up: Hillsborough – Never Forgotten, BBC Religion and Ethics for BBC Two

=== 2013 ===
- Premier Award: David Suchet: In the Footsteps of St Paul - CTVC/Jerusalem Productions for BBC One, Presenter: David Suchet
- Runner-Up: Goodbye to Canterbury - BBC Factual Arts for BBC Two, Presenter: Rowan Williams, former Archbishop of Canterbury
- Merit Award: Islam: The Untold Story - Maya Vision International for Channel 4
- Radio Times Readers' Award: David Suchet: In the Footsteps of St Paul - CTVC/Jerusalem Productions for BBC One

=== 2012 ===
- Premier Award: Life of Muhammad - Crescent Films / Rageh Omaar for BBC Two, Presenter: Rageh Omaar
- Runner-Up: The King James Bible: The Book that Changed the World - BBC Religion & Ethics for BBC Two, Presenter: Melvyn Bragg
- Merit Award: Ian Hislop: When Bankers Were Good - Wingspan Productions for BBC Two, Presenter: Ian Hislop
- Merit Award: Wonderland: A Hasidic Guide to Love, Marriage and Finding a Bride - BBC Factual for BBC Two
- Radio Times Readers' Award: Songs of Praise 50th Anniversary - BBC One / BBC Religion & Ethics

=== 2011 ===
- Premier Award: The Nativity - Red Planet Pictures / BBC Wales for BBC One
- Runner-up: Our World: God’s Beggar Children - BBC News Channel / BBC World News
- Merit Award: Benedict: Trials of a Pope - BBC Religion & Ethics for BBC Two
- Merit Award: Rev - Big Talk Productions for BBC Two
- Radio Times Readers' Award: The Nativity - Red Planet Pictures / BBC Wales for BBC One

=== 2010 ===
- Premier Award: The Bible: A History, Episode 1: Creation - Pioneer Productions for Channel 4, Presenter: Howard Jacobson
- Runner-Up: A History of Christianity, Episode 1 - BBC Religion & Ethics for BBC Four, Presenter: Prof Diarmaid MacCulloch
- Merit: 1984: A Sikh Story - BBC Religion & Ethics for BBC One, Presenter: Sonia Deol
- Merit: Did Darwin Kill God? - BBC Religion & Ethics for BBC Two, Presenter: Conor Cunningham
- Radio Times Readers' Award: A History of Christianity, Episode 1 - BBC Religion & Ethics for BBC Four, Presenter: Prof Diarmaid MacCulloch

=== 2009 ===
- Premier Award: Miracle on the Estate - BBC Religion & Ethics for BBC One
- Runner-up: The Passion, Episode 3 - BBC Drama / Deep Indigo / HBO for BBC One
- Runner-up: The Qu’ran - Juniper / Antony Thomas for Channel Four
- Merit Award: Dispatches: Saving Africa’s Witch Children - Red Rebel / Oxford Scientific Films for Channel Four

=== 2008 ===
- Premier Award: The Boys from Baghdad High

=== 2007 ===
- Premier Award: Greater Love Hath No Man – BBC Religion and Ethics for BBC1
- Runner-up: Art & Soul – BBC Scotland and TV Factual Aberdeen for BBC2 Scotland
- Merit Award: The Convent – BBC Religion and Ethics for BBC1
- Merit Award: Every Parent’s Nightmare – BBC Religion and Ethics for BBC1

=== 2006 ===
- Premier Award: 7/7: A Test of Faith – Granada Factual North for ITV1
- Runner-up: Priest Idol – Diverse (Bristol) in association with Jerusalem Productions for Channel 4
- Merit Award: Tsunami: Where Was God? – 3BM for Channel 4
- Merit Award: The Monastery – Tiger Aspect in association with Jerusalem Productions for BBC2

=== 2005 ===
- Premier Award: Victim 0001 – CTVC for ITV1
- Runner-Up: Children of Abraham – 3BM Television for Channel 4
- Merit Award: Karbala – City of Martyrs – ITN for Channel 4
- Merit Award: Jointly awarded to Jesus Who? – BBC Religion and Ethics for BBC1 and The Battle for Britain’s Soul – BBC Religion and Ethics for BBC2

=== 2004 ===
- Premier Award: The Naked Pilgrim – Wag TV for Five
- Runner-up: Some of My Best Friends Are… – Lion Television for Channel 4
- Merit Award: Songs of Praise – BBC1

== Radio Awards ==
=== 2025 ===
- Winner: STAGGERING IN THE DARK, Falling Tree Productions for BBC Radio 3
- Runner-up: THE QUILT – THE FAITH, Aunt Nell

=== 2024 ===
- Winner: THE INDESTRUCTIBILITY OF HOPE – WARTIME CHRISTMAS IN UKRAINE, Sunday Worship, BBC Religion and Ethics for BBC Radio 4
- Runner-up: THE RIGHT THING: FOLLOW GOD, NOT THE PEOPLE, CTVC for BBC World Service

=== 2023 ===
- Winner: FAITH, SEX AND ME, Loftus Media for Hits Radio Pride
- Runner-up: THE CHURCH OF SOCIAL JUSTICE, BBC Radio 4

=== 2022 ===
- Winner: A UYGHUR RAMADAN, CTVC for’Things Unseen’ podcast
- Runner-up: THINGS FELL APART, BBC Audio for BBC Radio 4/BBC Sounds

=== 2021 ===
- Winner: The Paddle Out, Falling Tree Productions for BBC World Service
- Runner-up: The Deadly Saris, Documentary on One for RTÉ Radio 1
- Runner-up: The Punch, Just Radio Ltd for BBC Radio 4

=== 2020 ===
- Winner: The Wind Phone, Falling Tree Productions for Heart & Soul, BBC World Service
- Runner-up: This Is My Story: Allen Langham, United Christian Broadcasters for UCB Player App/Podcast Platforms

=== 2019 ===
- Winner: Doorstep Daughter, BBC Radio Current Affairs for BBC Radio 4
- Runner-up: The Silence of the Lamb (Lent Talk), BBC Religion for BBC Radio 4

=== 2018 ===
- Winner: 5 Live with Emma Barnett: Stanbrook Abbey, 5 live Daily production team for BBC Radio 5 live
- Runner-up: Hardeep’s Sunday Lunch: Inverness, BBC Radio Religion and Ethics for BBC Radio 4

=== 2017 ===
- Winner: All Thing Considered: Aberfan 50 Year Anniversary, Religious Programmes Department for the BBC Radio Wales
- Runner-up: Canada’s Atheist Minister, BBC Radio Productions North for BBC World Service

=== 2016 ===
- Winner: Objections at the Wedding (Heart and Soul), Whistledown Productions for the BBC World Service
- Runner-up: Not Now, BBC Radio Scotland for Radio 4

=== 2015 ===
- Winner: No Destination, Reel Soul Movies for BBC Radio 4
- Runner-up: For the Love of God, BBC Asian Network

=== 2014 ===
- Winner: I Have a Dream, BBC Scotland Features for BBC Radio 4
- Runner-up: Married For a Minute, BBC Asian Network

=== 2013 ===
- Premier Award: Hearing Ragas, BBC Radio 4
- Runner-up: Blasphemy & the Governor of the Punjab, BBC Radio 4
- Merit: The Pulse Passion, Whistling Frog Productions, HCJB Global for the Pulse

=== 2012 ===
- Premier Award: Resurrection Stories, BBC Radio Scotland
- Runner-up: Faith and 9/11, TBI Media for BBC Radio 2
- Merit: Something Understood: Abraham, Unique Productions for BBC Radio 4
- Merit: Good Friday Reflection, Central FM

=== 2011 ===
- Premier Award: King James Bible: Readings, BBC Religion & Ethics for BBC Radio 4
- Runner-up: The Pope’s British Divisions, BBC Radio Current Affairs for BBC Radio 4
- Merit: Good Friday Special, Prison Radio Association for National Prison Radio
- Merit: Jesus Meek and Mild, The Pulse, West Yorkshire
- Merit: All Things Considered: Sarah Joseph, BBC Radio Wales

=== 2010 ===
- Premier Award: Twin Sisters: Two Faiths, Ladbroke Productions for BBC Radio 4
- Runner-up: The Understanding, BBC Radio Drama for BBC Radio 4
- Merit: All Things Considered: Treasures out of Darkness, BBC Radio Wales
- Merit: Dear God, BBC Coventry & Warwickshire
- Merit: Something Understood: Hospitality, Loftus Audio for BBC Radio 4

=== 2009 ===
- Premier Award: Witness (Episode 4): Tested, BBC Religion & Ethics/BBC Drama for BBC Radio 4
- Runner-Up: Christmas Awakening, BBC Scotland
- Merit: Let us Pod: Bereavement, Clifton Diocese Website and BCfm Community Radio for Bristol
- Merit: Heart and Soul: Fatwas, BBC World Service

=== 2007 ===
- Premier Award: God and the Gun – BBC Religion for BBC Radio 4
- Runner-up: Life Beyond Death – BBC World Service
- Merit Award: Humphrys in Search of God – BBC Radio 4;
- Merit Award: Do You Have to be Religious to Get Elected? – BBC World Service

=== 2006 ===
- Premier Award: Cities Without Maps – BBC Religion and Ethics
- Runner-up: Reporting Religion – BBC World Service

=== 2005 ===
- Premier Award: The Rainbow Through the Rain – Premier Christian Radio
- Runner-Up: Singing from a New Hymn Sheet from the series Crossing Continents – BBC Radio 4

=== 2004 ===
- Premier Award: The Choice – BBC Radio 4
- Runner-up: At the Foot of the Cross: Stainer's The Crucifixion – BBC Radio 2
