= Opinion polling for the 2021 German federal election =

In the run-up to the 2021 German federal election, various organisations carried out opinion polling to gauge voting intentions in Germany. Results of such polls are displayed in this list.

The date range for these opinion polls are from the previous federal election, held on 24 September 2017, to the election which was held on 26 September 2021.

== Graphical summary ==
Civey (SPON-Wahltrend) published daily data since 1 October 2017; however, its daily results are not accounted for in the trendlines below, and not included in the table below (except if an article on the figures is published in Spiegel Online), given notable methodological differences.

Local regression of polls conducted

== Poll results ==
=== 2021 ===
| Polling firm | Fieldwork date | Sample size | Abs. | Union | SPD | AfD | FDP | Linke | Grüne | FW | Others | Lead |
|---|---|---|---|---|---|---|---|---|---|---|---|---|
| 2021 federal election | 26 Sep 2021 | – | 23.4 | 24.2 | 25.7 | 10.4 | 11.4 | 4.9 | 14.7 | 2.4 | 6.3 | 1.5 |
| Wahlkreisprognose | 22–24 Sep 2021 | 1,400 | – | 22.5 | 25.5 | 11 | 12 | 7 | 14 | – | 8 | 3 |
| Ipsos | 22–23 Sep 2021 | 2,000 | – | 22 | 26 | 11 | 12 | 7 | 16 | – | 6 | 4 |
| Forschungsgruppe Wahlen | 22–23 Sep 2021 | 1,273 | – | 23 | 25 | 10 | 11 | 6 | 16.5 | 3 | 5.5 | 2 |
| Forsa | 20–23 Sep 2021 | 2,002 | 26 | 22 | 25 | 10 | 12 | 6 | 17 | 3 | 5 | 3 |
| Allensbach | 16–23 Sep 2021 | 1,554 | – | 25 | 26 | 10 | 10.5 | 5 | 16 | – | 7.5 | 1 |
| Civey | 16–23 Sep 2021 | 10,012 | – | 23 | 25 | 10 | 12 | 6 | 16 | – | 8 | 2 |
| YouGov | 16–22 Sep 2021 | 2,364 | – | 21 | 25 | 12 | 11 | 7 | 14 | 2 | 7 | 4 |
| Wahlkreisprognose | 20–21 Sep 2021 | 1,801 | – | 21.5 | 25 | 11 | 12.5 | 6.5 | 15 | – | 8.5 | 3.5 |
| Kantar | 15–21 Sep 2021 | 1,433 | – | 21 | 25 | 11 | 11 | 7 | 16 | – | 9 | 4 |
| INSA | 17–20 Sep 2021 | 2,054 | – | 22 | 25 | 11 | 12 | 6.5 | 15 | – | 8.5 | 3 |
| Forsa | 14–20 Sep 2021 | 2,502 | 25 | 22 | 25 | 11 | 11 | 6 | 17 | 3 | 5 | 3 |
| INSA | 13–17 Sep 2021 | 1,502 | – | 21 | 26 | 11 | 12 | 6 | 15 | 3 | 6 | 5 |
| Ipsos | 15–16 Sep 2021 | 2,000 | – | 21 | 27 | 11 | 10 | 7 | 18 | – | 6 | 6 |
| Forschungsgruppe Wahlen | 14–16 Sep 2021 | 1,406 | 22 | 22 | 25 | 11 | 11 | 6 | 16 | – | 9 | 3 |
| Trend Research | 13–16 Sep 2021 | 1,097 | – | 22 | 27 | 11 | 12 | 7 | 15 | – | 8 | 5 |
| Infratest dimap | 13–15 Sep 2021 | 1,512 | – | 22 | 26 | 11 | 11 | 6 | 15 | 3 | 6 | 4 |
| Wahlkreisprognose | 13–15 Sep 2021 | 1,400 | – | 20 | 27 | 11 | 12.5 | 6.5 | 15 | – | 8 | 7 |
| Civey | 8–15 Sep 2021 | 10,029 | – | 23 | 25 | 10 | 12 | 6 | 17 | – | 7 | 2 |
| YouGov | 9–14 Sep 2021 | 1,816 | – | 20 | 25 | 11 | 10 | 8 | 15 | 3 | 7 | 5 |
| Kantar | 8–14 Sep 2021 | 1,543 | – | 20 | 26 | 12 | 11 | 6 | 17 | – | 8 | 6 |
| INSA | 10–13 Sep 2021 | 2,062 | – | 20.5 | 26 | 11.5 | 12.5 | 6.5 | 15 | – | 8 | 5.5 |
| GMS | 8–13 Sep 2021 | 1,003 | – | 23 | 25 | 11 | 13 | 6 | 16 | – | 6 | 2 |
| Forsa | 7–13 Sep 2021 | 2,501 | 25 | 21 | 25 | 11 | 11 | 6 | 17 | 3 | 6 | 4 |
| INSA | 6–10 Sep 2021 | 1,152 | – | 20 | 26 | 11 | 13 | 6 | 15 | – | 9 | 6 |
| Forschungsgruppe Wahlen | 7–9 Sep 2021 | 1,281 | 25 | 22 | 25 | 11 | 11 | 6 | 17 | 3 | 5 | 3 |
| Kantar | 1–7 Sep 2021 | 1,901 | – | 21 | 25 | 12 | 12 | 6 | 17 | – | 7 | 4 |
| Wahlkreisprognose | 6–8 Sep 2021 | 1,208 | – | 19 | 28 | 11 | 12 | 6 | 14 | – | 10 | 9 |
| Civey | 31 Aug–8 Sep 2021 | 10,082 | – | 23 | 25 | 11 | 11 | 6 | 17 | – | 7 | 2 |
| YouGov | 3–7 Sep 2021 | 1,700 | – | 21 | 26 | 12 | 10 | 6 | 15 | – | 10 | 5 |
| Allensbach | 1–7 Sep 2021 | 1,258 | – | 25 | 27 | 11 | 9.5 | 6 | 15.5 | – | 6 | 2 |
| INSA | 3–6 Sep 2021 | 2,052 | – | 20.5 | 26 | 11 | 12.5 | 6.5 | 15.5 | 3 | 5 | 5.5 |
| GMS | 1–6 Sep 2021 | 1,004 | – | 23 | 25 | 11 | 12 | 6 | 17 | – | 6 | 2 |
| Forsa | 31 Aug–6 Sep 2021 | 2,505 | 22 | 19 | 25 | 11 | 13 | 6 | 17 | – | 9 | 6 |
| INSA | 30 Aug–3 Sep 2021 | 1,427 | – | 20 | 25 | 12 | 13 | 7 | 16 | – | 7 | 5 |
| Forschungsgruppe Wahlen | 31 Aug–2 Sep 2021 | 1,301 | 29 | 22 | 25 | 11 | 11 | 7 | 17 | – | 7 | 3 |
| Trend Research | 30 Aug–2 Sep 2021 | 1,065 | – | 20 | 26 | 12 | 13 | 7 | 15 | – | 7 | 6 |
| Infratest dimap | 30 Aug–1 Sep 2021 | 1,337 | – | 20 | 25 | 12 | 13 | 6 | 16 | – | 8 | 5 |
| Civey | 25 Aug–1 Sep 2021 | 10,032 | – | 23 | 25 | 10 | 11 | 6 | 18 | – | 7 | 2 |
| Wahlkreisprognose | 30–31 Aug 2021 | 2,340 | – | 19.5 | 27 | 10.5 | 13 | 6.5 | 15.5 | – | 8 | 7.5 |
| YouGov | 27–31 Aug 2021 | 1,729 | – | 20 | 25 | 12 | 13 | 8 | 15 | – | 8 | 5 |
| Kantar | 25–31 Aug 2021 | 1,439 | – | 21 | 25 | 11 | 11 | 7 | 19 | – | 6 | 4 |
| INSA | 27–30 Aug 2021 | 2,015 | – | 20 | 25 | 11 | 13.5 | 7 | 16.5 | – | 7 | 5 |
| Forsa | 24–30 Aug 2021 | 2,508 | 24 | 21 | 23 | 11 | 12 | 6 | 18 | – | 9 | 2 |
| Ipsos | 28–29 Aug 2021 | 2,001 | – | 21 | 25 | 11 | 11 | 7 | 19 | – | 6 | 4 |
| INSA | 23–27 Aug 2021 | 1,247 | – | 21 | 24 | 11 | 13 | 6 | 17 | – | 8 | 3 |
| Forschungsgruppe Wahlen | 24–26 Aug 2021 | 1,300 | 27 | 22 | 22 | 11 | 10 | 6 | 20 | 3 | 6 | Tie |
| Allensbach | 18–26 Aug 2021 | 1,038 | – | 26 | 24 | 10.5 | 10.5 | 6 | 17 | – | 6 | 2 |
| Civey | 18–25 Aug 2021 | 10,054 | – | 22 | 22 | 12 | 12 | 7 | 18 | – | 7 | Tie |
| YouGov | 20–24 Aug 2021 | 1,689 | – | 22 | 24 | 11 | 13 | 8 | 16 | – | 7 | 2 |
| Kantar | 18–24 Aug 2021 | 1,919 | – | 23 | 23 | 11 | 12 | 7 | 18 | – | 6 | Tie |
| INSA | 20–23 Aug 2021 | 2,119 | – | 23 | 23 | 11 | 13 | 7 | 17 | – | 6 | Tie |
| Forsa | 16–23 Aug 2021 | 2,504 | 26 | 22 | 23 | 10 | 12 | 6 | 18 | – | 9 | 1 |
| INSA | 16–20 Aug 2021 | 1,352 | – | 22 | 22 | 12 | 13 | 7 | 17 | – | 7 | Tie |
| Infratest dimap | 17–18 Aug 2021 | 1,219 | – | 23 | 21 | 11 | 13 | 7 | 17 | – | 8 | 2 |
| Trend Research | 12–18 Aug 2021 | 1,798 | – | 23 | 21 | 12 | 13 | 7 | 17 | – | 8 | 2 |
| Civey | 11–18 Aug 2021 | 10,117 | – | 24 | 19 | 11 | 12 | 7 | 20 | – | 7 | 4 |
| Wahlkreisprognose | 14–17 Aug 2021 | 2,005 | – | 22 | 22 | 11 | 11 | 7 | 17.5 | – | 9.5 | Tie |
| Kantar | 11–17 Aug 2021 | 1,920 | – | 22 | 21 | 11 | 12 | 7 | 19 | – | 8 | 1 |
| Allensbach | 5–17 Aug 2021 | 1,018 | – | 27.5 | 19.5 | 11 | 11 | 7.5 | 17.5 | – | 6 | 8 |
| INSA | 13–16 Aug 2021 | 2,080 | – | 25 | 20 | 11 | 12.5 | 6.5 | 17.5 | – | 7.5 | 5 |
| Forsa | 10–16 Aug 2021 | 2,501 | 26 | 23 | 21 | 10 | 12 | 6 | 19 | – | 9 | 2 |
| INSA | 9–13 Aug 2021 | 1,450 | – | 25 | 20 | 11 | 12 | 7 | 18 | – | 4 | 5 |
| Forschungsgruppe Wahlen | 10–12 Aug 2021 | 1,252 | 25 | 26 | 19 | 11 | 11 | 7 | 19 | – | 7 | 7 |
| Civey | 4–11 Aug 2021 | 10,116 | – | 24 | 18 | 11 | 12 | 7 | 20 | – | 8 | 4 |
| Kantar | 4–10 Aug 2021 | 1,446 | – | 22 | 19 | 11 | 12 | 7 | 21 | – | 8 | 1 |
| INSA | 6–9 Aug 2021 | 2,118 | – | 25.5 | 17.5 | 11.5 | 12.5 | 6.5 | 17.5 | 3.5 | 5.5 | 8 |
| Forsa | 3–9 Aug 2021 | 2,509 | 26 | 23 | 19 | 10 | 12 | 7 | 20 | – | 9 | 3 |
| INSA | 2–6 Aug 2021 | 2,002 | – | 26 | 18 | 11 | 12 | 7 | 18 | – | 8 | 8 |
| Infratest dimap | 2–4 Aug 2021 | 1,312 | – | 27 | 18 | 10 | 12 | 6 | 19 | – | 8 | 8 |
| Civey | 28 Jul – 4 Aug 2021 | 10,217 | – | 25 | 17 | 11 | 12 | 6 | 21 | – | 8 | 4 |
| Kantar | 28 Jul – 3 Aug 2021 | 1,413 | – | 24 | 18 | 11 | 13 | 6 | 22 | – | 6 | 2 |
| INSA | 30 Jul – 2 Aug 2021 | 2,080 | – | 27.5 | 18 | 11 | 13 | 7 | 18 | – | 5.5 | 9.5 |
| Forsa | 27 Jul – 2 Aug 2021 | 2,502 | 25 | 26 | 16 | 10 | 13 | 6 | 20 | – | 9 | 6 |
| Ipsos | 21–31 Jul 2021 | 2,002 | – | 27 | 18 | 11 | 10 | 7 | 20 | – | 7 | 7 |
| INSA | 26–30 Jul 2021 | 1,196 | – | 27 | 17 | 11 | 13 | 6 | 18 | – | 8 | 9 |
| Forschungsgruppe Wahlen | 27–29 Jul 2021 | 1,268 | 22 | 28 | 16 | 11 | 10 | 7 | 21 | 3 | 4 | 7 |
| Civey | 21–28 Jul 2021 | 10,111 | – | 26 | 17 | 11 | 12 | 7 | 21 | – | 6 | 5 |
| GMS | 21–27 Jul 2021 | 1,003 | – | 30 | 15 | 10 | 12 | 7 | 18 | – | 8 | 12 |
| Kantar | 20–27 Jul 2021 | 1,441 | – | 27 | 17 | 11 | 13 | 6 | 19 | – | 7 | 8 |
| YouGov | 23–26 Jul 2021 | 1,748 | – | 28 | 16 | 12 | 12 | 8 | 16 | – | 8 | 12 |
| INSA | 23–26 Jul 2021 | 2,007 | – | 27 | 17.5 | 12 | 13 | 6 | 17.5 | – | 7 | 9.5 |
| Forsa | 20–26 Jul 2021 | 2,501 | 25 | 26 | 15 | 10 | 13 | 7 | 21 | – | 8 | 5 |
| INSA | 19–23 Jul 2021 | 1,316 | – | 27 | 17 | 11 | 13 | 7 | 18 | – | 7 | 9 |
| Allensbach | 3–22 Jul 2021 | 1,243 | – | 30 | 16 | 9.5 | 12 | 7 | 19.5 | – | 6 | 10.5 |
| Infratest dimap | 20–21 Jul 2021 | 1,188 | – | 29 | 16 | 10 | 12 | 6 | 19 | 3 | 5 | 10 |
| Civey | 14–21 Jul 2021 | 9,999 | – | 26 | 17 | 11 | 11 | 6 | 21 | – | 8 | 5 |
| Kantar | 14–20 Jul 2021 | 1,421 | – | 28 | 16 | 11 | 12 | 7 | 19 | – | 7 | 9 |
| INSA | 16–19 Jul 2021 | 2,064 | – | 29 | 16.5 | 11.5 | 12 | 6 | 18 | – | 7 | 11 |
| Forsa | 13–19 Jul 2021 | 2,503 | 22 | 28 | 16 | 10 | 12 | 7 | 19 | – | 8 | 9 |
| INSA | 12–16 Jul 2021 | 1,354 | – | 28 | 17 | 11 | 12 | 7 | 18 | – | 7 | 10 |
| Forschungsgruppe Wahlen | 13–15 Jul 2021 | 1,224 | 27 | 30 | 15 | 10 | 10 | 7 | 20 | – | 8 | 10 |
| Civey | 7–14 Jul 2021 | 10,110 | – | 28 | 19 | 10 | 11 | 6 | 20 | – | 6 | 8 |
| Allensbach (intermediate result) | 3–14 Jul 2021 | 1,028 | – | 31.5 | 16.5 | 9.5 | 12 | 6.5 | 18 | – | 6 | 13.5 |
| Kantar | 7–13 Jul 2021 | 1,495 | – | 28 | 15 | 11 | 11 | 8 | 20 | – | 7 | 8 |
| INSA | 9–12 Jul 2021 | 2,087 | – | 28 | 17 | 11 | 12.5 | 7 | 17 | – | 7.5 | 11 |
| Forsa | 6–12 Jul 2021 | 2,502 | 22 | 30 | 15 | 9 | 12 | 7 | 19 | – | 8 | 11 |
| INSA | 5–9 Jul 2021 | 1,352 | – | 28 | 17 | 11 | 12 | 8 | 17 | – | 7 | 11 |
| Civey | 30 Jun – 7 Jul 2021 | 10,069 | – | 30 | 18 | 9 | 11 | 6 | 21 | – | 5 | 9 |
| Kantar | 29 Jun – 6 Jul 2021 | 1,405 | – | 29 | 15 | 11 | 11 | 8 | 19 | – | 7 | 10 |
| INSA | 2–5 Jul 2021 | 2,056 | – | 29 | 16.5 | 10 | 12.5 | 7 | 18 | – | 7 | 11 |
| Forsa | 29 Jun – 5 Jul 2021 | 2,505 | 22 | 30 | 15 | 10 | 11 | 7 | 19 | – | 8 | 11 |
| INSA | 28 Jun – 2 Jul 2021 | 1,352 | – | 28 | 17 | 10 | 12 | 7 | 18 | – | 8 | 10 |
| Infratest dimap | 28–30 Jun 2021 | 1,317 | – | 28 | 15 | 11 | 11 | 7 | 20 | – | 8 | 8 |
| Civey | 23–30 Jun 2021 | 10,068 | – | 29 | 17 | 9 | 12 | 6 | 22 | – | 5 | 7 |
| Kantar | 23–29 Jun 2021 | 1,418 | – | 28 | 16 | 11 | 10 | 7 | 20 | – | 8 | 8 |
| YouGov | 25–28 Jun 2021 | 1,648 | – | 30 | 15 | 11 | 11 | 7 | 19 | – | 7 | 11 |
| INSA | 25–28 Jun 2021 | 2,060 | – | 29.5 | 16 | 11 | 13 | 7.5 | 18 | – | 5 | 11.5 |
| Forsa | 22–28 Jun 2021 | 2,501 | 22 | 30 | 14 | 9 | 12 | 7 | 20 | – | 8 | 10 |
| Ipsos | 21–27 Jun 2021 | 2,002 | – | 28 | 15 | 10 | 11 | 8 | 21 | – | 7 | 7 |
| INSA | 21–25 Jun 2021 | 1,203 | – | 28 | 17 | 11 | 12 | 7 | 19 | – | 6 | 9 |
| Forschungsgruppe Wahlen | 22–24 Jun 2021 | 1,271 | 24 | 29 | 14 | 10 | 10 | 7 | 22 | – | 8 | 7 |
| Infratest dimap | 22–23 Jun 2021 | 1,217 | – | 28 | 15 | 12 | 11 | 6 | 21 | – | 7 | 7 |
| Civey | 16–23 Jun 2021 | 10,087 | – | 30 | 16 | 9 | 12 | 6 | 22 | – | 5 | 8 |
| Kantar | 15–22 Jun 2021 | 1,430 | – | 28 | 17 | 10 | 11 | 7 | 19 | – | 8 | 9 |
| Forsa | 15–21 Jun 2021 | 2,502 | 24 | 29 | 15 | 9 | 13 | 6 | 21 | – | 7 | 8 |
| INSA | 18–21 Jun 2021 | 2,082 | – | 28.5 | 15.5 | 10.5 | 14 | 7 | 19 | – | 5.5 | 9.5 |
| GMS | 16–21 Jun 2021 | 1,002 | – | 28 | 16 | 10 | 12 | 8 | 20 | – | 6 | 8 |
| Forsa | 15–21 Jun 2021 | 2,502 | 24 | 29 | 15 | 9 | 13 | 6 | 21 | – | 7 | 8 |
| INSA | 14–18 Jun 2021 | 1,502 | – | 28 | 16 | 11 | 13 | 6 | 20 | – | 6 | 8 |
| Civey | 9–16 Jun 2021 | 10,094 | – | 30 | 16 | 9 | 13 | 6 | 21 | – | 5 | 9 |
| Kantar | 9–15 Jun 2021 | 1,413 | – | 27 | 17 | 10 | 12 | 7 | 20 | – | 7 | 7 |
| INSA | 11–14 Jun 2021 | 2,038 | – | 27.5 | 16.5 | 11 | 13.5 | 6 | 19.5 | – | 6 | 8 |
| Forsa | 8–14 Jun 2021 | 2,501 | 24 | 28 | 14 | 9 | 14 | 7 | 21 | – | 7 | 7 |
| INSA | 7–11 Jun 2021 | 1,401 | – | 27 | 16 | 11 | 13 | 7 | 20 | – | 6 | 7 |
| Redfield & Wilton Strategies | 8–9 Jun 2021 | 1,500 | – | 23 | 18 | 13 | 14 | 12 | 15 | – | 6 | 5 |
| Infratest dimap | 7–9 Jun 2021 | 1,316 | – | 28 | 14 | 12 | 12 | 7 | 20 | – | 7 | 8 |
| Forschungsgruppe Wahlen | 7–9 Jun 2021 | 1,232 | 21 | 28 | 15 | 11 | 10 | 7 | 22 | 3 | 4 | 6 |
| Civey | 2–9 Jun 2021 | 10,096 | – | 29 | 16 | 10 | 12 | 6 | 21 | – | 6 | 8 |
| Allensbach | 28 May – 9 Jun 2021 | 1,070 | – | 29.5 | 17 | 9 | 11 | 7 | 21.5 | – | 5 | 8 |
| Kantar | 2–8 Jun 2021 | 1,421 | – | 26 | 16 | 11 | 13 | 7 | 21 | – | 6 | 5 |
| INSA | 4–7 Jun 2021 | 2,015 | – | 26.5 | 15.5 | 11 | 13.5 | 7 | 20.5 | – | 6 | 6 |
| Forsa | 1–7 Jun 2021 | 2,501 | 24 | 27 | 14 | 9 | 14 | 6 | 22 | – | 8 | 5 |
| INSA | 31 May – 4 Jun 2021 | 1,380 | – | 26 | 17 | 12 | 12 | 6 | 21 | – | 6 | 5 |
| Civey | 26 May – 2 Jun 2021 | 10,015 | – | 29 | 16 | 10 | 12 | 6 | 22 | – | 5 | 7 |
| Kantar | 26 May – 1 Jun 2021 | 1,419 | – | 24 | 16 | 11 | 13 | 7 | 22 | – | 7 | 2 |
| INSA | 28–31 May 2021 | 2,040 | – | 25.5 | 15.5 | 11 | 13.5 | 6.5 | 21.5 | – | 6.5 | 4 |
| Forsa | 25–31 May 2021 | 2,500 | 26 | 25 | 14 | 9 | 14 | 6 | 24 | – | 8 | 1 |
| INSA | 25–28 May 2021 | 1,301 | – | 25 | 16 | 12 | 13 | 7 | 22 | – | 5 | 3 |
| INSA | 21–25 May 2021 | 2,128 | – | 26 | 16 | 11.5 | 12.5 | 6.5 | 22 | – | 5.5 | 4 |
| Kantar | 19–25 May 2021 | 1,422 | – | 25 | 15 | 12 | 12 | 7 | 23 | – | 6 | 2 |
| Civey | 19–25 May 2021 | 10,016 | – | 27 | 16 | 10 | 13 | 6 | 23 | – | 5 | 4 |
| Ipsos | 18–25 May 2021 | 2,014 | – | 25 | 13 | 13 | 11 | 9 | 23 | – | 6 | 2 |
| YouGov | 21–24 May 2021 | 1,706 | – | 26 | 15 | 11 | 12 | 7 | 22 | – | 7 | 4 |
| Forsa | 18–21 May 2021 | 2,004 | 24 | 24 | 14 | 10 | 13 | 6 | 25 | – | 8 | 1 |
| INSA | 17–21 May 2021 | 1,405 | – | 24 | 17 | 12 | 13 | 6 | 23 | – | 5 | 1 |
| Forschungsgruppe Wahlen | 18–20 May 2021 | 1,229 | 22 | 24 | 14 | 11 | 11 | 7 | 25 | 3 | 5 | 1 |
| Civey | 12–19 May 2021 | 10,050 | – | 26 | 16 | 10 | 12 | 6 | 23 | – | 7 | 4 |
| Kantar | 11–18 May 2021 | 1,445 | – | 26 | 14 | 11 | 11 | 8 | 24 | – | 6 | 2 |
| INSA | 14–17 May 2021 | 2,023 | – | 25.5 | 16 | 11 | 12.5 | 6.5 | 23 | – | 5.5 | 2.5 |
| Forsa | 11–17 May 2021 | 2,001 | 24 | 24 | 15 | 10 | 11 | 6 | 26 | – | 8 | 2 |
| GMS | 11–17 May 2021 | 1,005 | – | 26 | 15 | 11 | 11 | 7 | 24 | – | 6 | 2 |
| INSA | 10–14 May 2021 | 1,350 | – | 25 | 16 | 12 | 11 | 7 | 24 | – | 5 | 1 |
| Allensbach | 1–13 May 2021 | 1,027 | – | 27.5 | 16 | 10 | 10 | 6.5 | 24 | – | 6 | 3.5 |
| Infratest dimap | 10–11 May 2021 | 1,198 | – | 24 | 15 | 11 | 12 | 7 | 25 | – | 6 | 1 |
| Kantar | 6–11 May 2021 | 1,428 | – | 24 | 15 | 11 | 11 | 8 | 25 | – | 6 | 1 |
| INSA | 7–10 May 2021 | 2,055 | – | 25.5 | 15 | 11 | 12 | 7.5 | 23.5 | – | 5.5 | 2 |
| Forsa | 4–10 May 2021 | 2,501 | 24 | 24 | 15 | 10 | 11 | 6 | 27 | – | 7 | 3 |
| Redfield & Wilton Strategies | 5–6 May 2021 | 1,950 | – | 22 | 16 | 11 | 12 | 11 | 21 | – | 7 | 1 |
| Forschungsgruppe Wahlen | 4–6 May 2021 | 1,271 | 25 | 25 | 14 | 11 | 10 | 7 | 26 | – | 7 | 1 |
| Infratest dimap | 3–5 May 2021 | 1,351 | – | 23 | 14 | 12 | 11 | 6 | 26 | 3 | 8 | 3 |
| Kantar | 29 Apr – 5 May 2021 | 1,910 | – | 23 | 16 | 10 | 12 | 7 | 26 | – | 6 | 3 |
| Civey | 28 Apr – 5 May 2021 | 10,028 | – | 27 | 15 | 9 | 11 | 6 | 25 | – | 7 | 2 |
| INSA | 30 Apr – 3 May 2021 | 2,075 | – | 24 | 15 | 12 | 12 | 7 | 24 | – | 6 | Tie |
| Forsa | 27 Apr – 3 May 2021 | 2,508 | 26 | 23 | 14 | 10 | 12 | 6 | 28 | – | 7 | 5 |
| Kantar | 22–28 Apr 2021 | 1,442 | – | 24 | 15 | 10 | 11 | 7 | 27 | – | 6 | 3 |
| INSA | 23–26 Apr 2021 | 2,082 | – | 23 | 16 | 12 | 12 | 8 | 23 | – | 6 | Tie |
| YouGov | 23–26 Apr 2021 | 1,643 | – | 24 | 14 | 11 | 11 | 8 | 25 | – | 7 | 1 |
| Forsa | 20–26 Apr 2021 | 2,507 | 25 | 22 | 13 | 11 | 12 | 7 | 28 | – | 7 | 6 |
| Civey | 19–26 Apr 2021 | 10,039 | – | 24 | 15 | 9 | 11 | 6 | 29 | – | 6 | 5 |
| INSA (intermediate result) | 23 Apr 2021 | 1,000 | – | 24 | 17 | 11 | 12 | 8 | 23 | – | 5 | 1 |
| Kantar | 15–21 Apr 2021 | 1,225 | – | 27 | 13 | 10 | 9 | 7 | 28 | – | 6 | 1 |
| Civey | 14–21 Apr 2021 | 10,064 | – | 29 | 15 | 10 | 9 | 7 | 25 | – | 6 | 4 |
| Forsa (intermediate result) | 20 Apr 2021 | 1,502 | 25 | 21 | 13 | 11 | 12 | 7 | 28 | – | 8 | 7 |
| INSA | 20 Apr 2021 | 1,000 | – | 27 | 16 | 12 | 11 | 7 | 22 | – | 5 | 5 |
| INSA | 16–19 Apr 2021 | 3,057 | – | 28 | 16 | 12 | 11 | 7 | 21 | – | 5 | 7 |
| Forsa | 13–16 Apr 2021 | 2,003 | 23 | 28 | 15 | 11 | 10 | 6 | 23 | – | 7 | 5 |
| INSA | 15 Apr 2021 | 1,007 | – | 28 | 18 | 12 | 10 | 8 | 20 | – | 4 | 8 |
| Forschungsgruppe Wahlen | 13–15 Apr 2021 | 1,292 | 25 | 31 | 14 | 11 | 9 | 7 | 21 | – | 7 | 10 |
| Allensbach | 6–15 Apr 2021 | 1,051 | – | 28 | 16.5 | 9.5 | 10 | 7.5 | 23 | – | 5.5 | 5 |
| Infratest dimap | 13–14 Apr 2021 | 1,174 | – | 28 | 15 | 11 | 11 | 7 | 21 | – | 7 | 7 |
| Kantar | 8–14 Apr 2021 | 1,437 | – | 29 | 15 | 11 | 9 | 8 | 22 | – | 6 | 7 |
| INSA | 9–12 Apr 2021 | 3,174 | – | 27.5 | 17 | 12 | 10 | 7 | 20.5 | – | 6 | 7 |
| Forsa | 6–12 Apr 2021 | 2,500 | 23 | 27 | 15 | 11 | 9 | 8 | 23 | – | 7 | 4 |
| Kantar | 31 Mar – 7 Apr 2021 | 1,448 | – | 27 | 15 | 11 | 9 | 9 | 22 | – | 7 | 5 |
| INSA | 30 Mar – 1 Apr 2021 | 3,020 | – | 27 | 17 | 12 | 10 | 7 | 21 | – | 6 | 6 |
| Forsa | 30 Mar – 1 Apr 2021 | 1,501 | 21 | 27 | 15 | 10 | 10 | 7 | 23 | – | 8 | 4 |
| Kantar | 25–31 Mar 2021 | 1,429 | – | 26 | 16 | 10 | 9 | 9 | 23 | – | 7 | 3 |
| Infratest dimap | 29–30 Mar 2021 | 1,348 | – | 27 | 16 | 11 | 9 | 7 | 22 | – | 8 | 5 |
| INSA | 26–29 Mar 2021 | 3,049 | – | 26 | 18 | 11 | 10.5 | 7 | 21 | – | 6.5 | 5 |
| YouGov | 25–29 Mar 2021 | 1,637 | – | 27 | 17 | 11 | 10 | 8 | 21 | – | 6 | 6 |
| GMS | 24–29 Mar 2021 | 1,003 | – | 26 | 16 | 11 | 11 | 8 | 21 | – | 7 | 5 |
| Forsa | 23–29 Mar 2021 | 2,503 | 22 | 27 | 15 | 11 | 10 | 7 | 23 | – | 7 | 4 |
| Forschungsgruppe Wahlen | 23–25 Mar 2021 | 1,030 | 25 | 28 | 15 | 12 | 9 | 7 | 23 | – | 6 | 5 |
| Kantar | 18–24 Mar 2021 | 1,447 | – | 25 | 17 | 10 | 10 | 9 | 23 | – | 6 | 2 |
| Civey | 17–24 Mar 2021 | 10,066 | – | 28 | 16 | 10 | 9 | 7 | 23 | – | 7 | 5 |
| INSA | 19–22 Mar 2021 | 3,104 | – | 28 | 18 | 11 | 10.5 | 7 | 20 | – | 5.5 | 8 |
| Forsa | 16–22 Mar 2021 | 2,511 | 21 | 26 | 16 | 10 | 10 | 8 | 22 | – | 8 | 4 |
| Allensbach | 8–21 Mar 2021 | 1,006 | – | 28.5 | 18 | 10 | 8.5 | 8.5 | 21.5 | – | 5 | 7 |
| INSA (intermediate result) | 19 Mar 2021 | 1,042 | – | 28 | 18 | 11 | 10 | 8 | 20 | – | 5 | 8 |
| Infratest dimap | 15–17 Mar 2021 | 1,207 | – | 29 | 17 | 11 | 9 | 7 | 20 | – | 7 | 9 |
| Kantar | 11–17 Mar 2021 | 1,942 | – | 27 | 17 | 10 | 10 | 8 | 22 | – | 6 | 5 |
| Civey | 10–17 Mar 2021 | 10,045 | – | 29 | 17 | 11 | 9 | 8 | 21 | – | 7 | 8 |
| INSA | 12–15 Mar 2021 | 2,068 | – | 29.5 | 17 | 11.5 | 10.5 | 8 | 17 | – | 6.5 | 12.5 |
| Forsa | 9–15 Mar 2021 | 2,501 | 22 | 29 | 16 | 10 | 8 | 8 | 21 | – | 8 | 8 |
| Kantar | 4–10 Mar 2021 | 2,378 | – | 31 | 16 | 11 | 8 | 8 | 19 | – | 7 | 12 |
| INSA | 5–8 Mar 2021 | 2,049 | – | 30 | 17 | 11.5 | 10.5 | 9 | 17 | – | 5 | 13 |
| Forsa | 2–8 Mar 2021 | 2,510 | 22 | 33 | 16 | 10 | 8 | 8 | 18 | – | 7 | 15 |
| Kantar | 25 Feb – 3 Mar 2021 | 2,410 | – | 32 | 16 | 10 | 9 | 9 | 19 | – | 5 | 13 |
| Infratest dimap | 1–2 Mar 2021 | 1,296 | – | 33 | 16 | 11 | 7 | 7 | 20 | – | 6 | 13 |
| INSA | 26 Feb – 1 Mar 2021 | 2,032 | – | 32.5 | 17 | 11 | 10 | 8 | 17 | – | 4.5 | 15.5 |
| Forsa | 25 Feb – 1 Mar 2021 | 2,501 | 24 | 34 | 16 | 9 | 7 | 8 | 19 | – | 7 | 15 |
| Forschungsgruppe Wahlen | 23–25 Feb 2021 | 1,202 | 25 | 35 | 16 | 10 | 7 | 7 | 19 | – | 6 | 16 |
| Kantar | 18–24 Feb 2021 | 1,869 | – | 34 | 16 | 9 | 8 | 9 | 18 | – | 6 | 16 |
| INSA | 19–22 Feb 2021 | 2,075 | – | 33.5 | 16 | 11 | 9 | 8 | 17 | – | 5.5 | 16.5 |
| YouGov | 18–22 Feb 2021 | 1,619 | – | 33 | 16 | 11 | 8 | 8 | 18 | – | 6 | 15 |
| Forsa | 16–22 Feb 2021 | 2,505 | 23 | 35 | 16 | 8 | 8 | 7 | 19 | – | 7 | 16 |
| Infratest dimap | 15–17 Feb 2021 | 1,025 | – | 33 | 16 | 11 | 8 | 6 | 20 | – | 6 | 13 |
| Kantar | 11–17 Feb 2021 | 1,905 | – | 34 | 16 | 9 | 8 | 8 | 19 | – | 6 | 15 |
| Allensbach | 4–17 Feb 2021 | 1,082 | – | 37 | 15 | 9.5 | 7 | 7 | 20 | – | 4.5 | 17 |
| INSA | 12–15 Feb 2021 | 2,051 | – | 33.5 | 17 | 10.5 | 9 | 9 | 17 | – | 4 | 16.5 |
| GMS | 10–15 Feb 2021 | 1,005 | – | 37 | 17 | 9 | 7 | 7 | 18 | – | 5 | 19 |
| Forsa | 9–15 Feb 2021 | 2,502 | 21 | 35 | 16 | 8 | 7 | 8 | 19 | – | 7 | 16 |
| Kantar | 4–10 Feb 2021 | 1,569 | – | 35 | 17 | 10 | 8 | 7 | 18 | – | 5 | 17 |
| INSA | 5–8 Feb 2021 | 2,107 | – | 34.5 | 16 | 10.5 | 9 | 8.5 | 17.5 | – | 4 | 17 |
| Forsa | 2–8 Feb 2021 | 2,501 | 21 | 37 | 15 | 8 | 7 | 7 | 19 | – | 7 | 18 |
| Infratest dimap | 1–3 Feb 2021 | 1,503 | – | 34 | 15 | 10 | 8 | 6 | 21 | – | 6 | 13 |
| Kantar | 28 Jan – 3 Feb 2021 | 1,412 | – | 36 | 16 | 9 | 7 | 7 | 19 | – | 6 | 17 |
| YouGov | 29 Jan – 1 Feb 2021 | 1,606 | – | 36 | 15 | 10 | 7 | 9 | 18 | – | 5 | 18 |
| INSA | 29 Jan – 1 Feb 2021 | 2,044 | – | 36.5 | 15 | 11 | 8 | 7.5 | 17 | – | 5 | 19.5 |
| Forsa | 26 Jan – 1 Feb 2021 | 2,503 | 23 | 37 | 15 | 8 | 6 | 8 | 19 | – | 7 | 18 |
| Forschungsgruppe Wahlen | 25–27 Jan 2021 | 1,371 | 22 | 37 | 15 | 9 | 6 | 7 | 20 | – | 6 | 17 |
| Kantar | 21–27 Jan 2021 | 1,427 | – | 36 | 15 | 9 | 7 | 8 | 19 | – | 6 | 17 |
| INSA | 22–25 Jan 2021 | 2,038 | – | 35 | 16 | 10 | 8 | 8 | 17 | – | 6 | 18 |
| Forsa | 18–25 Jan 2021 | 3,005 | 23 | 37 | 15 | 9 | 7 | 7 | 18 | – | 7 | 19 |
| Infratest dimap | 18–20 Jan 2021 | 1,027 | – | 34 | 15 | 10 | 7 | 6 | 21 | – | 7 | 13 |
| Kantar | 14–20 Jan 2021 | 1,922 | – | 35 | 15 | 9 | 7 | 8 | 20 | – | 6 | 15 |
| Allensbach | 10–20 Jan 2021 | 1,080 | – | 37 | 16 | 9 | 6.5 | 7.5 | 20 | – | 4 | 17 |
| INSA (intermediate result) | 17–18 Jan 2021 | 1,835 | – | 35 | 15 | 11 | 9 | 8 | 17 | – | 5 | 18 |
| INSA | 15–18 Jan 2021 | / | – | 35.5 | 14 | 11 | 8.5 | 7.5 | 17.5 | – | 6 | 18 |
| Forsa | 16–17 Jan 2021 | 2,014 | 24 | 35 | 15 | 9 | 7 | 8 | 19 | – | 7 | 16 |
| Forsa | 11–15 Jan 2021 | 2,504 | 24 | 35 | 15 | 9 | 6 | 8 | 20 | – | 7 | 15 |
| Forschungsgruppe Wahlen | 12–14 Jan 2021 | 1,262 | 24 | 37 | 15 | 10 | 5 | 8 | 20 | – | 5 | 17 |
| Kantar | 5–13 Jan 2021 | 2,398 | – | 36 | 15 | 10 | 7 | 8 | 18 | – | 6 | 18 |
| INSA | 8–11 Jan 2021 | 2,042 | – | 36 | 15 | 10 | 7.5 | 8 | 18 | – | 5.5 | 18 |
| Forsa | 4–8 Jan 2021 | 2,503 | 21 | 36 | 14 | 8 | 7 | 8 | 20 | – | 7 | 16 |
| Infratest dimap | 4–6 Jan 2021 | 1,520 | – | 35 | 14 | 10 | 7 | 7 | 21 | – | 6 | 14 |
| YouGov | 30 Dec 2020 – 5 Jan 2021 | 1,588 | – | 36 | 15 | 10 | 6 | 9 | 18 | – | 6 | 18 |
| INSA | 1–4 Jan 2021 | 2,072 | – | 36 | 15 | 11 | 7.5 | 7.5 | 18 | – | 5 | 18 |
| GMS | 29 Dec 2020 – 4 Jan 2021 | 1,004 | – | 37 | 16 | 9 | 6 | 8 | 18 | – | 6 | 19 |
| 2017 federal election | 24 Sep 2017 | – | 23.8 | 32.9 | 20.5 | 12.6 | 10.7 | 9.2 | 8.9 | 1.0 | 4.0 | 12.4 |

=== 2020 ===
| Polling firm | Fieldwork date | Sample size | Abs. | Union | SPD | AfD | FDP | Linke | Grüne | Others | Lead |
|---|---|---|---|---|---|---|---|---|---|---|---|
| Forsa | 21–23 Dec 2020 | 1,501 | – | 36 | 15 | 9 | 6 | 9 | 18 | 7 | 18 |
| INSA | 18–21 Dec 2020 | 2,055 | – | 35 | 16 | 11 | 8 | 7.5 | 16.5 | 6 | 18.5 |
| Forsa | 14–18 Dec 2020 | 2,505 | 23 | 37 | 15 | 8 | 6 | 8 | 19 | 7 | 18 |
| Kantar | 10–16 Dec 2020 | 2,401 | – | 35 | 17 | 10 | 6 | 8 | 19 | 5 | 16 |
| INSA | 11–14 Dec 2020 | 2,002 | – | 36 | 17 | 10 | 7 | 7.5 | 17 | 5.5 | 19 |
| Forsa | 7–11 Dec 2020 | 2,503 | 23 | 37 | 15 | 8 | 5 | 8 | 20 | 7 | 17 |
| Allensbach | 28 Nov–10 Dec 2020 | 1,022 | – | 37 | 16.5 | 9 | 7 | 7 | 19 | 4.5 | 18 |
| Infratest dimap | 7–9 Dec 2020 | 1,004 | – | 36 | 16 | 9 | 6 | 7 | 20 | 6 | 16 |
| Forschungsgruppe Wahlen | 7–9 Dec 2020 | 1,246 | 25 | 37 | 16 | 10 | 5 | 8 | 20 | 4 | 17 |
| Kantar | 3–9 Dec 2020 | 2,374 | – | 35 | 16 | 10 | 7 | 7 | 19 | 6 | 16 |
| INSA | 4–7 Dec 2020 | 2,057 | – | 35.5 | 15.5 | 10 | 8 | 7.5 | 17.5 | 6 | 18 |
| Forsa | 30 Nov–4 Dec 2020 | 2,507 | 21 | 36 | 15 | 8 | 6 | 8 | 20 | 7 | 16 |
| Infratest dimap | 30 Nov–2 Dec 2020 | 1,507 | – | 36 | 15 | 10 | 6 | 7 | 21 | 5 | 15 |
| Kantar | 26 Nov–2 Dec 2020 | 1,438 | – | 35 | 15 | 10 | 7 | 8 | 19 | 6 | 16 |
| INSA | 27–30 Nov 2020 | 2,046 | – | 35.5 | 15.5 | 11 | 7.5 | 7 | 17.5 | 6 | 18 |
| Forsa | 23–27 Nov 2020 | 2,500 | 23 | 37 | 15 | 7 | 6 | 8 | 21 | 6 | 16 |
| Forschungsgruppe Wahlen | 24–26 Nov 2020 | 1,330 | 24 | 37 | 16 | 9 | 5 | 7 | 21 | 5 | 16 |
| Infratest dimap | 24–25 Nov 2020 | 1,047 | – | 35 | 15 | 11 | 7 | 7 | 21 | 4 | 14 |
| Kantar | 19–25 Nov 2020 | 1,517 | – | 34 | 16 | 9 | 8 | 8 | 18 | 7 | 16 |
| INSA | 20–23 Nov 2020 | 2,063 | – | 36 | 15.5 | 11 | 7 | 7 | 17.5 | 6 | 18.5 |
| YouGov | 19–23 Nov 2020 | 1,632 | – | 37 | 15 | 10 | 6 | 9 | 18 | 5 | 19 |
| Forsa | 16–19 Nov 2020 | 2,505 | 23 | 36 | 16 | 9 | 6 | 7 | 19 | 7 | 17 |
| Kantar | 12–18 Nov 2020 | 1,927 | – | 36 | 16 | 9 | 7 | 7 | 18 | 7 | 16 |
| INSA | 13–16 Nov 2020 | 2,077 | – | 36.5 | 15.5 | 11 | 7 | 7.5 | 17.5 | 5 | 19 |
| Forsa | 9–13 Nov 2020 | 2,502 | 22 | 36 | 15 | 10 | 5 | 8 | 19 | 7 | 17 |
| Forschungsgruppe Wahlen | 10–12 Nov 2020 | 1,347 | 20 | 37 | 16 | 9 | 5 | 7 | 20 | 6 | 17 |
| Infratest dimap | 9–11 Nov 2020 | 1,504 | – | 36 | 15 | 10 | 6 | 7 | 20 | 6 | 16 |
| Kantar | 5–11 Nov 2020 | 2,405 | – | 35 | 15 | 9 | 7 | 8 | 19 | 7 | 16 |
| Allensbach | 1–11 Nov 2020 | 1,286 | – | 37 | 17 | 9.5 | 6.5 | 7.5 | 18 | 4.5 | 19 |
| INSA | 6–9 Nov 2020 | 2,030 | – | 34.5 | 15.5 | 12 | 7 | 7.5 | 17.5 | 6 | 17 |
| GMS | 4–9 Nov 2020 | 1,007 | – | 37 | 15 | 10 | 5 | 7 | 19 | 7 | 18 |
| Forsa | 2–6 Nov 2020 | 2,502 | 22 | 36 | 15 | 10 | 6 | 8 | 18 | 7 | 18 |
| Kantar | 29 Oct–4 Nov 2020 | 1,415 | – | 36 | 16 | 9 | 7 | 8 | 18 | 6 | 18 |
| INSA | 30 Oct–2 Nov 2020 | 2,035 | – | 34.5 | 15.5 | 11 | 6.5 | 8.5 | 18 | 6 | 16.5 |
| Forsa | 26–30 Oct 2020 | 2,503 | 22 | 35 | 16 | 10 | 6 | 8 | 19 | 6 | 16 |
| Kantar | 22–28 Oct 2020 | 1,987 | – | 35 | 15 | 10 | 7 | 8 | 19 | 6 | 16 |
| INSA | 23–26 Oct 2020 | 2,069 | – | 35.5 | 14.5 | 12 | 6.5 | 7.5 | 17.5 | 6.5 | 18 |
| YouGov | 22–26 Oct 2020 | 1,656 | – | 35 | 15 | 12 | 6 | 9 | 18 | 5 | 17 |
| Forsa | 19–23 Oct 2020 | 2,503 | 22 | 36 | 15 | 9 | 6 | 7 | 20 | 7 | 16 |
| Forschungsgruppe Wahlen | 20–22 Oct 2020 | 1,297 | 23 | 38 | 15 | 9 | 5 | 8 | 20 | 5 | 18 |
| Kantar | 15–21 Oct 2020 | 1,434 | – | 35 | 15 | 11 | 6 | 8 | 19 | 6 | 16 |
| Allensbach | 07–20 Oct 2020 | 1,045 | – | 35.5 | 17 | 10 | 6 | 7 | 20 | 4.5 | 15.5 |
| INSA | 16–19 Oct 2020 | 2,074 | – | 35 | 14.5 | 11.5 | 7.5 | 8 | 18 | 5.5 | 17 |
| Forsa | 12–16 Oct 2020 | 2,501 | 23 | 36 | 15 | 9 | 6 | 7 | 20 | 7 | 16 |
| Infratest dimap | 12–14 Oct 2020 | 1,038 | – | 35 | 15 | 11 | 6 | 7 | 20 | 6 | 15 |
| Kantar | 8–14 Oct 2020 | 2,407 | – | 35 | 16 | 10 | 6 | 8 | 19 | 6 | 16 |
| INSA | 9–12 Oct 2020 | 2,084 | – | 35 | 14.5 | 11 | 7 | 8 | 18.5 | 6 | 16.5 |
| GMS | 7–12 Oct 2020 | 2,084 | – | 36 | 16 | 10 | 5 | 7 | 20 | 6 | 16 |
| Forsa | 5–9 Oct 2020 | 2,504 | 21 | 36 | 15 | 9 | 5 | 8 | 20 | 7 | 16 |
| Forschungsgruppe Wahlen | 6–8 Oct 2020 | 1,229 | 20 | 37 | 16 | 10 | 5 | 7 | 20 | 5 | 17 |
| Kantar | 1–7 Oct 2020 | 1,411 | – | 34 | 17 | 9 | 5 | 8 | 20 | 7 | 14 |
| INSA | 2–5 Oct 2020 | 2,058 | – | 36 | 14.5 | 11.5 | 7 | 6 | 18.5 | 6.5 | 17.5 |
| Forsa | 29 Sep–2 Oct 2020 | 2,502 | 22 | 36 | 15 | 9 | 6 | 7 | 20 | 7 | 16 |
| Infratest dimap | 28–30 Sep 2020 | 1,501 | – | 35 | 15 | 10 | 6 | 8 | 21 | 5 | 14 |
| Kantar | 22–30 Sep 2020 | 2,397 | – | 35 | 16 | 11 | 6 | 9 | 18 | 5 | 18 |
| INSA | 25–28 Sep 2020 | 2,065 | – | 35 | 15.5 | 11.5 | 6.5 | 6.5 | 19 | 6 | 16 |
| Forsa | 21–25 Sep 2020 | 2,504 | 23 | 35 | 15 | 9 | 6 | 8 | 21 | 6 | 14 |
| Kantar | 17–23 Sep 2020 | 1,509 | – | 36 | 16 | 11 | 6 | 8 | 18 | 5 | 18 |
| YouGov | 19–21 Sep 2020 | 1,623 | – | 35 | 15 | 12 | 5 | 9 | 18 | 6 | 17 |
| INSA | 18–21 Sep 2020 | 2,067 | – | 35 | 15.5 | 12 | 6.5 | 7.5 | 17.5 | 6 | 17.5 |
| Forsa | 14–18 Sep 2020 | 2,501 | 22 | 36 | 14 | 8 | 5 | 8 | 22 | 7 | 14 |
| Infratest dimap | 15–16 Sep 2020 | 1,051 | – | 36 | 16 | 10 | 5 | 8 | 20 | 5 | 16 |
| Forschungsgruppe Wahlen | 14–16 Sep 2020 | 1,241 | 20 | 37 | 17 | 10 | 5 | 7 | 19 | 5 | 18 |
| Kantar | 10–16 Sep 2020 | 1,534 | – | 36 | 16 | 11 | 5 | 8 | 18 | 6 | 18 |
| Allensbach | 4–16 Sep 2020 | 1,043 | – | 37 | 17 | 9 | 6 | 7 | 19.5 | 4.5 | 17.5 |
| INSA | 11–14 Sep 2020 | 2,036 | – | 35.5 | 16 | 11.5 | 7 | 7.5 | 17 | 5.5 | 18.5 |
| Forsa | 7–11 Sep 2020 | 2,501 | 23 | 36 | 16 | 9 | 5 | 9 | 18 | 7 | 18 |
| Kantar | 3–9 Sep 2020 | 1,446 | – | 36 | 17 | 10 | 6 | 8 | 18 | 5 | 18 |
| INSA | 4–7 Sep 2020 | 2,068 | – | 35 | 16 | 11 | 6.5 | 8 | 18 | 5.5 | 17 |
| Forsa | 31 Aug–4 Sep 2020 | 2,503 | 22 | 36 | 16 | 9 | 5 | 9 | 18 | 7 | 18 |
| Infratest dimap | 31 Aug–2 Sep 2020 | 1,527 | – | 36 | 17 | 10 | 6 | 7 | 19 | 5 | 17 |
| Kantar | 27 Aug–2 Sep 2020 | 1,447 | – | 36 | 17 | 11 | 6 | 7 | 18 | 5 | 18 |
| INSA | 28–31 Aug 2020 | 2,068 | – | 36.5 | 16 | 11 | 6 | 7.5 | 17.5 | 5.5 | 19 |
| Forsa | 24–28 Aug 2020 | 2,502 | 23 | 36 | 16 | 9 | 5 | 7 | 19 | 8 | 17 |
| Forschungsgruppe Wahlen | 25–27 Aug 2020 | 1,303 | 25 | 38 | 16 | 9 | 5 | 8 | 19 | 5 | 19 |
| Kantar | 18–26 Aug 2020 | 1,597 | – | 36 | 16 | 11 | 6 | 8 | 18 | 5 | 18 |
| YouGov | 20–24 Aug 2020 | 1,611 | – | 36 | 16 | 11 | 5 | 8 | 18 | 6 | 18 |
| INSA | 21–24 Aug 2020 | 2,067 | – | 35.5 | 17 | 11 | 6.5 | 9 | 16 | 5 | 18.5 |
| Forsa | 17–21 Aug 2020 | 2,504 | 23 | 36 | 16 | 9 | 5 | 7 | 19 | 8 | 17 |
| Kantar | 13–19 Aug 2020 | 2,107 | – | 36 | 17 | 10 | 7 | 8 | 16 | 6 | 19 |
| Infratest dimap | 18–19 Aug 2020 | 1,065 | – | 37 | 16 | 10 | 6 | 8 | 17 | 6 | 20 |
| Allensbach | 5–18 Aug 2020 | 1,231 | – | 38 | 17 | 9 | 5.5 | 7 | 19 | 4.5 | 18 |
| INSA | 14–17 Aug 2020 | 2,101 | – | 36 | 18 | 11 | 6 | 8 | 16 | 5 | 18 |
| Forsa | 10–14 Aug 2020 | 2,501 | 22 | 36 | 16 | 9 | 6 | 6 | 20 | 7 | 16 |
| Kantar | 6–12 Aug 2020 | 1,912 | – | 36 | 18 | 11 | 6 | 8 | 16 | 5 | 18 |
| INSA | 11 Aug 2020 | 1,012 | – | 36 | 18 | 11 | 7 | 9 | 15 | 4 | 18 |
| Forsa | 3–7 Aug 2020 | 2,502 | 22 | 38 | 14 | 8 | 6 | 8 | 18 | 8 | 20 |
| Kantar | 30 Jul–6 Aug 2020 | 1,564 | – | 38 | 15 | 11 | 6 | 8 | 18 | 4 | 20 |
| Infratest dimap | 3–5 Aug 2020 | 1,511 | – | 38 | 15 | 11 | 6 | 7 | 18 | 5 | 20 |
| YouGov | 30 Jul–4 Aug 2020 | 1,623 | – | 36 | 14 | 11 | 6 | 9 | 18 | 6 | 18 |
| INSA | 31 Jul–3 Aug 2020 | 2,090 | – | 36.5 | 15 | 11 | 6.5 | 8.5 | 16.5 | 6 | 20 |
| Forsa | 27–31 Jul 2020 | 2,504 | 22 | 38 | 14 | 8 | 6 | 8 | 18 | 8 | 20 |
| Forschungsgruppe Wahlen | 28–30 Jul 2020 | 1,249 | 22 | 38 | 14 | 9 | 5 | 8 | 21 | 5 | 17 |
| Kantar | 23–29 Jul 2020 | 1,449 | – | 37 | 16 | 10 | 6 | 8 | 17 | 6 | 20 |
| INSA | 24–27 Jul 2020 | 2,039 | – | 36.5 | 15 | 11 | 7 | 8 | 16 | 6.5 | 20.5 |
| GMS | 22–27 Jul 2020 | 1,003 | – | 38 | 14 | 10 | 6 | 6 | 19 | 7 | 19 |
| Forsa | 20–24 Jul 2020 | 2,504 | 23 | 38 | 14 | 9 | 6 | 8 | 18 | 7 | 20 |
| Infratest dimap | 21–22 Jul 2020 | 1,064 | – | 37 | 14 | 11 | 5 | 7 | 20 | 6 | 17 |
| Kantar | 16–22 Jul 2020 | 2,031 | – | 37 | 15 | 11 | 6 | 8 | 18 | 5 | 19 |
| INSA | 17–20 Jul 2020 | 2,049 | – | 36.5 | 16 | 10 | 7.5 | 7.5 | 16 | 6.5 | 20.5 |
| Forsa | 13–16 Jul 2020 | 2,501 | 23 | 38 | 14 | 9 | 6 | 8 | 18 | 7 | 20 |
| Allensbach | 3–16 Jul 2020 | 1,237 | – | 38 | 15.5 | 9 | 5.5 | 7.5 | 20 | 4.5 | 18 |
| Kantar | 9–15 Jul 2020 | 1,449 | – | 38 | 16 | 10 | 6 | 8 | 17 | 5 | 21 |
| INSA | 10–13 Jul 2020 | 2,051 | – | 37 | 14.5 | 11 | 7 | 8.5 | 16.5 | 5.5 | 20.5 |
| Forsa | 6–10 Jul 2020 | 2,500 | 24 | 38 | 14 | 10 | 6 | 7 | 18 | 7 | 20 |
| Forschungsgruppe Wahlen | 7–9 Jul 2020 | 1,226 | 19 | 39 | 15 | 9 | 5 | 7 | 20 | 5 | 19 |
| Kantar | 2–8 Jul 2020 | 1,426 | – | 38 | 15 | 11 | 6 | 8 | 17 | 5 | 21 |
| INSA | 3–6 Jul 2020 | 2,040 | – | 36 | 15 | 11 | 7 | 8 | 17 | 6 | 19 |
| Forsa | 29 Jun–3 Jul 2020 | 2,503 | 27 | 38 | 14 | 10 | 5 | 8 | 18 | 7 | 20 |
| Kantar | 24 Jun–2 Jul 2020 | 1,436 | – | 37 | 16 | 10 | 6 | 8 | 19 | 4 | 18 |
| Infratest dimap | 29 Jun–1 Jul 2020 | 1,503 | – | 37 | 16 | 10 | 5 | 7 | 20 | 5 | 17 |
| INSA | 26–29 Jun 2020 | 2,051 | – | 36.5 | 16 | 10.5 | 7 | 8 | 17 | 5 | 19.5 |
| Forsa | 22–26 Jun 2020 | 2,501 | 27 | 38 | 14 | 10 | 6 | 8 | 17 | 7 | 21 |
| Forschungsgruppe Wahlen | 23–25 Jun 2020 | 1,227 | 22 | 40 | 15 | 9 | 5 | 7 | 19 | 5 | 21 |
| Infratest dimap | 23–24 Jun 2020 | 1,068 | – | 37 | 16 | 10 | 5 | 7 | 20 | 5 | 17 |
| Kantar | 18–24 Jun 2020 | 1,550 | – | 37 | 16 | 10 | 6 | 8 | 18 | 5 | 19 |
| INSA | 19–22 Jun 2020 | 2,058 | – | 36.5 | 15 | 10 | 6 | 8.5 | 18.5 | 5.5 | 18 |
| YouGov | 18–22 Jun 2020 | 1,636 | – | 37 | 15 | 11 | 5 | 9 | 17 | 6 | 20 |
| Forsa | 15–19 Jun 2020 | 2,501 | 25 | 39 | 14 | 9 | 5 | 8 | 18 | 7 | 21 |
| Kantar | 10–17 Jun 2020 | 2,403 | – | 38 | 15 | 10 | 7 | 8 | 17 | 5 | 21 |
| INSA | 12–15 Jun 2020 | 2,069 | – | 37 | 15 | 10 | 7 | 8 | 18 | 5 | 19 |
| GMS | 9–15 Jun 2020 | 1,002 | – | 39 | 15 | 9 | 6 | 8 | 17 | 6 | 22 |
| Forsa | 8–13 Jun 2020 | 2,504 | 26 | 40 | 14 | 8 | 6 | 8 | 17 | 7 | 23 |
| Allensbach | 1–13 Jun 2020 | 1,314 | – | 40 | 16 | 9.5 | 4.5 | 7 | 18.5 | 4.5 | 21.5 |
| Forschungsgruppe Wahlen | 8–10 Jun 2020 | 1,270 | 21 | 39 | 15 | 9 | 4 | 7 | 20 | 6 | 19 |
| Kantar | 4–9 Jun 2020 | 1,934 | – | 39 | 15 | 9 | 7 | 7 | 17 | 6 | 22 |
| INSA | 5–8 Jun 2020 | 2,051 | – | 38 | 14 | 10 | 6.5 | 8.5 | 17.5 | 5.5 | 20.5 |
| Forsa | 2–5 Jun 2020 | 2,002 | 27 | 40 | 16 | 8 | 6 | 8 | 15 | 7 | 24 |
| Infratest dimap | 2–3 Jun 2020 | 1,505 | – | 38 | 15 | 9 | 6 | 8 | 19 | 5 | 19 |
| Kantar | 28 May–3 Jun 2020 | 1,428 | – | 38 | 15 | 8 | 7 | 8 | 16 | 8 | 22 |
| INSA | 29 May–2 Jun 2020 | 2,047 | – | 38.5 | 14 | 10 | 5.5 | 8 | 18 | 6 | 20.5 |
| Forsa | 27–29 May 2020 | 1,507 | 26 | 40 | 15 | 9 | 5 | 8 | 16 | 7 | 24 |
| Forschungsgruppe Wahlen | 26–28 May 2020 | 1,377 | 24 | 39 | 15 | 9 | 4 | 8 | 19 | 6 | 20 |
| Kantar | 20–26 May 2020 | 1,934 | – | 40 | 16 | 9 | 8 | 7 | 15 | 5 | 24 |
| YouGov | 20–26 May 2020 | 1,584 | – | 37 | 15 | 11 | 5 | 9 | 16 | 7 | 21 |
| INSA | 22–25 May 2020 | 2,062 | – | 37 | 15 | 9.5 | 6 | 8 | 18 | 6.5 | 19 |
| Forsa | 18–22 May 2020 | 2,002 | 26 | 40 | 15 | 9 | 5 | 8 | 16 | 7 | 24 |
| Kantar | 14–19 May 2020 | 1,914 | – | 38 | 16 | 10 | 7 | 8 | 15 | 6 | 22 |
| INSA | 15–18 May 2020 | 2,092 | – | 37 | 14 | 10.5 | 6 | 7.5 | 18 | 7 | 19 |
| Forsa | 11–15 May 2020 | 2,509 | 25 | 39 | 15 | 9 | 6 | 8 | 16 | 7 | 23 |
| Forschungsgruppe Wahlen | 12–14 May 2020 | 1,282 | 23 | 38 | 15 | 10 | 5 | 8 | 18 | 6 | 20 |
| Allensbach | 6–14 May 2020 | 1,013 | – | 38 | 15.5 | 9 | 5.5 | 7 | 19 | 6 | 19 |
| Infratest dimap | 12–13 May 2020 | 1,074 | – | 38 | 15 | 10 | 6 | 7 | 18 | 6 | 20 |
| Kantar | 7–13 May 2020 | 1,559 | – | 39 | 16 | 11 | 6 | 8 | 14 | 6 | 23 |
| INSA | 8–11 May 2020 | 2,061 | – | 37.5 | 14 | 11 | 6.5 | 7.5 | 16.5 | 7 | 21 |
| Forsa | 4–8 May 2020 | 2,503 | 27 | 40 | 15 | 10 | 6 | 7 | 15 | 7 | 25 |
| Infratest dimap | 4–6 May 2020 | 1,503 | – | 39 | 16 | 9 | 5 | 8 | 18 | 5 | 21 |
| Kantar | 30 Apr–6 May 2020 | 1,426 | – | 38 | 17 | 12 | 5 | 8 | 14 | 6 | 21 |
| INSA | 1–4 May 2020 | 2,101 | – | 37.5 | 15 | 11 | 6 | 7.5 | 17 | 6 | 20.5 |
| Forsa | 27–30 Apr 2020 | 2,004 | 26 | 38 | 17 | 10 | 6 | 8 | 14 | 7 | 21 |
| Kantar | 22–29 Apr 2020 | 1,443 | – | 37 | 15 | 12 | 6 | 9 | 15 | 6 | 22 |
| INSA | 24–27 Apr 2020 | 2,071 | – | 38 | 15.5 | 10.5 | 7 | 7 | 16 | 6 | 22 |
| YouGov | 23–27 Apr 2020 | 1,636 | – | 37 | 16 | 11 | 5 | 9 | 16 | 6 | 21 |
| GMS | 20–27 Apr 2020 | 1,002 | – | 38 | 16 | 10 | 6 | 8 | 16 | 6 | 22 |
| Forsa | 20–24 Apr 2020 | 2,505 | 24 | 39 | 16 | 9 | 6 | 8 | 15 | 7 | 23 |
| Forschungsgruppe Wahlen | 20–23 Apr 2020 | 1,323 | 23 | 39 | 16 | 9 | 5 | 7 | 18 | 6 | 21 |
| Kantar | 16–22 Apr 2020 | 2,003 | – | 38 | 16 | 11 | 6 | 9 | 15 | 5 | 22 |
| INSA | 17–20 Apr 2020 | 2,054 | – | 38.5 | 15 | 10.5 | 7 | 7.5 | 16 | 5.5 | 22.5 |
| Forsa | 14–17 Apr 2020 | 2,002 | 25 | 39 | 16 | 10 | 5 | 8 | 15 | 7 | 23 |
| Infratest dimap | 14–15 Apr 2020 | 1,057 | – | 38 | 17 | 9 | 5 | 7 | 19 | 5 | 19 |
| Kantar | 9–15 Apr 2020 | 1,534 | – | 37 | 18 | 9 | 7 | 8 | 16 | 5 | 19 |
| Allensbach | 1–15 Apr 2020 | 1,152 | – | 38 | 16 | 9 | 6 | 7 | 19 | 5 | 19 |
| INSA | 9–14 Apr 2020 | 2,108 | – | 37.5 | 16 | 10.5 | 7 | 7.5 | 16 | 5.5 | 21.5 |
| Forsa | 6–9 Apr 2020 | 2,001 | – | 37 | 17 | 10 | 5 | 8 | 16 | 7 | 20 |
| Forschungsgruppe Wahlen | 6–8 Apr 2020 | 1,175 | 23 | 35 | 17 | 10 | 5 | 7 | 20 | 6 | 15 |
| Kantar | 2–8 Apr 2020 | 1,912 | – | 37 | 17 | 10 | 6 | 9 | 16 | 5 | 20 |
| INSA | 3–6 Apr 2020 | 2,062 | – | 38 | 16 | 10 | 5.5 | 7 | 18 | 5.5 | 20 |
| Forsa | 30 Mar–3 Apr 2020 | 2,506 | 25 | 37 | 17 | 9 | 6 | 8 | 16 | 7 | 20 |
| Infratest dimap | 30 Mar–1 Apr 2020 | 1,502 | – | 34 | 16 | 10 | 5 | 7 | 22 | 6 | 12 |
| Kantar | 25 Mar–1 Apr 2020 | 1,426 | – | 33 | 18 | 11 | 6 | 9 | 18 | 5 | 15 |
| YouGov | 27–30 Mar 2020 | 1,615 | – | 34 | 16 | 12 | 6 | 9 | 18 | 5 | 16 |
| INSA | 27–30 Mar 2020 | 2,061 | – | 35 | 15 | 12 | 6.5 | 7.5 | 18 | 6 | 17 |
| Forsa | 23–27 Mar 2020 | 2,511 | 25 | 36 | 16 | 9 | 6 | 8 | 17 | 8 | 19 |
| Forschungsgruppe Wahlen | 23–26 Mar 2020 | 1,473 | 28 | 33 | 15 | 10 | 6 | 8 | 22 | 6 | 11 |
| Forsa | 23–25 Mar 2020 | 1,502 | 24 | 36 | 16 | 9 | 6 | 8 | 17 | 8 | 19 |
| Kantar | 18–25 Mar 2020 | 1,441 | – | 32 | 18 | 11 | 6 | 9 | 19 | 5 | 13 |
| INSA | 20–23 Mar 2020 | 2,070 | – | 33.5 | 15 | 12 | 6.5 | 7 | 20 | 6 | 13.5 |
| Forsa | 16–20 Mar 2020 | 2,504 | 24 | 32 | 15 | 9 | 7 | 9 | 20 | 8 | 12 |
| Infratest dimap | 17–18 Mar 2020 | 1,035 | – | 30 | 14 | 10 | 7 | 9 | 23 | 7 | 7 |
| Kantar | 12–18 Mar 2020 | 1,603 | – | 28 | 16 | 13 | 7 | 9 | 21 | 6 | 7 |
| Allensbach | 5–18 Mar 2020 | 1,219 | – | 29 | 16.5 | 11.5 | 7 | 8 | 23 | 5 | 6 |
| INSA | 13–16 Mar 2020 | 2,049 | – | 28.5 | 14.5 | 13 | 6.5 | 9.5 | 23 | 5 | 5.5 |
| Forsa | 9–13 Mar 2020 | 2,503 | 22 | 29 | 14 | 11 | 6 | 10 | 22 | 8 | 7 |
| Kantar | 4–11 Mar 2020 | 1,414 | – | 26 | 17 | 14 | 7 | 8 | 21 | 7 | 5 |
| INSA | 6–9 Mar 2020 | 2,050 | – | 26.5 | 15.5 | 14 | 6.5 | 9.5 | 22 | 6 | 4.5 |
| Forsa | 2–6 Mar 2020 | 2,503 | 27 | 26 | 15 | 11 | 6 | 10 | 24 | 8 | 2 |
| Forschungsgruppe Wahlen | 3–5 Mar 2020 | 1,276 | 26 | 26 | 16 | 14 | 6 | 8 | 23 | 7 | 3 |
| Infratest dimap | 2–4 Mar 2020 | 1,502 | – | 27 | 16 | 12 | 6 | 9 | 23 | 7 | 4 |
| Kantar | 27 Feb–4 Mar 2020 | 1,423 | – | 24 | 17 | 14 | 7 | 9 | 22 | 7 | 2 |
| YouGov | 28 Feb–2 Mar 2020 | 1,632 | – | 27 | 15 | 14 | 6 | 10 | 21 | 7 | 6 |
| INSA | 28 Feb–2 Mar 2020 | 2,061 | – | 26.5 | 16 | 13.5 | 6 | 10 | 23 | 5 | 3.5 |
| Forsa | 24–28 Feb 2020 | 2,505 | 25 | 27 | 16 | 10 | 5 | 10 | 24 | 8 | 3 |
| Kantar | 20–27 Feb 2020 | 1,509 | – | 25 | 16 | 14 | 6 | 10 | 22 | 7 | 3 |
| INSA | 21–24 Feb 2020 | 2,033 | – | 26.5 | 14.5 | 13 | 7 | 10.5 | 22 | 6.5 | 4.5 |
| Forsa | 17–21 Feb 2020 | 2,504 | – | 27 | 14 | 10 | 7 | 10 | 24 | 8 | 3 |
| Kantar | 13–19 Feb 2020 | 1,417 | – | 27 | 15 | 14 | 7 | 10 | 20 | 7 | 7 |
| INSA | 14–17 Feb 2020 | 2,065 | – | 26.5 | 14.5 | 15 | 7.5 | 9.5 | 20.5 | 6.5 | 6 |
| Forsa | 10–14 Feb 2020 | 2,502 | 20 | 27 | 14 | 11 | 6 | 10 | 24 | 8 | 3 |
| Infratest dimap | 11–13 Feb 2020 | 1,007 | – | 26 | 16 | 14 | 7 | 9 | 22 | 6 | 4 |
| Kantar | 6–12 Feb 2020 | 1,886 | – | 28 | 15 | 15 | 6 | 10 | 20 | 6 | 8 |
| Allensbach | 1–12 Feb 2020 | 1,262 | – | 27.5 | 14.5 | 13 | 8 | 9.5 | 23 | 4.5 | 4.5 |
| INSA | 7–10 Feb 2020 | 2,086 | – | 27.5 | 12.5 | 14 | 8 | 10 | 22 | 6 | 5.5 |
| Forsa | 3–7 Feb 2020 | 2,504 | – | 28 | 14 | 10 | 8 | 9 | 23 | 8 | 5 |
| Forschungsgruppe Wahlen | 4–6 Feb 2020 | 1,067 | 21 | 27 | 14 | 14 | 6 | 10 | 22 | 7 | 5 |
| Infratest dimap | 3–5 Feb 2020 | 1,503 | – | 27 | 14 | 14 | 8 | 9 | 22 | 6 | 5 |
| Kantar | 30 Jan–5 Feb 2020 | 1,889 | – | 28 | 15 | 15 | 8 | 9 | 20 | 5 | 8 |
| INSA | 31 Jan–3 Feb 2020 | 2,059 | – | 28 | 13 | 14 | 9 | 8 | 22 | 6 | 6 |
| Forsa | 27–31 Jan 2020 | 2,504 | 24 | 28 | 12 | 11 | 9 | 9 | 23 | 8 | 5 |
| Kantar | 23–29 Jan 2020 | 1,442 | – | 27 | 15 | 14 | 8 | 9 | 21 | 6 | 6 |
| INSA | 24–27 Jan 2020 | 2,081 | – | 27 | 14 | 15 | 9 | 8.5 | 20.5 | 6 | 6.5 |
| Forsa | 20–24 Jan 2020 | 2,507 | – | 28 | 12 | 12 | 9 | 9 | 23 | 7 | 5 |
| Infratest dimap | 21–22 Jan 2020 | 1,043 | – | 26 | 14 | 14 | 8 | 8 | 24 | 6 | 2 |
| Kantar | 16–22 Jan 2020 | 2,100 | – | 26 | 14 | 15 | 9 | 10 | 21 | 5 | 5 |
| Allensbach | 9–22 Jan 2020 | 1,273 | – | 28.5 | 14 | 13 | 8 | 8 | 23.5 | 5 | 5 |
| INSA | 17–20 Jan 2020 | 2,122 | – | 27.5 | 13 | 15 | 8.5 | 9.5 | 21 | 5.5 | 6.5 |
| Forsa | 13–17 Jan 2020 | 2,504 | 22 | 28 | 13 | 13 | 8 | 9 | 22 | 7 | 6 |
| Forschungsgruppe Wahlen | 13–15 Jan 2020 | 1,282 | 23 | 27 | 14 | 14 | 7 | 9 | 23 | 6 | 4 |
| Kantar | 9–15 Jan 2020 | 2,009 | – | 26 | 15 | 14 | 9 | 9 | 21 | 6 | 5 |
| INSA | 10–13 Jan 2020 | 2,040 | – | 27 | 12.5 | 15 | 9.5 | 9 | 21 | 6 | 6 |
| Forsa | 6–10 Jan 2020 | 2,503 | 23 | 28 | 12 | 13 | 9 | 8 | 22 | 8 | 6 |
| Infratest dimap | 7–8 Jan 2020 | 1,506 | – | 27 | 13 | 14 | 9 | 8 | 23 | 6 | 4 |
| Kantar | 19 Dec 2019–8 Jan 2020 | 1,829 | – | 27 | 14 | 14 | 9 | 9 | 21 | 6 | 6 |
| INSA | 3–6 Jan 2020 | 2,048 | – | 29 | 13 | 14 | 9 | 8.5 | 21.5 | 5 | 7.5 |
| GMS | 27 Dec 2019–2 Jan 2020 | 1,005 | – | 28 | 13 | 14 | 9 | 8 | 21 | 7 | 7 |
| 2017 federal election | 24 Sep 2017 | – | 23.8 | 32.9 | 20.5 | 12.6 | 10.7 | 9.2 | 8.9 | 5.0 | 12.4 |

=== 2019 ===
| Polling firm | Fieldwork date | Sample size | Abs. | Union | SPD | AfD | FDP | Linke | Grüne | Others | Lead |
|---|---|---|---|---|---|---|---|---|---|---|---|
| INSA | 20–23 Dec 2019 | 2,034 | – | 28 | 13 | 15 | 10 | 8 | 21 | 5 | 7 |
| Forsa | 16–20 Dec 2019 | 2,501 | 23 | 28 | 13 | 13 | 8 | 8 | 22 | 8 | 6 |
| Emnid | 12–18 Dec 2019 | 1,899 | – | 27 | 15 | 14 | 9 | 9 | 20 | 6 | 7 |
| YouGov | 13–17 Dec 2019 | 1,586 | – | 27 | 13 | 15 | 7 | 10 | 21 | 7 | 6 |
| INSA | 13–16 Dec 2019 | 2,020 | – | 27 | 13 | 15 | 8.5 | 9.5 | 21 | 6 | 6 |
| Forsa | 9–13 Dec 2019 | 2,502 | 22 | 28 | 12 | 13 | 8 | 9 | 22 | 8 | 6 |
| Forschungsgruppe Wahlen | 10–12 Dec 2019 | 1,366 | – | 27 | 13 | 14 | 8 | 9 | 23 | 6 | 4 |
| Infratest dimap | 10–11 Dec 2019 | 1,038 | – | 27 | 14 | 15 | 8 | 8 | 21 | 7 | 6 |
| Emnid | 5–11 Dec 2019 | 1,978 | – | 28 | 16 | 13 | 9 | 9 | 20 | 5 | 8 |
| Allensbach | 1–11 Dec 2019 | 1,270 | – | 28.5 | 15 | 15 | 7 | 8.5 | 21 | 5 | 7.5 |
| INSA | 6–9 Dec 2019 | 2,052 | – | 28 | 14 | 15 | 8.5 | 8.5 | 20.5 | 5.5 | 7.5 |
| Forsa | 2–6 Dec 2019 | 2,502 | 24 | 28 | 11 | 14 | 9 | 8 | 22 | 8 | 6 |
| Infratest dimap | 2–4 Dec 2019 | 1,507 | – | 25 | 13 | 15 | 9 | 8 | 23 | 7 | 2 |
| Emnid | 28 Nov–4 Dec 2019 | 1,876 | – | 28 | 16 | 13 | 8 | 9 | 20 | 6 | 8 |
| INSA | 29 Nov–2 Dec 2019 | 2,060 | – | 26.5 | 13.5 | 15 | 8.5 | 9 | 21.5 | 6 | 5 |
| GMS | 27 Nov–2 Dec 2019 | 1,004 | – | 27 | 14 | 15 | 9 | 8 | 21 | 6 | 6 |
| Forsa | 25–29 Nov 2019 | 2,500 | 23 | 27 | 14 | 13 | 8 | 8 | 22 | 8 | 5 |
| Forschungsgruppe Wahlen | 26–28 Nov 2019 | 1,340 | – | 27 | 13 | 14 | 7 | 10 | 23 | 6 | 4 |
| Emnid | 20–27 Nov 2019 | 1,910 | – | 28 | 15 | 14 | 8 | 9 | 20 | 6 | 8 |
| YouGov | 22–26 Nov 2019 | 1,648 | – | 26 | 13 | 15 | 7 | 10 | 22 | 7 | 4 |
| INSA | 22–25 Nov 2019 | 2,069 | – | 26.5 | 14.5 | 14 | 8.5 | 9.5 | 22 | 5 | 4.5 |
| Forsa | 18–22 Nov 2019 | 2,501 | 22 | 26 | 14 | 13 | 9 | 9 | 21 | 8 | 5 |
| Emnid | 13–20 Nov 2019 | 1,905 | – | 28 | 15 | 13 | 9 | 9 | 20 | 6 | 8 |
| INSA | 15–18 Nov 2019 | 4,115 | – | 25 | 15.5 | 15 | 8.5 | 10 | 21 | 5 | 4 |
| Forsa | 11–15 Nov 2019 | 2,501 | 23 | 26 | 15 | 13 | 9 | 10 | 19 | 8 | 7 |
| Civey | 7–14 Nov 2019 | 10,198 | – | 27.7 | 14.3 | 13.1 | 8.7 | 9.6 | 20.5 | 6.1 | 7.2 |
| Infratest dimap | 12–13 Nov 2019 | 1,046 | – | 25 | 15 | 14 | 7 | 9 | 22 | 8 | 3 |
| Emnid | 7–13 Nov 2019 | 1,525 | – | 27 | 17 | 14 | 8 | 10 | 18 | 6 | 9 |
| Allensbach | 2–13 Nov 2019 | 1,298 | – | 29.5 | 14 | 14.5 | 7.5 | 8 | 21.5 | 5 | 8 |
| INSA | 8–11 Nov 2019 | 2,096 | – | 25.5 | 15.5 | 15 | 8 | 9.5 | 20.5 | 6 | 5 |
| Forsa | 4–8 Nov 2019 | 2,501 | 24 | 26 | 13 | 13 | 9 | 10 | 21 | 8 | 5 |
| Forschungsgruppe Wahlen | 5–7 Nov 2019 | 1,264 | – | 27 | 14 | 14 | 7 | 10 | 22 | 6 | 5 |
| Infratest dimap | 4–6 Nov 2019 | 1,507 | – | 26 | 14 | 14 | 8 | 9 | 22 | 7 | 4 |
| Emnid | 30 Oct–6 Nov 2019 | 1,431 | – | 26 | 16 | 14 | 10 | 10 | 18 | 6 | 8 |
| YouGov | 31 Oct–5 Nov 2019 | 1,583 | – | 27 | 13 | 14 | 7 | 10 | 22 | 7 | 5 |
| INSA | 1–4 Nov 2019 | 2,047 | – | 25.5 | 13.5 | 16 | 8 | 10 | 21 | 6 | 4.5 |
| Forsa | 28 Oct–1 Nov 2019 | 2,502 | 25 | 28 | 13 | 13 | 8 | 10 | 20 | 8 | 8 |
| Emnid | 24–30 Oct 2019 | 1,920 | – | 27 | 16 | 15 | 9 | 9 | 18 | 6 | 9 |
| INSA | 25–28 Oct 2019 | 2,042 | – | 26 | 13.5 | 15.5 | 7.5 | 9 | 23 | 5.5 | 3 |
| Forsa | 21–25 Oct 2019 | 2,501 | 22 | 29 | 14 | 13 | 8 | 8 | 20 | 8 | 9 |
| Emnid | 17–23 Oct 2019 | 1,441 | – | 29 | 15 | 14 | 8 | 9 | 20 | 5 | 9 |
| INSA | 18–21 Oct 2019 | 2,041 | – | 27 | 13.5 | 15 | 7.5 | 9 | 22.5 | 5.5 | 4.5 |
| Forsa | 14–18 Oct 2019 | 2,501 | 22 | 27 | 14 | 13 | 8 | 8 | 22 | 8 | 5 |
| Forschungsgruppe Wahlen | 15–17 Oct 2019 | 1,226 | – | 29 | 14 | 13 | 6 | 8 | 24 | 6 | 5 |
| Infratest dimap | 14–16 Oct 2019 | 1,062 | – | 28 | 14 | 14 | 7 | 8 | 22 | 7 | 6 |
| Emnid | 10–16 Oct 2019 | 1,444 | – | 29 | 15 | 13 | 7 | 9 | 20 | 7 | 9 |
| INSA | 11–14 Oct 2019 | 2,052 | – | 28 | 14 | 15 | 7.5 | 8 | 21.5 | 6 | 6.5 |
| Forsa | 7–11 Oct 2019 | 2,500 | 22 | 27 | 14 | 12 | 8 | 8 | 23 | 8 | 4 |
| Allensbach | 29 Sep–10 Oct 2019 | 1,238 | – | 29.5 | 16 | 13 | 6.5 | 7 | 23.5 | 4.5 | 6 |
| Infratest dimap | 7–9 Oct 2019 | 1,504 | – | 28 | 13 | 14 | 7 | 8 | 24 | 6 | 4 |
| Emnid | 2–9 Oct 2019 | 1,916 | – | 28 | 14 | 15 | 7 | 8 | 21 | 7 | 7 |
| INSA | 4–7 Oct 2019 | 2,059 | – | 27 | 13 | 16 | 8.5 | 9 | 21 | 5.5 | 6 |
| GMS | 1–7 Oct 2019 | 1,002 | – | 27 | 14 | 15 | 8 | 7 | 22 | 7 | 5 |
| Forsa | 30 Sep–4 Oct 2019 | 2,505 | 22 | 28 | 14 | 13 | 8 | 7 | 22 | 8 | 6 |
| YouGov | 27 Sep–1 Oct 2019 | 1,573 | – | 26 | 13 | 15 | 8 | 8 | 22 | 8 | 4 |
| Emnid | 26 Sep–1 Oct 2019 | 1,449 | – | 27 | 15 | 15 | 8 | 8 | 21 | 6 | 6 |
| INSA | 27–30 Sep 2019 | 2,058 | – | 26.5 | 13 | 16 | 8 | 8 | 22 | 6.5 | 4.5 |
| Forsa | 23–27 Sep 2019 | 2,505 | 20 | 27 | 13 | 13 | 9 | 7 | 23 | 8 | 4 |
| Forschungsgruppe Wahlen | 24–26 Sep 2019 | 1,325 | – | 27 | 13 | 14 | 6 | 7 | 27 | 6 | Tie |
| Emnid | 19–25 Sep 2019 | 1,719 | – | 27 | 16 | 15 | 7 | 8 | 21 | 6 | 6 |
| INSA | 20–23 Sep 2019 | 2,052 | – | 26 | 14 | 16 | 8 | 8 | 22 | 6 | 4 |
| Forsa | 16–20 Sep 2019 | 2,500 | 21 | 27 | 15 | 13 | 8 | 7 | 22 | 8 | 5 |
| Infratest dimap | 17–18 Sep 2019 | 1,067 | – | 27 | 14 | 14 | 8 | 8 | 23 | 6 | 4 |
| Emnid | 12–18 Sep 2019 | 1,639 | – | 29 | 15 | 14 | 8 | 8 | 21 | 5 | 8 |
| INSA | 13–16 Sep 2019 | 2,053 | – | 26.5 | 13.5 | 16 | 7.5 | 7.5 | 22.5 | 6.5 | 4 |
| Forsa | 9–13 Sep 2019 | 2,503 | 21 | 27 | 15 | 14 | 8 | 7 | 22 | 7 | 5 |
| GMS | 6–12 Sep 2019 | 1,005 | – | 27 | 16 | 12 | 7 | 8 | 23 | 7 | 4 |
| Allensbach | 1–12 Sep 2019 | 1,255 | – | 29 | 15 | 14 | 7 | 8 | 22 | 5 | 7 |
| Emnid | 5–11 Sep 2019 | 2,835 | – | 28 | 16 | 15 | 8 | 7 | 21 | 5 | 7 |
| YouGov | 6–10 Sep 2019 | 1,632 | – | 27 | 15 | 14 | 6 | 8 | 22 | 8 | 5 |
| INSA | 6–9 Sep 2019 | 2,033 | – | 27 | 13.5 | 15.5 | 8 | 7.5 | 22 | 6.5 | 5 |
| Civey | 5–9 Sep 2019 | 10,100 | – | 28.7 | 14.7 | 13.8 | 7.8 | 7.8 | 22.3 | 4.9 | 6.4 |
| Forsa | 2–6 Sep 2019 | 2,503 | 20 | 27 | 15 | 13 | 8 | 6 | 23 | 8 | 4 |
| Infratest dimap | 3–4 Sep 2019 | 1,514 | – | 27 | 14 | 15 | 7 | 7 | 23 | 7 | 4 |
| Forschungsgruppe Wahlen | 2–4 Sep 2019 | 1,270 | – | 28 | 15 | 13 | 6 | 7 | 24 | 7 | 4 |
| Emnid | 29 Aug–4 Sep 2019 | 1,884 | – | 29 | 16 | 14 | 7 | 8 | 21 | 5 | 8 |
| INSA | 30 Aug–2 Sep 2019 | 2,017 | – | 26 | 14.5 | 15 | 8.5 | 7 | 23.5 | 5.5 | 2.5 |
| Forsa | 26–30 Aug 2019 | 2,501 | 19 | 27 | 15 | 12 | 9 | 7 | 23 | 7 | 4 |
| Emnid | 22–28 Aug 2019 | 1,434 | – | 29 | 15 | 14 | 7 | 7 | 22 | 6 | 7 |
| INSA | 23–26 Aug 2019 | 2,058 | – | 26 | 13 | 15 | 8 | 8 | 24 | 6 | 2 |
| Forsa | 19–23 Aug 2019 | 2,504 | 21 | 26 | 14 | 13 | 9 | 8 | 23 | 7 | 3 |
| Infratest dimap | 20–21 Aug 2019 | 1,063 | – | 26 | 14 | 14 | 7 | 7 | 25 | 7 | 1 |
| Emnid | 15–21 Aug 2019 | 1,555 | – | 27 | 15 | 14 | 8 | 8 | 23 | 5 | 4 |
| INSA | 16–19 Aug 2019 | 2,056 | – | 26.5 | 13 | 14.5 | 9 | 8 | 24.5 | 4.5 | 2 |
| Forsa | 12–16 Aug 2019 | 2,501 | 23 | 25 | 13 | 13 | 9 | 8 | 24 | 8 | 1 |
| Allensbach | 2–15 Aug 2019 | 1,262 | – | 29.5 | 13.5 | 12.5 | 7 | 8 | 24 | 5.5 | 5.5 |
| Emnid | 8–14 Aug 2019 | 1,897 | – | 27 | 14 | 14 | 8 | 9 | 22 | 6 | 5 |
| INSA | 9–11 Aug 2019 | 2,060 | – | 27.5 | 12 | 14.5 | 9 | 8 | 23.5 | 5.5 | 4 |
| Forsa | 5–9 Aug 2019 | 2,503 | 22 | 26 | 12 | 13 | 8 | 8 | 25 | 8 | 1 |
| Forschungsgruppe Wahlen | 6–8 Aug 2019 | 1,307 | – | 28 | 13 | 13 | 7 | 7 | 25 | 7 | 3 |
| Emnid | 1–7 Aug 2019 | 2,388 | – | 26 | 14 | 14 | 9 | 9 | 22 | 6 | 4 |
| INSA | 2–5 Aug 2019 | 2,049 | – | 27.5 | 11.5 | 15 | 9 | 9 | 23.5 | 4.5 | 4 |
| Forsa | 29 Jul–2 Aug 2019 | 2,501 | 22 | 27 | 13 | 13 | 9 | 8 | 23 | 7 | 4 |
| Infratest dimap | 29–31 Jul 2019 | 1,503 | – | 26 | 12 | 14 | 8 | 7 | 26 | 7 | Tie |
| Emnid | 25–31 Jul 2019 | 1,419 | – | 26 | 13 | 14 | 9 | 8 | 23 | 7 | 3 |
| YouGov | 26–29 Jul 2019 | 1,594 | – | 26 | 13 | 14 | 8 | 8 | 24 | 7 | 2 |
| INSA | 26–29 Jul 2019 | 2,036 | – | 27 | 12.5 | 14.5 | 9 | 8 | 24.5 | 4.5 | 2.5 |
| Forsa | 22–26 Jul 2019 | 2,502 | 20 | 27 | 13 | 13 | 9 | 7 | 24 | 7 | 3 |
| Infratest dimap | 22–24 Jul 2019 | 1,046 | – | 26 | 13 | 12 | 9 | 8 | 26 | 6 | Tie |
| Emnid | 18–24 Jul 2019 | 1,520 | – | 26 | 14 | 13 | 9 | 8 | 23 | 7 | 3 |
| INSA | 19–22 Jul 2019 | 2,081 | – | 28.5 | 12.5 | 14.5 | 8 | 8 | 22.5 | 6 | 6 |
| GMS | 17–22 Jul 2019 | 1,002 | – | 28 | 13 | 12 | 8 | 8 | 25 | 6 | 3 |
| Forsa | 15–19 Jul 2019 | 2,500 | 20 | 27 | 13 | 12 | 8 | 8 | 24 | 8 | 3 |
| Forschungsgruppe Wahlen | 16–18 Jul 2019 | 1,290 | – | 28 | 13 | 12 | 8 | 8 | 25 | 6 | 3 |
| Emnid | 11–17 Jul 2019 | 1,908 | – | 27 | 14 | 13 | 9 | 9 | 22 | 6 | 5 |
| INSA | 12–15 Jul 2019 | 2,043 | – | 26 | 14 | 14 | 9 | 9 | 23 | 5 | 3 |
| Forsa | 8–12 Jul 2019 | 2,500 | 19 | 26 | 13 | 13 | 7 | 8 | 25 | 8 | 1 |
| Allensbach | 1–11 Jul 2019 | 1,228 | – | 29.5 | 14.5 | 11.5 | 7 | 8.5 | 23 | 6 | 6.5 |
| Emnid | 4–10 Jul 2019 | 2,377 | – | 26 | 15 | 13 | 8 | 9 | 24 | 5 | 2 |
| INSA | 5–8 Jul 2019 | 2,069 | – | 27 | 13.5 | 14 | 8 | 8.5 | 24 | 5 | 3 |
| Forsa | 1–5 Jul 2019 | 2,501 | 19 | 26 | 12 | 12 | 8 | 8 | 26 | 8 | Tie |
| Infratest dimap | 1–3 Jul 2019 | 1,506 | – | 25 | 13 | 13 | 8 | 8 | 26 | 7 | 1 |
| Emnid | 27 Jun–3 Jul 2019 | 2,389 | – | 26 | 13 | 14 | 7 | 9 | 24 | 7 | 2 |
| YouGov | 28 Jun–2 Jul 2019 | 1,644 | – | 26 | 13 | 13 | 7 | 8 | 25 | 8 | 1 |
| INSA | 28 Jun–1 Jul 2019 | 2,053 | – | 27 | 13 | 14 | 8 | 8 | 24 | 6 | 3 |
| Forsa | 24–28 Jun 2019 | 2,501 | 19 | 26 | 12 | 12 | 8 | 8 | 26 | 8 | Tie |
| Infratest dimap | 24–26 Jun 2019 | 1,051 | – | 26 | 13 | 12 | 9 | 7 | 25 | 8 | 1 |
| Emnid | 21–26 Jun 2019 | 1,906 | – | 26 | 13 | 14 | 8 | 8 | 25 | 6 | 1 |
| INSA | 21–24 Jun 2019 | 2,078 | – | 25.5 | 12.5 | 13.5 | 8.5 | 9 | 25.5 | 5.5 | Tie |
| GMS | 18–24 Jun 2019 | 1,004 | – | 26 | 13 | 13 | 8 | 8 | 26 | 6 | Tie |
| Forsa | 17–21 Jun 2019 | 2,500 | 18 | 24 | 12 | 13 | 8 | 8 | 27 | 8 | 3 |
| Forschungsgruppe Wahlen | 17–19 Jun 2019 | 1,291 | – | 27 | 14 | 13 | 7 | 7 | 26 | 6 | 1 |
| Emnid | 13–18 Jun 2019 | 1,910 | – | 27 | 12 | 14 | 7 | 8 | 25 | 7 | 2 |
| INSA | 14–17 Jun 2019 | 2,060 | – | 25 | 13 | 13.5 | 9 | 9 | 25 | 5.5 | Tie |
| Forsa | 11–14 Jun 2019 | 2,001 | 18 | 24 | 11 | 13 | 9 | 8 | 27 | 8 | 3 |
| Emnid | 6–12 Jun 2019 | 2,377 | – | 25 | 12 | 13 | 8 | 8 | 27 | 7 | 2 |
| Allensbach | 1–12 Jun 2019 | 1,273 | – | 29 | 12 | 12 | 8 | 8 | 25 | 6 | 4 |
| Civey | 4–11 Jun 2019 | 10,008 | – | 28.3 | 13.9 | 10.7 | 9.2 | 7.6 | 23.8 | 6.5 | 4.5 |
| INSA | 7–10 Jun 2019 | 2,074 | – | 24 | 13 | 13.5 | 9 | 7.5 | 26.5 | 6.5 | 2.5 |
| Forsa | 3–7 Jun 2019 | 2,501 | 18 | 24 | 12 | 12 | 8 | 8 | 27 | 9 | 3 |
| Forschungsgruppe Wahlen | 3–5 Jun 2019 | 1,297 | – | 27 | 13 | 13 | 7 | 7 | 26 | 7 | 1 |
| Infratest dimap | 3–5 Jun 2019 | 1,500 | – | 25 | 12 | 13 | 8 | 7 | 26 | 9 | 1 |
| Emnid | 29 May–5 Jun 2019 | 1,903 | – | 27 | 12 | 12 | 8 | 7 | 27 | 7 | Tie |
| INSA | 3 Jun 2019 | 1,000 | – | 26 | 14 | 13 | 8 | 8 | 25 | 6 | 1 |
| Forsa | 27–31 May 2019 | 2,001 | 17 | 26 | 12 | 11 | 8 | 7 | 27 | 9 | 1 |
| Emnid | 23–28 May 2019 | 1,413 | – | 28 | 16 | 13 | 8 | 8 | 20 | 7 | 8 |
| INSA | 24–27 May 2019 | 2,039 | – | 27.5 | 15.5 | 13.5 | 9.5 | 9 | 19 | 6 | 8.5 |
| Forsa | 20–24 May 2019 | 2,500 | 24 | 28 | 17 | 13 | 8 | 8 | 18 | 8 | 10 |
| Emnid | 16–22 May 2019 | 1,895 | – | 29 | 17 | 13 | 9 | 9 | 17 | 6 | 12 |
| YouGov | 17–21 May 2019 | 1,609 | – | 29 | 18 | 12 | 8 | 9 | 18 | 6 | 11 |
| INSA | 17–20 May 2019 | 2,074 | – | 28 | 15.5 | 14 | 10 | 9 | 18.5 | 5 | 9.5 |
| Forsa | 13–17 May 2019 | 2,503 | 22 | 29 | 16 | 13 | 8 | 9 | 19 | 6 | 10 |
| Allensbach | 3–16 May 2019 | 1,283 | – | 30 | 17.5 | 13 | 9 | 8.5 | 17 | 5 | 12.5 |
| Emnid | 9–15 May 2019 | 1,975 | – | 29 | 16 | 13 | 9 | 9 | 18 | 6 | 11 |
| INSA | 10–13 May 2019 | 2,044 | – | 28.5 | 16 | 14 | 9.5 | 9 | 19 | 4 | 9.5 |
| Forsa | 6–10 May 2019 | 2,502 | 23 | 30 | 15 | 13 | 8 | 8 | 20 | 6 | 10 |
| Forschungsgruppe Wahlen | 7–9 May 2019 | 1,357 | – | 30 | 16 | 14 | 7 | 8 | 20 | 5 | 10 |
| Emnid | 2–8 May 2019 | 2,393 | – | 29 | 16 | 13 | 9 | 9 | 19 | 5 | 10 |
| GMS | 2–8 May 2019 | 1,006 | – | 29 | 17 | 13 | 8 | 9 | 19 | 5 | 10 |
| INSA | 3–6 May 2019 | 2,089 | – | 28.5 | 16 | 14 | 9 | 8.5 | 20 | 4 | 8.5 |
| Forsa | 29 Apr–3 May 2019 | 2,002 | 23 | 29 | 15 | 13 | 8 | 9 | 20 | 6 | 9 |
| Infratest dimap | 29–30 Apr 2019 | 1,505 | – | 28 | 18 | 12 | 8 | 9 | 20 | 5 | 8 |
| Emnid | 25–30 Apr 2019 | 1,903 | – | 28 | 17 | 13 | 9 | 9 | 19 | 5 | 9 |
| INSA | 26–29 Apr 2019 | 2,005 | – | 28 | 16 | 14 | 10 | 9 | 19 | 4 | 9 |
| YouGov | 26–29 Apr 2019 | 1,642 | – | 29 | 18 | 13 | 9 | 9 | 17 | 5 | 11 |
| Civey | 22–29 Apr 2019 | 10,076 | – | 29.1 | 16.4 | 13.3 | 9.3 | 8.7 | 18.2 | 5.0 | 10.9 |
| Forsa | 23–26 Apr 2019 | 2,001 | 23 | 27 | 17 | 13 | 8 | 9 | 20 | 6 | 7 |
| Emnid | 18–24 Apr 2019 | 1,433 | – | 28 | 17 | 13 | 9 | 10 | 18 | 5 | 10 |
| INSA | 18–21 Apr 2019 | 1,005 | – | 30 | 16 | 14 | 10 | 10 | 17 | 3 | 13 |
| Forsa | 15–18 Apr 2019 | 2,004 | 23 | 28 | 17 | 13 | 9 | 8 | 19 | 6 | 9 |
| Emnid | 11–17 Apr 2019 | 2,709 | – | 28 | 18 | 13 | 8 | 9 | 19 | 5 | 9 |
| Infratest dimap | 15–16 Apr 2019 | 1,051 | – | 29 | 16 | 13 | 8 | 8 | 21 | 5 | 8 |
| INSA | 12–15 Apr 2019 | 2,013 | – | 30.5 | 15.5 | 14 | 9 | 9 | 18 | 4 | 12.5 |
| Forsa | 8–12 Apr 2019 | 2,501 | 24 | 29 | 16 | 12 | 10 | 8 | 19 | 6 | 10 |
| Allensbach | 1–12 Apr 2019 | 1,305 | – | 30 | 18.5 | 12.5 | 9 | 8 | 18 | 4 | 11.5 |
| Forschungsgruppe Wahlen | 9–11 Apr 2019 | 1,282 | – | 28 | 17 | 13 | 8 | 9 | 20 | 5 | 8 |
| Emnid | 4–10 Apr 2019 | 2,559 | – | 30 | 17 | 12 | 9 | 9 | 17 | 6 | 13 |
| INSA | 5–8 Apr 2019 | 2,040 | – | 29 | 15.5 | 14 | 10 | 8.5 | 19 | 4 | 10 |
| Forsa | 1–5 Apr 2019 | 2,501 | 26 | 29 | 16 | 12 | 10 | 8 | 20 | 5 | 9 |
| Infratest dimap | 1–3 Apr 2019 | 1,503 | – | 29 | 17 | 12 | 9 | 8 | 20 | 5 | 9 |
| Emnid | 28 Mar–3 Apr 2019 | 2,335 | – | 31 | 17 | 12 | 8 | 9 | 18 | 5 | 13 |
| GMS | 28 Mar–3 Apr 2019 | 1,003 | – | 30 | 15 | 13 | 10 | 9 | 18 | 5 | 12 |
| INSA | 28 Mar–1 Apr 2019 | 4,000 | – | 29.5 | 16.5 | 13.5 | 10 | 8.5 | 17.5 | 4.5 | 12 |
| Forsa | 25–29 Mar 2019 | 2,504 | 27 | 28 | 16 | 12 | 10 | 8 | 20 | 6 | 8 |
| Forschungsgruppe Wahlen | 25–27 Mar 2019 | 1,325 | – | 30 | 15 | 13 | 9 | 9 | 19 | 5 | 11 |
| Emnid | 21–27 Mar 2019 | 2,361 | – | 30 | 16 | 13 | 9 | 9 | 17 | 6 | 13 |
| YouGov | 22–26 Mar 2019 | 1,633 | – | 30 | 18 | 12 | 9 | 9 | 17 | 5 | 12 |
| INSA | 22–25 Mar 2019 | 2,012 | – | 30.5 | 15.5 | 13.5 | 9 | 9 | 17.5 | 5 | 13 |
| Forsa | 18–22 Mar 2019 | 2,501 | 25 | 30 | 16 | 11 | 9 | 8 | 20 | 6 | 10 |
| Allensbach | 7–21 Mar 2019 | 1,198 | – | 30 | 18 | 12 | 8.5 | 8.5 | 19 | 4 | 11 |
| Infratest dimap | 19–20 Mar 2019 | 1,041 | – | 29 | 18 | 12 | 9 | 8 | 19 | 5 | 10 |
| Emnid | 14–20 Mar 2019 | 1,518 | – | 31 | 17 | 14 | 8 | 8 | 17 | 5 | 14 |
| INSA | 15–18 Mar 2019 | 2,030 | – | 29.5 | 16 | 14.5 | 9 | 9 | 17.5 | 4.5 | 12 |
| Forsa | 11–15 Mar 2019 | 2,505 | 24 | 31 | 15 | 12 | 10 | 7 | 19 | 6 | 12 |
| Forschungsgruppe Wahlen | 12–14 Mar 2019 | 1,290 | – | 31 | 16 | 12 | 8 | 8 | 19 | 6 | 12 |
| Infratest dimap | 11–13 Mar 2019 | 1,508 | – | 29 | 17 | 13 | 8 | 9 | 19 | 5 | 10 |
| Emnid | 7–13 Mar 2019 | 1,904 | – | 31 | 16 | 13 | 8 | 9 | 17 | 6 | 14 |
| INSA | 8–11 Mar 2019 | 2,005 | – | 30.5 | 15 | 14.5 | 10 | 9 | 17.5 | 3.5 | 13 |
| Forsa | 4–8 Mar 2019 | 2,501 | 24 | 31 | 15 | 12 | 9 | 8 | 19 | 6 | 12 |
| Emnid | 28 Feb–6 Mar 2019 | 1,906 | – | 31 | 17 | 14 | 8 | 9 | 16 | 5 | 14 |
| INSA | 27 Feb–1 Mar 2019 | 4,000 | – | 29 | 17 | 14.5 | 10 | 10 | 15.5 | 4 | 12 |
| Forsa | 25 Feb–1 Mar 2019 | 2,502 | ? | 30 | 16 | 11 | 9 | 8 | 20 | 6 | 10 |
| Emnid | 21–27 Feb 2019 | 1,420 | – | 29 | 18 | 14 | 8 | 10 | 16 | 5 | 11 |
| GMS | 21–27 Feb 2019 | 1,005 | – | 31 | 16 | 14 | 9 | 9 | 18 | 3 | 13 |
| YouGov | 22–26 Feb 2019 | 1,620 | – | 30 | 18 | 13 | 9 | 9 | 17 | 4 | 12 |
| INSA | 22–25 Feb 2019 | 2,048 | – | 29.5 | 18 | 14 | 9.5 | 9 | 15.5 | 4.5 | 11.5 |
| Forsa | 18–22 Feb 2019 | 2,501 | 26 | 30 | 16 | 12 | 9 | 7 | 20 | 6 | 10 |
| Forschungsgruppe Wahlen | 19–21 Feb 2019 | 1,226 | – | 31 | 15 | 13 | 7 | 9 | 20 | 5 | 11 |
| Infratest dimap | 19–20 Feb 2019 | 1,029 | – | 30 | 18 | 12 | 8 | 8 | 18 | 6 | 12 |
| Emnid | 14–20 Feb 2019 | 1,511 | – | 29 | 19 | 13 | 9 | 9 | 16 | 5 | 10 |
| INSA | 15–18 Feb 2019 | 2,046 | – | 30 | 18 | 14 | 9 | 9.5 | 15 | 4.5 | 12 |
| Forsa | 11–15 Feb 2019 | 2,501 | 25 | 29 | 17 | 12 | 10 | 6 | 21 | 5 | 8 |
| Infratest dimap | 11–13 Feb 2019 | 1,503 | – | 29 | 17 | 13 | 9 | 8 | 19 | 5 | 10 |
| Emnid | 7–13 Feb 2019 | 1,891 | – | 30 | 19 | 13 | 8 | 10 | 15 | 5 | 11 |
| Allensbach | 1–13 Feb 2019 | 1,222 | – | 30 | 18 | 13.5 | 8 | 8 | 18.5 | 4 | 12 |
| INSA | 8–11 Feb 2019 | 2,051 | – | 29.5 | 15.5 | 14 | 8.5 | 10.5 | 18.5 | 3.5 | 11 |
| Forsa | 4–8 Feb 2019 | 2,500 | 24 | 31 | 15 | 12 | 10 | 8 | 19 | 5 | 12 |
| Forschungsgruppe Wahlen | 5–7 Feb 2019 | 1,350 | – | 30 | 16 | 12 | 8 | 9 | 20 | 5 | 10 |
| Emnid | 31 Jan–6 Feb 2019 | 1,900 | – | 30 | 17 | 13 | 9 | 9 | 17 | 5 | 13 |
| INSA | 1–4 Feb 2019 | 2,034 | – | 30 | 14.5 | 14 | 8.5 | 10.5 | 18.5 | 4 | 11.5 |
| Forsa | 28 Jan–1 Feb 2019 | 2,501 | 25 | 32 | 15 | 12 | 9 | 8 | 19 | 5 | 13 |
| Emnid | 24–30 Jan 2019 | 1,434 | – | 29 | 16 | 15 | 10 | 8 | 18 | 4 | 11 |
| YouGov | 25–29 Jan 2019 | 1,578 | – | 32 | 15 | 14 | 8 | 9 | 18 | 4 | 14 |
| INSA | 25–28 Jan 2019 | 2,056 | – | 30 | 15 | 14 | 9 | 10 | 18 | 4 | 12 |
| Forsa | 21–25 Jan 2019 | 2,501 | 24 | 32 | 14 | 11 | 9 | 9 | 20 | 5 | 12 |
| Forschungsgruppe Wahlen | 22–24 Jan 2019 | 1,285 | – | 31 | 14 | 13 | 8 | 9 | 20 | 5 | 11 |
| Infratest dimap | 22–23 Jan 2019 | 1,051 | – | 28 | 15 | 15 | 9 | 8 | 20 | 5 | 8 |
| Emnid | 17–23 Jan 2019 | 2,017 | – | 29 | 16 | 14 | 9 | 9 | 19 | 4 | 10 |
| GMS | 16–23 Jan 2019 | 1,003 | – | 31 | 14 | 13 | 10 | 9 | 19 | 4 | 12 |
| INSA | 18–21 Jan 2019 | 2,044 | – | 31 | 13.5 | 13 | 9.5 | 9.5 | 19.5 | 4 | 11.5 |
| Forsa | 14–18 Jan 2019 | 2,503 | 24 | 32 | 15 | 12 | 9 | 8 | 19 | 5 | 13 |
| Allensbach | 5–17 Jan 2019 | 1,249 | – | 31.5 | 16.5 | 13 | 8.5 | 8.5 | 18 | 4 | 13.5 |
| Emnid | 10–16 Jan 2019 | 1,448 | – | 30 | 15 | 14 | 8 | 9 | 18 | 6 | 12 |
| INSA | 11–14 Jan 2019 | 2,028 | – | 29 | 14.5 | 14.5 | 9.5 | 10.5 | 18 | 4 | 11 |
| Forsa | 7–11 Jan 2019 | 2,504 | 25 | 32 | 15 | 12 | 9 | 8 | 19 | 5 | 13 |
| Forschungsgruppe Wahlen | 8–10 Jan 2019 | 1,267 | – | 29 | 14 | 14 | 8 | 9 | 21 | 5 | 8 |
| Infratest dimap | 7–9 Jan 2019 | 1,505 | – | 29 | 15 | 14 | 9 | 9 | 20 | 4 | 9 |
| Emnid | 3–9 Jan 2019 | 1,964 | – | 31 | 15 | 14 | 8 | 9 | 18 | 5 | 13 |
| Civey | 1–8 Jan 2019 | 11,881 | – | 28.6 | 15.5 | 16.0 | 8.8 | 8.6 | 18.1 | 4.4 | 10.5 |
| INSA | 5–7 Jan 2019 | 2,056 | – | 30 | 15 | 15 | 10 | 10 | 17 | 3 | 13 |
| Forsa | 2–4 Jan 2019 | 1,503 | 24 | 32 | 15 | 12 | 8 | 9 | 19 | 5 | 13 |
| INSA | 2–3 Jan 2019 | 1,026 | – | 29 | 15 | 14 | 10 | 10 | 18 | 4 | 11 |
| 2017 federal election | 24 Sep 2017 | – | 23.8 | 32.9 | 20.5 | 12.6 | 10.7 | 9.2 | 8.9 | 5.0 | 12.4 |

=== 2018 ===
| Polling firm | Fieldwork date | Sample size | Abs. | Union | SPD | AfD | FDP | Linke | Grüne | Others | Lead |
|---|---|---|---|---|---|---|---|---|---|---|---|
| YouGov | 21–27 Dec 2018 | 1,665 | – | 30 | 16 | 14 | 8 | 10 | 18 | 4 | 12 |
| INSA | 20–21 Dec 2018 | 1,029 | – | 29 | 14 | 15 | 9 | 9 | 19 | 5 | 10 |
| Forsa | 17–21 Dec 2018 | 2,504 | 24 | 31 | 14 | 13 | 8 | 8 | 20 | 6 | 11 |
| Emnid | 13–19 Dec 2018 | 1,889 | – | 29 | 15 | 14 | 9 | 9 | 19 | 5 | 10 |
| INSA | 14–17 Dec 2018 | 2,077 | – | 29 | 15 | 15 | 9.5 | 9.5 | 18 | 4 | 11 |
| Forsa | 10–14 Dec 2018 | 2,507 | 24 | 32 | 15 | 12 | 8 | 8 | 19 | 6 | 13 |
| Forschungsgruppe Wahlen | 11–13 Dec 2018 | 1,268 | – | 30 | 15 | 15 | 7 | 9 | 19 | 5 | 11 |
| Infratest dimap | 11–12 Dec 2018 | 1,048 | – | 31 | 15 | 13 | 8 | 8 | 20 | 5 | 11 |
| Emnid | 6–12 Dec 2018 | 1,997 | – | 30 | 15 | 14 | 8 | 8 | 20 | 5 | 10 |
| GMS | 6–12 Dec 2018 | 1,005 | – | 30 | 14 | 15 | 9 | 9 | 19 | 4 | 11 |
| Allensbach | 1–12 Dec 2018 | 1,295 | – | 29 | 16.5 | 14 | 8.5 | 9 | 19 | 4 | 10 |
| INSA | 8–10 Dec 2018 | 2,047 | – | 29 | 15 | 15 | 10 | 10 | 17 | 4 | 12 |
| Forsa | 7–9 Dec 2018 | 1,506 | 22 | 32 | 14 | 13 | 8 | 8 | 19 | 6 | 13 |
| Forsa | 3–6 Dec 2018 | 2,006 | ? | 29 | 14 | 13 | 8 | 8 | 22 | 6 | 7 |
| Infratest dimap | 3–5 Dec 2018 | 1,502 | – | 30 | 14 | 14 | 8 | 8 | 20 | 6 | 10 |
| Emnid | 29 Nov–5 Dec 2018 | 2,469 | – | 29 | 15 | 14 | 9 | 9 | 19 | 5 | 10 |
| INSA | 30 Nov–3 Dec 2018 | 2,069 | – | 27.5 | 13.5 | 16 | 9.5 | 11 | 18 | 4.5 | 9.5 |
| Civey | 24 Nov–3 Dec 2018 | 10,041 | – | 26.5 | 15.0 | 15.9 | 9.5 | 9.4 | 19.9 | 3.8 | 6.6 |
| Forsa | 26–30 Nov 2018 | 2,505 | 24 | 27 | 14 | 14 | 9 | 8 | 22 | 6 | 5 |
| Infratest dimap | 27–28 Nov 2018 | 1,052 | – | 28 | 14 | 15 | 9 | 8 | 21 | 5 | 7 |
| Emnid | 22–28 Nov 2018 | 1,531 | – | 28 | 15 | 15 | 9 | 9 | 19 | 5 | 9 |
| YouGov | 23–27 Nov 2018 | 1,580 | – | 27 | 15 | 14 | 9 | 10 | 21 | 4 | 6 |
| INSA | 23–26 Nov 2018 | 2,062 | – | 27.5 | 14 | 16 | 8.5 | 10 | 19 | 5 | 8.5 |
| Forsa | 19–23 Nov 2018 | 2,507 | 21 | 27 | 14 | 14 | 9 | 8 | 23 | 5 | 4 |
| Forschungsgruppe Wahlen | 20–22 Nov 2018 | 1,336 | – | 27 | 14 | 16 | 8 | 9 | 22 | 4 | 5 |
| Emnid | 15–21 Nov 2018 | 2,361 | – | 26 | 15 | 15 | 9 | 9 | 21 | 5 | 5 |
| INSA | 16–19 Nov 2018 | 2,047 | – | 25.5 | 14.5 | 15.5 | 9.5 | 10 | 20 | 5 | 5.5 |
| Forsa | 12–16 Nov 2018 | 2,503 | 24 | 28 | 14 | 12 | 9 | 9 | 23 | 5 | 5 |
| Allensbach | 2–15 Nov 2018 | 1,242 | – | 28 | 17 | 13.5 | 9.5 | 9 | 19 | 4 | 9 |
| Infratest dimap | 12–14 Nov 2018 | 1,506 | – | 26 | 14 | 14 | 8 | 9 | 23 | 6 | 3 |
| Emnid | 8–14 Nov 2018 | 1,987 | – | 26 | 15 | 15 | 8 | 9 | 21 | 6 | 5 |
| INSA | 9–12 Nov 2018 | 2,070 | – | 25.5 | 14 | 16.5 | 9 | 10 | 20 | 5 | 5.5 |
| Forsa | 5–9 Nov 2018 | 2,504 | 23 | 27 | 14 | 13 | 9 | 9 | 23 | 5 | 4 |
| Forschungsgruppe Wahlen | 6–8 Nov 2018 | 1,200 | – | 27 | 14 | 14 | 9 | 9 | 22 | 5 | 5 |
| Emnid | 5–7 Nov 2018 | 1,518 | – | 25 | 15 | 15 | 8 | 9 | 22 | 6 | 3 |
| INSA | 2–5 Nov 2018 | 3,138 | – | 24.5 | 13.5 | 16.5 | 10 | 11 | 19 | 5.5 | 5.5 |
| Civey | 29 Oct–5 Nov 2018 | 10,005 | – | 28.6 | 15.4 | 13.0 | 9.6 | 9.3 | 19.4 | 4.7 | 9.2 |
| YouGov | 28 Oct–4 Nov 2018 | 1,542 | – | 25 | 14 | 16 | 10 | 10 | 21 | 4 | 4 |
| Forsa | 29 Oct–2 Nov 2018 | 2,502 | 24 | 27 | 13 | 13 | 9 | 9 | 24 | 5 | 3 |
| Emnid | 25–31 Oct 2018 | 1,815 | – | 25 | 14 | 15 | 9 | 10 | 21 | 6 | 4 |
| INSA | 26–29 Oct 2018 | 2,052 | – | 25 | 14 | 16.5 | 9.5 | 11 | 20 | 4 | 5 |
| Forsa | 22–26 Oct 2018 | 2,509 | ? | 26 | 14 | 14 | 9 | 10 | 21 | 6 | 5 |
| Emnid | 18–24 Oct 2018 | 1,905 | – | 24 | 15 | 16 | 10 | 10 | 20 | 5 | 4 |
| INSA | 19–22 Oct 2018 | 2,061 | – | 26 | 15 | 17 | 9 | 10.5 | 19 | 3.5 | 7 |
| Forsa | 15–19 Oct 2018 | 2,502 | 26 | 27 | 14 | 15 | 9 | 9 | 21 | 5 | 6 |
| Forschungsgruppe Wahlen | 16–18 Oct 2018 | 1,117 | – | 27 | 14 | 16 | 8 | 10 | 20 | 5 | 7 |
| Infratest dimap | 16–17 Oct 2018 | 1,040 | – | 25 | 14 | 16 | 11 | 9 | 19 | 6 | 6 |
| Emnid | 11–17 Oct 2018 | 1,609 | – | 25 | 15 | 15 | 10 | 10 | 19 | 6 | 6 |
| INSA | 12–15 Oct 2018 | 2,061 | – | 26.5 | 15 | 18 | 9.5 | 10.5 | 17 | 3.5 | 8.5 |
| Forsa | 8–12 Oct 2018 | 2,504 | 29 | 28 | 16 | 14 | 9 | 9 | 19 | 5 | 9 |
| Allensbach | 28 Sep–11 Oct 2018 | 1,259 | – | 29 | 19 | 15 | 8.5 | 9 | 15 | 4.5 | 10 |
| Infratest dimap | 8–10 Oct 2018 | 1,508 | – | 26 | 15 | 16 | 10 | 10 | 17 | 6 | 9 |
| Emnid | 4–10 Oct 2018 | 1,899 | – | 26 | 17 | 15 | 9 | 11 | 17 | 5 | 9 |
| GMS | 4–10 Oct 2018 | 1,007 | – | 27 | 15 | 18 | 10 | 10 | 16 | 4 | 9 |
| INSA | 5–8 Oct 2018 | 2,054 | – | 26 | 16 | 18 | 10 | 11 | 15 | 4 | 8 |
| Forsa | 1–5 Oct 2018 | 2,002 | 29 | 28 | 16 | 14 | 9 | 10 | 18 | 5 | 10 |
| Emnid | 27 Sep–2 Oct 2018 | 1,515 | – | 27 | 17 | 16 | 9 | 10 | 16 | 5 | 10 |
| INSA | 28 Sep–1 Oct 2018 | 2,041 | – | 26 | 16 | 18.5 | 10 | 11.5 | 14.5 | 3.5 | 7.5 |
| Civey | 24 Sep–1 Oct 2018 | 11,904 | – | 26.7 | 16.8 | 16.8 | 8.6 | 10.4 | 15.7 | 5.0 | 9.9 |
| Forsa | 24–28 Sep 2018 | 2,501 | 31 | 28 | 16 | 15 | 9 | 10 | 17 | 5 | 11 |
| Forschungsgruppe Wahlen | 25–27 Sep 2018 | 1,260 | – | 28 | 17 | 16 | 8 | 10 | 17 | 4 | 11 |
| Emnid | 20–26 Sep 2018 | 1,902 | – | 27 | 16 | 17 | 10 | 11 | 15 | 4 | 10 |
| GMS | 20–26 Sep 2018 | 1,005 | – | 27 | 16 | 18 | 9 | 10 | 15 | 5 | 9 |
| YouGov | 21–25 Sep 2018 | 1,504 | – | 27 | 17 | 18 | 9 | 11 | 14 | 4 | 9 |
| INSA | 21–24 Sep 2018 | 2,051 | – | 27 | 16 | 18 | 10 | 11.5 | 14.5 | 3 | 9 |
| Forsa | 17–21 Sep 2018 | 2,502 | 31 | 28 | 17 | 15 | 9 | 10 | 16 | 5 | 11 |
| INSA | 19 Sep 2018 | 1,040 | – | 27.5 | 16.5 | 17.5 | 10 | 11 | 14.5 | 3 | 10 |
| Infratest dimap | 17–19 Sep 2018 | 1,035 | – | 28 | 17 | 18 | 9 | 10 | 15 | 3 | 10 |
| Emnid | 13–19 Sep 2018 | 2,368 | – | 28 | 17 | 16 | 9 | 11 | 14 | 5 | 11 |
| INSA | 14–17 Sep 2018 | 2,054 | – | 28.5 | 17 | 17.5 | 9 | 10.5 | 13 | 4.5 | 11 |
| Forsa | 10–14 Sep 2018 | 2,507 | 25 | 30 | 18 | 13 | 8 | 10 | 16 | 5 | 12 |
| Forschungsgruppe Wahlen | 11–13 Sep 2018 | 1,339 | – | 30 | 20 | 15 | 7 | 8 | 16 | 4 | 10 |
| Allensbach | 1–13 Sep 2018 | 1,258 | – | 31.5 | 19.5 | 15 | 8.5 | 9 | 12.5 | 4 | 12 |
| Emnid | 6–12 Sep 2018 | 1,978 | – | 30 | 18 | 15 | 9 | 10 | 13 | 5 | 12 |
| INSA | 7–10 Sep 2018 | 2,042 | – | 28 | 17 | 17.5 | 9 | 10.5 | 13.5 | 4.5 | 10.5 |
| GMS | 4–10 Sep 2018 | 1,003 | – | 29 | 17 | 16 | 9 | 9 | 14 | 6 | 12 |
| Forsa | 3–7 Sep 2018 | 2,507 | 27 | 31 | 16 | 14 | 9 | 10 | 15 | 5 | 15 |
| Infratest dimap | 3–5 Sep 2018 | 1,502 | – | 29 | 18 | 16 | 8 | 10 | 14 | 5 | 11 |
| Emnid | 30 Aug–5 Sep 2018 | 2,472 | – | 29 | 17 | 15 | 9 | 10 | 14 | 6 | 12 |
| INSA | 31 Aug–3 Sep 2018 | 2,069 | – | 28.5 | 16 | 17 | 9.5 | 10 | 13.5 | 5.5 | 11.5 |
| Forsa | 27–31 Aug 2018 | 2,503 | 26 | 30 | 17 | 16 | 8 | 8 | 16 | 5 | 13 |
| Forschungsgruppe Wahlen | 28–30 Aug 2018 | 1,216 | – | 31 | 18 | 17 | 8 | 8 | 14 | 4 | 13 |
| Emnid | 23–29 Aug 2018 | 2,390 | – | 30 | 19 | 15 | 9 | 9 | 14 | 4 | 11 |
| YouGov | 24–28 Aug 2018 | 1,538 | – | 28 | 17 | 17 | 9 | 11 | 13 | 5 | 11 |
| INSA | 24–27 Aug 2018 | 2,079 | – | 28 | 16.5 | 16.5 | 10 | 10.5 | 13.5 | 5 | 11.5 |
| Forsa | 20–24 Aug 2018 | 2,502 | 26 | 30 | 18 | 14 | 8 | 10 | 15 | 5 | 12 |
| Infratest dimap | 20–22 Aug 2018 | 1,047 | – | 29 | 18 | 17 | 8 | 9 | 14 | 5 | 11 |
| Emnid | 16–22 Aug 2018 | 1,891 | – | 30 | 18 | 14 | 9 | 9 | 15 | 5 | 12 |
| INSA | 16–20 Aug 2018 | 3,129 | – | 28 | 16.5 | 16 | 10 | 12 | 13.5 | 4 | 11.5 |
| Forsa | 13–17 Aug 2018 | 2,503 | 26 | 30 | 18 | 14 | 9 | 10 | 15 | 4 | 12 |
| Emnid | 9–15 Aug 2018 | 2,942 | – | 30 | 17 | 15 | 9 | 9 | 15 | 5 | 13 |
| INSA | 10–13 Aug 2018 | 2,034 | – | 29 | 17.5 | 17 | 9.5 | 11 | 12.5 | 3.5 | 11.5 |
| Forsa | 6–10 Aug 2018 | 2,505 | 26 | 30 | 18 | 14 | 10 | 9 | 15 | 4 | 12 |
| Forschungsgruppe Wahlen | 7–9 Aug 2018 | 1,294 | – | 31 | 18 | 16 | 8 | 9 | 15 | 3 | 13 |
| Allensbach | 27 Jul–9 Aug 2018 | 1,295 | – | 31 | 20 | 14.5 | 9 | 9 | 12.5 | 4 | 11 |
| Emnid | 2–8 Aug 2018 | 2,502 | – | 31 | 17 | 14 | 8 | 10 | 15 | 5 | 14 |
| Civey | 31 Jul–7 Aug 2018 | 11,907 | – | 30.1 | 17.4 | 15.8 | 7.8 | 9.8 | 14.0 | 5.1 | 12.7 |
| INSA | 3–6 Aug 2018 | 2,096 | – | 30 | 17 | 17 | 8.5 | 11 | 12.5 | 4 | 13 |
| Forsa | 30 Jul–3 Aug 2018 | 2,508 | 26 | 31 | 18 | 14 | 10 | 9 | 13 | 5 | 13 |
| Infratest dimap | 30 Jul–1 Aug 2018 | 1,508 | – | 29 | 18 | 17 | 7 | 9 | 15 | 5 | 11 |
| Emnid | 26 Jul–1 Aug 2018 | 2,478 | – | 30 | 18 | 15 | 8 | 9 | 15 | 5 | 12 |
| GMS | 25–31 Jul 2018 | 1,005 | – | 30 | 17 | 16 | 10 | 10 | 13 | 4 | 13 |
| INSA | 27–30 Jul 2018 | 2,074 | – | 29 | 18 | 17.5 | 9 | 10.5 | 12 | 4 | 11 |
| Forsa | 23–27 Jul 2018 | 2,505 | 25 | 32 | 18 | 14 | 9 | 9 | 13 | 5 | 14 |
| Infratest dimap | 24–25 Jul 2018 | 1,047 | – | 30 | 18 | 16 | 8 | 8 | 15 | 5 | 12 |
| Emnid | 19–25 Jul 2018 | 2,001 | – | 29 | 18 | 15 | 9 | 10 | 14 | 5 | 11 |
| YouGov | 20–24 Jul 2018 | 1,520 | – | 30 | 17 | 17 | 9 | 11 | 12 | 4 | 13 |
| INSA | 20–23 Jul 2018 | 2,056 | – | 29 | 18 | 17.5 | 9 | 10.5 | 12 | 4 | 11 |
| Forsa | 16–20 Jul 2018 | 2,505 | 25 | 31 | 18 | 15 | 8 | 10 | 13 | 5 | 13 |
| Emnid | 12–18 Jul 2018 | 2,476 | – | 30 | 19 | 15 | 9 | 10 | 12 | 5 | 11 |
| INSA | 13–16 Jul 2018 | 2,084 | – | 29 | 17 | 17.5 | 9.5 | 10 | 13 | 4 | 11.5 |
| Forsa | 9–13 Jul 2018 | 2,505 | 24 | 31 | 17 | 16 | 9 | 9 | 13 | 5 | 14 |
| Forschungsgruppe Wahlen | 9–12 Jul 2018 | 1,340 | – | 31 | 18 | 15 | 7 | 11 | 14 | 4 | 13 |
| Emnid | 5–11 Jul 2018 | 2,368 | – | 30 | 18 | 16 | 9 | 10 | 12 | 5 | 12 |
| Allensbach | 1–12 Jul 2018 | 1,295 | – | 30.5 | 20 | 15 | 9.5 | 9 | 12 | 4 | 10.5 |
| GMS | 5–11 Jul 2018 | 1,006 | – | 30 | 17 | 17 | 9 | 10 | 12 | 5 | 13 |
| INSA | 6–9 Jul 2018 | 2,061 | – | 29 | 17 | 17.5 | 9.5 | 11 | 12 | 4 | 11.5 |
| Forsa | 2–6 Jul 2018 | 2,502 | 24 | 30 | 17 | 16 | 10 | 9 | 13 | 5 | 13 |
| Infratest dimap | 3–4 Jul 2018 | 1,505 | – | 30 | 18 | 16 | 8 | 9 | 14 | 5 | 12 |
| Emnid | 28 Jun–4 Jul 2018 | 1,894 | – | 30 | 17 | 17 | 9 | 9 | 12 | 6 | 13 |
| INSA | 29 Jun–2 Jul 2018 | 2,089 | – | 29 | 19 | 16.5 | 9 | 11 | 12 | 3.5 | 10 |
| Forsa | 25–29 Jun 2018 | 2,508 | 24 | 31 | 17 | 15 | 10 | 10 | 12 | 5 | 14 |
| Forschungsgruppe Wahlen | 25–28 Jun 2018 | 1,290 | – | 32 | 18 | 14 | 9 | 10 | 14 | 3 | 14 |
| Emnid | 21–28 Jun 2018 | 1,954 | – | 32 | 19 | 14 | 9 | 9 | 12 | 5 | 13 |
| Infratest dimap | 25–26 Jun 2018 | 1,025 | – | 32 | 19 | 14 | 8 | 9 | 13 | 5 | 13 |
| YouGov | 22–26 Jun 2018 | 1,525 | – | 30 | 17 | 16 | 10 | 11 | 12 | 4 | 13 |
| Civey | 19–26 Jun 2018 | 10,033 | – | 29.8 | 17.7 | 16.1 | 8.7 | 10.1 | 12.7 | 4.9 | 12.1 |
| INSA | 22–25 Jun 2018 | 2,036 | – | 29 | 19.5 | 16 | 9 | 11 | 11 | 4.5 | 9.5 |
| Forsa | 18–22 Jun 2018 | 2,503 | 24 | 30 | 17 | 15 | 9 | 10 | 13 | 6 | 13 |
| Emnid | 14–20 Jun 2018 | 2,336 | – | 31 | 18 | 16 | 9 | 10 | 12 | 4 | 13 |
| INSA | 15–18 Jun 2018 | 2,060 | – | 29 | 19 | 16 | 8 | 12 | 11 | 5 | 10 |
| Forsa | 14–15 Jun 2018 | 1,001 | 26 | 30 | 16 | 15 | 10 | 9 | 14 | 6 | 14 |
| Forsa | 11–13 Jun 2018 | 1,501 | 23 | 34 | 18 | 13 | 9 | 8 | 12 | 6 | 16 |
| Infratest dimap | 11–13 Jun 2018 | 1,506 | – | 31 | 18 | 15 | 8 | 10 | 13 | 5 | 13 |
| Emnid | 7–13 Jun 2018 | 2,310 | – | 33 | 18 | 15 | 8 | 11 | 11 | 4 | 15 |
| Allensbach | 1–13 Jun 2018 | 1,279 | – | 33 | 21 | 13 | 9.5 | 9.5 | 11 | 3 | 12 |
| INSA | 8–11 Jun 2018 | 2,038 | – | 31 | 17 | 16 | 8 | 12 | 11 | 5 | 14 |
| Forsa | 4–8 Jun 2018 | 2,504 | 23 | 33 | 18 | 13 | 9 | 10 | 12 | 5 | 15 |
| Forschungsgruppe Wahlen | 5–7 Jun 2018 | 1,284 | – | 33 | 20 | 13 | 8 | 10 | 13 | 3 | 13 |
| Emnid | 30 May–6 Jun 2018 | 1,950 | – | 32 | 19 | 14 | 8 | 11 | 12 | 4 | 13 |
| INSA | 1–4 Jun 2018 | 2,067 | – | 32 | 17 | 16 | 8 | 11.5 | 11 | 4.5 | 15 |
| Forsa | 28 May–1 Jun 2018 | 2,506 | 25 | 34 | 18 | 13 | 8 | 10 | 12 | 5 | 16 |
| YouGov | 25–29 May 2018 | 1,556 | – | 33 | 17 | 16 | 9 | 11 | 11 | 3 | 16 |
| Emnid | 24–29 May 2018 | 1,397 | – | 32 | 18 | 15 | 7 | 11 | 13 | 4 | 14 |
| Civey | 22–29 May 2018 | 11,925 | – | 32.2 | 16.6 | 15.2 | 9.2 | 10.2 | 12.0 | 4.6 | 15.6 |
| INSA | 25–28 May 2018 | 2,062 | – | 32 | 17 | 15.5 | 8 | 12 | 11.5 | 4 | 15 |
| Forsa | 22–25 May 2018 | 2,002 | 24 | 33 | 18 | 13 | 8 | 10 | 13 | 5 | 15 |
| Emnid | 17–23 May 2018 | 1,946 | – | 33 | 17 | 14 | 8 | 11 | 13 | 4 | 16 |
| INSA | 18–22 May 2018 | 2,044 | – | 32.5 | 16.5 | 15.5 | 8 | 11 | 11.5 | 5 | 16 |
| Forsa | 14–18 May 2018 | 2,502 | 23 | 33 | 18 | 13 | 9 | 9 | 12 | 6 | 15 |
| Forschungsgruppe Wahlen | 15–17 May 2018 | 1,200 | – | 34 | 20 | 14 | 8 | 9 | 12 | 3 | 14 |
| Infratest dimap | 14–16 May 2018 | 1,009 | – | 33 | 17 | 14 | 8 | 10 | 13 | 5 | 16 |
| GMS | 11–16 May 2018 | 1,003 | – | 34 | 16 | 14 | 9 | 10 | 12 | 5 | 18 |
| Emnid | 9–16 May 2018 | 2,030 | – | 33 | 17 | 14 | 9 | 10 | 13 | 4 | 16 |
| INSA | 11–14 May 2018 | 2,098 | – | 32.5 | 17 | 15.5 | 8 | 11 | 11.5 | 4.5 | 15.5 |
| Forsa | 7–11 May 2018 | 2,004 | 23 | 34 | 17 | 13 | 8 | 10 | 13 | 5 | 17 |
| Infratest dimap | 7–8 May 2018 | 1,507 | – | 32 | 18 | 15 | 8 | 9 | 13 | 5 | 14 |
| Emnid | 3–8 May 2018 | 1,489 | – | 33 | 17 | 14 | 9 | 10 | 12 | 5 | 16 |
| Allensbach | 24 Apr–8 May 2018 | 1,253 | – | 34 | 20 | 11.5 | 9 | 10 | 11 | 4.5 | 14 |
| INSA | 4–7 May 2018 | 2,065 | – | 32.5 | 17 | 15.5 | 8.5 | 10.5 | 11.5 | 4.5 | 15.5 |
| Forsa | 30 Apr–4 May 2018 | 2,003 | 21 | 34 | 18 | 13 | 9 | 10 | 11 | 5 | 16 |
| Emnid | 26 Apr–2 May 2018 | 1,507 | – | 34 | 17 | 14 | 8 | 10 | 12 | 5 | 17 |
| INSA | 27–30 Apr 2018 | 2,097 | – | 33 | 17 | 15.5 | 9 | 10.5 | 11.5 | 3.5 | 16 |
| Forsa | 23–27 Apr 2018 | 2,507 | 22 | 34 | 17 | 12 | 9 | 10 | 13 | 5 | 17 |
| Forschungsgruppe Wahlen | 24–26 Apr 2018 | 1,285 | – | 34 | 20 | 13 | 7 | 10 | 13 | 3 | 14 |
| GMS | 20–26 Apr 2018 | 1,005 | – | 33 | 17 | 13 | 9 | 11 | 12 | 5 | 16 |
| Emnid | 19–25 Apr 2018 | 2,350 | – | 32 | 18 | 14 | 9 | 11 | 12 | 4 | 14 |
| YouGov | 20–24 Apr 2018 | 1,573 | – | 32 | 18 | 15 | 9 | 10 | 12 | 4 | 15 |
| INSA | 20–23 Apr 2018 | 2,091 | – | 31.5 | 18 | 15.5 | 9.5 | 10.5 | 12 | 3 | 13.5 |
| Forsa | 16–20 Apr 2018 | 2,503 | 22 | 34 | 18 | 12 | 9 | 10 | 13 | 4 | 16 |
| Infratest dimap | 16–18 Apr 2018 | 1,039 | – | 32 | 17 | 15 | 10 | 10 | 12 | 4 | 15 |
| Emnid | 12–18 Apr 2018 | 2,437 | – | 33 | 18 | 13 | 9 | 11 | 12 | 4 | 15 |
| Allensbach | 3–17 Apr 2018 | 1,279 | – | 34 | 20.5 | 12 | 10 | 9 | 11 | 3.5 | 13.5 |
| INSA | 13–16 Apr 2018 | 2,054 | – | 31.5 | 18.5 | 15 | 9 | 11 | 11.5 | 3.5 | 13 |
| Forsa | 9–13 Apr 2018 | 2,506 | 23 | 34 | 19 | 12 | 9 | 10 | 12 | 4 | 15 |
| Forschungsgruppe Wahlen | 10–12 Apr 2018 | 1,159 | – | 33 | 19 | 13 | 8 | 9 | 14 | 4 | 14 |
| Emnid | 5–11 Apr 2018 | 1,786 | – | 33 | 18 | 14 | 9 | 11 | 11 | 4 | 15 |
| INSA | 6–9 Apr 2018 | 2,048 | – | 31.5 | 17.5 | 15.5 | 9 | 12 | 11.5 | 3 | 14 |
| Forsa | 3–6 Apr 2018 | 2,005 | 23 | 32 | 20 | 13 | 9 | 10 | 11 | 5 | 12 |
| Emnid | 29 Mar–5 Apr 2018 | 1,414 | – | 34 | 17 | 13 | 8 | 11 | 12 | 5 | 17 |
| Infratest dimap | 3–4 Apr 2018 | 1,503 | – | 33 | 18 | 14 | 9 | 10 | 12 | 4 | 15 |
| pollytix | 23 Mar–4 Apr 2018 | 1,386 | – | 30 | 19 | 15 | 10 | 11 | 10 | 5 | 11 |
| INSA | 29–31 Mar 2018 | 1,074 | – | 32 | 18 | 15 | 10 | 12 | 10 | 3 | 14 |
| Forsa | 26–29 Mar 2018 | 2,003 | 23 | 33 | 18 | 13 | 9 | 10 | 12 | 5 | 15 |
| Emnid | 22–28 Mar 2018 | 1,982 | – | 34 | 18 | 12 | 8 | 11 | 12 | 5 | 16 |
| YouGov | 23–27 Mar 2018 | 1,579 | – | 34 | 17 | 15 | 8 | 11 | 11 | 4 | 17 |
| Civey | 20–27 Mar 2018 | 11,868 | – | 31.2 | 17.2 | 15.4 | 9.3 | 10.5 | 11.9 | 4.5 | 14.0 |
| INSA | 23–26 Mar 2018 | 2,051 | – | 32.5 | 17 | 15 | 10 | 12 | 10.5 | 3 | 15.5 |
| Forsa | 19–23 Mar 2018 | 2,502 | 23 | 31 | 19 | 14 | 9 | 11 | 12 | 4 | 12 |
| Infratest dimap | 20–21 Mar 2018 | 1,038 | – | 33 | 19 | 13 | 9 | 10 | 12 | 4 | 14 |
| GMS | 16–21 Mar 2018 | 1,003 | – | 33 | 18 | 13 | 10 | 10 | 11 | 5 | 15 |
| Emnid | 15–21 Mar 2018 | 1,972 | – | 34 | 18 | 13 | 9 | 10 | 12 | 4 | 16 |
| INSA | 16–19 Mar 2018 | 2,066 | – | 32 | 17.5 | 15 | 10 | 12 | 10.5 | 3 | 14.5 |
| Forsa | 12–16 Mar 2018 | 2,502 | 25 | 34 | 19 | 13 | 8 | 10 | 11 | 5 | 15 |
| Forschungsgruppe Wahlen | 13–15 Mar 2018 | 1,214 | – | 32 | 19 | 13 | 9 | 11 | 12 | 4 | 13 |
| Allensbach | 2–15 Mar 2018 | 1,256 | – | 34 | 19 | 12.5 | 10 | 10 | 11 | 3.5 | 15 |
| Emnid | 8–14 Mar 2018 | 1,959 | – | 33 | 19 | 14 | 9 | 10 | 11 | 4 | 14 |
| INSA | 9–12 Mar 2018 | 2,033 | – | 32 | 17.5 | 15 | 9.5 | 12 | 11 | 3 | 14.5 |
| Forsa | 5–9 Mar 2018 | 2,507 | 24 | 34 | 18 | 12 | 9 | 10 | 13 | 4 | 16 |
| Emnid | 1–7 Mar 2018 | 1,869 | – | 33 | 19 | 13 | 8 | 10 | 12 | 5 | 14 |
| INSA | 5 Mar 2018 | 1,052 | – | 33 | 15 | 15 | 10 | 12 | 12 | 3 | 18 |
| Forsa | 4–5 Mar 2018 | 1,502 | 26 | 34 | 19 | 13 | 9 | 9 | 12 | 4 | 15 |
| Forsa | 26 Feb–2 Mar 2018 | 2,505 | 25 | 35 | 18 | 13 | 9 | 9 | 12 | 4 | 17 |
| Infratest dimap | 26–28 Feb 2018 | 1,502 | – | 34 | 18 | 15 | 9 | 9 | 11 | 4 | 16 |
| YouGov | 26–28 Feb 2018 | 1,585 | – | 32 | 16 | 16 | 8 | 12 | 12 | 4 | 16 |
| Emnid | 22–28 Feb 2018 | 1,890 | – | 33 | 16 | 15 | 9 | 11 | 12 | 4 | 17 |
| Civey | 20–27 Feb 2018 | 11,878 | – | 33.7 | 18.1 | 12.1 | 8.1 | 10.4 | 12.6 | 5.0 | 15.6 |
| INSA | 23–26 Feb 2018 | 1,063 | – | 32.5 | 15.5 | 16 | 9 | 12 | 12 | 3 | 16.5 |
| Forsa | 19–23 Feb 2018 | 2,506 | 25 | 35 | 18 | 13 | 9 | 9 | 12 | 4 | 17 |
| Forschungsgruppe Wahlen | 20–22 Feb 2018 | 1,360 | – | 33 | 17 | 14 | 8 | 11 | 12 | 5 | 16 |
| Infratest dimap | 20–21 Feb 2018 | 1,052 | – | 34 | 17 | 14 | 9 | 10 | 12 | 4 | 17 |
| Emnid | 15–21 Feb 2018 | 1,985 | – | 33 | 17 | 15 | 10 | 11 | 11 | 3 | 16 |
| Civey | 13–20 Feb 2018 | 11,909 | – | 32.2 | 16.5 | 14.6 | 9.4 | 10.0 | 12.5 | 4.8 | 15.7 |
| INSA | 16–19 Feb 2018 | 2,040 | – | 32 | 15.5 | 16 | 9 | 11 | 13 | 3.5 | 16 |
| Forsa | 12–16 Feb 2018 | 2,501 | 24 | 34 | 16 | 13 | 9 | 10 | 13 | 5 | 18 |
| Infratest dimap | 13–15 Feb 2018 | 1,001 | – | 33 | 16 | 15 | 9 | 11 | 13 | 3 | 17 |
| Allensbach | 2–15 Feb 2018 | 1,271 | – | 32 | 17.5 | 13 | 11 | 9.5 | 12 | 5 | 14.5 |
| Emnid | 8–14 Feb 2018 | 1,478 | – | 33 | 19 | 14 | 9 | 10 | 11 | 4 | 14 |
| Civey | 9–13 Feb 2018 | 11,841 | – | 33.3 | 16.4 | 13.2 | 9.3 | 10.2 | 12.8 | 4.8 | 16.9 |
| INSA | 9–12 Feb 2018 | 2,608 | – | 29.5 | 16.5 | 15 | 10.5 | 11.5 | 13 | 4 | 13 |
| Forsa | 5–9 Feb 2018 | ? | ? | 31 | 17 | 13 | 10 | 10 | 13 | 5 | 14 |
| Forsa | 7–8 Feb 2018 | 1,003 | – | 31 | 18 | 13 | 10 | 10 | 13 | 5 | 13 |
| Emnid | 1–7 Feb 2018 | 1,226 | – | 34 | 20 | 12 | 9 | 9 | 11 | 5 | 14 |
| GMS | 1–7 Feb 2018 | 1,007 | – | 32 | 18 | 14 | 9 | 9 | 13 | 5 | 14 |
| INSA | 2–5 Feb 2018 | 2,034 | – | 30.5 | 17 | 15 | 10 | 11 | 12.5 | 4 | 13.5 |
| Forsa | 29 Jan–2 Feb 2018 | 2,507 | 24 | 33 | 18 | 13 | 9 | 9 | 13 | 5 | 15 |
| Forschungsgruppe Wahlen | 30 Jan–1 Feb 2018 | 1,302 | – | 31 | 19 | 14 | 7 | 11 | 14 | 4 | 12 |
| Infratest dimap | 29–31 Jan 2018 | 1,502 | – | 33 | 18 | 14 | 10 | 11 | 11 | 3 | 15 |
| Emnid | 25–31 Jan 2018 | 1,247 | – | 33 | 20 | 13 | 9 | 10 | 11 | 4 | 13 |
| INSA | 26–29 Jan 2018 | 2,073 | – | 33.5 | 17.5 | 14 | 9 | 11 | 11 | 4 | 16 |
| Forsa | 22–26 Jan 2018 | 2,505 | 25 | 34 | 18 | 12 | 9 | 10 | 12 | 5 | 16 |
| Infratest dimap | 22–24 Jan 2018 | 1,043 | – | 33 | 19 | 12 | 10 | 10 | 11 | 5 | 14 |
| Emnid | 18–24 Jan 2018 | 1,513 | – | 34 | 20 | 12 | 8 | 10 | 11 | 5 | 14 |
| YouGov | 19–23 Jan 2018 | 1,566 | – | 34 | 19 | 14 | 8 | 11 | 10 | 4 | 15 |
| Forsa | 22 Jan 2018 | 1,282 | – | 34 | 17 | 13 | 8 | 11 | 12 | 5 | 17 |
| INSA | 22 Jan 2018 | 1,169 | – | 31.5 | 18 | 14 | 10 | 11 | 10 | 5.5 | 13.5 |
| Forsa | 15–19 Jan 2018 | 2,501 | 23 | 34 | 18 | 12 | 8 | 10 | 12 | 6 | 16 |
| Forschungsgruppe Wahlen | 16–18 Jan 2018 | 1,332 | – | 33 | 20 | 12 | 8 | 10 | 12 | 5 | 13 |
| Allensbach | 5–18 Jan 2018 | 1,221 | – | 34 | 21 | 12 | 10 | 8.5 | 10.5 | 4 | 13 |
| Forsa | 15–17 Jan 2018 | 1,504 | – | 34 | 18 | 12 | 8 | 10 | 12 | 6 | 16 |
| Emnid | 11–17 Jan 2018 | 1,419 | – | 33 | 21 | 13 | 8 | 10 | 10 | 5 | 12 |
| INSA | 12–15 Jan 2018 | 2,000 | – | 31.5 | 18.5 | 14 | 9.5 | 11.5 | 10 | 5 | 13 |
| Forsa | 8–12 Jan 2018 | 2,501 | 22 | 33 | 20 | 11 | 9 | 9 | 12 | 6 | 13 |
| Emnid | 4–10 Jan 2018 | 1,899 | – | 34 | 21 | 13 | 8 | 9 | 11 | 4 | 13 |
| INSA | 5–8 Jan 2018 | 2,028 | – | 31.5 | 19.5 | 13.5 | 10 | 11 | 10 | 4.5 | 12 |
| Civey | 11 Dec 2017–8 Jan 2018 | 11,880 | – | 31.1 | 19.3 | 14.5 | 9.3 | 9.9 | 11.1 | 4.8 | 11.8 |
| Forsa | 2–5 Jan 2018 | 2,503 | 22 | 34 | 20 | 10 | 9 | 9 | 12 | 6 | 14 |
| Infratest dimap | 2–3 Jan 2018 | 1,506 | – | 33 | 21 | 13 | 9 | 9 | 11 | 4 | 12 |
| Emnid | 21 Dec 2017–3 Jan 2018 | 1,440 | – | 33 | 20 | 12 | 9 | 9 | 12 | 5 | 13 |
| INSA | 29 Dec 2017–2 Jan 2018 | 2,012 | – | 32.5 | 19.5 | 13 | 10 | 11 | 10 | 4 | 13 |
| GMS | 27 Dec 2017–2 Jan 2018 | 1,005 | – | 32 | 20 | 14 | 9 | 10 | 11 | 4 | 12 |
| 2017 federal election | 24 Sep 2017 | – | 23.8 | 32.9 | 20.5 | 12.6 | 10.7 | 9.2 | 8.9 | 5.0 | 12.4 |

=== 2017 ===
| Polling firm | Fieldwork date | Sample size | Abs. | Union | SPD | AfD | FDP | Linke | Grüne | Others | Lead |
|---|---|---|---|---|---|---|---|---|---|---|---|
| YouGov | 25–27 Dec 2017 | 1,489 | – | 33 | 21 | 13 | 9 | 10 | 10 | 4 | 12 |
| INSA | 21–22 Dec 2017 | 2,203 | – | 33 | 20.5 | 13 | 10.5 | 10 | 9.5 | 3.5 | 12.5 |
| Forsa | 18–22 Dec 2017 | 2,504 | 21 | 34 | 19 | 12 | 8 | 10 | 12 | 5 | 15 |
| Emnid | 14–20 Dec 2017 | 1,861 | – | 33 | 21 | 12 | 8 | 10 | 11 | 5 | 12 |
| INSA | 15–18 Dec 2017 | 2,031 | – | 31 | 21 | 14 | 9 | 11 | 10 | 4 | 10 |
| Forsa | 11–15 Dec 2017 | 2,501 | 21 | 33 | 20 | 12 | 8 | 10 | 12 | 5 | 13 |
| Allensbach | 1–14 Dec 2017 | 1,443 | – | 34 | 21 | 11 | 10 | 9 | 11.5 | 3.5 | 13 |
| Infratest dimap | 11–13 Dec 2017 | 1,029 | – | 32 | 20 | 13 | 9 | 9 | 12 | 5 | 12 |
| Emnid | 7–13 Dec 2017 | 1,865 | – | 32 | 22 | 13 | 8 | 9 | 11 | 5 | 10 |
| INSA | 8–11 Dec 2017 | 2,013 | – | 31 | 22 | 13.5 | 9 | 10.5 | 10.5 | 3.5 | 9 |
| Forsa | 9–10 Dec 2017 | 1,566 | – | 34 | 20 | 11 | 8 | 9 | 12 | 6 | 14 |
| Forsa | 4–8 Dec 2017 | 2,500 | 22 | 34 | 20 | 11 | 8 | 9 | 12 | 6 | 14 |
| Forschungsgruppe Wahlen | 5–7 Dec 2017 | 1,353 | – | 32 | 23 | 12 | 8 | 9 | 12 | 4 | 9 |
| Infratest dimap | 4–6 Dec 2017 | 1,504 | – | 32 | 21 | 13 | 9 | 10 | 11 | 4 | 11 |
| Emnid | 30 Nov–6 Dec 2017 | 1,880 | – | 33 | 21 | 12 | 9 | 10 | 11 | 4 | 12 |
| Civey | 30 Nov–5 Dec 2017 | 11,936 | – | 31.5 | 20.4 | 11.3 | 11.9 | 9.2 | 11.0 | 4.7 | 11.1 |
| INSA | 1–4 Dec 2017 | 2,063 | – | 31 | 22 | 13 | 10 | 11 | 10 | 3 | 9 |
| GMS | 28 Nov–1 Dec 2017 | 1,010 | – | 32 | 21 | 13 | 10 | 10 | 10 | 4 | 11 |
| Forsa | 27 Nov–1 Dec 2017 | 2,502 | 23 | 34 | 20 | 10 | 8 | 9 | 13 | 6 | 14 |
| Emnid | 23–29 Nov 2017 | 1,888 | – | 33 | 21 | 12 | 9 | 10 | 10 | 5 | 12 |
| YouGov | 24–28 Nov 2017 | 1,570 | – | 32 | 21 | 13 | 9 | 10 | 10 | 5 | 11 |
| Civey | 21–28 Nov 2017 | 10,024 | – | 31.7 | 20.4 | 10.6 | 13.1 | 8.9 | 11.0 | 4.3 | 11.3 |
| INSA | 24–27 Nov 2017 | 2,003 | – | 32 | 22 | 13 | 10 | 10 | 10 | 3 | 10 |
| Allensbach | 22–27 Nov 2017 | 1,299 | – | 33 | 21.5 | 11 | 10 | 9 | 11 | 4.5 | 11.5 |
| Forsa | 20–24 Nov 2017 | 2,508 | 24 | 33 | 19 | 11 | 10 | 9 | 12 | 6 | 14 |
| Emnid | 20–23 Nov 2017 | 1,225 | – | 33 | 22 | 11 | 9 | 10 | 10 | 5 | 11 |
| INSA | 21–22 Nov 2017 | 1,069 | – | 32 | 21 | 12 | 12 | 10 | 10 | 3 | 11 |
| Civey | 20–21 Nov 2017 | 5,044 | – | 29.2 | 19.5 | 13.6 | 13.2 | 8.4 | 11.9 | 4.1 | 9.7 |
| Forsa | 20 Nov 2017 | 1,789 | – | 31 | 21 | 12 | 10 | 9 | 12 | 5 | 10 |
| Infratest dimap | 20 Nov 2017 | 1,011 | – | 32 | 22 | 11 | 10 | 10 | 11 | 4 | 10 |
| INSA | 20 Nov 2017 | 1,034 | – | 30 | 21 | 14 | 11 | 11 | 10 | 3 | 9 |
| INSA | 17–19 Nov 2017 | 2,027 | – | 31 | 21 | 14 | 10 | 11.5 | 9.5 | 3 | 10 |
| Forsa | 13–17 Nov 2017 | 2,505 | 21 | 32 | 20 | 12 | 12 | 8 | 11 | 5 | 12 |
| Forschungsgruppe Wahlen | 14–16 Nov 2017 | 1,303 | – | 33 | 21 | 11 | 10 | 9 | 12 | 4 | 12 |
| Infratest dimap | 10–15 Nov 2017 | 1,382 | – | 31 | 21 | 12 | 11 | 10 | 11 | 4 | 10 |
| Emnid | 9–15 Nov 2017 | 1,842 | – | 31 | 21 | 13 | 10 | 9 | 11 | 5 | 10 |
| INSA | 10–13 Nov 2017 | 2,049 | – | 32 | 20 | 13.5 | 10.5 | 10.5 | 9 | 4.5 | 12 |
| Forsa | 6–10 Nov 2017 | 2,506 | 21 | 32 | 20 | 12 | 12 | 9 | 10 | 5 | 12 |
| Infratest dimap | 6–8 Nov 2017 | 1,505 | – | 30 | 21 | 13 | 12 | 9 | 11 | 4 | 9 |
| Emnid | 2–8 Nov 2017 | 1,392 | – | 30 | 22 | 13 | 11 | 10 | 10 | 4 | 8 |
| INSA | 3–6 Nov 2017 | 2,023 | – | 31 | 22 | 13.5 | 10.5 | 10.5 | 8.5 | 4 | 9 |
| Civey | 27 Oct–6 Nov 2017 | 10,012 | – | 31.0 | 20.4 | 13.7 | 11.0 | 9.4 | 10.2 | 4.3 | 10.6 |
| Forsa | 30 Oct–3 Nov 2017 | 2,005 | 22 | 32 | 21 | 12 | 11 | 9 | 10 | 5 | 11 |
| Emnid | 26–30 Oct 2017 | 1,476 | – | 31 | 21 | 12 | 10 | 10 | 11 | 5 | 10 |
| INSA | 27–28 Oct 2017 | 1,024 | – | 31 | 21 | 13 | 11 | 10 | 10 | 4 | 10 |
| Forsa | 23–27 Oct 2017 | 2,500 | 23 | 33 | 20 | 11 | 11 | 9 | 11 | 5 | 13 |
| Forschungsgruppe Wahlen | 24–26 Oct 2017 | 1,325 | – | 33 | 21 | 12 | 10 | 9 | 11 | 4 | 12 |
| Emnid | 19–25 Oct 2017 | 2,296 | – | 31 | 22 | 12 | 11 | 9 | 10 | 5 | 9 |
| INSA | 23 Oct 2017 | 1,002 | – | 33 | 21 | 13 | 10 | 10 | 9 | 4 | 12 |
| Forsa | 16–20 Oct 2017 | 2,503 | 25 | 31 | 22 | 11 | 11 | 10 | 10 | 5 | 9 |
| Allensbach | 7–19 Oct 2017 | 1,454 | – | 33 | 20.5 | 12 | 12 | 9 | 9.5 | 4 | 12.5 |
| Infratest dimap | 16–18 Oct 2017 | 1,026 | – | 31 | 21 | 12 | 12 | 9 | 11 | 4 | 10 |
| Emnid | 12–18 Oct 2017 | 2,304 | – | 32 | 21 | 12 | 11 | 9 | 10 | 5 | 11 |
| GMS | 12–18 Oct 2017 | 1,005 | – | 31 | 21 | 13 | 12 | 10 | 9 | 4 | 10 |
| INSA | 13–16 Oct 2017 | 2,011 | – | 32 | 21.5 | 13 | 10 | 9 | 9.5 | 5 | 10.5 |
| Forsa | 9–13 Oct 2017 | 2,501 | 25 | 32 | 20 | 12 | 11 | 9 | 11 | 5 | 12 |
| Forschungsgruppe Wahlen | 10–12 Oct 2017 | 1,180 | – | 31 | 21 | 12 | 11 | 10 | 11 | 4 | 10 |
| Infratest dimap | 9–11 Oct 2017 | 1,506 | – | 32 | 20 | 11 | 11 | 10 | 10 | 6 | 12 |
| Emnid | 5–11 Oct 2017 | 1,960 | – | 31 | 21 | 12 | 11 | 10 | 10 | 5 | 10 |
| INSA | 6–9 Oct 2017 | 2,015 | – | 32 | 22 | 13 | 11 | 9 | 9 | 4 | 10 |
| Forsa | 2–6 Oct 2017 | 2,001 | 24 | 32 | 20 | 12 | 11 | 9 | 11 | 5 | 12 |
| Emnid | 28 Sep–4 Oct 2017 | 1,490 | – | 32 | 22 | 12 | 10 | 10 | 9 | 5 | 10 |
| Forsa | 25–29 Sep 2017 | 2,005 | 25 | 32 | 20 | 12 | 11 | 10 | 10 | 5 | 12 |
| INSA | 27–28 Sep 2017 | 1,071 | – | 31 | 21 | 13 | 12 | 9 | 10 | 4 | 10 |
| Forschungsgruppe Wahlen | 26–28 Sep 2017 | 1,425 | – | 32 | 21 | 12 | 10 | 10 | 11 | 4 | 11 |
| Emnid | 25–27 Sep 2017 | 1,038 | – | 33 | 21 | 12 | 11 | 10 | 10 | 3 | 12 |
| 2017 federal election | 24 Sep 2017 | – | 23.8 | 32.9 | 20.5 | 12.6 | 10.7 | 9.2 | 8.9 | 5.0 | 12.4 |

=== CDU and CSU ===
| Polling firm | Fieldwork date | Sample size | CDU | SPD | AfD | FDP | Linke | Grüne | CSU | Others | Lead |
|---|---|---|---|---|---|---|---|---|---|---|---|
| 2021 federal election | 26 Sep 2017 | – | 19.0 | 25.7 | 10.4 | 11.4 | 4.9 | 14.7 | 5.2 | 8.7 | 6.8 |
| INSA | 17–20 Sep 2021 | 2,054 | 17 | 25 | 11 | 12 | 6.5 | 15 | 5 | 8.5 | 8 |
| INSA | 10–13 Sep 2021 | 2,062 | 16 | 26 | 11.5 | 12.5 | 6.5 | 15 | 4.5 | 8 | 10 |
| INSA | 3–6 Sep 2021 | 2,052 | 15.5 | 26 | 11 | 12.5 | 6.5 | 15.5 | 5 | 8 | 10.5 |
| INSA | 27–30 Aug 2021 | 2,015 | 15 | 25 | 11 | 13.5 | 7 | 16.5 | 5 | 7 | 8.5 |
| INSA | 20–23 Aug 2021 | 2,119 | 18 | 23 | 11 | 13 | 7 | 17 | 5 | 6 | 5 |
| INSA | 13–16 Aug 2021 | 2,080 | 20 | 20 | 11 | 12.5 | 6.5 | 17.5 | 5 | 7.5 | Tie |
| INSA | 6–9 Aug 2021 | 2,118 | 20.5 | 17.5 | 11.5 | 12.5 | 6.5 | 17.5 | 5 | 9 | 3 |
| INSA | 30 Jul–2 Aug 2021 | 2,080 | 22.5 | 18 | 11 | 13 | 7 | 18 | 5 | 5.5 | 4.5 |
| INSA | 23–26 Jul 2021 | 2,007 | 22 | 17.5 | 12 | 13 | 6 | 17.5 | 5 | 7 | 4.5 |
| INSA | 16–19 Jul 2021 | 2,064 | 23.5 | 16.5 | 11.5 | 12 | 6 | 18 | 5.5 | 7 | 5.5 |
| INSA | 9–12 Jul 2021 | 2,087 | 23 | 17 | 11 | 12.5 | 7 | 17 | 5 | 7.5 | 6 |
| INSA | 2–5 Jul 2021 | 2,056 | 23 | 16.5 | 10 | 12.5 | 7 | 18 | 6 | 7 | 5 |
| INSA | 25–28 June 2021 | 2,060 | 23.5 | 16 | 11 | 13 | 7.5 | 18 | 6 | 5 | 5.5 |
| INSA | 18–21 June 2021 | 2,082 | 22 | 15.5 | 10.5 | 14 | 7 | 19 | 6.5 | 5.5 | 3 |
| INSA | 11–14 June 2021 | 2,038 | 22 | 16.5 | 11 | 13.5 | 6 | 19.5 | 5.5 | 6 | 2.5 |
| INSA | 4–7 June 2021 | 2,015 | 20.5 | 15.5 | 11 | 13.5 | 7 | 20.5 | 6 | 6 | Tie |
| INSA | 28–31 May 2021 | 2,040 | 19.5 | 15.5 | 11 | 13.5 | 6.5 | 21.5 | 6 | 6.5 | 2 |
| INSA | 21–25 May 2021 | 2,128 | 20 | 16 | 11.5 | 12.5 | 6.5 | 22 | 6 | 5.5 | 2 |
| INSA | 14–17 May 2021 | 2,023 | 20.5 | 16 | 11 | 12.5 | 6.5 | 23 | 5 | 5.5 | 2.5 |
| INSA | 7–10 May 2021 | 2,055 | 19.5 | 15 | 11 | 12 | 7.5 | 23.5 | 6 | 5.5 | 4 |
| INSA | 30 Apr–3 May 2021 | 2,075 | 19 | 15 | 12 | 12 | 7 | 24 | 5 | 6 | 5 |
| INSA | 23–26 Apr 2021 | 2,082 | 19 | 16 | 12 | 12 | 8 | 23 | 4 | 6 | 4 |
| INSA | 16–19 Apr 2021 | 3,057 | 21.5 | 16 | 12 | 11 | 7 | 21 | 6.5 | 5 | 0.5 |
| INSA | 9–12 Apr 2021 | 3,174 | 21 | 17 | 12 | 10 | 7 | 20.5 | 6.5 | 6 | 0.5 |
| INSA | 30 Mar–1 Apr 2021 | 3,020 | 21 | 17 | 12 | 10 | 7 | 21 | 6 | 6 | Tie |
| INSA | 26–29 Mar 2021 | 3,049 | 19 | 18 | 11 | 10.5 | 7 | 21 | 7 | 6.5 | 2 |
| INSA | 19–22 Mar 2021 | 3,104 | 21 | 18 | 11 | 10.5 | 7 | 20 | 7 | 5.5 | 1 |
| INSA | 12–15 Mar 2021 | 2,068 | 24 | 17 | 11.5 | 10.5 | 8 | 17 | 5.5 | 6.5 | 7 |
| INSA | 5–8 Mar 2021 | 2,049 | 23 | 17 | 11.5 | 10.5 | 9 | 17 | 7 | 5 | 6 |
| INSA | 26 Feb–1 Mar 2021 | 2,032 | 25.5 | 17 | 11 | 10 | 8 | 17 | 7 | 4.5 | 8.5 |
| INSA | 19-22 Feb 2021 | 2,075 | 27 | 16 | 11 | 9 | 8 | 17 | 6.5 | 5.5 | 10 |
| INSA | 12-15 Feb 2021 | 2,051 | 27.5 | 17 | 10.5 | 9 | 9 | 17 | 6 | 4 | 10.5 |
| INSA | 5-8 Feb 2021 | 2,107 | 28.5 | 16 | 10.5 | 9 | 8.5 | 17.5 | 6 | 4 | 11 |
| INSA | 29 Jan-1 Feb 2021 | 2,044 | 29 | 15 | 11 | 8 | 7.5 | 17 | 7.5 | 5 | 12 |
| INSA | 22-25 Jan 2021 | 2,038 | 28 | 16 | 10 | 8 | 8 | 17 | 7 | 6 | 11 |
| INSA | 17-18 Jan 2021 | 1,835 | 28 | 15 | 11 | 9 | 8 | 17 | 7 | 5 | 11 |
| INSA | 8-11 Jan 2021 | 2,042 | 28 | 15 | 10 | 7.5 | 8 | 18 | 8 | 5.5 | 10 |
| INSA | 1-4 Jan 2021 | 2,072 | 29 | 15 | 11 | 7.5 | 7.5 | 18 | 7 | 5 | 11 |
| INSA | 18-21 Dec 2020 | 2,055 | 27 | 16 | 11 | 8 | 7.5 | 16.5 | 8 | 6 | 10.5 |
| INSA | 11-14 Dec 2020 | 2,002 | 29 | 17 | 10 | 7 | 7.5 | 17 | 7 | 5.5 | 12 |
| INSA | 4-7 Dec 2020 | 2,057 | 27.5 | 15.5 | 10 | 8 | 7.5 | 17.5 | 8 | 6 | 10 |
| INSA | 27-30 Nov 2020 | 2,046 | 28.5 | 15.5 | 11 | 7.5 | 7 | 17.5 | 7 | 6 | 11 |
| INSA | 20-23 Nov 2020 | 2,063 | 28 | 15.5 | 11 | 7 | 7 | 17.5 | 8 | 6 | 10.5 |
| INSA | 13-16 Nov 2020 | 2,077 | 29.5 | 15.5 | 11 | 7 | 7.5 | 17.5 | 7 | 5 | 12 |
| INSA | 6-9 Nov 2020 | 2,030 | 27 | 15.5 | 12 | 7 | 7.5 | 17.5 | 7.5 | 6 | 9.5 |
| INSA | 30 Oct-2 Nov 2020 | 2,035 | 27 | 15.5 | 11 | 6.5 | 8.5 | 18 | 7.5 | 6 | 9 |
| INSA | 23-26 Oct 2020 | 2,069 | 29 | 14.5 | 12 | 6.5 | 7.5 | 17.5 | 6.5 | 6.5 | 11.5 |
| INSA | 16-19 Oct 2020 | 2,074 | 29 | 14.5 | 11.5 | 7.5 | 8 | 18 | 6 | 5.5 | 11 |
| INSA | 9-12 Oct 2020 | 2,084 | 29 | 14.5 | 11 | 7 | 8 | 18.5 | 6 | 6 | 10.5 |
| INSA | 2-5 Oct 2020 | 2,058 | 28 | 14.5 | 11.5 | 6 | 7 | 18.5 | 8 | 6.5 | 9.5 |
| INSA | 25-28 Sep 2020 | 2,065 | 27 | 15.5 | 11.5 | 6.5 | 6.5 | 19 | 8 | 6 | 8 |
| INSA | 18-21 Sep 2020 | 2,067 | 28 | 15.5 | 12 | 6.5 | 7.5 | 17.5 | 7 | 6 | 10.5 |
| INSA | 11-14 Sep 2020 | 2,036 | 27.5 | 16 | 11.5 | 7 | 7.5 | 17 | 8 | 5.5 | 10.5 |
| INSA | 4-7 Sep 2020 | 2,068 | 27 | 16 | 11 | 6.5 | 8 | 18 | 8 | 5.5 | 9 |
| INSA | 28-31 Aug 2020 | 2,068 | 29 | 16 | 11 | 6 | 7.5 | 17.5 | 7.5 | 5.5 | 11.5 |
| INSA | 21-24 Aug 2020 | 2,067 | 28 | 17 | 11 | 6.5 | 9 | 16 | 7.5 | 5 | 11 |
| INSA | 14-17 Aug 2020 | 2,101 | 28 | 18 | 11 | 6 | 8 | 16 | 8 | 5 | 10 |
| INSA | 7-10 Aug 2020 | 2,036 | 28 | 16 | 11 | 6.5 | 8.5 | 16 | 8.5 | 5.5 | 12 |
| INSA | 31 Jul-3 Aug 2020 | 2,090 | 28.5 | 15 | 11 | 6.5 | 8.5 | 16.5 | 8 | 6 | 12 |
| INSA | 24-27 Jul 2020 | 2,039 | 28.5 | 15 | 11 | 7 | 8 | 16 | 8 | 6.5 | 12.5 |
| INSA | 17-20 Jul 2020 | 2,049 | 29.5 | 16 | 10 | 7.5 | 7.5 | 16 | 7 | 6.5 | 13.5 |
| INSA | 10-13 Jul 2020 | 2,051 | 29 | 14.5 | 11 | 7 | 8.5 | 16.5 | 8 | 5,5 | 12.5 |
| INSA | 3-6 Jul 2020 | 2,040 | 29 | 15 | 11 | 7 | 8 | 17 | 7 | 6 | 12 |
| INSA | 26-29 Jun 2020 | 2,051 | 28.5 | 16 | 10.5 | 7 | 8 | 17 | 8 | 5 | 11.5 |
| INSA | 19-22 Jun 2020 | 2,058 | 29.5 | 15 | 10 | 6 | 8.5 | 18.5 | 7 | 5.5 | 11 |
| INSA | 12-15 Jun 2020 | 2,069 | 31 | 14 | 10 | 7 | 8 | 18 | 6 | 5 | 13 |
| INSA | 5-8 Jun 2020 | 2,051 | 31 | 14 | 10 | 6.5 | 8.5 | 17.5 | 7 | 5.5 | 13.5 |
| INSA | 29 May-2 Jun 2020 | 2,047 | 30.5 | 14 | 10 | 5.5 | 8 | 18 | 8 | 6 | 12.5 |
| INSA | 22–25 May 2020 | 2,062 | 30 | 15 | 9.5 | 6 | 8 | 18 | 7 | 6.5 | 12 |
| INSA | 15–18 May 2020 | 2,092 | 30 | 14 | 10.5 | 6 | 7.5 | 18 | 7 | 7 | 12 |
| INSA | 8–11 May 2020 | 2,061 | 29.5 | 14 | 11 | 6.5 | 7.5 | 16.5 | 8 | 7 | 13 |
| INSA | 1–4 May 2020 | 2,101 | 30 | 15 | 11 | 6 | 7.5 | 17 | 7.5 | 6 | 13 |
| INSA | 24-27 Apr 2020 | 2,071 | 29 | 15.5 | 10.5 | 7 | 7 | 16 | 9 | 6 | 13 |
| INSA | 17-20 Apr 2020 | 2,054 | 29.5 | 15 | 10.5 | 7 | 7.5 | 16 | 9 | 5.5 | 13.5 |
| INSA | 9-14 Apr 2020 | 2,108 | 29.5 | 16 | 10.5 | 7 | 7.5 | 16 | 8 | 5.5 | 13.5 |
| INSA | 3-6 Apr 2020 | 2,062 | 29 | 16 | 10 | 5.5 | 7 | 18 | 9 | 5.5 | 11 |
| INSA | 27-30 Mar 2020 | 2,061 | 27.5 | 15 | 12 | 6.5 | 7.5 | 18 | 7.5 | 6 | 9.5 |
| INSA | 20-23 Mar 2020 | 2,070 | 26.5 | 15 | 12 | 6.5 | 7 | 20 | 7 | 6 | 6.5 |
| INSA | 13-16 Mar 2020 | 2,049 | 22 | 14.5 | 13 | 6.5 | 9.5 | 23 | 6.5 | 5 | 1 |
| INSA | 6-9 Mar 2020 | 2,050 | 20.5 | 15.5 | 14 | 6.5 | 9.5 | 22 | 6 | 6 | 1.5 |
| INSA | 28 Feb-2 Mar 2020 | 2,061 | 20.5 | 16 | 13.5 | 6 | 10 | 23 | 6 | 5 | 2.5 |
| INSA | 21-24 Feb 2020 | 2,033 | 20 | 14.5 | 13 | 7 | 10.5 | 22 | 6.5 | 6.5 | 2 |
| INSA | 14-17 Feb 2020 | 2,065 | 21 | 14.5 | 15 | 7.5 | 9.5 | 20.5 | 5.5 | 6.5 | 0.5 |
| INSA | 7-10 Feb 2020 | 2,086 | 22 | 12.5 | 14 | 8 | 10 | 22 | 5.5 | 6 | Tie |
| INSA | 31 Jan-3 Feb 2020 | 2,059 | 22 | 13 | 14 | 9 | 8 | 22 | 6 | 6 | Tie |
| INSA | 24-27 Jan 2020 | 2,081 | 20 | 14 | 15 | 9 | 8.5 | 20.5 | 7 | 6 | 0.5 |
| INSA | 17-20 Jan 2020 | 2,122 | 21.5 | 13 | 15 | 8.5 | 9 | 21 | 6 | 6 | 0.5 |
| INSA | 10-13 Jan 2020 2020 | 2,040 | 21 | 12.5 | 15 | 9.5 | 9 | 21 | 6 | 6 | Tie |
| INSA | 3-6 Jan 2020 | 2,048 | 23 | 13 | 15 | 9 | 8.5 | 21.5 | 6 | 5 | 1.5 |
| INSA | 20-23 Dec 2019 | 2,034 | 21 | 13 | 15 | 10 | 8 | 21 | 7 | 5 | Tie |
| INSA | 13-16 Dec 2019 | 2,020 | 21 | 13 | 15 | 8.5 | 9.5 | 21 | 6 | 6 | Tie |
| INSA | 6-9 Dec 2019 | 2,052 | 22.5 | 14 | 15 | 8.5 | 8.5 | 20.5 | 5.5 | 5.5 | 2 |
| INSA | 29 Nov-2 Dec 2019 | 2,060 | 21 | 13.5 | 15 | 8.5 | 9 | 21.5 | 5.5 | 6 | 0.5 |
| INSA | 22-25 Nov 2019 | 2,069 | 22 | 14.5 | 14 | 8.5 | 9.5 | 22 | 4.5 | 5 | Tie |
| INSA | 15-18 Nov 2019 | 4.115 | 20 | 15.5 | 15 | 8.5 | 10 | 21 | 5 | 5 | 1 |
| INSA | 8-11 Nov 2019 | 2.096 | 19.5 | 15.5 | 15 | 8 | 9.5 | 20.5 | 6 | 6 | 1 |
| INSA | 1-4 Nov 2019 | 2.047 | 19.5 | 13.5 | 16 | 8 | 10 | 21 | 6 | 6 | 1.5 |
| INSA | 25-28 Oct 2019 | 2.042 | 20 | 13.5 | 15.5 | 7.5 | 9 | 23 | 6 | 5.5 | 3 |
| INSA | 18-21 Oct 2019 | 2.041 | 21 | 13.5 | 15 | 7.5 | 9 | 22.5 | 6 | 5.5 | 1.5 |
| INSA | 11-14 Oct 2019 | 2.052 | 21 | 14 | 15 | 7.5 | 8 | 21.5 | 7 | 6 | 0.5 |
| INSA | 4-7 Oct 2019 | 2,059 | 21 | 13 | 16 | 8.5 | 9 | 21 | 6 | 5.5 | Tie |
| INSA | 27-30 Sep 2019 | 2.058 | 21.5 | 13 | 16 | 8 | 8 | 22 | 5 | 6.5 | 0.5 |
| INSA | 20-23 Sep 2019 | 2.052 | 20.8 | 14 | 16 | 8 | 8 | 22 | 5.2 | 6 | 1.2 |
| INSA | 13-16 Sep 2019 | 2,053 | 20.4 | 13.5 | 16 | 7.5 | 7.5 | 22.5 | 6.1 | 6.5 | 2.1 |
| INSA | 6-9 Sep 2019 | 2,033 | 21 | 13.5 | 15.5 | 8 | 7.5 | 22 | 6 | 6.5 | 1 |
| INSA | 30 Aug–2 Sep 2019 | 2,017 | 20.2 | 14.5 | 15 | 8.5 | 7 | 23.5 | 5.8 | 5.5 | 3.3 |
| INSA | 23–26 Aug 2019 | 2,058 | 21 | 13 | 15 | 8 | 8 | 24 | 5 | 6 | 3 |
| INSA | 16–19 Aug 2019 | 2,056 | 21.5 | 13 | 14.5 | 9 | 8 | 24.5 | 5 | 5.5 | 3 |
| INSA | 9–11 Aug 2019 | 2,060 | 21.5 | 12 | 14.5 | 9 | 8 | 23.5 | 6 | 5.5 | 2 |
| INSA | 2–5 Aug 2019 | 2,049 | 21 | 11.5 | 15 | 9 | 9 | 23.5 | 6.5 | 4.5 | 2.5 |
| INSA | 26–29 Jul 2019 | 2,036 | 21.5 | 12.5 | 14.5 | 9 | 8 | 24.5 | 5.5 | 4.5 | 3 |
| INSA | 19–22 Jul 2019 | 2,081 | 22.7 | 12.5 | 14.5 | 8 | 8 | 22.5 | 5.8 | 6 | 0.2 |
| INSA | 12–15 Jul 2019 | 2,043 | 20 | 14 | 14 | 9 | 9 | 23 | 6 | 5 | 3 |
| INSA | 5–8 Jul 2019 | 2,069 | 20.8 | 13.5 | 14 | 8 | 8.5 | 24 | 6.2 | 5 | 3.2 |
| INSA | 28 Jun–1 Jul 2019 | 2,053 | 23 | 13 | 14 | 8 | 8 | 24 | 4 | 6 | 1 |
| INSA | 21–24 Jun 2019 | 2,078 | 19.4 | 12.5 | 13.5 | 8.5 | 9 | 25.5 | 6.1 | 5.5 | 6.1 |
| INSA | 14–17 Jun 2019 | 2,060 | 20 | 13 | 13.5 | 9 | 9 | 25 | 5 | 5.5 | 5 |
| INSA | 7–10 Jun 2019 | 2,074 | 18 | 13 | 13.5 | 9 | 7.5 | 26.5 | 6 | 6.5 | 8.5 |
| INSA | 3 Jun 2019 | 1,000 | 21 | 14 | 13 | 8 | 8 | 25 | 5 | 6 | 4 |
| INSA | 24–27 May 2019 | 2,039 | 21 | 15.5 | 13.5 | 9.5 | 9 | 19 | 6.5 | 6 | 2 |
| INSA | 17–20 May 2019 | 2,074 | 22 | 15.5 | 14 | 10 | 9 | 18.5 | 6 | 5 | 3.5 |
| INSA | 10–13 May 2019 | 2,044 | 23.5 | 16 | 14 | 9.5 | 9 | 19 | 5 | 4 | 4.5 |
| INSA | 3–6 May 2019 | 2,089 | 22.5 | 16 | 14 | 9 | 8.5 | 20 | 6 | 4 | 2.5 |
| INSA | 26–29 Apr 2019 | 2,005 | 23 | 16 | 14 | 10 | 9 | 19 | 5 | 4 | 4 |
| INSA | 18–21 Apr 2019 | 1,005 | 24.4 | 16 | 14 | 10 | 10 | 17 | 5.6 | 3 | 7.4 |
| INSA | 12–15 Apr 2019 | 2,013 | 25.1 | 15.5 | 14 | 9 | 9 | 18 | 5.4 | 4 | 7.1 |
| INSA | 5–8 Apr 2019 | 2,040 | 23.5 | 15.5 | 14 | 10 | 8.5 | 19 | 5.5 | 4 | 4.5 |
| INSA | 28 Mar–1 Apr 2019 | 4,000 | 23.5 | 16.5 | 13.5 | 10 | 8.5 | 17.5 | 6 | 4.5 | 6 |
| INSA | 22–25 Mar 2019 | 2,012 | 23.5 | 15.5 | 13.5 | 9 | 9 | 17.5 | 7 | 5 | 6 |
| INSA | 15–18 Mar 2019 | 2,030 | 22.5 | 16 | 14.5 | 9 | 9 | 17.5 | 7 | 4.5 | 5 |
| INSA | 8–11 Mar 2019 | 2,005 | 23.5 | 15 | 14.5 | 10 | 9 | 17.5 | 7 | 3.5 | 6 |
| INSA | 27 Feb–1 Mar 2019 | 4,000 | 23 | 17 | 14.5 | 10 | 10 | 15.5 | 6 | 4 | 6 |
| INSA | 22–25 Feb 2019 | 2,048 | 23.5 | 18 | 14 | 9.5 | 9 | 15.5 | 6 | 4.5 | 5.5 |
| INSA | 15–18 Feb 2019 | 2,046 | 25 | 18 | 14 | 9 | 9.5 | 15 | 5 | 4.5 | 7 |
| INSA | 8–11 Feb 2019 | 2,051 | 24 | 15.5 | 14 | 8.5 | 10.5 | 18.5 | 6 | 3.5 | 5.5 |
| INSA | 1–4 Feb 2019 | 2,034 | 24 | 14.5 | 14 | 8.5 | 10.5 | 18.5 | 6 | 4 | 5.5 |
| INSA | 25–28 Jan 2019 | 2,056 | 24 | 15 | 14 | 9 | 10 | 18 | 6 | 4 | 6 |
| INSA | 18–21 Jan 2019 | 2,044 | 25 | 13.5 | 13 | 9.5 | 9.5 | 19.5 | 6 | 4 | 5.5 |
| INSA | 11–14 Jan 2019 | 2,028 | 22.5 | 14.5 | 14.5 | 9.5 | 10.5 | 18 | 6.5 | 4 | 4.5 |
| INSA | 5–7 Jan 2019 | 2,056 | 23.5 | 15 | 15 | 10 | 10 | 17 | 6.5 | 3 | 6.5 |
| INSA | 2–3 Jan 2019 | 1,026 | 23 | 15 | 14 | 10 | 10 | 18 | 6 | 4 | 5 |
| INSA | 20–21 Dec 2018 | 1,029 | 23 | 14 | 15 | 9 | 9 | 19 | 6 | 5 | 4 |
| INSA | 14–17 Dec 2018 | 2,077 | 23 | 15 | 15 | 9.5 | 9.5 | 18 | 6 | 4 | 5 |
| INSA | 8–10 Dec 2018 | 2,047 | 23 | 15 | 15 | 10 | 10 | 17 | 6 | 4 | 6 |
| INSA | 30 Nov–3 Dec 2018 | 2,069 | 21.5 | 13.5 | 16 | 9.5 | 11 | 18 | 6 | 4.5 | 3.5 |
| INSA | 23–26 Nov 2018 | 2,062 | 22 | 14 | 16 | 8.5 | 10 | 19 | 5.5 | 5 | 3 |
| INSA | 16–19 Nov 2018 | 2,047 | 20 | 14.5 | 15.5 | 9.5 | 10 | 20 | 5.5 | 5 | Tie |
| INSA | 9–12 Nov 2018 | 2,070 | 20.5 | 14 | 16.5 | 9 | 10 | 20 | 5 | 5 | 0.5 |
| INSA | 2–5 Nov 2018 | 3,138 | 19 | 13.5 | 16.5 | 10 | 11 | 19 | 5.5 | 5.5 | Tie |
| INSA | 26–29 Oct 2018 | 2,052 | 19 | 14 | 16.5 | 9.5 | 11 | 20 | 6 | 4 | 1 |
| INSA | 19–22 Oct 2018 | 2,061 | 21 | 15 | 17 | 9 | 10.5 | 19 | 5 | 3.5 | 2 |
| INSA | 12–15 Oct 2018 | 2,061 | 21 | 15 | 18 | 9.5 | 10.5 | 17 | 5.5 | 3.5 | 3 |
| INSA | 5–8 Oct 2018 | 2,054 | 21 | 16 | 18 | 10 | 11 | 15 | 5 | 4 | 3 |
| INSA | 28 Sep–1 Oct 2018 | 2,041 | 20 | 16 | 18.5 | 10 | 11.5 | 14.5 | 6 | 3.5 | 1.5 |
| INSA | 21–24 Sep 2018 | 2,051 | 23 | 16 | 18 | 10 | 11.5 | 14.5 | 4 | 3 | 5 |
| INSA | 14–17 Sep 2018 | 2,054 | 23.5 | 17 | 17.5 | 9 | 10.5 | 13 | 5 | 4.5 | 6 |
| INSA | 7–10 Sep 2018 | 2,042 | 21 | 17 | 17.5 | 9 | 10.5 | 13.5 | 7 | 4.5 | 3.5 |
| INSA | 31 Aug–3 Sep 2018 | 2,069 | 22.7 | 16 | 17 | 9.5 | 10 | 13.5 | 5.8 | 5.5 | 5.7 |
| INSA | 24–27 Aug 2018 | 2,079 | 23 | 16.5 | 16.5 | 10 | 10.5 | 13.5 | 5 | 5 | 6.5 |
| INSA | 16–20 Aug 2018 | 3,129 | 22 | 16.5 | 16 | 10 | 12 | 13.5 | 6 | 4 | 5.5 |
| INSA | 10–13 Aug 2018 | 2,034 | 22 | 17.5 | 17 | 9.5 | 11 | 12.5 | 7 | 3.5 | 4.5 |
| INSA | 3–6 Aug 2018 | 2,096 | 24 | 17 | 17 | 8.5 | 11 | 12.5 | 6 | 4 | 7 |
| INSA | 27–30 Jul 2018 | 2,074 | 24 | 18 | 17.5 | 9 | 10.5 | 12 | 5 | 4 | 6 |
| Forsa | 23–27 Jul 2018 | 2,505 | 27 | 18 | 14 | 9 | 9 | 13 | 5 | 5 | 9 |
| INSA | 20–23 Jul 2018 | 2,056 | 24 | 18 | 17.5 | 9 | 10.5 | 12 | 5 | 4 | 6 |
| Forsa | 16–20 Jul 2018 | 2,505 | 26 | 18 | 15 | 8 | 10 | 13 | 5 | 5 | 8 |
| INSA | 13–16 Jul 2018 | 2,084 | 23 | 17 | 17.5 | 9.5 | 10 | 13 | 6 | 4 | 5.5 |
| Forsa | 9–13 Jul 2018 | 2,505 | 26 | 17 | 16 | 9 | 9 | 13 | 5 | 5 | 9 |
| INSA | 6–9 Jul 2018 | 2,061 | 24 | 17 | 17.5 | 9.5 | 11 | 12 | 5 | 4 | 6.5 |
| INSA | 29 Jun–2 Jul 2018 | 2,089 | 23 | 19 | 16.5 | 9 | 11 | 12 | 6 | 3.5 | 4 |
| Forsa | 25–29 Jun 2018 | 2,508 | 26 | 17 | 15 | 10 | 10 | 12 | 5 | 5 | 9 |
| INSA | 22–25 Jun 2018 | 2,036 | 23 | 19.5 | 16 | 9 | 11 | 11 | 6 | 4.5 | 4 |
| INSA | 15–18 Jun 2018 | 2,060 | 23 | 19 | 16 | 8 | 12 | 11 | 6 | 5 | 4 |
| INSA | 8–11 Jun 2018 | 2,038 | 24.2 | 17 | 16 | 8 | 12 | 11 | 6.8 | 5 | 7.2 |
| INSA | 1–4 Jun 2018 | 2,067 | 27.0 | 17 | 16 | 8 | 11.5 | 11 | 5.0 | 4.5 | 10.0 |
| INSA | 25–28 May 2018 | 2,062 | 25.6 | 17 | 15.5 | 8 | 12 | 11.5 | 6.4 | 4 | 8.6 |
| INSA | 18–22 May 2018 | 2,044 | 26.9 | 16.5 | 15.5 | 8 | 11 | 11.5 | 5.6 | 5 | 10.4 |
| INSA | 11–14 May 2018 | 2,098 | 26.9 | 17 | 15.5 | 8 | 11 | 11.5 | 5.6 | 4.5 | 9.9 |
| INSA | 4–7 May 2018 | 2,065 | 25.3 | 17 | 15.5 | 8.5 | 10.5 | 11.5 | 7.2 | 4.5 | 8.3 |
| INSA | 27–30 Apr 2018 | 2,097 | 26.7 | 17 | 15.5 | 9 | 10.5 | 11.5 | 6.3 | 3.5 | 9.7 |
| INSA | 20–23 Apr 2018 | 2,091 | 26.0 | 18 | 15.5 | 9.5 | 10.5 | 12 | 5.5 | 3 | 8.0 |
| INSA | 13–16 Apr 2018 | 2,054 | 25.2 | 18.5 | 15 | 9 | 11 | 11.5 | 6.3 | 3.5 | 6.7 |
| INSA | 6–9 Apr 2018 | 2,048 | 27.0 | 17.5 | 15.5 | 9 | 12 | 11.5 | 4.5 | 3 | 9.5 |
| INSA | 29–31 Mar 2018 | 1,074 | 26.7 | 18 | 15 | 10 | 12 | 10 | 5.3 | 3 | 8.7 |
| INSA | 23–26 Mar 2018 | 2,051 | 26.9 | 17 | 15 | 10 | 12 | 10.5 | 5.6 | 3 | 9.9 |
| INSA | 16–19 Mar 2018 | 2,066 | 25.0 | 17.5 | 15 | 10 | 12 | 10.5 | 7.0 | 3 | 7.5 |
| INSA | 9–12 Mar 2018 | 2,033 | 25.9 | 17.5 | 15 | 9.5 | 12 | 11 | 6.1 | 3 | 8.4 |
| INSA | 5 Mar 2018 | 1,052 | 28.5 | 15 | 15 | 10 | 12 | 12 | 4.5 | 3 | 13.5 |
| INSA | 23–26 Feb 2018 | 1,063 | 26.8 | 15.5 | 16 | 9 | 12 | 12 | 5.7 | 3 | 10.8 |
| INSA | 16–19 Feb 2018 | 2,040 | 25.2 | 15.5 | 16 | 9 | 11 | 13 | 6.8 | 3.5 | 9.2 |
| INSA | 9–12 Feb 2018 | 2,608 | 24.1 | 16.5 | 15 | 10.5 | 11.5 | 13 | 5.4 | 4 | 7.6 |
| INSA | 2–5 Feb 2018 | 2,034 | 24.6 | 17 | 15 | 10 | 11 | 12.5 | 5.9 | 4 | 7.6 |
| INSA | 26–29 Jan 2018 | 2,073 | 26.7 | 17.5 | 14 | 9 | 11 | 11 | 6.8 | 4 | 9.2 |
| INSA | 22 Jan 2018 | 1,169 | 25.6 | 18 | 14 | 10 | 11 | 10 | 5.9 | 5.5 | 7.6 |
| INSA | 12–15 Jan 2018 | 2,000 | 25.4 | 18.5 | 14 | 9.5 | 11.5 | 10 | 6.1 | 5 | 6.9 |
| INSA | 5–8 Jan 2018 | 2,028 | 25.2 | 19.5 | 13.5 | 10 | 11 | 10 | 6.3 | 4.5 | 5.7 |
| INSA | 29 Dec 2017–2 Jan 2018 | 2,012 | 26.9 | 19.5 | 13 | 10 | 11 | 10 | 5.6 | 4 | 7.4 |
| INSA | 21–22 Dec 2017 | 2,203 | 26.9 | 20.5 | 13 | 10.5 | 10 | 9.5 | 6.1 | 4 | 6.4 |
| INSA | 15–18 Dec 2017 | 2,031 | 24.8 | 21 | 14 | 9 | 11 | 10 | 6.2 | 4 | 3.8 |
| INSA | 8–11 Dec 2017 | 2,013 | 25.6 | 22 | 13.5 | 9 | 10.5 | 10.5 | 5.4 | 3 | 3.6 |
| INSA | 1–4 Dec 2017 | 2,063 | 25.0 | 22 | 13 | 10 | 11 | 10 | 6.0 | 3 | 3.0 |
| INSA | 24–27 Nov 2017 | 2,003 | 25.2 | 22 | 13 | 10 | 10 | 10 | 6.8 | 3 | 3.2 |
| INSA | 17–19 Nov 2017 | 2,027 | 24.7 | 21 | 14 | 10 | 11.5 | 9.5 | 6.3 | 3 | 3.7 |
| INSA | 10–13 Nov 2017 | 2,049 | 25.7 | 20 | 13.5 | 10.5 | 10.5 | 9 | 6.3 | 4.5 | 5.7 |
| INSA | 3–6 Nov 2017 | 2,023 | 24.6 | 22 | 13.5 | 10.5 | 10.5 | 8.5 | 6.4 | 4 | 2.6 |
| INSA | 27–28 Oct 2017 | 1,024 | 25.7 | 21 | 13 | 11 | 10 | 10 | 5.3 | 4 | 4.7 |
| INSA | 23 Oct 2017 | 1,002 | 28.1 | 21 | 13 | 10 | 10 | 9 | 4.9 | 4 | 7.1 |
| INSA | 13–16 Oct 2017 | 2,011 | 26.7 | 21.5 | 13 | 10 | 9 | 9.5 | 5.3 | 5 | 5.2 |
| INSA | 6–9 Oct 2017 | 2,015 | 25.7 | 22 | 13 | 11 | 9 | 9 | 6.3 | 4 | 3.7 |
| 2017 federal election | 24 Sep 2017 | – | 26.8 | 20.5 | 12.6 | 10.7 | 9.2 | 8.9 | 6.2 | 5.0 | 6.3 |

=== Scenario polls ===
Armin Laschet as Chancellor Candidate

| Polling firm | Fieldwork date | Sample size | CDU | SPD | AfD | FDP | Linke | Grüne | Others | Lead |
|---|---|---|---|---|---|---|---|---|---|---|
| INSA | 15 Apr 2021 | 1,007 | 27 | 23 | 11 | 10 | 6 | 20 | 3 | 4 |

Markus Söder as Chancellor Candidate

| Polling firm | Fieldwork date | Sample size | CDU | SPD | AfD | FDP | Linke | Grüne | Others | Lead |
|---|---|---|---|---|---|---|---|---|---|---|
| INSA | 15 Apr 2021 | 1,007 | 38 | 19 | 11 | 8 | 5 | 16 | 3 | 19 |

National-wide CSU

| Polling firm | Fieldwork date | Sample size | CDU | SPD | AfD | FDP | Linke | Grüne | CSU | Others | Lead |
|---|---|---|---|---|---|---|---|---|---|---|---|
| INSA | 20 Apr 2021 | 1,000 | 10 | 13 | 11 | 10 | 6 | 22 | 24 | 4 | 2 |
| INSA | 15–18 Jun 2018 | 2,060 | 22 | 17 | 11 | 6 | 12 | 10 | 18 | 4 | 4 |

== By state ==
=== Baden-Württemberg ===
| Polling firm | Fieldwork date | Sample size | CDU | SPD | Grüne | FDP | AfD | Linke | Others | Lead |
|---|---|---|---|---|---|---|---|---|---|---|
| 2021 federal election | 26 Sep 2021 | – | 24.8 | 21.6 | 17.2 | 15.3 | 9.6 | 3.3 | 8.2 | 3.2 |
| Forsa | 29 Jan – 1 Feb 2019 | 1,007 | 33 | 10 | 24 | 10 | 12 | 6 | 5 | 9 |
| Forsa | 8–22 Feb 2018 | 1,003 | 35 | 13 | 17 | 11 | 12 | 8 | 4 | 18 |
| 2017 federal election | 24 Sep 2017 | – | 34.4 | 16.4 | 13.5 | 12.7 | 12.2 | 6.4 | 4.5 | 18.0 |

=== Bavaria ===
| Polling firm | Fieldwork date | Sample size | CSU | SPD | AfD | FDP | Grüne | Linke | Free Voters | Others | Lead |
|---|---|---|---|---|---|---|---|---|---|---|---|
| 2021 federal election | 26 Sep 2021 | – | 31.7 | 18.0 | 9.0 | 10.5 | 14.1 | 2.8 | 7.5 | 6.4 | 13.7 |
| GMS | 13–15 Sep 2021 | 1,002 | 29 | 17 | 11 | 13 | 16 | 5 | 5 | 4 | 12 |
| GMS | 8–13 Sep 2021 | 1,005 | 28 | 18 | 11 | 12 | 17 | 4 | 6 | 4 | 10 |
| Infratest dimap | 2–6 Sep 2021 | 1,195 | 28 | 18 | 10 | 12 | 16 | 3 | 7 | 6 | 10 |
| GMS | 1–6 Sep 2021 | 1,003 | 29 | 15 | 10 | 13 | 18 | 3 | 6 | 6 | 11 |
| GMS | 21–27 Jul 2021 | 1,003 | 35 | 9 | 9 | 12 | 20 | 4 | 7 | 4 | 15 |
| INSA | 12–19 Jul 2021 | 1,000 | 36 | 11 | 9 | 9 | 19 | 4 | 8 | 4 | 17 |
| Infratest dimap | 2–6 Jul 2021 | 1,186 | 36 | 9 | 10 | 11 | 18 | 4 | 6 | 6 | 18 |
| GMS | 16–21 Jun 2021 | 1,007 | 34 | 10 | 9 | 11 | 22 | 3 | 5 | 6 | 12 |
| GMS | 11–17 May 2021 | 1,003 | 32 | 8 | 10 | 11 | 26 | 4 | 4 | 5 | 6 |
| Forsa | 10–17 May 2021 | 1,016 | 32 | 9 | 10 | 9 | 26 | 4 | 4 | 6 | 6 |
| GMS | 20–22 Apr 2021 | 1,001 | 34 | 10 | 10 | 11 | 25 | 5 | 3 | 2 | 9 |
| Forsa | Mar–Apr 2021 | 1,075 | 39 | 10 | 10 | 7 | 22 | 5 | – | 7 | 17 |
| GMS | 27 Nov – 2 Dec 2019 | 1,003 | 35 | 10 | 13 | 8 | 21 | 5 | 3 | 5 | 14 |
| GMS | 18–24 Jun 2019 | 1,005 | 36 | 9 | 11 | 9 | 24 | 4 | 4 | 3 | 12 |
| INSA | 25–27 Jun 2018 | 1,231 | 37 | 14 | 16 | 7 | 13 | 5 | 4 | 4 | 21 |
| Forsa | 21–22 Jun 2018 | 1,033 | 36 | 13 | 15 | 9 | 14 | 7 | – | 6 | 21 |
| Forsa | 8–22 Feb 2018 | 1,027 | 40 | 13 | 12 | 8 | 14 | 6 | – | 7 | 26 |
| GMS | 1–9 Feb 2018 | 1,510 | 39 | 14 | 14 | 8 | 12 | 5 | 3 | 5 | 25 |
| GMS | 27 Dec 2017 – 1 Jan 2018 | 1,007 | 38 | 15 | 14 | 9 | 10 | 5 | 4 | 5 | 23 |
| INSA | 12–13 Dec 2017 | 1,003 | 37 | 15 | 13 | 9 | 12 | 6 | 4 | 4 | 22 |
| GMS | 27–29 Nov 2017 | 1,006 | 36 | 15 | 14 | 9 | 11 | 6 | 4 | 5 | 21 |
| Forsa | 6–9 Nov 2017 | 1,017 | 36 | 15 | 13 | 11 | 12 | 6 | – | 7 | 21 |
| 2017 federal election | 24 Sep 2017 | – | 38.8 | 15.3 | 12.4 | 10.2 | 9.8 | 6.1 | 2.7 | 4.8 | 23.5 |

=== Berlin ===
| Polling firm | Fieldwork date | Sample size | CDU | Linke | SPD | Grüne | AfD | FDP | Others | Lead |
|---|---|---|---|---|---|---|---|---|---|---|
| 2021 federal election | 11 Feb 2024 | – | 17.2 | 11.5 | 22.2 | 22.0 | 9.4 | 8.1 | 9.6 | 0.2 |
| Forsa | 29 Jan – 6 Feb 2020 | 1,001 | 21 | 16 | 12 | 26 | 10 | 6 | 9 | 5 |
| Forsa | 12–19 Dec 2019 | 1,005 | 21 | 16 | 13 | 24 | 10 | 7 | 9 | 3 |
| Forsa | 21–26 Nov 2019 | 1,006 | 20 | 16 | 14 | 24 | 11 | 7 | 8 | 4 |
| Forsa | 22–31 Oct 2019 | 1,002 | 22 | 15 | 13 | 24 | 11 | 6 | 9 | 2 |
| Forsa | 17–26 Sep 2019 | 1,002 | 22 | 15 | 13 | 24 | 11 | 7 | 8 | 2 |
| Forsa | 20–29 Aug 2019 | 1,003 | 22 | 17 | 14 | 24 | 10 | 7 | 8 | 2 |
| Forsa | 17–25 Jul 2019 | 1,001 | 22 | 17 | 14 | 24 | 10 | 6 | 7 | 2 |
| Forsa | 17–27 Jun 2019 | 1,004 | 21 | 16 | 14 | 24 | 11 | 7 | 7 | 3 |
| Forsa | 20–27 May 2019 | 1,006 | 19 | 16 | 14 | 25 | 12 | 7 | 7 | 6 |
| Forsa | 16–25 Apr 2019 | 1,005 | 20 | 16 | 14 | 24 | 13 | 7 | 6 | 4 |
| Forsa | 19–28 Mar 2019 | 1,003 | 21 | 16 | 13 | 24 | 12 | 8 | 6 | 3 |
| Forsa | 20–28 Feb 2019 | 1,001 | 24 | 15 | 13 | 23 | 12 | 7 | 6 | 1 |
| Forsa | 22–31 Jan 2019 | 1,002 | 23 | 17 | 12 | 23 | 12 | 7 | 6 | Tie |
| Forsa | 11–19 Dec 2018 | 1,009 | 21 | 16 | 13 | 23 | 14 | 8 | 5 | 2 |
| Forsa | 19–29 Nov 2018 | 1,003 | 19 | 17 | 12 | 25 | 15 | 8 | 4 | 6 |
| Forsa | Oct 2018 | 1,005 | 18 | 18 | 12 | 26 | 14 | 8 | 4 | 8 |
| Forsa | 19–27 Sep 2018 | 1,005 | 19 | 20 | 14 | 22 | 15 | 7 | 3 | 2 |
| Forsa | 21–30 Aug 2018 | 1,004 | 21 | 19 | 15 | 20 | 15 | 6 | 4 | 1 |
| Forsa | 16–26 Jul 2018 | 1,009 | 21 | 20 | 15 | 18 | 15 | 7 | 4 | 1 |
| Forsa | 20–28 Jun 2018 | 1,009 | 21 | 19 | 17 | 18 | 13 | 8 | 4 | 2 |
| Forsa | 22–31 May 2018 | 1,004 | 23 | 19 | 16 | 18 | 12 | 8 | 4 | 4 |
| Forsa | 17–26 Apr 2018 | 1,001 | 23 | 19 | 17 | 16 | 12 | 8 | 5 | 4 |
| Forsa | 19–28 Mar 2018 | 1,003 | 23 | 20 | 17 | 15 | 13 | 8 | 4 | 3 |
| Forsa | 12–22 Feb 2018 | 1,006 | 25 | 19 | 17 | 15 | 11 | 8 | 5 | 6 |
| Forsa | 15–25 Jan 2018 | 1,008 | 24 | 19 | 18 | 15 | 11 | 7 | 6 | 5 |
| Forsa | 12–21 Dec 2017 | 1,002 | 24 | 19 | 18 | 15 | 11 | 6 | 7 | 5 |
| Forsa | 13–23 Nov 2017 | 1,002 | 23 | 18 | 19 | 14 | 11 | 8 | 7 | 4 |
| Forsa | 17–26 Oct 2017 | 1,011 | 23 | 18 | 20 | 13 | 11 | 9 | 6 | 3 |
| 2017 federal election | 24 Sep 2017 | – | 22.7 | 18.8 | 17.9 | 12.6 | 12.0 | 8.9 | 7.1 | 3.9 |

=== Brandenburg ===
| Polling firm | Fieldwork date | Sample size | CDU | AfD | SPD | Linke | FDP | Grüne | Others | Lead |
|---|---|---|---|---|---|---|---|---|---|---|
| 2021 federal election | 26 Sep 2021 | – | 15.3 | 18.1 | 29.5 | 8.5 | 9.3 | 9.0 | 10.3 | 11.4 |
| Infratest dimap | 25–28 Aug 2021 | 1,157 | 15 | 18 | 29 | 11 | 9 | 9 | 9 | 11 |
| Forsa | 10–15 Dec 2020 | 1,001 | 28 | 17 | 15 | 12 | 4 | 17 | 7 | 11 |
| Forsa | 17–20 Dec 2018 | 1,005 | 23 | 20 | 12 | 18 | 7 | 14 | 6 | 3 |
| Forsa | 7–9 Nov 2017 | 1,002 | 26 | 20 | 16 | 19 | 8 | 6 | 5 | 6 |
| 2017 federal election | 24 Sep 2017 | – | 26.7 | 20.2 | 17.6 | 17.2 | 7.1 | 5.0 | 6.3 | 6.5 |

=== Hamburg ===
| Polling firm | Fieldwork date | Sample size | CDU | SPD | Grüne | Linke | FDP | AfD | Others | Lead |
|---|---|---|---|---|---|---|---|---|---|---|
| 2021 federal election | 26 Sep 2021 | – | 15.5 | 29.7 | 24.9 | 6.7 | 11.4 | 5.0 | 6.8 | 4.8 |
| Trend Research | 13–16 Sep 2021 | 703 | 14 | 33 | 18 | 9 | 14 | 7 | 5 | 15 |
| Trend Research | 30 Aug–2 Sep 2021 | 708 | 15 | 34 | 17 | 10 | 13 | 7 | 5 | 17 |
| Trend Research | 12–18 Aug 2021 | 702 | 17 | 28 | 19 | 9 | 14 | 7 | 6 | 9 |
| Forsa | 18 Dec 2019–6 Jan 2020 | 1,069 | 21 | 16 | 29 | 11 | 8 | 9 | 6 | 8 |
| Universität Hamburg | 6 Jan–2 Mar 2019 | 1,069 | 20 | 24 | 32 | 8 | 10 | 3 | 3 | 8 |
| Forsa | 27 Dec 2018–3 Jan 2019 | 1,004 | 22 | 17 | 26 | 11 | 10 | 9 | 5 | 4 |
| 2017 federal election | 24 Sep 2017 | – | 27.2 | 23.5 | 13.9 | 12.2 | 10.8 | 7.8 | 4.5 | 3.7 |

=== Hesse ===
| Polling firm | Fieldwork date | Sample size | CDU | SPD | AfD | FDP | Grüne | Linke | Others | Lead |
|---|---|---|---|---|---|---|---|---|---|---|
| 2021 federal election | 26 Sep 2021 | – | 22.8 | 27.6 | 8.8 | 12.8 | 15.8 | 4.3 | 7.9 | 4.8 |
| Forsa | 8–22 Feb 2018 | 1,035 | 31 | 19 | 10 | 12 | 14 | 10 | 4 | 12 |
| 2017 federal election | 24 Sep 2017 | – | 30.9 | 23.5 | 11.9 | 11.5 | 9.7 | 8.1 | 4.4 | 7.3 |

=== Mecklenburg-Vorpommern ===
| Polling firm | Fieldwork date | Sample size | CDU | AfD | Linke | SPD | FDP | Grüne | Others | Lead |
|---|---|---|---|---|---|---|---|---|---|---|
| 2021 federal election | 26 Sep 2021 | – | 17.4 | 18.0 | 11.1 | 29.1 | 8.2 | 7.8 | 8.4 | 11.7 |
| INSA | 10–16 Sep 2021 | 1,000 | 14 | 19 | 11 | 38 | 6 | 9 | 3 | 19 |
| Infratest dimap | 2–7 Sep 2021 | 1,180 | 16 | 18 | 11 | 31 | 9 | 8 | 7 | 13 |
| Infratest dimap | 19–24 Aug 2021 | 1,153 | 19 | 18 | 12 | 29 | 9 | 7 | 6 | 10 |
| INSA | 6–12 Aug 2021 | 1,000 | 21 | 18 | 12 | 25 | 8 | 10 | 7 | 4 |
| INSA | 16–22 Jul 2021 | 1,098 | 26 | 21 | 13 | 17 | 8 | 11 | 4 | 5 |
| Infratest dimap | 8–13 Jul 2021 | 1,159 | 30 | 17 | 13 | 17 | 8 | 8 | 7 | 13 |
| Infratest dimap | 12–18 May 2021 | 1,245 | 23 | 16 | 12 | 18 | 7 | 16 | 7 | 5 |
| Forsa | 12–15 Jan 2021 | 1,002 | 32 | 15 | 16 | 12 | 5 | 13 | 7 | 16 |
| Infratest dimap | 18–21 Nov 2020 | 1,000 | 34 | 15 | 12 | 20 | 4 | 10 | 5 | 14 |
| Forsa | 2–10 Jan 2020 | 1,002 | 27 | 20 | 16 | 8 | 6 | 14 | 9 | 7 |
| Forsa | 18–23 Sep 2019 | 1,002 | 28 | 21 | 14 | 10 | 6 | 14 | 7 | 7 |
| Forsa | 4–11 Jan 2019 | 1,007 | 32 | 20 | 16 | 11 | 5 | 11 | 5 | 12 |
| Forsa | 24–28 Jun 2018 | 1,002 | 30 | 21 | 19 | 12 | 5 | 8 | 5 | 9 |
| Forsa | 2–11 Jan 2018 | 1,001 | 33 | 18 | 18 | 15 | 5 | 6 | 5 | 15 |
| 2017 federal election | 24 Sep 2017 | – | 33.1 | 18.6 | 17.8 | 15.1 | 6.2 | 4.3 | 4.9 | 14.5 |

=== Lower Saxony ===
| Polling firm | Fieldwork date | Sample size | CDU | SPD | FDP | AfD | Grüne | Linke | Others | Lead |
|---|---|---|---|---|---|---|---|---|---|---|
| 2021 federal election | 26 Sep 2021 | – | 24.2 | 33.1 | 10.5 | 7.4 | 16.1 | 3.3 | 5.4 | 8.9 |
| Forsa | 19–28 May 2020 | 1,002 | 40 | 20 | 5 | 7 | 16 | 6 | 6 | 20 |
| Forsa | 1–8 Feb 2019 | 1,010 | 33 | 19 | 8 | 9 | 19 | 7 | 5 | 14 |
| Forsa | 8–22 Feb 2018 | 1,004 | 36 | 24 | 9 | 8 | 12 | 7 | 4 | 12 |
| 2017 federal election | 24 Sep 2017 | – | 34.9 | 27.4 | 9.3 | 9.1 | 8.7 | 7.0 | 3.6 | 7.5 |

=== North Rhine-Westphalia ===
| Polling firm | Fieldwork date | Sample size | CDU | SPD | FDP | AfD | Grüne | Linke | Others | Lead |
|---|---|---|---|---|---|---|---|---|---|---|
| 2021 federal election | 26 Sep 2021 | – | 26.0 | 29.1 | 11.4 | 7.3 | 16.1 | 3.7 | 6.5 | 3.1 |
| Forsa | 10–17 May 2021 | 1,058 | 24 | 18 | 11 | 8 | 28 | 4 | 7 | 4 |
| Forsa | Mar–Apr 2021 | 1,090 | 26 | 18 | 11 | 8 | 25 | 6 | 6 | 1 |
| Forsa | 1–16 Aug 2019 | 1,505 | 27 | 17 | 10 | 9 | 25 | 6 | 6 | 2 |
| Forsa | 8–22 Feb 2018 | 1,015 | 34 | 21 | 11 | 9 | 11 | 8 | 6 | 13 |
| 2017 federal election | 24 Sep 2017 | – | 32.6 | 26.0 | 13.1 | 9.4 | 7.6 | 7.5 | 3.8 | 6.7 |

=== Rhineland-Palatinate ===
| Polling firm | Fieldwork date | Sample size | CDU | SPD | AfD | FDP | Grüne | Linke | Free Voters | Others | Lead |
|---|---|---|---|---|---|---|---|---|---|---|---|
| 2021 federal election | 26 Sep 2021 | – | 24.7 | 29.4 | 9.2 | 11.7 | 12.6 | 3.3 | 3.6 | 5.6 | 4.7 |
| Infratest dimap | 2–7 Sep 2021 | 1,160 | 23 | 30 | 10 | 11 | 13 | 4 | 4 | 5 | 7 |
| Infratest dimap | 9–13 Jul 2021 | 1,153 | 30 | 22 | 11 | 9 | 17 | 4 | 3 | 4 | 8 |
| Forsa | 1–8 Feb 2019 | 1,005 | 34 | 16 | 10 | 10 | 18 | 7 | – | 5 | 16 |
| Infratest dimap | 5–7 Mar 2018 | 1,001 | 34 | 23 | 12 | 9 | 12 | 7 | – | 3 | 11 |
| Infratest dimap | 8–12 Dec 2017 | 1,003 | 39 | 24 | 9 | 8 | 12 | 5 | – | 3 | 15 |
| 2017 federal election | 24 Sep 2017 | – | 35.9 | 24.2 | 11.2 | 10.4 | 7.6 | 6.8 | 1.4 | 2.5 | 11.7 |

=== Saxony ===
| Polling firm | Fieldwork date | Sample size | AfD | CDU | Linke | SPD | FDP | Grüne | Others | Lead |
|---|---|---|---|---|---|---|---|---|---|---|
| 2021 federal election | 26 Sep 2021 | – | 24.6 | 17.2 | 9.3 | 19.3 | 11.0 | 8.6 | 9.9 | 5.3 |
| INSA | 6–13 Sep 2021 | 1,000 | 26 | 18 | 11 | 18 | 11 | 8 | 8 | 8 |
| Infratest dimap | 13–18 Aug 2021 | 1,179 | 23 | 21 | 11 | 15 | 12 | 10 | 8 | 2 |
| INSA | 2–9 Aug 2021 | 1,001 | 25 | 24 | 13 | 10 | 11 | 10 | 7 | 1 |
| 2017 federal election | 24 Sep 2017 | – | 27.0 | 26.9 | 16.1 | 10.5 | 8.2 | 4.6 | 6.7 | 0.1 |

=== Thuringia ===
| Polling firm | Fieldwork date | Sample size | CDU | AfD | Linke | SPD | FDP | Grüne | Others | Lead |
|---|---|---|---|---|---|---|---|---|---|---|
| 2021 federal election | 26 Sep 2021 | – | 16.9 | 24.0 | 11.4 | 23.4 | 9.0 | 6.6 | 8.7 | 0.6 |
| INSA | 16–23 Aug 2021 | 1,000 | 18 | 22 | 18 | 21 | 9 | 5 | 7 | 1 |
| 2017 federal election | 24 Sep 2017 | – | 28.8 | 22.7 | 16.9 | 13.2 | 7.8 | 4.1 | 6.5 | 6.1 |

== By West and East Germany ==
=== West Germany ===
| Polling firm | Fieldwork date | Sample size | CDU | SPD | FDP | AfD | Grüne | Linke | Others | Lead |
|---|---|---|---|---|---|---|---|---|---|---|
| 2021 federal election | 2021 | – | 25.6 | 26.1 | 11.9 | 8.2 | 15.9 | 3.7 | 8.6 | 0.5 |
| INSA-S | 28.08.2021 | – | 22 | 25 | 14 | 10 | 18 | 5 | 6 | 3 |
| YouGov | 02.07.2021 | – | 31 | 16 | 11 | 10 | 20 | 5 | 6 | 11 |
| Forsa | 02.06.2021 | – | 25 | 15 | 15 | 7 | 26 | 4 | 8 | 1 |
| YouGov | 27.05.2021 | – | 28 | 16 | 12 | 9 | 24 | 5 | 6 | 4 |
| YouGov | 29.04.2021 | – | 25 | 16 | 11 | 9 | 27 | 6 | 7 | 2 |
| YouGov | 01.04.2021 | – | 28 | 17 | 11 | 10 | 22 | 6 | 5 | 6 |
| YouGov | 26.02.2021 | – | 35 | 17 | 8 | 9 | 19 | 5 | 6 | 16 |
| YouGov | 04.02.2021 | – | 38 | 17 | 7 | 9 | 19 | 7 | 4 | 19 |
| YouGov | 06.01.2021 | – | 38 | 16 | 7 | 8 | 19 | 8 | 5 | 19 |
| YouGov | 26.11.2020 | – | 38 | 17 | 6 | 9 | 19 | 7 | 5 | 19 |
| YouGov | 30.10.2020 | – | 37 | 16 | 6 | 10 | 19 | 7 | 5 | 18 |
| YouGov | 25.09.2020 | – | 37 | 16 | 5 | 10 | 19 | 7 | 6 | 18 |
| YouGov | 28.08.2020 | – | 38 | 17 | 5 | 9 | 19 | 7 | 5 | 19 |
| YouGov | 06.08.2020 | – | 38 | 15 | 6 | 10 | 19 | 7 | 6 | 19 |
| | 18.07.2020 | – | 39 | 14 | 7 | 7 | 20 | 6 | 7 | 19 |
| | 25.04.2020 | – | 40 | 17 | 6 | 7 | 17 | 6 | 7 | 23 |
| | 10.08.2019 | – | 27 | 14 | 9 | 12 | 24 | 8 | 6 | 3 |
| | 03.08.2019 | – | 27 | 13 | 9 | 12 | 25 | 7 | 7 | 2 |
| | 01.08.2019 | – | 27 | 13 | 9 | 12 | 28 | 5 | 6 | 1 |
| | 13.07.2019 | – | 27 | 14 | 8 | 10 | 27 | 6 | 8 | 0 |
| | 20.04.2019 | – | 29 | 19 | 9 | 11 | 20 | 7 | 5 | 9 |
| | 15.09.2018 | – | 31 | 19 | 10 | 13 | 14 | 8 | 5 | 13 |
| | 08.09.2018 | – | 30 | 18 | 9 | 13 | 15 | 9 | 6 | 12 |
| | 06.09.2018 | – | 30 | 19 | 9 | 14 | 15 | 8 | 5 | 11 |
| | 23.07.2018 | – | 29 | 20 | 10 | 16 | 12 | 10 | 3 | 9 |
| 2017 federal election | 24 Sep 2017 | – | 34.1 | 21.9 | 11.4 | 10.7 | 9.8 | 7.4 | 4.7 | 12 |

=== East Germany ===
| Polling firm | Fieldwork date | Sample size | CDU | AfD | Linke | SPD | FDP | Grüne | Others | Lead |
|---|---|---|---|---|---|---|---|---|---|---|
| 2021 federal election | 2021 | – | 16.8 | 20.5 | 10.4 | 24.1 | 9.5 | 9.2 | 9.5 | 4 |
| INSA-S | 28.08.2021 | – | 17 | 15 | 10 | 21 | 10 | 15 | 12 | 10 |
| YouGov | 02.07.2021 | – | 25 | 15 | 13 | 11 | 12 | 14 | 9 | 10 |
| Forsa | 02.06.2021 | – | 23 | 21 | 13 | 12 | 10 | 12 | 9 | 2 |
| YouGov | 27.05.2021 | – | 20 | 17 | 13 | 12 | 10 | 16 | 11 | 4 |
| YouGov | 29.04.2021 | – | 21 | 17 | 16 | 8 | 11 | 18 | 8 | 4 |
| YouGov | 01.04.2021 | – | 21 | 17 | 15 | 15 | 6 | 17 | 9 | 4 |
| YouGov | 26.02.2021 | – | 26 | 18 | 18 | 10 | 7 | 13 | 8 | 8 |
| YouGov | 04.02.2021 | – | 28 | 15 | 19 | 9 | 6 | 14 | 9 | 13 |
| YouGov | 06.01.2021 | – | 29 | 18 | 15 | 12 | 3 | 15 | 8 | 11 |
| YouGov | 26.11.2020 | – | 34 | 14 | 19 | 9 | 6 | 13 | 6 | 20 |
| YouGov | 30.10.2020 | – | 29 | 21 | 15 | 11 | 5 | 13 | 7 | 8 |
| Cantar | 03.10.2020 | – | 30 | 18 | 19 | 13 | 5 | 9 | 6 | 12 |
| YouGov | 25.09.2020 | – | 29 | 19 | 18 | 11 | 5 | 12 | 7 | 10 |
| YouGov | 28.08.2020 | – | 28 | 19 | 13 | 11 | 5 | 14 | 9 | 9 |
| YouGov | 06.08.2020 | – | 28 | 17 | 16 | 12 | 6 | 14 | 7 | 11 |
| Forsa | 18.07.2020 | – | 33 | 19 | 16 | 13 | 4 | 9 | 6 | 14 |
| Forsa | 25.04.2020 | – | 33 | 19 | 17 | 14 | 3 | 6 | 8 | 14 |
| Emnid-News | 10.08.2019 | – | 22 | 24 | 16 | 12 | 7 | 11 | 8 | 2 |
| Emnid-Emnid | 03.08.2019 | – | 22 | 23 | 14 | 11 | 7 | 13 | 10 | 1 |
| Infratest dimap | 01.08.2019 | – | 23 | 22 | 15 | 11 | 6 | 15 | 8 | 1 |
| Forsa | 13.07.2019 | – | 23 | 23 | 17 | 9 | 5 | 15 | 8 | 0 |
| Emnid-Emnid | 20.04.2019 | – | 22 | 23 | 18 | 14 | 5 | 12 | 6 | 1 |
| Forsa | 15.12.2018 | – | 29 | 26 | 16 | 8 | 6 | 9 | 6 | 3 |
| Emnid-Emnid | 22.09.2018 | – | 22 | 27 | 18 | 13 | 8 | 8 | 4 | 5 |
| Emnid-Emnid | 22.09.2018 | – | 22 | 26 | 18 | 15 | 7 | 7 | 5 | 4 |
| Emnid-Emnid | 15.09.2018 | – | 24 | 25 | 18 | 14 | 7 | 6 | 6 | 1 |
| Emnid-Emnid | 08.09.2018 | – | 25 | 24 | 17 | 14 | 7 | 7 | 6 | 1 |
| Infratest dimap | 06.09.2018 | – | 23 | 27 | 18 | 15 | 6 | 7 | 4 | 4 |
| INSA-S | 23.07.2018 | – | 27 | 23 | 17 | 12 | 7 | 9 | 5 | 4 |
| Emnid-News | 17.02.2018 | – | 26 | 25 | - | 14 | - | - | - | 1 |
| 2017 federal election | 24 Sep 2017 | – | 27.6 | 21.9 | 17.8 | 13.9 | 7.5 | 5.0 | 6.3 | 6.1 |

== Preferred coalition ==
| Polling firm | Fieldwork date | Sample size | SPD Union | Union FDP | SPD Grüne | Union Grüne | SPD Grüne Linke | Union Grüne FDP | SPD Union FDP | SPD Grüne FDP | SPD FDP |
|---|---|---|---|---|---|---|---|---|---|---|---|
| Forschungsgruppe Wahlen | 14–16 Sep 2021 | 1,406 | 9 | 8 | 17 | 5 | 9 | 5 | 5 | 7 | – |
| Forschungsgruppe Wahlen | 7–9 Sep 2021 | 1,281 | 9 | 7 | 17 | 4 | 10 | 4 | 6 | 6 | – |
| Forschungsgruppe Wahlen | 31 Aug–2 Sep 2021 | 1,301 | 12 | 8 | 15 | 5 | 7 | 3 | 4 | 5 | – |
| Forschungsgruppe Wahlen | 24–26 Aug 2021 | 1,300 | 10 | 6 | 15 | 7 | 7 | 4 | 6 | 5 | – |
| Forschungsgruppe Wahlen | 10–12 Aug 2021 | 1,252 | 12 | 10 | 13 | 9 | 6 | 4 | 6 | 3 | – |
| Forschungsgruppe Wahlen | 27–29 Jul 2021 | 1,268 | 13 | 10 | 11 | 13 | 6 | 3 | 5 | 3 | – |
| Forschungsgruppe Wahlen | 13–15 Jul 2021 | 1,224 | 13 | 11 | 10 | 13 | 6 | 4 | 6 | 2 | – |
| Forschungsgruppe Wahlen | 22–24 Jun 2021 | 1,271 | 11 | 11 | 11 | 14 | 7 | 4 | 4 | 3 | – |
| Civey | 8–9 Jun 2021 | 5,005 | 6 | – | – | 12 | 16 | 11 | 21 | 10 | – |
| Forschungsgruppe Wahlen | 7–9 Jun 2021 | 1,232 | 12 | 14 | 9 | 15 | 5 | 4 | 4 | 1 | – |
| Forschungsgruppe Wahlen | 18–20 May 2021 | 1,229 | 11 | 11 | 13 | 16 | 6 | 4 | 2 | 3 | – |
| Forschungsgruppe Wahlen | 4–6 May 2021 | 1,271 | 9 | 7 | 13 | 20 | 6 | 3 | 1 | 3 | – |
| Forschungsgruppe Wahlen | 13–15 Apr 2021 | 1,292 | 12 | 9 | 12 | 20 | 6 | 3 | 1 | 3 | – |
| Forschungsgruppe Wahlen | 23–25 Mar 2021 | 1,030 | 8 | 6 | 12 | 17 | 5 | 3 | 2 | 6 | – |
| Forschungsgruppe Wahlen | 23–25 Feb 2021 | 1,202 | 17 | 9 | 10 | 19 | 6 | 1 | 1 | 1 | – |
| Forschungsgruppe Wahlen | 25–27 Jan 2021 | 1,371 | 15 | 9 | 11 | 22 | 6 | 3 | – | 1 | – |
| Forschungsgruppe Wahlen | 12–14 Jan 2021 | 1,262 | 16 | 8 | 11 | 20 | 6 | 2 | 1 | 1 | – |
| Forschungsgruppe Wahlen | 7–9 Dec 2020 | 1,246 | 19 | 7 | 11 | 17 | 6 | 1 | – | – | – |
| Forschungsgruppe Wahlen | 24–26 Nov 2020 | 1,330 | 15 | 7 | 15 | 20 | 7 | 3 | – | – | – |
| Forschungsgruppe Wahlen | 10-12 Nov 2020 | 1,347 | 18 | 8 | 13 | 21 | 5 | 2 | – | – | – |
| Forschungsgruppe Wahlen | 20-22 Oct 2020 | 1,297 | 15 | 7 | 12 | 21 | 6 | 2 | – | – | – |
| Forschungsgruppe Wahlen | 6–8 Oct 2020 | 1,229 | 14 | 7 | 11 | 21 | 6 | 3 | – | – | – |
| Forschungsgruppe Wahlen | 14–16 Sep 2020 | 1,241 | 15 | 6 | 11 | 24 | 7 | 2 | – | – | – |
| Forschungsgruppe Wahlen | 25–27 Aug 2020 | 1,303 | 16 | 7 | 12 | 18 | 8 | 2 | – | – | – |
| Forschungsgruppe Wahlen | 28–30 Jul 2020 | 1,249 | 16 | 6 | 13 | 18 | 6 | 2 | – | – | – |
| Forschungsgruppe Wahlen | 7–9 Jul 2020 | 1,226 | 20 | 8 | 11 | 19 | 4 | 2 | – | – | – |
| Forschungsgruppe Wahlen | 23–25 Jun 2020 | 1,227 | 19 | 8 | 9 | 21 | 5 | 2 | – | – | – |
| Forschungsgruppe Wahlen | 8–10 Jun 2020 | 1,270 | 20 | 8 | 11 | 15 | 6 | 1 | – | – | – |
| Forschungsgruppe Wahlen | 26–28 May 2020 | 1,377 | 20 | 8 | 10 | 17 | 5 | 1 | – | – | – |
| Forschungsgruppe Wahlen | 12–14 May 2020 | 1,282 | 17 | 9 | 9 | 19 | 4 | 2 | – | – | – |
| Forschungsgruppe Wahlen | 20–23 Apr 2020 | 1,323 | 20 | 7 | 10 | 18 | 5 | 2 | – | – | – |
| Forschungsgruppe Wahlen | 23–26 Mar 2020 | 1,473 | 16 | 7 | 11 | 18 | 6 | 3 | – | – | – |
| Forschungsgruppe Wahlen | 3–5 Mar 2020 | 1,276 | 12 | 7 | 14 | 17 | 8 | 2 | – | – | – |
| Forschungsgruppe Wahlen | 4–6 Feb 2020 | 1,067 | 8 | 7 | 13 | 19 | 7 | 4 | – | – | – |
| Forschungsgruppe Wahlen | 13–15 Jan 2020 | 1,282 | 8 | 7 | 13 | 18 | 8 | 4 | – | – | – |
| Forschungsgruppe Wahlen | 10–12 Dec 2019 | 1,366 | 9 | 8 | 10 | 16 | 7 | 5 | – | – | 1 |
| Forschungsgruppe Wahlen | 26–28 Nov 2019 | 1,340 | 9 | 9 | 11 | 13 | 7 | 4 | – | – | 1 |
| Forschungsgruppe Wahlen | 5–7 Nov 2019 | 1,264 | 9 | 8 | 10 | 13 | 7 | 4 | – | – | – |
| Forschungsgruppe Wahlen | 15–17 Oct 2019 | 1,226 | 10 | 8 | 11 | 17 | 6 | 3 | – | – | 1 |
| Forschungsgruppe Wahlen | 24–26 Sep 2019 | 1,325 | 9 | 6 | 10 | 19 | 6 | 4 | – | – | – |
| Forschungsgruppe Wahlen | 2–4 Sep 2019 | 1,270 | 10 | 7 | 13 | 14 | 7 | 4 | – | – | 1 |
| Forschungsgruppe Wahlen | 6–8 Aug 2019 | 1,307 | 8 | 7 | 11 | 17 | 6 | 3 | – | – | 1 |
| Forschungsgruppe Wahlen | 16–18 Jul 2019 | 1,290 | 8 | 9 | 10 | 16 | 7 | 5 | – | – | 1 |
| Forschungsgruppe Wahlen | 17–19 Jun 2019 | 1,291 | 6 | 6 | 11 | 19 | 9 | 4 | – | – | 1 |
| Forschungsgruppe Wahlen | 3–5 Jun 2019 | 1,297 | 9 | 6 | 11 | 19 | 6 | 7 | – | – | – |
| Forschungsgruppe Wahlen | 7–9 May 2019 | 1,357 | 11 | 10 | 13 | 14 | 6 | 3 | – | – | 2 |
| Forschungsgruppe Wahlen | 9–11 Apr 2019 | 1,282 | 11 | 8 | 15 | 15 | 5 | 3 | – | – | 2 |
| Forschungsgruppe Wahlen | 25–27 Mar 2019 | 1,325 | 10 | 11 | 12 | 14 | 5 | 4 | – | – | 1 |
| Forschungsgruppe Wahlen | 12–14 Mar 2019 | 1,290 | 13 | 12 | 12 | 12 | 5 | 4 | – | – | 1 |
| Forschungsgruppe Wahlen | 19–21 Feb 2019 | 1,226 | 13 | 11 | 12 | 13 | 5 | 5 | – | – | 2 |
| Forschungsgruppe Wahlen | 5–7 Feb 2019 | 1,350 | 12 | 11 | 12 | 14 | 5 | 4 | – | – | 1 |
| Forschungsgruppe Wahlen | 22–24 Jan 2019 | 1,285 | 11 | 9 | 12 | 15 | 4 | 6 | – | – | 2 |
| Forschungsgruppe Wahlen | 8–10 Jan 2019 | 1,267 | 11 | 9 | 10 | 14 | 4 | 7 | – | – | 2 |
| Forschungsgruppe Wahlen | 11–13 Dec 2018 | 1,268 | 11 | 10 | 13 | 15 | 4 | 5 | – | – | 1 |
| Forschungsgruppe Wahlen | 20–22 Nov 2018 | 1,336 | 8 | 9 | 12 | 15 | 5 | 4 | – | – | 1 |
| Forschungsgruppe Wahlen | 6–8 Nov 2018 | 1,200 | 10 | 9 | 12 | 15 | 7 | 5 | – | – | 1 |
| Forschungsgruppe Wahlen | 16–18 Oct 2018 | 1,117 | 5 | 9 | 13 | 14 | 5 | 5 | – | – | 1 |
| Forschungsgruppe Wahlen | 25–27 Sep 2018 | 1,260 | 11 | 7 | 10 | 8 | 5 | 6 | – | – | 3 |
| Forschungsgruppe Wahlen | 11–13 Sep 2018 | 1,339 | 15 | 8 | 11 | 7 | 8 | 4 | – | – | 2 |
| Forschungsgruppe Wahlen | 28–30 Aug 2018 | 1,216 | 16 | 11 | 8 | 7 | 6 | 4 | – | – | 1 |
| Forschungsgruppe Wahlen | 7–9 Aug 2018 | 1,294 | 13 | 8 | 9 | 9 | 6 | 5 | – | – | 1 |
| Forschungsgruppe Wahlen | 9–12 Jul 2018 | 1,340 | 14 | 9 | 10 | 6 | 6 | 5 | – | – | 2 |
| Forschungsgruppe Wahlen | 25–28 Jun 2018 | 1,290 | 14 | 11 | 9 | 6 | 6 | 5 | – | – | 1 |
| Forschungsgruppe Wahlen | 5–7 Jun 2018 | 1,284 | 18 | 10 | 10 | 6 | 4 | 6 | – | – | 2 |
| Forschungsgruppe Wahlen | 15–17 May 2018 | 1,200 | 19 | 9 | 9 | 8 | 4 | 6 | – | – | 2 |
| Forschungsgruppe Wahlen | 24–26 Apr 2018 | 1,285 | 16 | 10 | 10 | 7 | 5 | 5 | – | – | 2 |
| Forschungsgruppe Wahlen | 10–12 Apr 2018 | 1,159 | 14 | 13 | 11 | 9 | 4 | 5 | – | – | 2 |
| Forschungsgruppe Wahlen | 13–15 Mar 2018 | 1,214 | 18 | 13 | 10 | 5 | 5 | 5 | – | – | 2 |

== See also ==
- Opinion polling for the 2025 German federal election
- Opinion polling for the 2017 German federal election
- Opinion polling for the 2013 German federal election
