= List of female members of the European Parliament for Croatia =

This is a list of women who are or have been members of the European Parliament for Croatia.

== Overview ==
In 2013, when Croatia first elected MEPs, 6 of the 12 elected were women.

In November 2018, Biljana Borzan was appointed as the European Parliament's rapporteur on women's rights in the Western Balkans in order to help women in Croatia.

At the 2019 European Parliament election, Europe overall was said to have poor gender representation of MEPs elected, in Croatia 6 of the 12 MEPs elected were women.

President of the European Commission, Ursula von der Leyen appointed three women from Balkan countries to her commission as part of scheme to promote women, one of which was Dubravka Suica, to serve as the vice-president for Democracy and Demography.

Croatia uses gender quotas in their elections to the European Parliament, and have been praised for their gender representation among elected politicians.

== List ==
Image	Name	National party	EP Group	First elected	Year left	Ref.
	Biljana Borzan	Social Democratic Party	S&D	2013	Incumbent	
	Zdravka Bušić	Croatian Democratic Union	EPP	2013	2014	
	Ivana Maletić	Croatian Democratic Union	EPP	2013	2019	
	Sandra Petrović Jakovina	Social Democratic Party	S&D	2013	2014	
	Dubravka Šuica	Croatian Democratic Union	EPP	2013	2019 (Note: Resigned to become a European Commissioner in the Von der Leyen Commission.)	
	Ruža Tomašić	Party of Rights dr. Ante Starčević (until 2014); Croatian Conservative Party (from 2015)	ECR	2013	2021 (Note: Resigned and was replaced by Vladislav Ilčić.)	
	Marijana Petir	None	EPP	2014	2019	
	Željana Zovko	Croatian Democratic Union	EPP	2016 (Note: Elected after Ivan Tepeš refused to take his seat.)	Incumbent	
	Sunčana Glavak	Croatian Democratic Union	EPP	2019	Incumbent	
	Romana Jerković	Social Democratic Party	S&D	2020 (Note: Won the seat after Croatia gained one more seat because of Brexit.)	Incumbent	
	Nikolina Brnjac	Croatian Democratic Union	EPP	2024	Incumbent	

== See also ==
- Women in Croatia
- Croatia (European Parliament constituency)
