= List of members of the European Parliament for Croatia, 2024–2029 =

This is a list of the 12 members of the European Parliament for Croatia in the 2024 to 2029 session. The members were elected in the 2024 European Parliament election in Croatia.

== List ==
Name	National party	EP Group	Preference votes	Ref
Davor Ivo Stier	Croatian Democratic Union (HDZ)	EPP	25,424	
Nikolina Brnjac	Croatian Democratic Union (HDZ)	EPP	7,734	
Željana Zovko	Croatian Democratic Union (HDZ)	EPP	6,707	
Karlo Ressler	Croatian Democratic Union (HDZ)	EPP	6,273	
Sunčana Glavak (Note: Andrej Plenković was elected but refused to take his seat.)	Croatian Democratic Union (HDZ)	EPP	4,840	
Tomislav Sokol (Note: Dubravka Šuica was elected but refused to take her seat to become a European commissioner.)	Croatian Democratic Union (HDZ)	EPP	2,454	
Biljana Borzan	Social Democratic Party (SDP)	S&D	83,656	
Tonino Picula	Social Democratic Party (SDP)	S&D	30,099	
Romana Jerković	Social Democratic Party (SDP)	S&D	1,005	
Marko Vešligaj (Note: Replacement for Predrag Matić who died on 24 August 2024.)	Social Democratic Party (SDP)	S&D	5,541	
Stephen Nikola Bartulica	Home and National Rally (DOMiNO) (Note: Bartulica was elected on the Homeland Movement (DP) list, but left the party on 31 August 2024 due to conflict with the party leader Ivan Penava.)	ECR	35,303	
Gordan Bosanac (Note: Ivana Kekin was elected but refused to take her seat.)	We Can! (M!)	Greens/EFA	6,134	

== Replaced members ==
Name	National party	EP Group	Preference votes	Left office	Notes	Ref
Predrag Matić	Social Democratic Party (SDP)	S&D	17,239	24 August 2024	Died in office.	
