= Croatia (European Parliament constituency) =

Constituency of the European Parliament

- European Parliament constituency
- Location among the current constituencies
- Member state: Croatia
- Created: 2013
- MEPs: 12 (2013–2014); 11 (2014–2019); 12 (2019–2024); 12 (2024–present)

Croatia is a European Parliament constituency for elections in the European Union covering the member state of Croatia. It is currently represented by twelve Members of the European Parliament. Members are elected by proportional representation using open lists.

== Members of the European Parliament ==
Election	MEP (Party)	MEP (Party)	MEP (Party)	MEP (Party)	MEP (Party)	MEP (Party)	MEP (Party)	MEP (Party)	MEP (Party)	MEP (Party)	MEP (Party)	MEP (Party)
2013	Dubravka Šuica; HDZ	Andrej Plenković; HDZ	Davor Ivo Stier; HDZ	Ivana Maletić; HDZ	Ruža Tomašić; HSP AS (until 2019); HKS (since 2019)	Tonino Picula; SDP	Biljana Borzan; SDP	Nikola Vuljanić; HL	Zdravka Bušić; HDZ	Marino Baldini; SDP	Oleg Valjalo; SDP	Sandra Petrović Jakovina; SDP
2014	Dubravka Šuica; HDZ	Andrej Plenković; HDZ	Davor Ivo Stier; HDZ	Ivana Maletić; HDZ	Ruža Tomašić; HSP AS (until 2019); HKS (since 2019)	Tonino Picula; SDP	Biljana Borzan; SDP	Jozo Radoš; HNS	Marijana Petir; HSS	Ivan Jakovčić; IDS	Davor Škrlec; ORaH	
2019	Sunčana Glavak; HDZ	Karlo Ressler; HDZ	Tomislav Sokol; HDZ	Željana Zovko; HDZ	Ruža Tomašić; HSP AS (until 2019); HKS (since 2019)	Tonino Picula; SDP	Biljana Borzan; SDP	Predrag Matić; SDP	Mislav Kolakušić; Ind.	Valter Flego; IDS	Ivan Vilibor Sinčić; ŽZ	Romana Jerković; SDP
2024	Sunčana Glavak; HDZ	Karlo Ressler; HDZ	Tomislav Sokol; HDZ	Željana Zovko; HDZ	Davor Ivo Stier; HDZ	Tonino Picula; SDP	Biljana Borzan; SDP	Marko Vešligaj; SDP	Nikolina Brnjac; HDZ	Stephen Nikola Bartulica; DOMiNO	Gordan Bosanac; Možemo!	Romana Jerković; SDP

== Election results ==
Seats won in elections for Members of the European Parliament for Croatia by individual parties European Parliament elections in Croatia (since 2013)
Party (European Parliament group)	2013	2014	2019	2024
Croatian Conservative Party (ECR)	–	–	1	–
Croatian Democratic Union (EPP)	5	4	4	6
Croatian Labourists - Labour Party (EUL-NGL)	1	0	0	–
Croatian Party of Rights dr. Ante Starčević (ECR)	1	1	0	–
Croatian Peasant Party (EPP)	0	1	0	–
Croatian People's Party – Liberal Democrats (ALDE)	0	1	0	–
Croatian Sustainable Development (Greens/EFA)	–	1	0	–
Homeland Movement (ECR)	–	–	–	1
Human Shield (Non-Inscrits)	0	0	1	–
Independent list of Mislav Kolakušić (Non-Inscrits)	0	0	1	–
Istrian Democratic Assembly (ALDE / Renew Europe)	0	1	1	0
Social Democratic Party of Croatia (S&D)	5	2	4	4
We Can! (Greens/EFA)	–	–	0	1
Total seats	12	11	12	12
Source: State Election Commission

=== Elected Members of the European Parliament from Croatia for 2013–2014 (by party list) ===
Party list 12: HDZ – HSP AS – BUZ	Party list 17: HL	Party list 24: SDP – HNS – HSU
1. Dubravka Šuica (HDZ); 2. Andrej Plenković (HDZ); 3. Davor Ivo Stier (HDZ); 4. Ivana Maletić (HDZ); 5. Zdravka Bušić (HDZ); 6. Ruža Tomašić (HSP AS)	1. Nikola Vuljanić (HL)	1. Tonino Picula (SDP); 2. Biljana Borzan (SDP); 3. Marino Baldini (SDP); 4. Oleg Valjalo (SDP); 5. Sandra Petrović Jakovina (SDP)

=== Elected Members of the European Parliament from Croatia for 2014–2019 (by party list) ===
Party list 6: HDZ – HSS – HSP AS – BUZ	Party list 15: ORaH	Party list 20: SDP – HNS – IDS – HSU
1. Andrej Plenković (HDZ); 2. Dubravka Šuica (HDZ); 3. Ivana Maletić (HDZ); 4. Marijana Petir (HSS); 5. Ruža Tomašić (HSP AS); 6. Davor Ivo Stier (HDZ)	1. Davor Škrlec (ORaH)	1. Biljana Borzan (SDP); 2. Jozo Radoš (HNS); 3. Tonino Picula (SDP); 4. Ivan Jakovčić (IDS)

=== Elected Members of the European Parliament from Croatia for 2019–2024 (by party list) ===
Party list 6: HRAST – HKS – HSP AS – UHD	Party list 9: HDZ	Party list 12: HSS – GLAS – IDS – HSU – PGS – D – HL	Party list 15: Independent list of Mislav Kolakušić	Party list 28: SDP	Party list 33: ŽZ
1. Ruža Tomašić (HKS)	1. Karlo Ressler (HDZ); 2. Dubravka Šuica (HDZ); 3. Tomislav Sokol (HDZ); 4. Željana Zovko (HDZ)	1. Valter Flego (IDS)	1. Mislav Kolakušić (Ind.)	1. Biljana Borzan (SDP); 2. Tonino Picula (SDP); 3. Predrag Fred Matić (SDP); 4. Romana Jerković (SDP)	1. Ivan Vilibor Sinčić (ŽZ)

=== Elected Members of the European Parliament from Croatia for 2024–2029 (by party list) ===
Party list 5: HDZ	Party list 22: SDP – Centar – HSS – GLAS – DO i SIP	Party list 4: DP	Party list 14: Možemo!
1. Davor Ivo Stier (HDZ); 2. Nikolina Brnjac (HDZ); 3. Željana Zovko (HDZ); 4. Karlo Ressler (HDZ); 5. Sunčana Glavak (HDZ); 6. Tomislav Sokol (HDZ)	1. Biljana Borzan (SDP); 2. Tonino Picula (SDP); 3. Romana Jerković (SDP); 4. Marko Vešligaj (SDP)	1. Stephen Nikola Bartulica (DP)	1. Gordan Bosanac (Možemo!)

== Elections ==
=== 2013 ===
The 2013 election was the first European election for Croatia.

=== 2014 ===
The 2014 European election was the eighth election to the European Parliament and the second for Croatia.

=== 2019 ===
The 2019 European election was the ninth election to the European Parliament and the third for Croatia.

=== 2024 ===
The 2024 European election was the tenth election to the European Parliament and the fourth for Croatia.

== See also ==
- List of female members of the European Parliament for Croatia
- List of observers to the European Parliament for Croatia, 2012–13
