= List of members of the European Parliament for Croatia, 2019–2024 =

This is a list of the 12 members of the European Parliament for Croatia in the 2019 to 2024 session.

These MEPs were elected at the 2019 European Parliament election in Croatia.

== List ==
On the Croatian Democratic Union list (EPP Group)

1. Karlo Ressler
2. Dubravka Šuica – until 30 November 2019
  Sunčana Glavak – since 1 December 2019
3. Tomislav Sokol
4. Željana Zovko

On the Social Democratic Party of Croatia list: (S&D)

1. Tonino Picula
2. Biljana Borzan
3. Predrag Fred Matić
4. Romana Jerković – since 1 February 2020

On an Independent list: (Non-Inscrits)

1. Mislav Kolakušić

On the Croatian Conservative Party-led list: (ECR)

1. Ruža Tomašić

On the Human Shield list: (Non-Inscrits)

1. Ivan Vilibor Sinčić

On the Amsterdam Coalition list:

1. Valter Flego (IDS, Renew)

== See also ==
- List of members of the European Parliament, 2019–2024
- 2019 European Parliament election
- Politics of Croatia
