= List of members of the European Parliament for Croatia, 2014–2019 =

This is a list of members of the European Parliament for the Croatia in the 2014 to 2019 session, ordered by name.

See 2014 European Parliament election in Croatia for further information on these elections in Croatia.

== List ==
This table can be sorted by party or party group: click the symbol at the top of the appropriate column.

Name	National party	EP group
Biljana Borzan	Social Democratic Party (SDP)	S&D
Davor Škrlec (Note: Mirela Holy was elected but she did not take her seat. Škrlec left Croatian Sustainable Development (ORaH) in 2016)	None	Greens/EFA
Ivana Maletić	Croatian Democratic Union (HDZ)	EPP
Ivan Jakovčić (Note: Neven Mimica from SDP was elected but he did not take his seat due to becoming member of the European Commission)	Istrian Democratic Assembly (IDS-DDI)	ALDE
Marijana Petir (Note: Marijana Petir was elected as a candidate of the Croatian Peasant Party but serves as independent MEP since 2017 after she was expelled from the party.)	None	EPP
Tonino Picula	Social Democratic Party (SDP)	S&D
Jozo Radoš (Note: Jozo Radoš left Croatian People's Party-Liberal Democrats (HNS) in June 2017 after party entered a coalition with conservative Croatian Democratic Union (HDZ) and joined a newly formed Civic-Liberal Alliance party in July 2017.)	Civic-Liberal Alliance (GLAS)	ALDE
Dubravka Šuica	Croatian Democratic Union (HDZ)	EPP
Ivica Tolić	Croatian Democratic Union (HDZ)	EPP
Ruža Tomašić	Croatian Conservative Party (HKS)	ECR
Željana Zovko	Croatian Democratic Union (HDZ)	EPP

=== Former ===
Name	National party	EP group	Left office	Notes
Andrej Plenković	Croatian Democratic Union (HDZ)	EPP	12 October 2016	Resigned to take office as 12th Prime Minister of Croatia on 19 October 2016
Davor Ivo Stier	Croatian Democratic Union (HDZ)	EPP	12 October 2016	Resigned to become Minister of Foreign and European Affairs in the Cabinet of Andrej Plenković on 19 October 2016
