= List of members of the European Parliament for Croatia, 2013–2014 =

This is a list of the 12 members to the European Parliament for Croatia in the 2009 to 2014 session. They were elected on 14 April 2013, in what was the first European Parliament election in Croatia, and took office on 1 July.

== List ==
Name	National party	EP Group	Preferential votes
Marino Baldini	Social Democratic Party	S&D	1,631
Biljana Borzan	Social Democratic Party	S&D	17,584
Zdravka Bušić	Croatian Democratic Union	EPP	4,010
Ivana Maletić	Croatian Democratic Union	EPP	4,424
Sandra Petrović Jakovina	Social Democratic Party	S&D	3,806
Tonino Picula	Social Democratic Party	S&D	110,278
Andrej Plenković	Croatian Democratic Union	EPP	37,015
Davor Ivo Stier	Croatian Democratic Union	EPP	13,752
Dubravka Šuica	Croatian Democratic Union	EPP	30,979
Ruža Tomašić	Party of Rights dr. Ante Starčević	ECR	63,882
Oleg Valjalo	Social Democratic Party	S&D	1,325
Nikola Vuljanić	Labourists–Labour Party	EUL–NGL	6,351

Source: Večernji list

=== Party representation ===
National party	EP Group	# of seats	±
Croatian Democratic Union (and allies)	EPP	5 / 12	–
Social Democratic Party (and allies)	S&D	5 / 12	–
Labourists–Labour Party	EUL–NGL	1 / 12	–
Party of Rights dr. Ante Starčević	ECR	1 / 12	–
