= Jakovina =

Jakovina is a Croatian and West Ukrainian surname. Notable people with the surname include:

- Sandra Petrović Jakovina (born 1985), Croatian politician
- Tina Jakovina (born 1992), Slovenian basketball player
- Tvrtko Jakovina (born 1972), Croatian historian
