= Škrlec =

Škrlec is a surname. Notable people with the surname include:

- Davor Škrlec (born 1963), Croatian politician
- Ivan Škrlec (1873–1951), Croatian politician
