= List of observers to the European Parliament for Croatia, 2012–2013 =

This is a list of the 12 observers to the European Parliament for Croatia in the 2009 to 2014 session. They were appointed by the Croatian Parliament to be observers from 1 April 2012 until the accession of Croatia to the EU on 1 July 2013.

== List ==
Name	National party	EP Group	Committee
Ingrid Antičević-Marinović	Social Democratic Party	S&D	Liberties
Biljana Borzan	Social Democratic Party	S&D	Transport
Davor Božinović	Democratic Union	EPP	Foreign Affairs
Boro Grubišić	Croatian Democratic Alliance of Slavonia and Baranja	NI	Agriculture
Romana Jerković	Social Democratic Party	S&D	Environment
Frano Matušić	Democratic Union	EPP	Culture
Tonino Picula	Social Democratic Party	S&D	Foreign Affairs
Andrej Plenković	Democratic Union	EPP	Budget
Milorad Pupovac	Independent Democratic Serb Party	S&D	Budget
Jozo Radoš	Croatian People's Party–Liberal Democrats	ALDE	Foreign Affairs
Tanja Vrbat	Social Democratic Party	S&D	Constitutional Affairs
Nikola Vuljanić	Labourists–Labour Party	S&D	Culture

== Sources ==
- The Observers in the European Parliament
