= Women in Croatia =

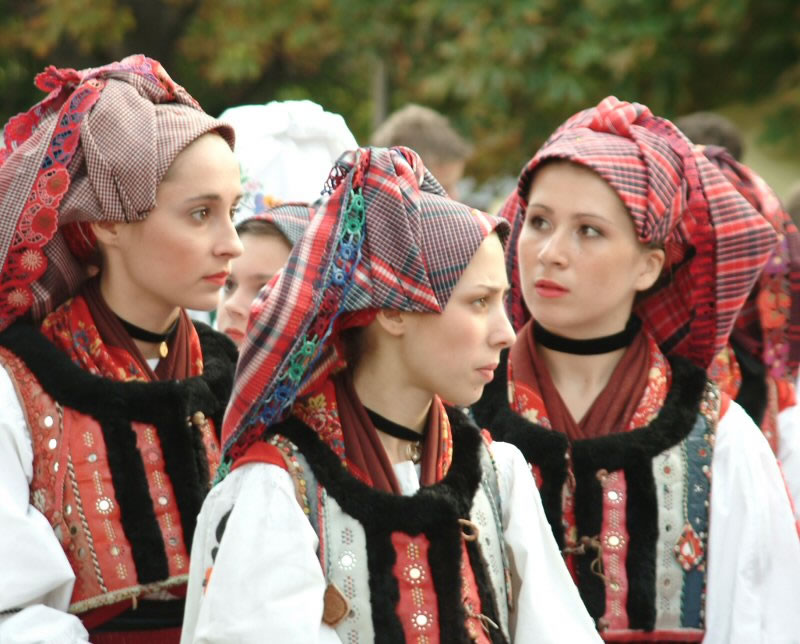
- Women in Croatia wearing traditional costume

General statistics
- Maternal mortality (per 100,000): 17 (2010)
- Women in parliament: 23.8% (2013)
- Women over 25 with secondary education: 85.0% (2012)
- Women in labour force: 57.1% employment rate (2019)

Gender Inequality Index
- Value: 0.093 (2021)
- Rank: 26th out of 191

Global Gender Gap Index
- Value: 0.733 (2021)
- Rank: 45th out of 156

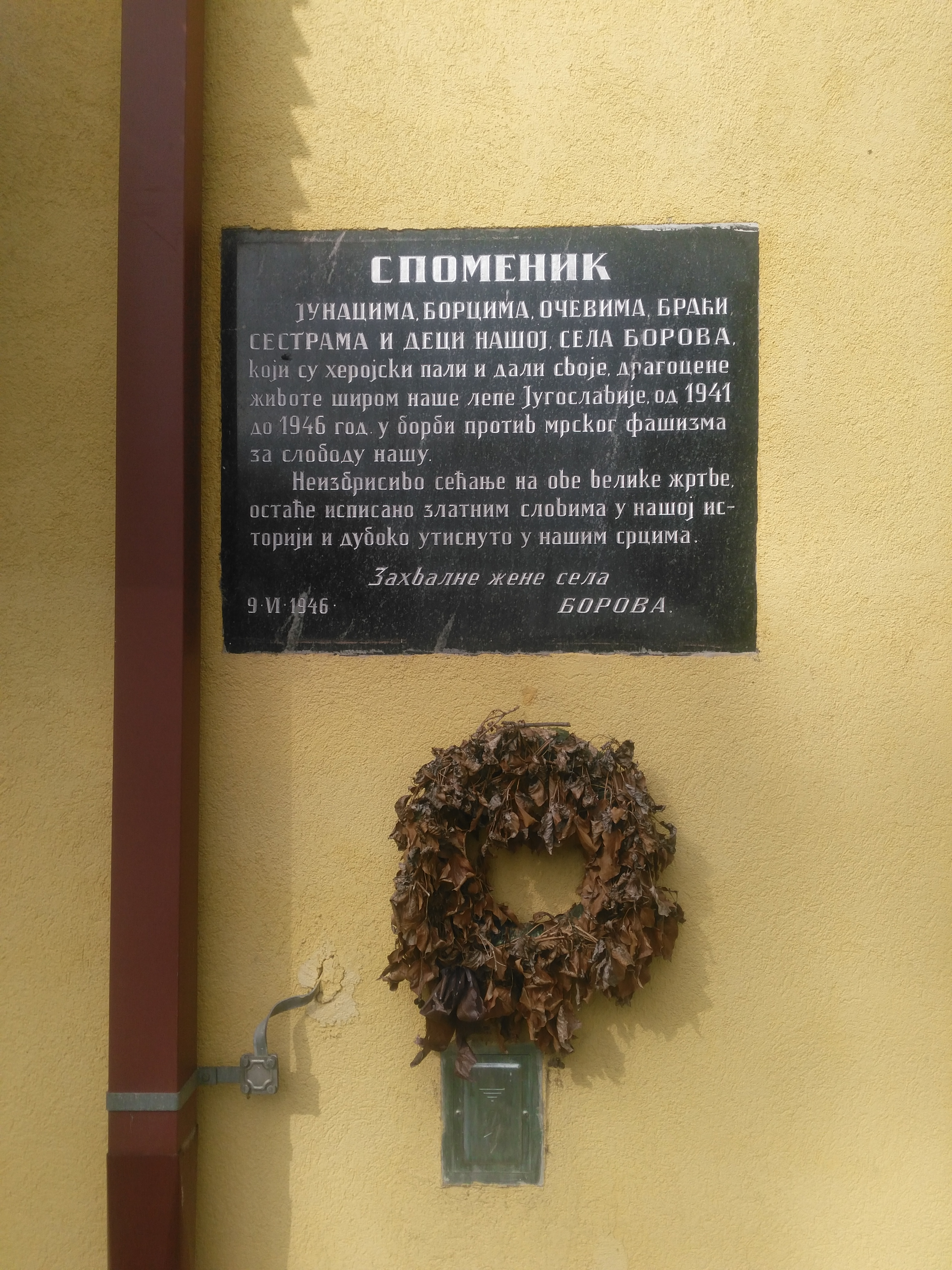
1946 WWII victims memorial (in Serbian Cyrillic) by women of Borovo.

Women in Croatia form half the population and in modern Croatian culture they are largely equal to men.

== Demographics ==
According to the 2011 Croatian census, there are 2,218,554 women in Croatia out of a total population of 4,284,889.

The sex ratio of the population is 1.06 males per 1 female at birth and up to 14 years of age, and 0.99 males per 1 female between the ages of 15 and 64. But at ages over 64 the ratio is 0.64 males per 1 female. The ratio for the total population is 0.93 males per 1 female. Life expectancy for women in Croatia is 80.1 years (2012).

In 2009, there were 44,577 live births in Croatia, comprising 22,877 male and 21,700 female children. Virtually all of those were performed in medical facilities; only 34 births occurred elsewhere. Out of the total number, 38,809 children were born in wedlock or within 300 days after the end of the marriage, and the average age of mothers at the birth of their first child was 27 years and 5 months. General fertility rate, i.e. number of births per 1,000 women aged 15–49 is 42.9, with the age specific rate peaking at 101.0 per million for women aged 25–29.

In 2014, there were a total of 1.342 million employed persons, with 46% of that number pertaining to women.

In 2013, the principal cause of death for women in Croatia were diseases of the circulatory system at 54.3%, followed by tumors at 23.6%. Other significant causes of death are injuries, poisonings and other external causes (4.3%), respiratory system diseases (3.5%), digestive system diseases (3.3%), and endocrine, nutritional and metabolic diseases (2.8%).

== Notable Croatian women ==
The History of Croatia records several notable Croatian women.

Jelena Nelipčić was the Queen of Bosnia. Beatrica Frankopan was noblewoman, and by marriage an heiress of Hunyad Castle. Ana Katarina Zrinska, also from Frankopan family, was a noblewoman, remembered as a patron of the arts, writer and patriot. Her daughter, Jelena Zrinski, is considered a national heroine. Another notable woman in Croatian political history was Savka Dabčević-Kučar, who became one of the most influential Croatian female politicians during the communist period, and became the 5th prime minister of Croatia, and the 1st female prime minister of Croatia.

In art, Ivana Brlić-Mažuranić is remembered as the best Croatian writer for children. Slava Raškaj was a painter considered to be the greatest Croatian watercolorist of the late 19th and early 20th century. Dora Pejačević was one of the composers to introduce the orchestral song to Croatian music, while Paula von Preradović wrote the lyrics for the national anthem of Austria, "Land der Berge, Land am Strome".

== Legal status ==
Gender equality is part of Article 3 of the Constitution of Croatia.

A gender equality ombudsman and the Office for Gender Equality has existed since 2003.

Women's suffrage was introduced when the second Yugoslavia was formed in 1945.

== See also ==
- Women government ministers of Croatia
- List of female members of the European Parliament for Croatia
- Women mayors of places in Croatia
- Women's Antifascist Front of Croatia
- Gender roles in post-communist Central and Eastern Europe
- Women in Europe
