= Marino Baldini =

Croatian politician (born 1963)

Marino Baldini MEP
- In office 1 July 2013 – 1 July 2014

Personal details
- Born: 12 July 1963 (age 62) Poreč, SR Croatia, SFR Yugoslavia (modern Croatia)
- Party: Social Democratic Party of Croatia

Marino Baldini (born 12 July 1963 in Poreč) is a member of the Social Democratic Party of Croatia and at the 2013 European Parliament election in Croatia was elected as one of the new Croatian members of the European Parliament.

He is a Master of Social Services, archaeology and art.

Following the accession of Croatia to the European Union in 2013, Baldini was placed on the Parliament's Committee of Economic and Monetary Affairs.
