= Tomislav Sokol =

Croatian politician (born 1982)

Tomislav Sokol MEP
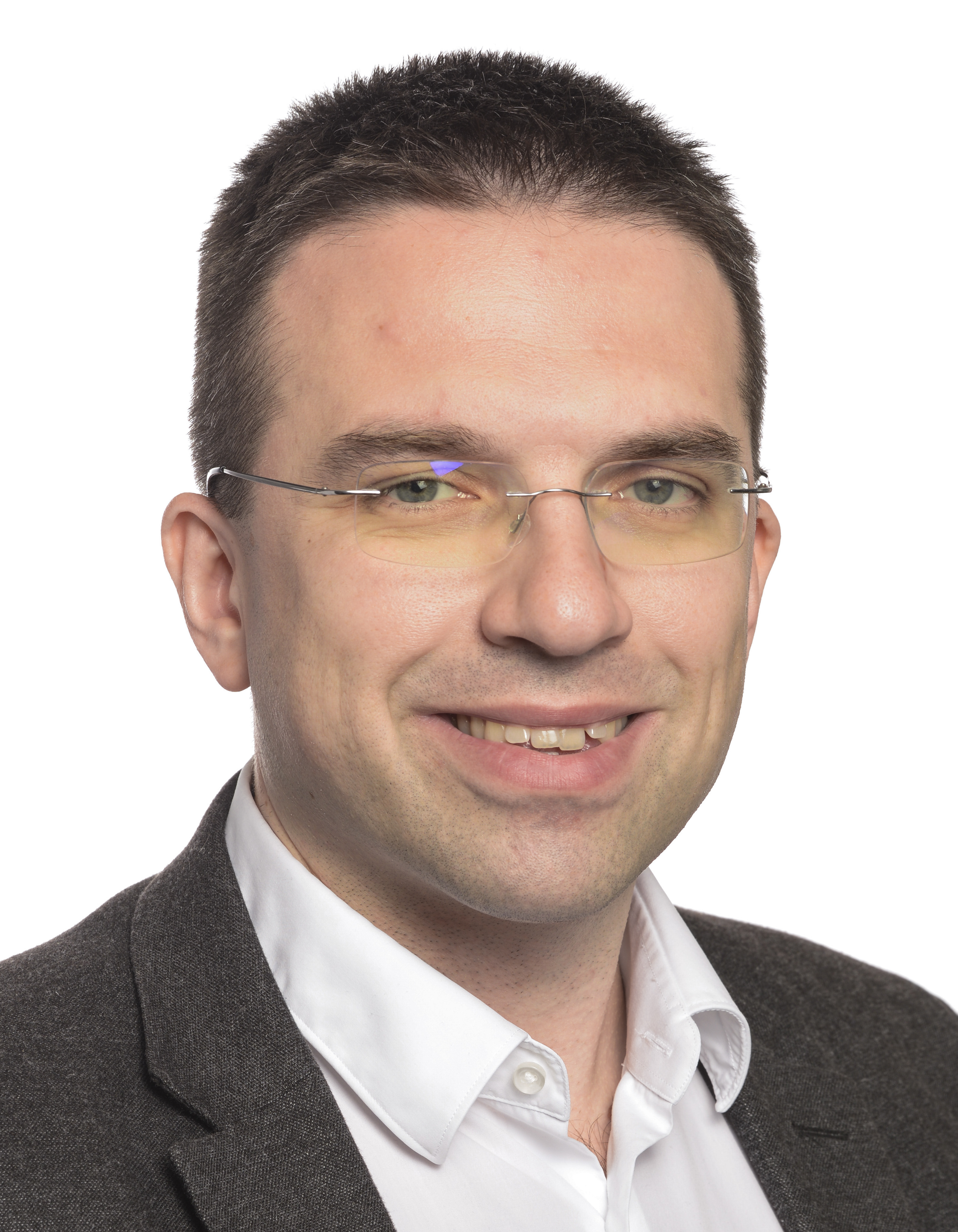

Member of the European Parliament for Croatia
- Incumbent
- Assumed office 2 July 2019

Personal details
- Born: 20 September 1982 (age 43) Zagreb, SR Croatia, SFR Yugoslavia (modern Croatia)
- Party: Croatian; Croatian Democratic Union; EU; European People's Party

Tomislav Sokol (born 20 September 1982) is a Croatian politician currently serving as a Member of the European Parliament for the Croatian Democratic Union since 2019.

== Political career ==
Sokol became a Member of the European Parliament in the 2019 election. He has since been serving on the Committee on the Internal Market and Consumer Protection. In 2022, he also joined the Special Committee on the COVID-19 pandemic. Also since 2022, he has been the parliament’s ENVI rapporteur on the European Commission’s proposal for a European Health Data Space.

In addition to his committee assignments, Sokol is part of the Parliament's delegation to the EU-Turkey Joint Parliamentary Committee. He is also a member of the European Parliament Intergroup on Seas, Rivers, Islands and Coastal Areas and the MEPs Against Cancer group.
