= Marko Vešligaj =

Croatian politician (born 1982)

Marko Vešligaj MEP
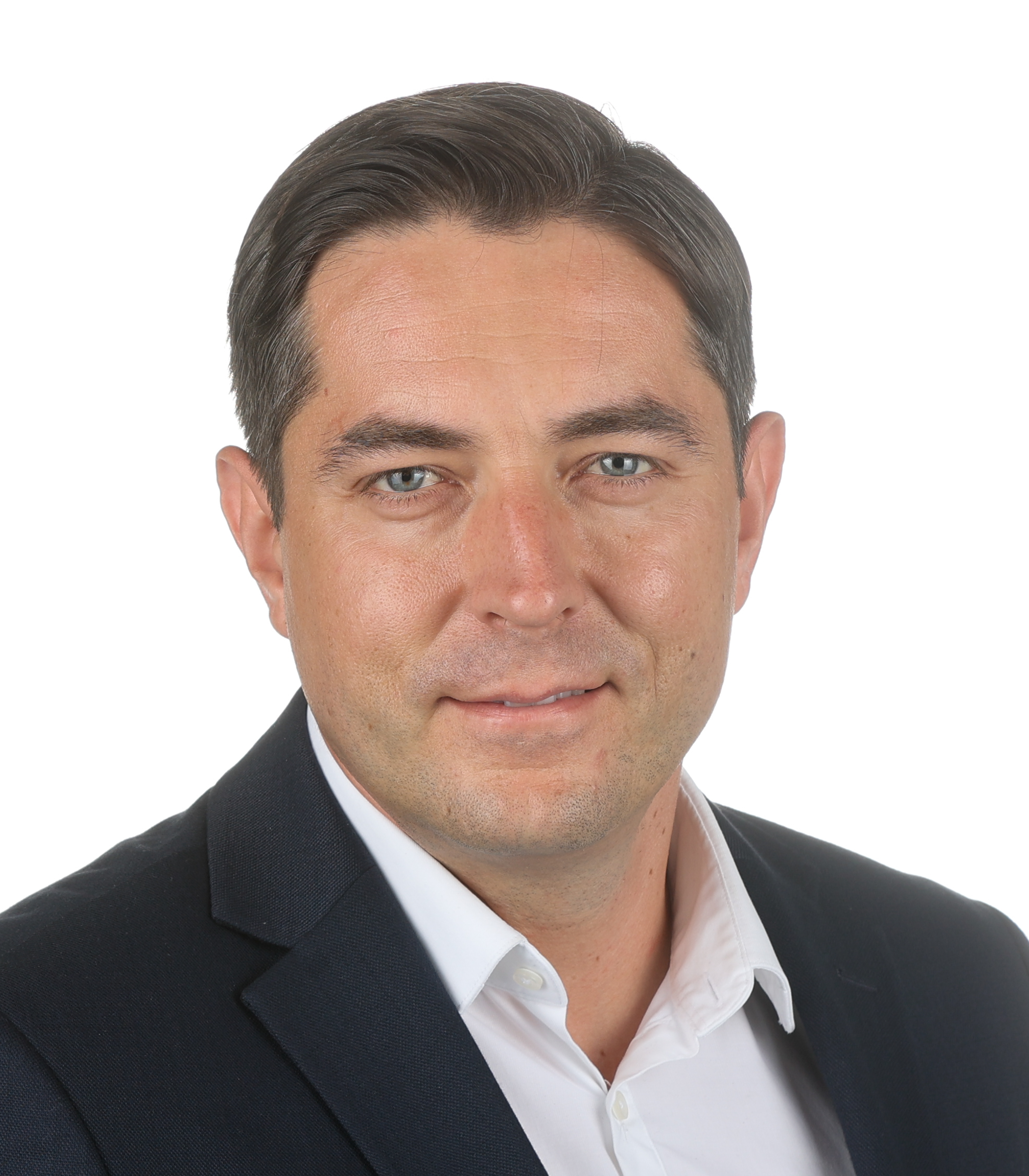

Member of the European Parliament for Croatia
- Incumbent
- Assumed office 5 September 2024
- Preceded by: Predrag Fred Matić

Mayor of Pregrada
- In office 19 May 2013 – 5 June 2025

Member of the Croatian Parliament
- In office 14 October 2016 – 22 July 2020

Personal details
- Born: 17 April 1982 (age 44)
- Party: Social Democratic Party

Marko Vešligaj (born 17 April 1982) is a Croatian politician who has served as a Member of the European Parliament since 2024. A member of the Social Democratic Party of Croatia, he sits with the Group of the Progressive Alliance of Socialists and Democrats in the European Parliament and serves as a vice-chair of the Committee on Women’s Rights and Gender Equality.

Before his election to the European Parliament, Vešligaj served as mayor of the City of Pregrada from 2013 to 2025 and as a member of the Croatian Parliament from 2016 to 2020. Earlier in his political career, he served as a member of the Assembly of Krapina-Zagorje County from 2005 to 2009 and as president of the SDP Youth Forum in the county from 2007 to 2011.
