= Oleg Valjalo =

Croatian politician (born 1970)

MEP

Member of the European Parliament for Croatia
- In office 1 July 2013 – 1 July 2014

Minister of Tourism Acting
- In office 9 March 2013 – 19 March 2013
- Prime Minister: Zoran Milanović
- Preceded by: Veljko Ostojić
- Succeeded by: Darko Lorencin

Personal details
- Born: 19 November 1970 (age 55) Dubrovnik, SR Croatia, SFR Yugoslavia
- Party: Social Democratic Party

Oleg Valjalo (born 19 November 1970( is a Croatian politician who served as a Croatian member of the European Parliament from the accession of Croatia to the European Union on 1 July 2013 until 1 July 2014. He was placed on the European Parliament Committee on Budgets during his term. He is a member of the Social Democratic Party of Croatia.

He has an MA in economics and has worked in banking and tourism.
