= MEPs Against Cancer =

- Abbreviation: MAC
- Formation: 2005
- Type: Advocacy group
- Location: Brussels, Belgium
- Region served: European Union
- Members: Members of the European Parliament
- Chair: Romana Jerković
- Affiliations: European Parliament
- Website: Official website

MEPs Against Cancer is a group of 23 Members of the European Parliament who aim to "promote action on cancer as an EU priority and harness European health policy to that end" and to encourage every country to develop a national plan for combating cancer.

During the 2019–2024 parliament, the group was chaired by Cypriot MEP Loukas Fourlas and French MEP Véronique Trillet-Lenoir until her death in 2023. The members of the group came from 25 EU member states and all EU parliament groups.

In the incumbent 2024–2029 parliament, the group has 23 MEPs from 19 member states. Croatian MEP Romana Jerković is the current chair of the group.
