= 2014 European Parliament election in Croatia =

- 25 May 2014

All 11 Croatian seats in the European Parliament
- Turnout: 25.24%
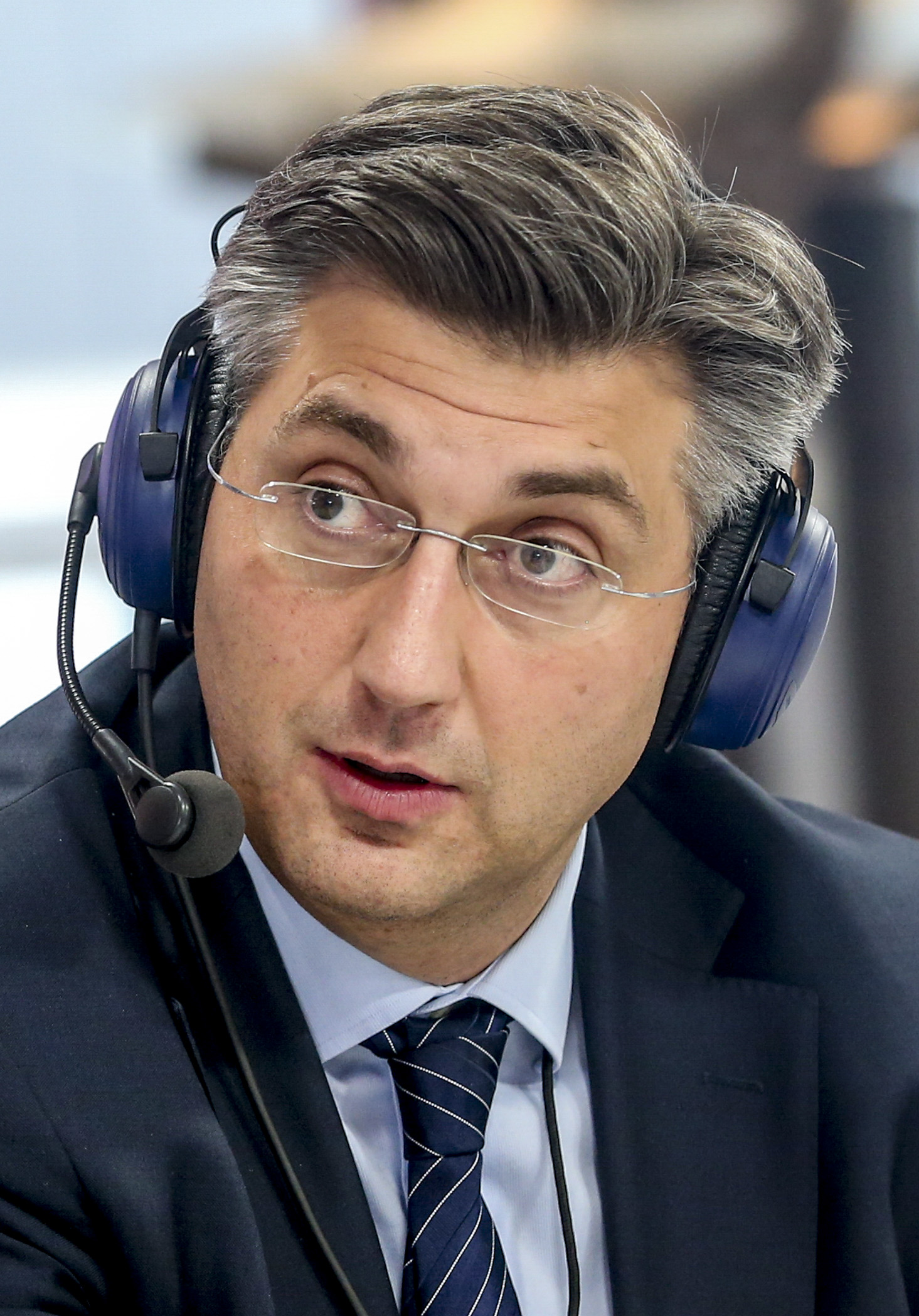

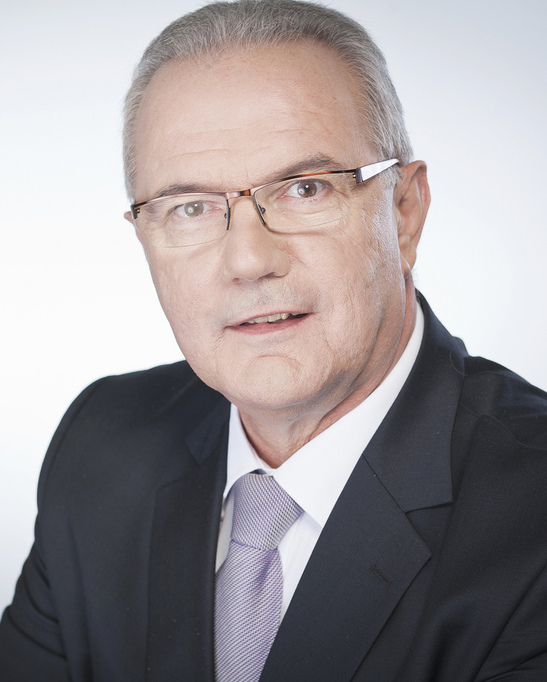

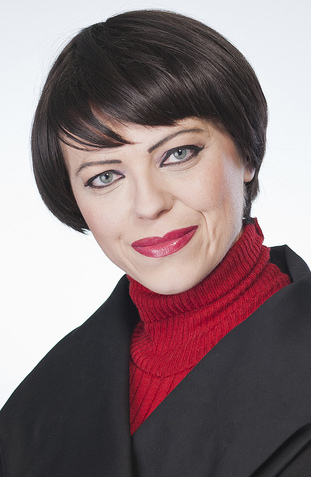
	First party	Second party	Third party
Leader	Andrej Plenković	Neven Mimica	Mirela Holy
Party	Patriotic Coalition	Kukuriku	Sustainable Development of Croatia
Alliance	EPP	S&D	European Greens
Last election	6 seats	5 seats	–
Seats won	6 / 11	4 / 11	1 / 11
Seat change	Steady	▼1	New
Popular vote	381,844	275,904	86,806
Percentage	41.42%	29.93%	9.42%

European Parliament elections were held in Croatia on 25 May 2014.

These were the second elections to the European Parliament in Croatia since the country's accession to the European Union was completed in 2013.

The country formed a single constituency, with members elected by proportional representation using open lists.

== Opinion polls ==
Date	Polling Organisation/Client	HDZ coalition	Kukuriku coalition	Labour	ORaH	Partnership of Croatian Center	Alliance for Croatia	Other
16 May 2014	Ipsos Puls for Nova TV	30.0%	24.7%	6.7%	8.7%	3.2%	5.9%	
30 April 2014	Poll watch	29.1%	27.4%	10.2%	12.5%	3.7%	7.1%	3.3%
23 April 2014	Poll watch	28.8%	31.6%	9.7%	9.2%	6.5%	8.7%	3.0%
2 April 2014	Poll watch	28.0%	30.0%	10.0%	8.6%	6.1%	6.5%	
19 March 2014	Poll watch	32.0%	36.0%	11.0%	6.8%	7.0%	5.9%	
5 March 2014	Poll watch	29.0%	31.0%	11.0%	6.1%	3.2%	7.3%	
19 February 2014	Poll watch	26.0%	33.0%	11.0%		2.9%	2.7%	

=== Seat projections ===
Date	Polling Organisation/Client	HDZ coalition	Kukuriku coalition	Labour	ORaH	Partnership of Croatian Center	Alliance for Croatia	Other
22 May 2014	Scenari politici	5	4	0	1	0	1	0
19 May 2014	Der (europäische) Föderalist	4	3	1	2	0	1	0
19 May 2014	Scenari politici	4	4	1	1	0	1	0
16 May 2014	Ipsos Puls for Nova TV	6	4	0	1	0	0	0
14 May 2014	Scenari politici	4	4	1	1	0	1	0
7 May 2014	Der (europäische) Föderalist	3	3	1	2	1	1	0
7 May 2014	Poll watch	4	4	1	1	0	1	0
30 April 2014	Poll watch	4	4	1	1	0	1	0
28 April 2014	Der (europäische) Föderalist	3	3	2	2	0	1	0
23 April 2014	Poll watch	3	4	1	1	1	1	0
21 April 2014	Der (europäische) Föderalist	3	4	1	1	1	1	0
16 April 2014	Poll Watch	3	4	1	1	1	1	0
16 April 2014	Scenari politici	3	4	1	1	1	1	0
14 April 2014	Der (europäische) Föderalist	3	4	1	1	1	1	0
2 April 2014	Poll Watch	3	4	1	1	1	1	0
2 April 2014	Der (europäische) Föderalist	3	3	2	1	1	1	0
19 March 2014	Der (europäische) Föderalist	3	4	1	1	1	1	0
19 March 2014	Scenari Politici	4	5	1	1	0	0	0
19 March 2014	Poll watch	4	6	1	0	0	0	0
5 March 2014	Poll Watch	4	3	2	1	1	1	0
20 February 2014	Scenari Politici	5	5	1	0	0	0	0
19 February 2014	Poll Watch	4	5	1	0	1	1	0

== Results ==
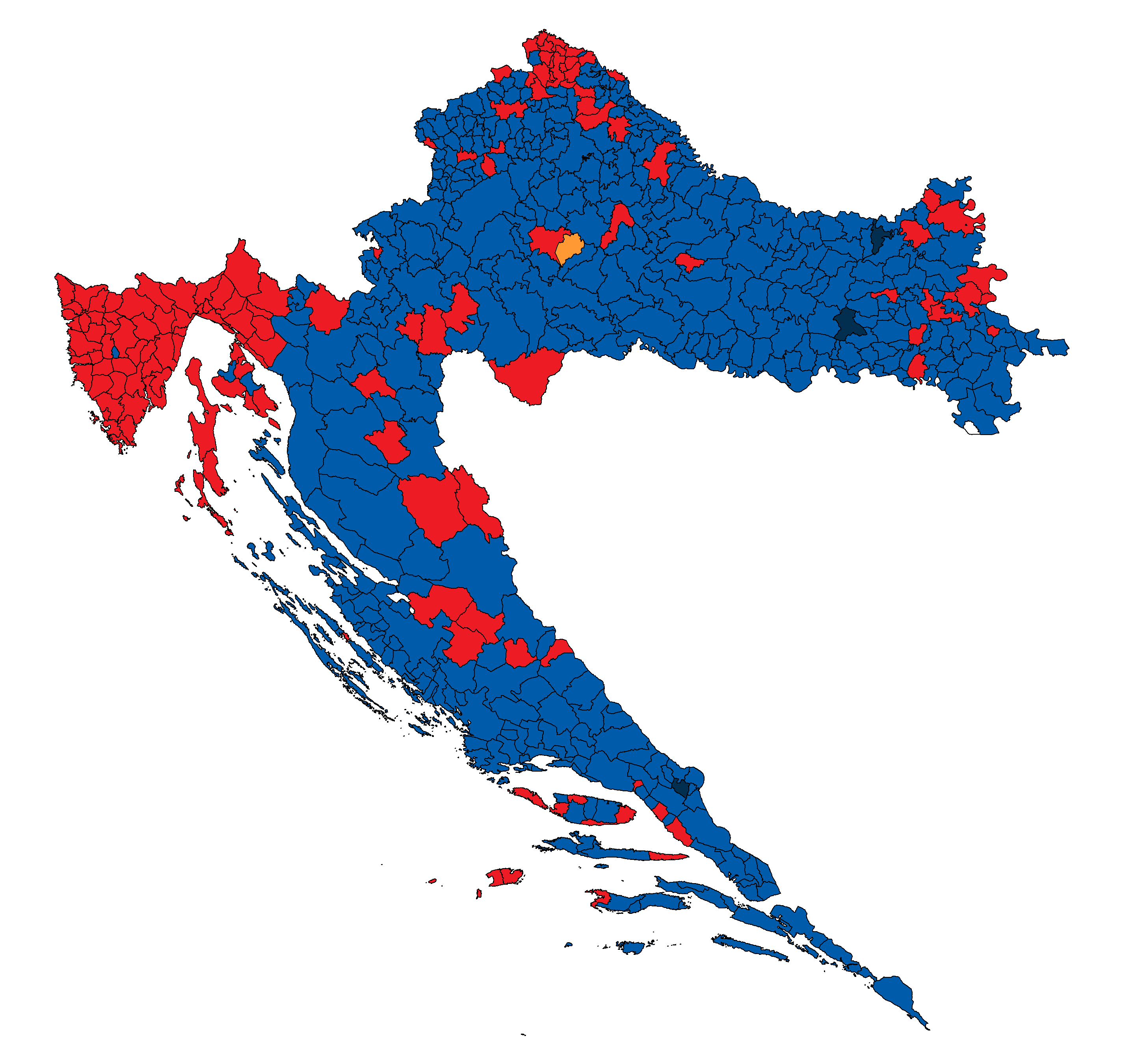
Results of the election based on the majority of votes in each municipality of Croatia HDZ coalition Kukuriku coalition Alliance for Croatia Labour

Results by municipality, shaded according to winning party's percentage of the vote.: HDZ—>80% HDZ—70–80% HDZ—60–70% HDZ—50–60% HDZ—40–50% HDZ—<40% / SDP—>80% SDP—70–80% SDP—60–70% SDP—50–60% SDP—40–50% SDP—<40% / SZH—40–50% SZH—<40% Labour—<40%

Party	Votes	%	Seats
HDZ–HSS–HSP AS–BUZ–ZDS–HDS	381,844	41.42	6
SDP–HNS–IDS–HSU–Independent Democratic Serb Party	275,904	29.93	4
Sustainable Development of Croatia	86,806	9.42	1
Alliance for Croatia	63,437	6.88	0
Croatian Labourists – Labour Party	31,363	3.40	0
NF–HSLS–PGS–RI	22,098	2.40	0
Youth Action	7,807	0.85	0
Pensioners' Party	6,950	0.75	0
DSŽ–HSN–ASBU	4,822	0.52	0
Alliance for Change	4,313	0.47	0
Alphabet of Democracy	3,684	0.40	0
ZELENIHR–AMD–ZS	3,640	0.39	0
Pirate Party	3,623	0.39	0
Authentic Croatian Party of Rights	3,455	0.37	0
Croatian Workers Party	3,214	0.35	0
Democratic Prigorje–Zagreb Party	2,745	0.30	0
Independent List – Anto Đapić	2,633	0.29	0
Power of Roma in Croatia	2,513	0.27	0
Movement for a Modern Croatia	2,330	0.25	0
Međimurje Democratic Alliance	1,783	0.19	0
Socialist Labour Party of Croatia	1,769	0.19	0
Our Party–New Serb Party	1,600	0.17	0
Croatian Party of Order	1,435	0.16	0
Socialist Party of Croatia	1,248	0.14	0
Croatian Community Party	888	0.10	0
Total	921,904	100.00	11
Valid votes	921,904	96.94	
Invalid/blank votes	29,076	3.06	
Total votes	950,980	100.00	
Registered voters/turnout	3,767,343	25.24	
Source: State Election Committee

== Elected lists and candidates ==
6: HDZ – HSS – HSP AS – BUZ	15: ORaH	20: SDP – HNS – IDS – HSU
* Andrej Plenković (HDZ) * Dubravka Šuica (HDZ) * Ivana Maletić (HDZ) * Marijana Petir (HSS) * Ruža Tomašić (HSP AS) * Davor Ivo Stier (HDZ)	* Davor Škrlec (ORaH)	* Biljana Borzan (SDP) * Jozo Radoš (HNS) * Tonino Picula (SDP) * Ivan Jakovčić (IDS)
