= Zdravka Bušić =

Croatian politician (born 1950)

Zdravka Bušić MEP
- Zdravka Bušić in 2026
- In office 1 July 2013 – 30 June 2014

Personal details
- Born: 6 September 1950 (age 76) Imotski, PR Croatia, FPR Yugoslavia (modern Croatia)
- Party: Croatian Democratic Union
- Spouse: Vinko Logarušić (m. 1971; died 1997)
- Relatives: Zvonko Bušić (brother)

Zdravka Bušić (born 6 September 1950) is a Croatian politician for the centre-right Croatian Democratic Union party.

== Biography ==
Bušić graduated from high school in Split in 1967; she then moved along with her brother Zvonko Bušić to Vienna and the United States.

=== Engagement in Ustaša groups in the United States ===
Bušić graduated in political science from Cleveland State University, and she went on to gain a master's degree in information management from Case Western Reserve University. She worked as an archivist in Cleveland, including at the Western Reserve Historical Society, the Case Western Reserve University, and Oberlin College Library.

During the 1970s, Zdravka Bušić was a member of the Croatian National Resistance (HNO), also known as Otpor, an Ustaša organization responsible of several terrorist attacks against Yugoslav targets across the world. Otpor had been founded by Vjekoslav "Maks" Luburić, head of the concentration camps in the Independent State of Croatia (NDH) during the Second World War.

In 1977, journalist Nikola Majstrović was tasked to make a documentary featuring Croat emigrants in USA, titled The Croats: Terrorists or Freedom Fighters, in which Zdravka Bušić appears along her friend Mercedes Škegro, posing with guns and Croat fascist insignia.

Both her brother Zvonko Bušić and her husband Vinko Logarušić were members of the same HNO group and US-convicted terrorists. Zdravka's brother Zvonko Bušić was sentenced for life for hijacking a plane and killing a police officer in New York in 1976.

In 1982, Zdravka Bušić's husband Vinko Logarušić was sentenced to 20 years in prison together with five other HNO members for series of terror attacks. The New York Times covered the case, stressing it was "one of the rare cases in which the key actors of a terrorist group were sentenced."

=== Politics in independent Croatia ===
In view of the dissolution of Yugoslavia, all three members of the HNO Ustaša group returned to Croatia in 1990. Immediately Zdravka Bušić became an adviser to Franjo Tuđman and later to the head of the Office of the First President of the Republic of Croatia.

Between 1995 and 2003 she served two terms as a member of the Croatian Parliament. She was elected in the 11th constituency from so-called "diaspora" voter (voters without permanent residence in Croatia, i.e. emigrants and Bosnian citizens with Croatian passport). Elected to parliament as a HDZ candidate, she belonged to a group of five HDZ MPs led by Ivić Pašalić, who seceded from the HDZ to the right in 2002 (as opposed to Ivo Sanader's de-tudjmanisation and reorganisation of the party), founding a party called Hrvatski blok - Pokret za modernu Hrvatsku (Croatian Block - Movement for a modern Croatia). They did not manage to enter the Sabor in 2003. Some years after the self-dissolution of the Hrvatski Blok in 2008, Pašalić, Bušić and others rejoined the HDZ in 2012.

From 2004 to 2009 she worked as library advisor for computerization at the Croatian Institute for Librarianship at the National and University Library in Zagreb.

Between 2010 and 2013 she reported as having "studied foreign Croatica literature at the National and University Library in Zagreb.

Following Croatia's accession to the European Union in 2013, she was elected as one of the first group of Croatian members of the European Parliament. She served as MEP for one year between 2013 and 2014.

From 2014 to 2016, she reported having "researched and studied the rich archival material of world-renowned writer and publicist Bogdan Radic for the purpose of compiling his bibliography."

During the premiership of Tihomir Orešković from 22 January to 19 October 2016, she was Deputy Foreign Minister to Miro Kovač. Since 2017 she works at the Croatian Foreign Ministry as state secretary. She is considered one of the closed associates of former Croatian head of state Kolinda Grabar-Kitarović. She was a member of the Croatian diplomatic delegation that visited Russia in 2017, and in the presence of Vladimir Putin and Kolinda Grabar Kitarovic signed a cooperation agreement with Russian Foreign Minister Sergei Lavrov.
