= Davor Škrlec =

Croatian politician (born 1963)

Davor Škrlec MEP
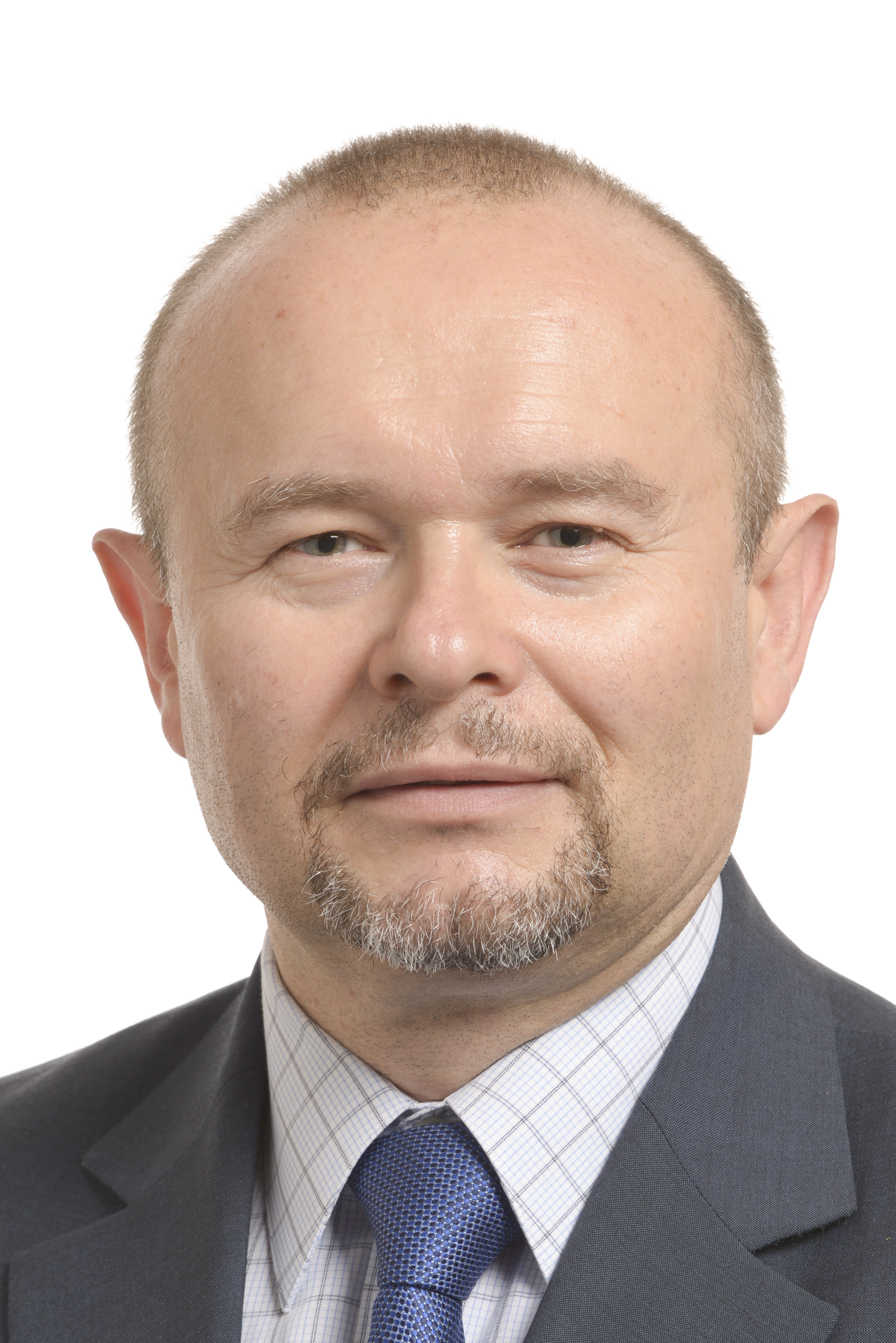

Member of the European Parliament
- In office 1 July 2014 – 2 July 2019
- Constituency: Croatia

Personal details
- Born: 1 January 1963 (age 63) Vinkovci, SR Croatia, SFR Yugoslavia (modern Croatia)
- Citizenship: Croatia
- Party: Sustainable Development of Croatia (2013–2016)
- Occupation: Professor, politician
- Profession: Electrical engineer
- Website: www.davor-skrlec.eu

Davor Škrlec (born 1 January 1963) is a Croatian electrical engineer and liberal politician. He was a Member of the European Parliament (MEP) for Croatia, elected in the 2014 European Parliament election as a member of the Sustainable Development of Croatia party. He is one of the first two green politicians elected to the European Parliament from the newer European Union members, along with Tamás Meszerics (Politics Can Be Different) elected in the 2014 election in Hungary.

In April 2016, Škrlec left ORaH because of "dissatisfaction over how the party is run, and the party's passivity towards the problems of the Croatian society".

Before becoming MEP, he was employed at the Faculty of Electrical Engineering and Computing, University of Zagreb as a full-time professor.
