= Karlo Ressler =

Croatian politician

Karlo Ressler MEP
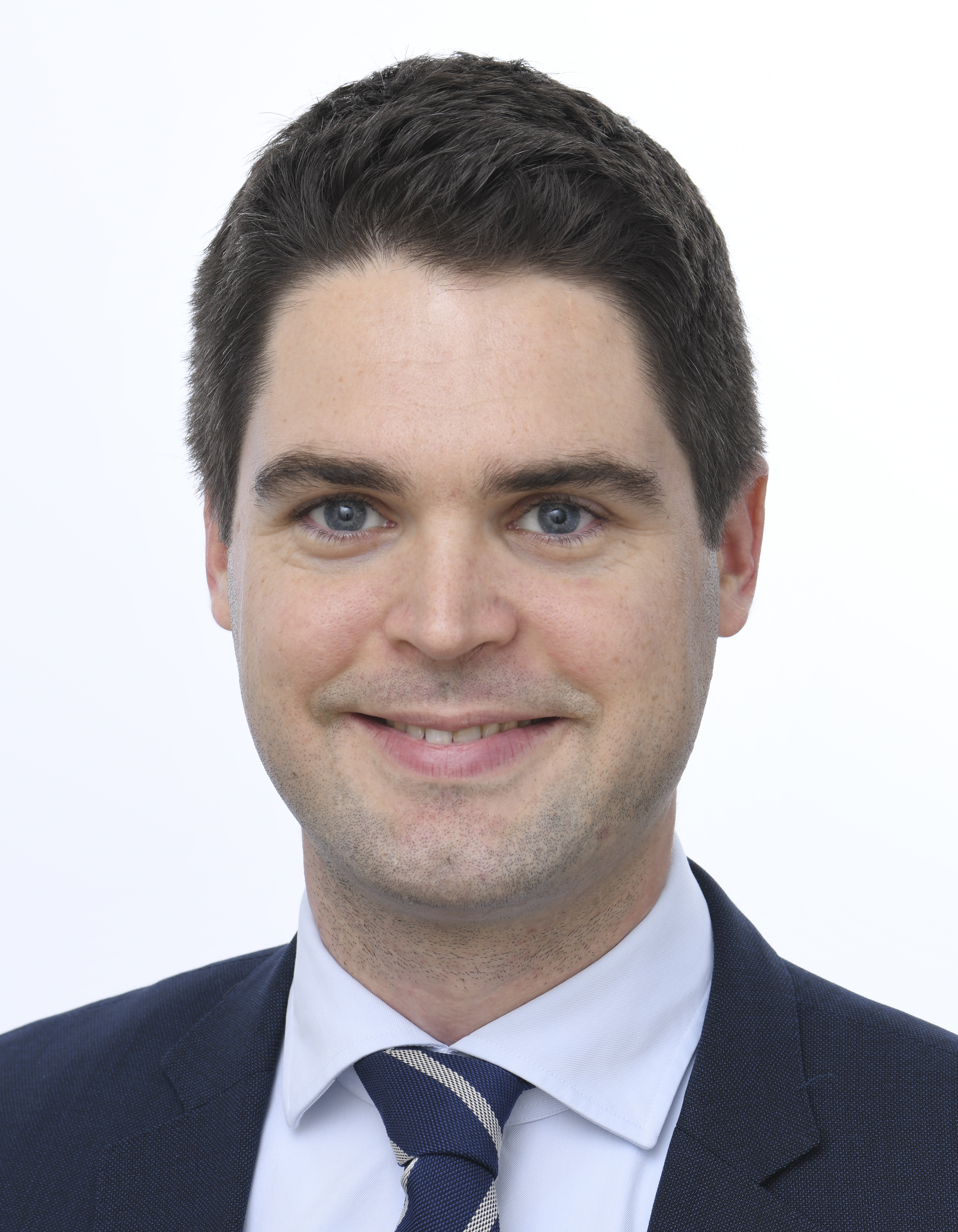

Member of the European Parliament for Croatia
- Incumbent
- Assumed office 2 July 2019

Personal details
- Born: 26 December 1989 (age 36) Zagreb, SR Croatia, SFR Yugoslavia (modern Croatia)
- Party: Croatian; Croatian Democratic Union; EU; European People's Party
- Spouse: Karla Ressler (m. 2014)
- Relations: Vladimir Šeks (stepfather)
- Children: 3
- Education: University of Zagreb
- Website: www.karloressler.eu

Karlo Ressler (born 26 December 1989) is a Croatian politician who has been serving as a Member of the European Parliament since 2019.

== Early life and education ==
Ressler was born in Zagreb. He graduated with honors from the Faculty of Law of the University of Zagreb. He completed his senior year at the University of Sheffield, England, participating in Erasmus Programme. At the Max Planck Institute for Foreign and International Criminal Law in Freiburg, Germany, he is completing his doctorate degree on human trafficking in Southeast Europe.

After graduation in 2014, Ressler started working as an assistant at Zagreb University's Faculty of Law.

== Political career ==
=== Career in national politics ===
Ressler is a member of the Croatian Democratic Union (HDZ) since 2009. From 2013 to 2016, he was an assistant to Andrej Plenković, a member of the European Parliament at the time. When the HDZ won the 2016 parliamentary election, he was appointed as an advisor for legal and political issues to Prime Minister Plenković.

=== Member of the European Parliament, 2019–present ===
Ressler led the HDZ's list for the European Parliament election in May 2019. The HDZ won 4 seats and the highest number of votes with 22.7 percent, while Ressler won the highest number of preferential votes on the HDZ's list; 52,309 total votes (21.71 percent) which was the fourth-best overall score.

In 2017, Ressler led the Working group on the new Statute of the HDZ. Currently, he is a member of the HDZ's Statute Commission and Vice-President of the Party's Judicial Committee. He coordinated the creation of the HDZ's Program "Croatia for Generations" for the 2019 European Parliament elections.

Ressler is the Vice-President of the Youth of the European People's Party (YEPP) for the second term.

Within the Ninth European Parliament, Ressler serves on the Committee on Budgets (BUDG) and the Committee on Civil Liberties, Justice and Home Affairs (LIBE). In this capacity, he has been the parliament's rapporteur on a 2020 law ruling the handling of fingerprints and on the budget of the European Union for 2022.

In addition to his committee assignments, Ressler is part of the parliament's delegation for relations with China. He is also a member of the European Internet Forum and of the URBAN Intergroup.

== See also ==
- List of members of the European Parliament, 2019–2024
