= Sunčana Glavak =

Croatian politician (born 1968)

Sunčana Glavak MEP
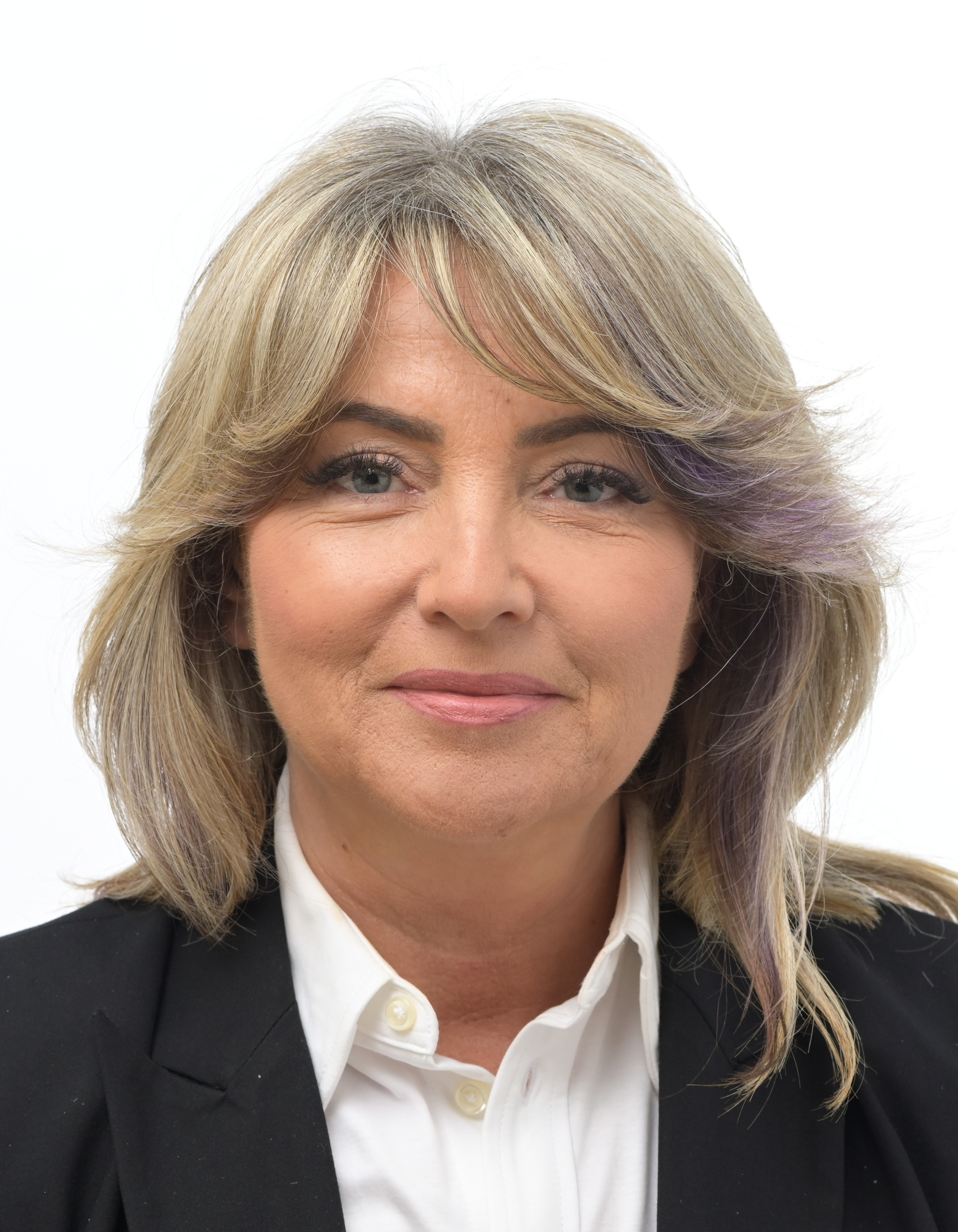

Member of the European Parliament for Croatia
- Incumbent
- Assumed office 1 December 2019
- Preceded by: Dubravka Šuica

Personal details
- Born: 9 December 1968 (age 57) Čakovec, Croatia, Yugoslavia
- Party: Croatian Democratic Union

Sunčana Glavak (born 1968) is a Croatian politician of the Croatian Democratic Union (HDZ) who has been serving as a Member of the European Parliament since 2019.

== Early career ==
During her journalism studies, Glavak began her career as a journalist. She worked as a speaker, presenter and editor at Radio Čakovec.

In 2004, Glavak started working at the Ministry of Culture as a spokesperson for the Ministry and head of its Public Relations Department.

== Political career ==
In the 2007 national elections, Glavak became a member of the Croatian Parliament, representing the HDZ list. However, she suspended her mandate following her appointment as deputy spokesperson of the government led by Prime Minister Ivo Sanader.

In the 2014 presidential election, she was a staff member of Kolinda Grabar-Kitarović's campaign. From 2016, she served as spokesperson for the Government of the Republic of Croatia under successive prime ministers Tihomir Orešković and Andrej Plenković. In 2018, she resigned from this post and returned to the Croatian Parliament, where she replaced Darko Horvat.

Glavak has been serving as a Member of the European Parliament since 2019, succeeding Dubravka Šuica who gave up her seat to join the European Commission. She has since been serving on the Committee on Foreign Affairs. In addition to her committee assignments, she is part of the parliament's delegation for relations with Bosnia and Herzegovina, and Kosovo and of the European Parliament Intergroup on Cancer.
