= Željana Zovko =

Bosnian and Croatian politician (born 1970)

Željana Zovko MEP
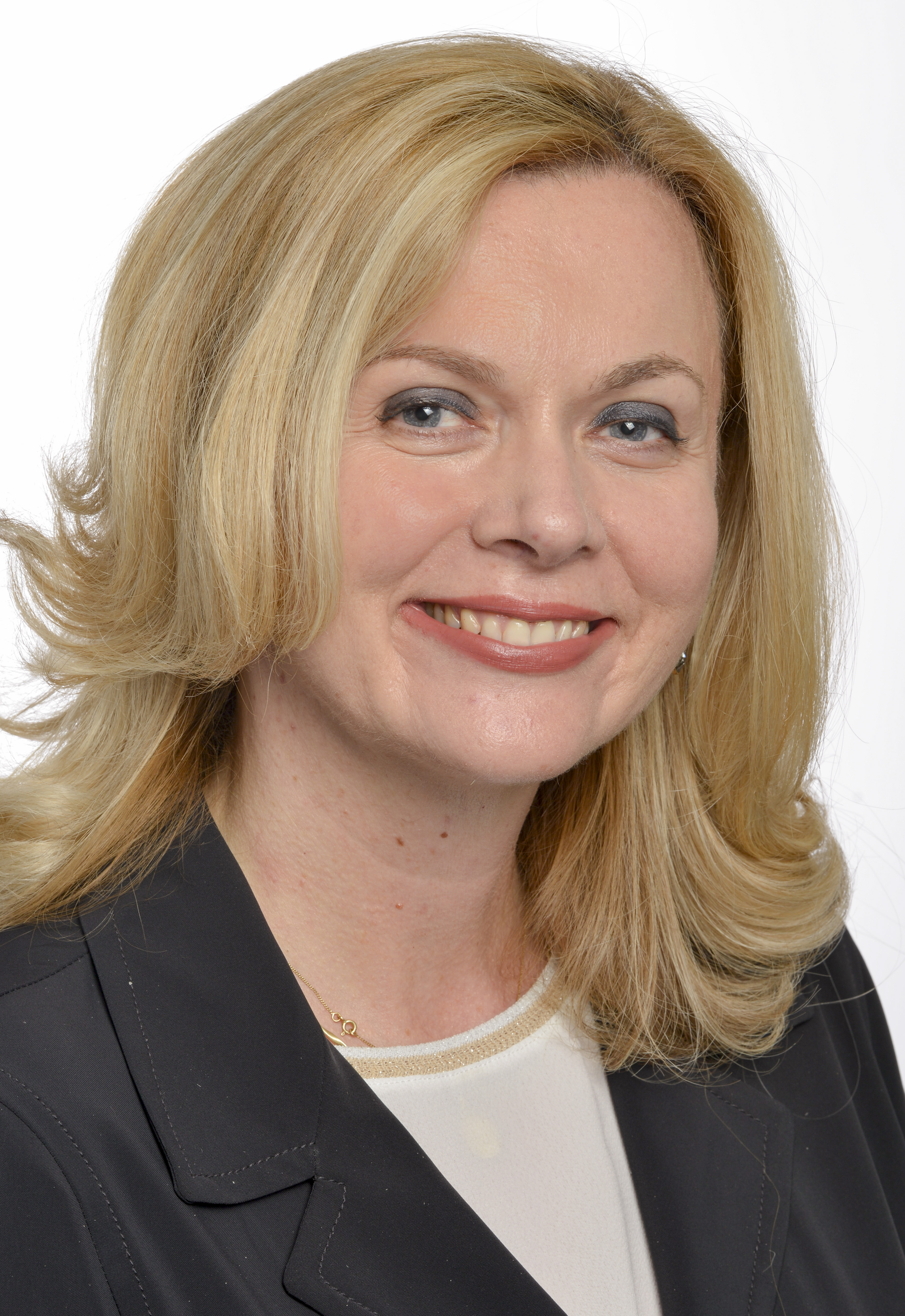
- Official portrait, 2019

Member of the European Parliament for Croatia
- Incumbent
- Assumed office 21 November 2016

Personal details
- Born: 25 March 1970 (age 56) Mostar, SR Bosnia and Herzegovina, SFR Yugoslavia (modern Bosnia and Herzegovina)
- Citizenship: Bosnia and Herzegovina; Croatia
- Party: HDZ BiH; HDZ
- Education: University of North London
- Awards: Crosses of Military Merit with White Decoration (2012)

Željana Zovko (born 25 March 1970) is a Bosnian and Croatian diplomat and politician who has served as a Member of the European Parliament (MEP) from Croatia since 2016. She is a member of the Croatian Democratic Union (HDZ) and the Croatian Democratic Union of Bosnia and Herzegovina (HDZ BiH), both part of the European People's Party.

Previously, Zovko was Bosnia and Herzegovina's Ambassador to France from 2004 to 2008, Ambassador to Spain from 2008 to 2011, and Foreign Affairs Advisor to the Chairman of the Council of Ministers of Bosnia and Herzegovina, Vjekoslav Bevanda, from 2012 to 2015. She also served as Bosnia and Herzegovina's Ambassador to Italy until 2016.

== Early life and education ==
Zovko was born on March 25, 1970, in Mostar. She began studying French language and literature at the Faculty of Humanities, University of Sarajevo in 1989. However, due to the Bosnian War, in 1992 she fled and completed her studies at the University of North London in 1995.

== Political and diplomatic career in Bosnia and Herzegovina ==
Zovko returned to Bosnia and Herzegovina in 1999, working as a public relations associate for the Croat member of the Presidency, Ante Jelavić. She then served as head of the cabinet for another Croat member, Dragan Čović, from 2002 to April 2004.

With political support from Čović, Zovko moved to the diplomatic service and served as the Ambassador of Bosnia and Herzegovina to France from April 2004 to 2008. She then moved on as Bosnian Ambassador to Spain between 2008 and December 2011.

In 2012, Zovko was appointed foreign affairs advisor to Vjekoslav Bevanda, the Chairman of the Council of Ministers of Bosnia and Herzegovina, serving in this role until March 2015. During the same period, she was also the international secretary of the Croatian Democratic Union of Bosnia and Herzegovina (HDZ BiH).

Despite the conflict of interest due to her dual allegiance as a Bosnian diplomat, in May 2014 Zovko contested the 2014 European Parliament election in Croatia on the list of the "Patriotic coalition" of the Croatian Democratic Union. With 2,392 preferential votes, she was not elected.

From August 2015 to November 2016, Zovko served as Bosnia and Herzegovina's Ambassador to Italy.

== Member of the European Parliament ==
Following the 2016 Croatian parliamentary election, MEPs Andrej Plenković and Davor Ivo Stier resigned to form a new government in Croatia. As a result, Zovko replaced Stier in the European Parliament. Her transition from Bosnia and Herzegovina’s diplomatic service to representing Croatian voters in the European Parliament sparked criticism in the media.

During her first term, Zovko served on the Committee on Development, Delegation for relations with Bosnia and Herzegovina and Kosovo, and delegations to the joint parliamentary committees with ACP countries, Armenia, Azerbaijan and Georgia. In October 2017, she was chief observer for the EU election observation mission to Nepal during the legislative election.

Reelected in 2019, Zovko was appointed Vice-Chair and EPP Vice-Coordinator of the Committee on Foreign Affairs. She was actively involved in the Working Groups for the Western Balkans and external financial instruments, and served as Vice-Chair of the Delegation for relations with Bosnia and Herzegovina and Kosovo. Additionally, she was a member of the Delegation for relations with the United States and the Euro-Latin American Parliamentary Assembly, as well as the Committee on Culture and Education and the Subcommittee on Security and Defence. In October 2021, she was elected one of the Vice Presidents of the EPP Group in the European Parliament.

She was reelected at the 2024 elections, currently serving as a member of the Committee on Foreign Affairs, Committee on Fisheries and Delegation for relations with the United States. In June 2024, she was re-elected as one of the Vice Presidents of the EPP Group in the European Parliament.

== Controversies and political positions ==
Zovko claimed that Turkish President Recep Tayyip Erdoğan and the Islamic Community of Bosnia and Herzegovina (IZ BiH) interfered in the 2018 Bosnian general election to support Željko Komšić over her party colleague Dragan Čović. Komšić dismissed Zovko’s claims as "blatant lies and Islamophobia", while the IZ BiH condemned them as a "malicious campaign against the Islamic Community without any proof".

On August 28, 2019, on Twitter, Zovko commemorated the 26th anniversary of the establishment of the Croatian Republic of Herzeg-Bosnia, a self-proclaimed quasi-state, but deleted the post two days later following media backlash.

In March 2021, Zovko was described by the Austrian newspaper Der Standard as "nationalist" and by Austrian MEP Thomas Waitz as "scandalous" for her stance on Bosnia and Herzegovina's electoral law reform.

In January 2024, Zovko presented the Old Bridge in Mostar as "Croatian heritage" at a European Parliament event, sparking strong backlash, particularly from Bosniaks, including from former Mostar mayor Safet Oručević, who labeled it an "embarrassing and dumb provocation" due to the bridge's destruction by the Croatian Defence Council during the Croat–Bosniak War.

She has repeatedly criticized Croatian president Zoran Milanović, and in October 2024, she claimed it was a "fact" that he is financed by the Government of Russia.

In December 2024, at a Croatian Democratic Union conference in Split, Zovko stated, "What is next, President Plenković, what you need to deliver to us? The Presidency of Bosnia and Herzegovina." Her statement was seen by many as a direct attempt to interfere in the internal affairs of a state and further destabilize the relations in the region.

== Awards ==
- Grand Cross of the Order of Military Merit (Spain) by King Juan Carlos I (2012)
