= Marijana Petir =

Croatian politician (born 1975)

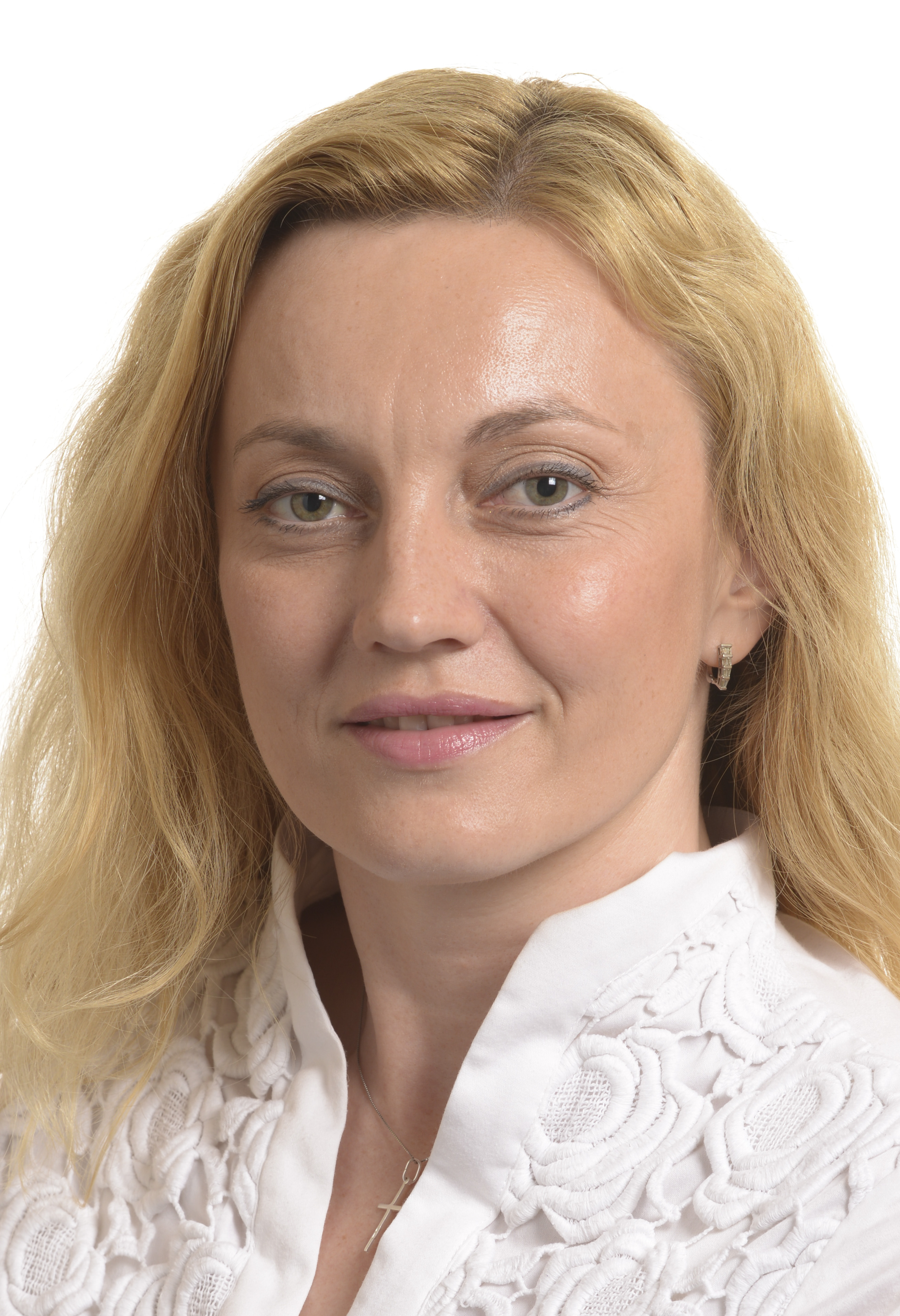

Member of the European Parliament for Croatia
- In office 1 July 2014 – 2 July 2019

Personal details
- Born: 4 October 1975 (age 50) Kutina, SR Croatia, SFR Yugoslavia (modern Croatia)
- Party: Independent (2017–)
- Other political affiliations: Croatian Peasant Party (HSS, until 2017); HDZ-led right-wing coalition

Marijana Petir (born 4 October 1975) is a Croatian politician, former Member of the European Parliament.

== Biography ==
She stems from the village of Mustafina Klada in Moslavina. Petir graduated from the Faculty of Science in Zagreb and the Faculty of Catholic Theology in Zagreb. She also completed postgraduate studies in Nonprofit Management and Social Advocacy at the University of Zagreb.

From 1998 to 2000, Petir led the environmental association "Greens of Moslavina", which fights against the spread of GMOs, and led the Anti-Nuclear Campaign in Moslavina, which successfully opposed the then planned construction of nuclear waste on Moslavacka Gora.

In 2000–2001 she was an intern and then expert associate at Croatia's Ministry of Environmental Protection and Physical Planning.

=== Member of the Croatian Parliament ===
Petir entered the Croatian Parliament for the first time in 2002, at age 26 (the youngest MP), as a joint candidate from the list of the Croatian Peasant Party (HSS), the Liberal Party and the Croatian Social Liberal Party in the 6th constituency. She served from 16 January 2002 to 22 December 2003.

From April 2003 to March 2004, Petir was hired as spokesperson for the HSS. From November 2004 to January 2005 Petir is spokeswoman for the campaign of the President of the Republic of Croatia, Stjepan Mesić in his re-election bid.

From June 2005 to January 2008 Petir holds the position of Deputy Prefect of Sisak-Moslavina County. In that period, she was also the president of the HSS Regional Organization for Central Croatia.

In 2007 Petir is again elected to the Croatian Parliament as representative of the 6th constituency as a joint candidate from the list of the Croatian Peasant Party and the Croatian Social Liberal Party, also chairing the Committee on Environmental Protection, and the HSS parliamentary group. She was removed from the latter position after, on 9 July 2009, she was the only MP to vote against the adoption of Croatia's antidiscrimination law (with the absention of MP Bagarić). The antidiscrimination law was opposed by Croatia's Catholic Church, which saw it as a means of promoting homosexuality, but Ivo Sanader's government managed to ensure the consent of all parliamentary parties - including Petir's HSS.

At the time, right-wing Croatian media spoke of "one and a half Catholics in the Croatian Parliament." For these reasons, in 2011 Petir was named Homophobe of the Decade by Zagreb Pride. Petir retorted that she considered this to be hate speech and perceived them as Christianophobes.

She continued to serve as a Member of Parliament until 2011, when HSS only obtained one parliamentary seat. Petir remained in charge of the HSS County Organization of Sisak-Moslavina County, which she headed since 2002, and as vice-president of the HSS. Since 2008 Petir also served as HSS councilor in the Sisak-Moslavina County Assembly.

During this period she was also the head of the Office for the Social Doctrine of the Church of the Sisak Diocese, and in her capacity as a representative of the Croatian Catholic Bishops’ Conference she took part in the Croatian Parliament's Committee on Human Rights and the Rights of National Minorities.

In the 2013 local elections, she was defeated in her own hometown, in the municipality of Velika Ludina, where she managed to win only 27 percent of the vote.

=== Member of the European Parliament ===
At the 2014 elections, Petir was elected Member of the European Parliament for the joint list HDZ - HSS - HSP AS - BUZ - HDS - ZDS. She received the support of the leaders of the Croatian Peasant Party for her candidacy. She was a member of the Committee on Agriculture and Rural Development, the Committee on Women's Rights and Gender Equality and the Delegation to the EU-Macedonia Joint Parliamentary Committee. In 2019, The Parliament Magazine granted her the "MEP Award" for Agriculture, Rural Development & Fisheries.

Marijana Petir was the organizer of the exhibition "Cardinal Stepinac - Apostle of Hope and Love for God and People" which was held at the European Parliament on June 14, 2016. The Serbian Foreign Ministry sent protest letters stating that "Stepinac is responsible for cooperating with the Ustasha regime."

As a member of the European Parliament, she advocated the release from a Serbian prison of Croatian war veteran Veljko Marić, convicted for war crimes. She also visited him in prison in December 2015.

In May 2017 she took part in the "Walk for Life" in Zagreb, at which she was pictured together with convicted war criminal Dario Kordić.

Following disputes with the new party leader Krešo Beljak, Petir left the HSS in 2017, continuing to serve as an independent MEP in the EPP group until 2019.
