= Sandra Petrović Jakovina =

Croatian politician (born 1985)

Sandra Petrović Jakovina MEP
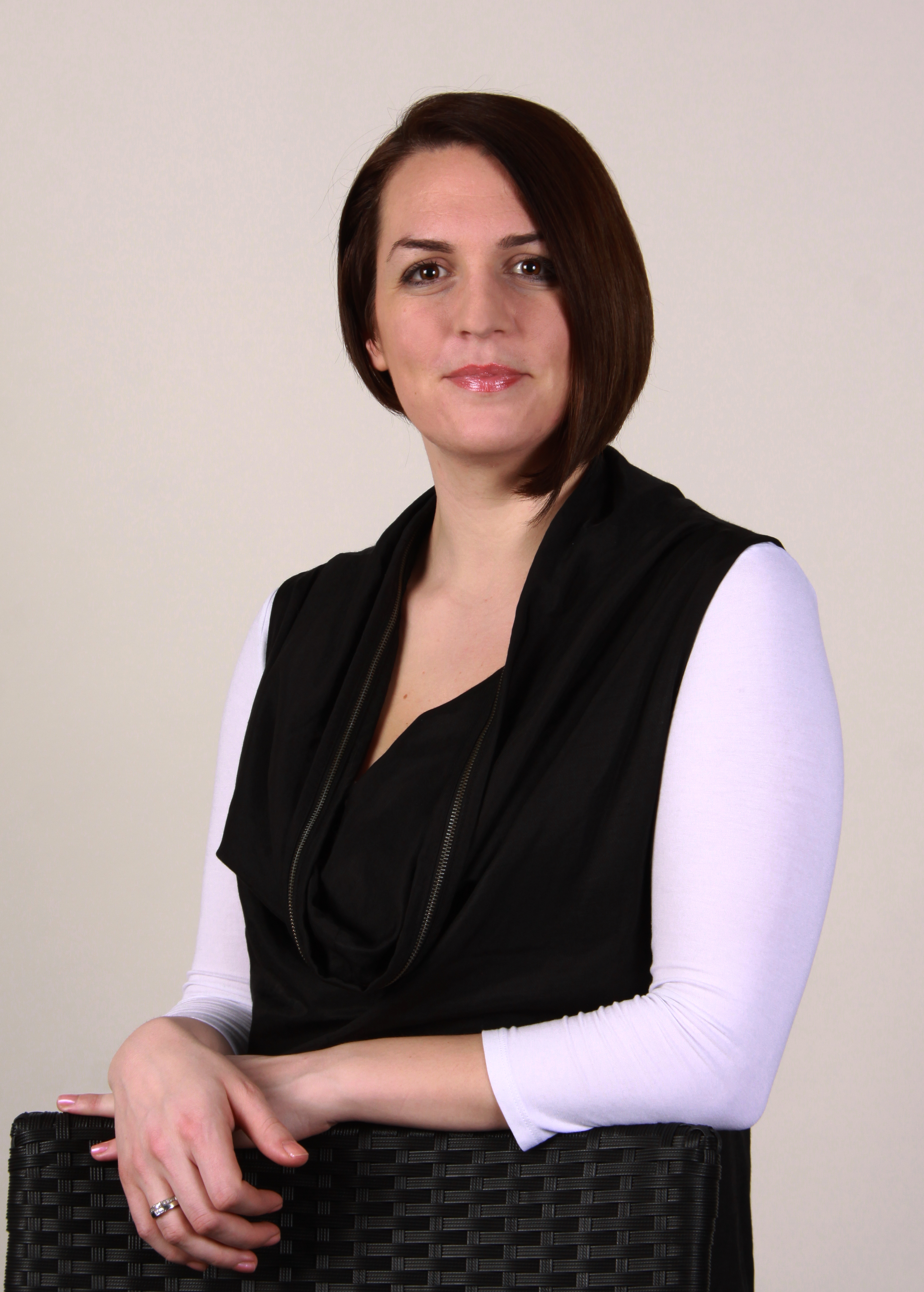

Member of the European Parliament for Croatia
- In office 1 July 2013 – 1 July 2014

Personal details
- Born: 21 March 1985 (age 41) Zagreb, SR Croatia, SFR Yugoslavia (modern Croatia)
- Party: Social Democratic Party of Croatia

Sandra Petrović Jakovina (born 21 March 1985 is a Croatian Member of the European Parliament following the accession of Croatia to the European Union in 2013.

Jakovina is the youngest MEP for the Social Democratic Party of Croatia (SDP). Her husband is Tihomir Jakovina, Minister of Agriculture in the Cabinet of Zoran Milanović, and also a member of the SDP.

She has spoken against tax evasion.
