= Tonino Picula =

Croatian politician (born 1961)

Tonino Picula MEP
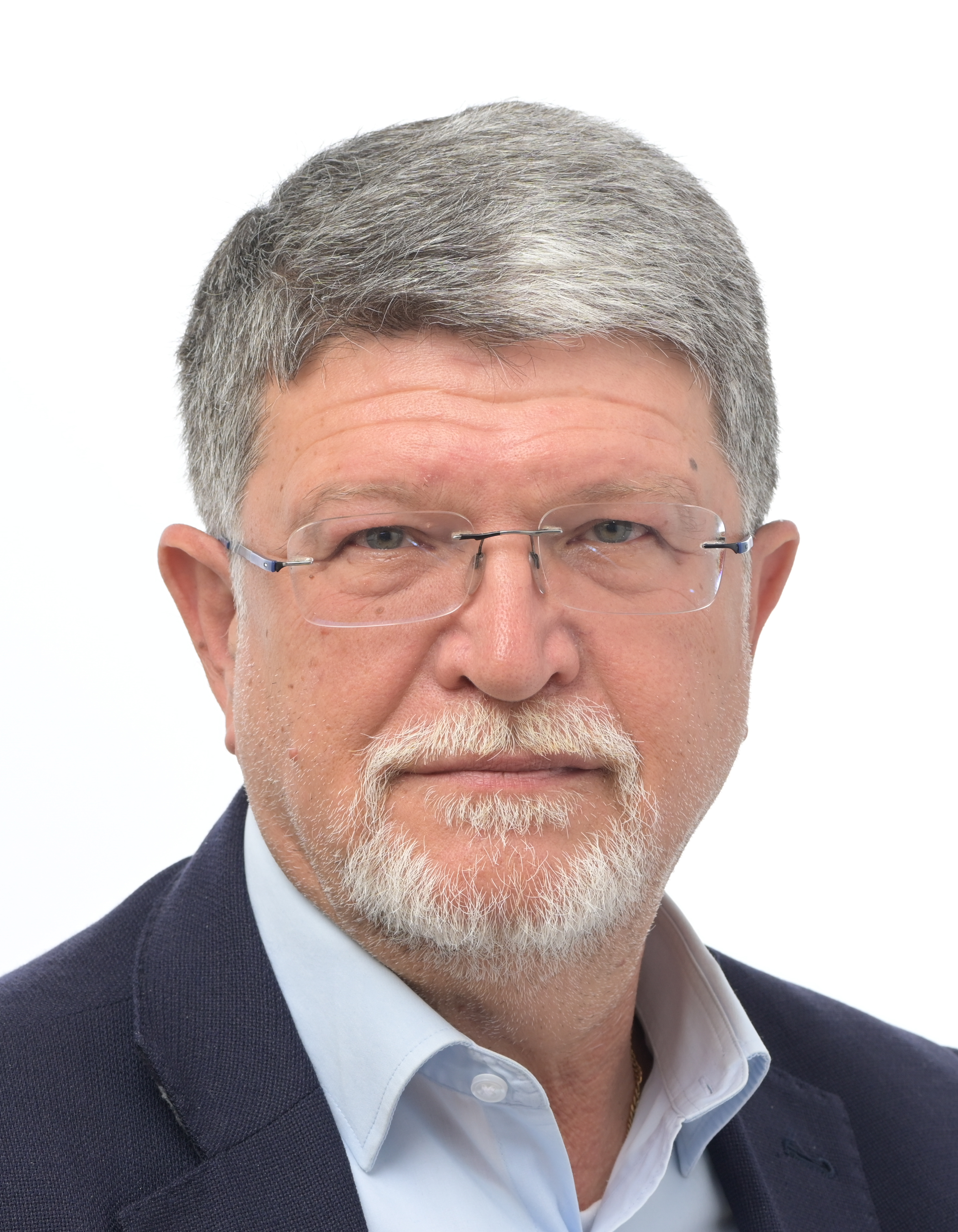
- Official portrait, 2024

Member of the European Parliament for Croatia
- Incumbent
- Assumed office 1 July 2013

Observer of the European Parliament for Croatia
- In office 1 April 2012 – 1 July 2013

Mayor of Velika Gorica
- In office 17 June 2005 – 17 June 2009
- Preceded by: Ivan Šuker
- Succeeded by: Dražen Barišić

Minister of Foreign Affairs
- In office 27 January 2000 – 22 December 2003
- Prime Minister: Ivica Račan
- Preceded by: Mate Granić
- Succeeded by: Miomir Žužul

Personal details
- Born: 31 August 1961 (age 65) Mali Lošinj, PR Croatia, FPR Yugoslavia (modern Croatia)
- Party: Social Democratic Party; Progressive Alliance of Socialists and Democrats
- Spouse: Marijana Mikić
- Children: 1
- Education: University of Zagreb (Faculty of Humanities and Social Sciences)
- Website: Official website

Tonino Picula (pronounced [tonǐːno pît͡sula]; born 31 August 1961) is a Croatian politician currently serving his fourth term as a Member of the European Parliament for Croatia, having previously run in 2013, 2014, 2019 and 2024 European elections.

Picula entered Croatian politics in the early 1990s in recently formed democratic Croatia and had served four consecutive terms as a member of the Croatian Parliament, having been elected in the 2000, 2003, 2007, and 2011 parliamentary elections as a member of the center-left Social Democratic Party (SDP). He served as Minister of Foreign Affairs from 2000 to 2003 under prime minister Ivica Račan, and as mayor of Velika Gorica from 2005 to 2009.

Picula is a member of the center-left Social Democratic Party (SDP) and sits with the Progressive Alliance of Socialists & Democrats in the European Parliament.

== Early life and education ==
Picula was born in Mali Lošinj and completed both primary and secondary education in Šibenik, Dalmatia. In 1986, he graduated in sociology from the Faculty of Humanities and Social Sciences, University of Zagreb and earned the title of professor of sociology. From 1987 to 1989, he worked as an associate axpert at the Croatian Parliament of Culture and secretary of the magazine Kulturni radnik, after which he worked for a year as an associate expert at the Center for Idea-Theoretical Work. With the independence of the Republic of Croatia and the beginning of the Croatian War for Independence, he actively engaged in its defence as a member of the Armed Forces.

He is married and has a daughter with his wife Marijana.

== Political career ==
=== Career in national politics ===
After the 2000 parliamentary elections in which SDP, under Ivica Račan, won in a broad coalition, Picula was appointed Minister of Foreign Affairs and served a full term until 2003. During his term in office, Croatia achieved several developments in its foreign relations, including obtaining candidate status for membership in the North Atlantic Treaty Organization (NATO) and the European Union, and joining the World Trade Organization. He signed the Stabilization and Association Agreement on behalf of the Croatian government, and submitted the country's application for membership in the European Union. He also signed, on behalf of Croatia, the Agreement on Succession Issues of the Former Socialist Federal Republic of Yugoslavia, following a prolonged period of negotiations, disagreements, and delays.

In the 2005 local elections, he was elected mayor of Velika Gorica. He also served as president of the SDP branch in Velika Gorica from 1997 to 2000.

From 2004 to 2008, he served as president of the SDP Main Committee, and subsequently as a member of the party’s Presidency for four years. He has been elected as a member of the Croatian Parliament in every parliamentary election since 2000. In Parliament, he served as chair of the Committee on Foreign Policy and as a member of the Committee for the Constitution, Rules of Procedure and Political System, the Committee for Interparliamentary Cooperation, the Committee for War Veterans, and the Committee for European Integration.

Since 2003, he has been the head of the Delegation of the Croatian Parliament to the OSCE Parliamentary Assembly, where he has been active for ten years. In the period from 2010 to 2011, he was the rapporteur of the Committee for Political and Security Affairs of the OSCE PA, and from 2011 to 2014, he held the position of Vice-President of the OSCE Parliamentary Assembly. He was appointed as a special coordinator and head of OSCE observation missions to the parliamentary and presidential assemblies in Moldova (2010), Kazakhstan (2011), Russia (2012), Georgia (2012) and Armenia (2013).

After the end of Croatian negotiations for EU membership, Tonino Picula became an observer of the Croatian Parliament in the European Parliament, while in the first Croatian elections for the European Parliament in 2013, he was elected with the largest number of preferential votes.

In the first and in the last European parliamentary elections in the Republic of Croatia (2013, 2014, 2019 and 2024), Tonino Picula was elected by the direct will of the citizens - preferential votes.

Named the most influential Croatian member of the European Parliament twice, in 2020 and 2023. According to the explanation of the EU Matrix, Picula was among the first 100 thanks to his work in the field of EU foreign and cohesion policy.

In 2024, he was declared the most influential in the field of foreign policy, and the 28th most influential MEP out of a total of 705 MEPs in the European Parliament.

== Member of the European Parliament, 2013–present ==
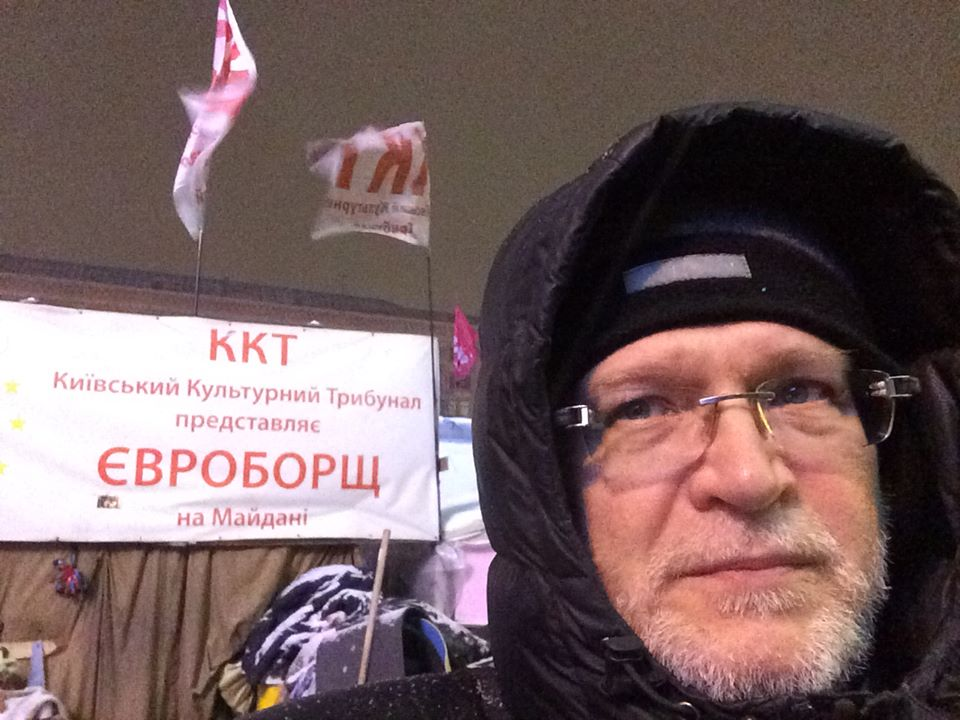
Picula in Maidan Nezalezhnosti, Kyiv, in 2014

On 1 April 2012, as part of preparations for Croatia's full EU membership, Sabor appointed Picula to the European Parliament as one of the 12 "observer" members from Croatia. At the first Croatian European Parliament elections in 2013, he was elected to the remainder of the Parliament's 2009–2014 term, and then again in 2014, 2019, and 2024. term.

From the first term MEP Tonino Picula defined two main areas in which he would act during his mandate: the affirmation of Adriatic Croatia as a European region with great potential and, in foreign policy, participation in the creation of European policy towards the southeast of Europe, a region of special interest for Croatia.

During all his mandates, he did not limit himself to those two areas, but acted more broadly, trying to contribute where possible to protect Croatian interests. Some of the topics covered by representative Picula are:

=== Foreign Policy ===
Picula has been a member of the Committee on Foreign Affairs (AFET) since 2013 where he currently serves as a senior member responsible for coordinating the work of the Socialists and Democrats in the Committee. He is a substitute member of the Delegation for relations with the United States of America (D-US), and as such, in June 2020, had been appointed the European Parliament’s first standing rapporteur for relations with the USA.

Picula has been a strong proponent of the EU enlargement, and has held it is EU’s most successful policy and most powerful tool for promoting democracy, prosperity and peace. In November 2019, AFET appointed him to the position of the Rapporteur for Recommendations on the Western Balkans ahead of the May 2020 Summit in Zagreb. The key recommendations of the Report were to ensure that the improved negotiation methodology has the full EU membership as its ultimate goal and that the EU provides clear and predictable rules and criteria and applies them consistently, thereby restoring its credibility. His dedication to EU – Western Balkans relations is also reflected in his memberships in the Delegation for relations with Bosnia and Herzegovina, and Kosovo (DSEE) as well as in the Delegation for relations with Serbia. In 2019 he was named Co-Rapporteur for IPA III Financial Instrument for Pre-Accession Assistance and Standing Rapporteur on Montenegro. As of January 2020 he is also the Chairman of the Working Group for the Western Balkans, one of the five AFET working groups.

In the current 9th parliamentary term, he was a substitute member in the Subcommittee on Security and Defence (SEDE) in the first half of the term, and a full member of the then newly founded Special Committee on Foreign Interference in all Democratic Processes in the European Union, including Disinformation, and the Delegation to the Euronest Parliamentary Assembly (PA).

As vice-president of the Delegation of the European Parliament for relations with Southeast Europe, Tonino Picula went on his first official mission to Albania and Kosovo, and also stayed in Bosnia and Herzegovina, Macedonia and Montenegro. He cooperated with fellow deputies to resolve the long-standing crisis in BiH and the issue of institutional equality of Croats in BiH. Due to the deterioration of the political and security situation, he stayed in Kyiv and Kharkiv three times as part of the Ad hoc Delegation of the European Parliament. At the invitation of the Office of the European Parliament in Washington, he presented Croatia's entry into the EU during talks at the State Department, the Pentagon, Congress, the World Bank and foreign policy foundations.

During the 2019–2024 mandate, Picula was particularly active in the areas of foreign policy, security, and defence. He authored or co-authored ten reports directly related to these topics, focusing on issues such as the European Union’s strategic autonomy, its relations with the United States, and the development of an independent role for the EU in global affairs.

As the EP's permanent rapporteur for relations with the United States, he signed two reports with recommendations to the European Council and the Commission on how to position themselves in relations with the US. Also, he was responsible for the authorship of the Report on the new EU enlargement strategy adopted in 2023, and the earlier report on enlargement to the Western Balkans. Both reports are key documents for the future and security of Croatia, as a currently exposed EU border member.

Also, Picula was the author of the Report on cohesion policy and regional strategies for the fight against climate change: as administrative units, regions are a particularly important lever in the fight against climate change, and the fight itself is crucial for the long-term security future of the EU. Namely, climate changes, such as droughts that destroy crops and change landscapes, are one of the key drivers of migration, both now and in the future.

As president of the Working Group for the Western Balkans in the EP, author of the Report on the New European Union Enlargement Strategy, as rapporteur for Montenegro, and co-rapporteur of the EP for the Growth Plan for the Western Balkans worth 6 billion euros, he makes a key contribution to the European integration of the Western Balkan region, with a special focus on Montenegro. In the mandate 2019-2024. as the main reporteur, he was the author of three reports on Montenegro's progress towards EU membership.

Picula had a central role in the management of the Instrument for Pre-Accession Assistance (IPA III) worth 14.2 billion euros for the period 2021-2027, intended to support candidate and potential candidate countries, including Montenegro, Albania, Bosnia and Herzegovina, Kosovo, North Macedonia, Serbia and Turkey. The focus of IPA III is on key reforms in the rule of law, economic transformations and harmonization with European standards, with the aim of strengthening democracy, socio-economic development and regional cooperation.

==== Strategy against aggression on Ukraine ====
As the coordinator of S&D in the field of foreign policy, Tonino Picula played a key role in creating the Resolution on Russian aggression against Ukraine. In his capacity as chief negotiator, Picula had a decisive influence on the Resolution which clearly condemned the invasion of Ukraine and supported its resistance to the aggressor. Picula visited Mariupol and Zaporizhzhia immediately before the Russian invasion and Kyiv twice during the war.

The resolution encouraged diplomatic efforts to stop the aggression, provide urgent humanitarian aid to Ukraine and strengthen its defense capabilities. Picula was actively involved in promoting European defense cooperation and support to Ukraine, which led to concrete proposals to strengthen European defense capabilities.

Picula's work on the Resolution on Russian aggression against Ukraine emphasizes the need for a decisive response by the European Union to external challenges, which contributed to strengthening Ukraine's position and promoting the fundamental values on which the European Union rests - democracy, justice and respect for international law.

=== Regional Development and Islands Policy ===
Picula has dedicated much of his parliamentary work to regional development policies with a particular emphasis on European islands. In 2014, he helped establish the European Parliament Intergroup on Seas, Rivers, Islands and Coastal Areas (SEARICA). After serving a full term as its Vice-Chair in charge of islands, he was elected its Chair in 2019. Picula gained prominence as island policy champion when in 2016 he secured 2 million EUR for establishing the Clean Energy for EU Islands (CE4EUI) Secretariat through an amendment to the EU budget. In 2019, Picula proposed two additional amendments worth a total of 4 million euros. After an evaluation by the Commission and lengthy negotiations within the European Parliament and with the Council, Picula secured additional 2 million EUR for the CE4EUI Secretariat, and new 2 million EUR for the same model to be applied to all rural areas. Success of these initiatives led to signing of The Memorandum of Split calling for a long-term framework for cooperation to advance the energy transition for European islands, and the inclusion of the Clean Energy for EU Islands Initiative in the European Green Deal.

Picula has also been appointed EP Rapporteur for cohesion policy commitments on climate change, which will be one of the most important tools in the coming years when it comes to monitoring whether taxpayers' money is really invested in energy and environmentally sustainable projects and businesses. He is a substitute member of the Committee on Regional Development (REGI) and Committee on Agriculture and Rural Development (AGRI), and a member of the European Parliament Intergroup on the Welfare and Conservation of Animals.

=== Protection of Croatian products and producers ===
In August 2013, MEP Picula asked the European Commission to clarify the situation regarding Croatian autochthonous wines: Prošek and Teran. He pointed out that these are Croatian products whose production is the result of a centuries-old tradition, and whose geographical origin is unquestionable. The position of the Commission was also sought regarding the objection filed by Slovenia related to the Croatian proposal for the registration of Istrian prosciutto. In March 2014, in the European Parliament, he organized the conference and exhibition "Adriatic - colors of originality", where 15 small producers of indigenous Croatian delicacies were informed about product protection at the European level and presented their products in Europe.

The representative Picula helped Teran acquire the protection of authenticity, while the fight for the protection of Prošek is still ongoing. As part of the campaign for the protection of Prošek, he organized numerous informational activities as well as blind tasting tests to show a clear difference between Croatian Prošek and Italian Prosecco (Italy objected to the Croatian registration of the traditional name Prošek because they consider it to be a copy of their Prosecco).

Representative Picula tried to protect small producers in several debates in the European Parliament, warning the institutions to respect the will of the majority that is against GMO production, citing the example of Croatian honey producers who do it in a natural and safe way in a clean environment. He also supported the rejection of the Commission's proposal in the discussion on the production and making available on the market of seeds and other plant reproductive material, as this would contribute to an additional oligopoly of the largest companies.

Picula, as a substitute member of the Committee for Agriculture and Rural Development (AGRI), organized a round table in Zagreb dedicated to the new European Union regulation on labels of origin, which also has an impact on the future of the Croatian Prošek case. The regulation, which is now consolidated into a single legal act, aims to simplify and strengthen the protection of geographical indications and traditional specialties and to strengthen the role of producers in the protection of their products.

Participating in discussions on the European Fisheries Fund and asking questions to the European Commission about the allocation of funds to Croatian fishermen, he also warned about the problem of small fishermen whose category is being abolished in accordance with negotiations on EU membership. He called on the European institutions to adjust the legislation in order to preserve the unique heritage of small-scale fishing, and as a continuation of that initiative, he organized a TV panel in Brussels, where representative Guido Milana, vice-president of the Fisheries Committee, announced a revision of European legislation that will elaborate the special nature of small-scale fishing.

=== Parliamentary activities ===
During the 7th and 8th Parliamentary terms he served as the Chair of the European Parliament delegation for relations with Bosnia and Herzegovina, and Kosovo (2014–2019), substitute member of the Delegation to the EU-Serbia Stabilisation and Association Parliamentary Committee (2014–2019), and was responsible on behalf of the S&D Group for a number of reports such as those on the Accession Agreements with Ukraine and with Northern Macedonia, and the European Defence Union. He was briefly a substitute member of Committee on Petitions (PETI), and Delegation to the Parliamentary Assembly of the Union for the Mediterranean in 2013 and 2014. From 2014 until 2017, he was also a member of the Subcommittee on Security and Defence (SEDE).

- Committee on Foreign Affairs (AFET) 2013 - 2024
- Subcommittee on Security and Defence (SEDE) 2014 - 2022
- Delegation for relations with Bosnia and Herzegovina, and Kosovo (DSEE) 2013 - 2024
- Delegation to the Euronest Parliamentary Assembly (DEPA) 2014 – 2024
- Committee on Regional Development (REGI) 2014 – 2023
- Delegation to the EU-Serbia Stabilisation and Association Parliamentary Committee (D-RS) 2014 - 2024
- Delegation for relations with the United States (D-US) 2020 - 2024
- Committee on Agriculture and Rural Development (AGRI) 2020 - 2024
- Committee on Economic and Monetary Affairs (ECON) 2023 - 2024

=== Office projects ===
==== Watersaving challenge ====
The project was started by MEP Picula in collaboration with Christian Pleijel from the Royal Institute of Technology in Stockholm with the aim of promoting the concept of smart islands and establishing them as a source of sustainable water saving solutions. The project did not consider increasing the water supply as a solution to the problem, but ways to reduce the demand for water - so the focus was not on the consequences but on the causes of the shortage.

8 European islands participated in it (two each from Croatia, Greece, Ireland and France), and already in the first year (2017) it received the Greening the Islands Award! As the crown of the research and the result of the analysis, a Guide for smart water management was created, as well as an interactive website that guided the interested island municipalities through the water saving project. Picula's office actively assisted all island communities on this path until 2022, when the project formally ended.

==== Fighting the fake news ====
Two of Tonino Picula's initiatives are aimed at combating misinformation and promoting media literacy, among young people and among the retired population. The goal was to raise awareness of the consequences of the spread of misinformation and encourage the development of critical thinking.

"Kidalica lažnih vijesti" reached over one hundred thousand young people - as part of the project, informative events and prize competitions were organized, with a focus on educating young people in recognizing and verifying information, rewarding the most successful with a study visit to Brussels.

"Hodalica kroz lažne vijesti" continued its educational mission, focusing on the elderly population. Through lectures and educational films, senior citizens were educated on recognizing fake news and misinformation, with a special emphasis on digital literacy. In six retirement homes across Croatia, including Rijeka, Vrgorac, Zadar, Zagreb, Šibenik and Konavle, the lectures were attended by as many as 350 seniors. The project also included the prize competition "Send a nona (grandma) or a dida (grandpa) to Brussels", promoting inter-generational cooperation. Nick's Titanic caricatures added a humorous element to the campaign, making education more accessible.

== Recognition ==
In 2017, The Water Saving Project, initiated and coordinated with the European Small Island Federation and funded by MEP Picula, was awarded the “Greening the Islands Award”. The project aimed at taking action at the other end of the water problem: instead of encouraging water production, it aimed to reduce the use of freshwater through clever communication, smart engineering and wise governance, keeping in mind possible disadvantages such measures might have on people and businesses. The project initially gathered 8 islands from 4 different EU member states: Lastovo and Vis from Croatia, Houat and Sein from France, Ithaka and Tilos from Greece, Cape Clear and Inis Oirr from Ireland.

In 2018, Picula was voted “MEP of the year” by the European Small Island Federation, an organization representing 359,000 islanders on 1,640 small European islands.

In 2020, Picula was nominated for the Energy Award by the Parliament Magazine.

Political offices
Preceded by Mate Granić	Minister of Foreign Affairs; 2000–2003	Succeeded by Miomir Žužul
Preceded by Franjo Sever	Mayor of Velika Gorica; 2005–2009	Succeeded by Dražen Barišić
