= Ivana Maletić =

Croatian politician (born 1973)

Ivana Maletić MEP
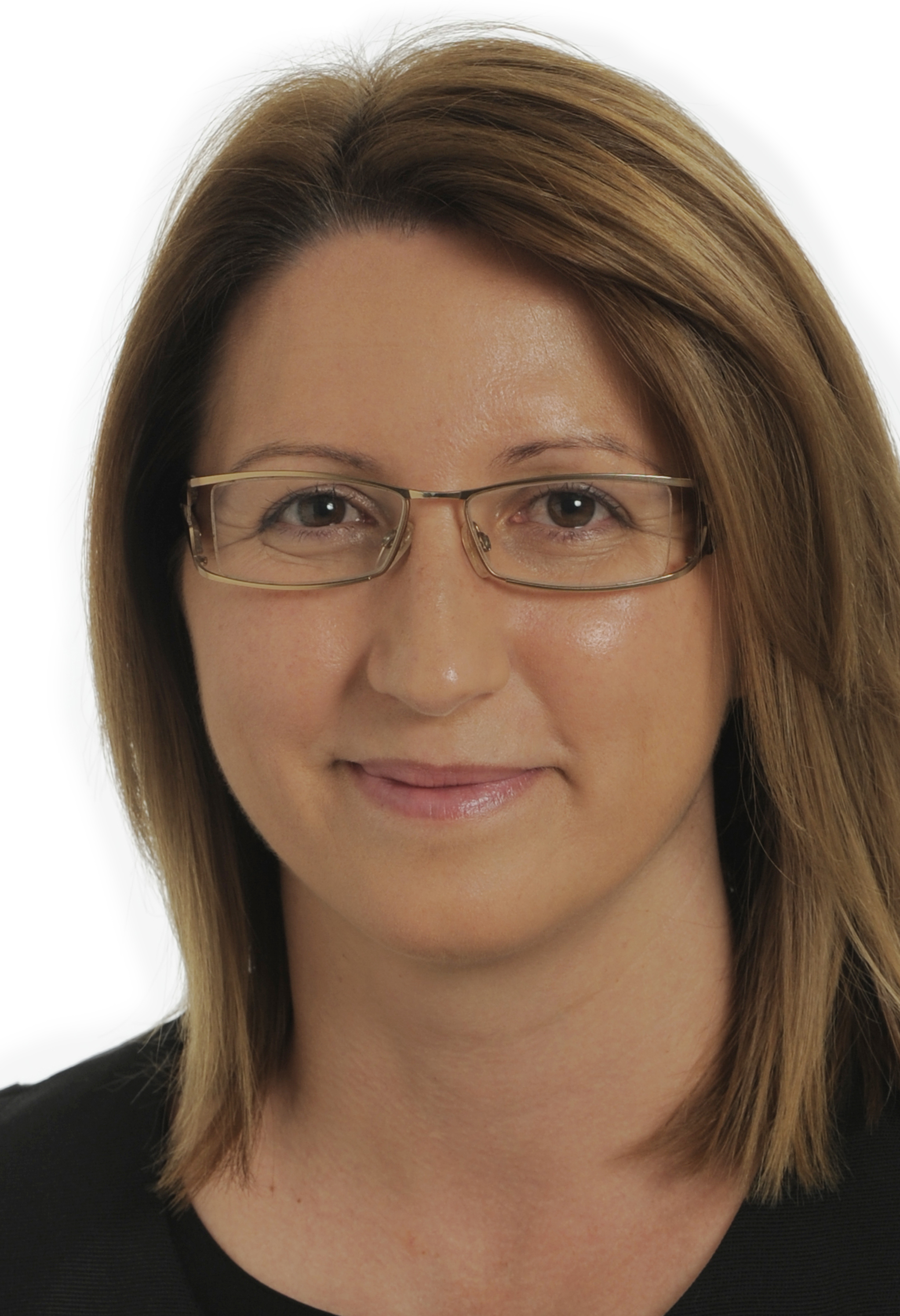
- In office 1 July 2013 – 2019

Personal details
- Born: 12 October 1973 (age 52) Šibenik, SR Croatia, SFR Yugoslavia (modern Croatia)
- Party: Croatian: Croatian Democratic Union (HDZ); EU: European People's Party (EPP)

Ivana Maletić (born 12 October 1973) is a Croatian Democratic Union politician who served as Member of the European Parliament from 2013 until 2019. She is currently a Member of the European Court of Auditors (Chamber IV) based in Luxembourg (Luxembourg).

== Education and early career ==
Maletić is a graduate of the Faculty of Economics and Business, University of Zagreb, and prior to her election she held various positions in the Croatian Ministry of Finance and was a member of the team that negotiated Croatia's accession to the EU.

== Member of the European Parliament, 2013–2019 ==
Following Croatia's accession to the European Union in 2013, Maletić was elected as one of the first group of Croatian members of the European Parliament. Throughout her time in parliament, she served on the Committee on Economic and Monetary Affairs. In addition, she was a member of the parliament's delegation to the EU-Macedonia Joint Parliamentary Committee from 2014 until 2019.
