= Dubravka Šuica =

Croatian politician (born 1957)

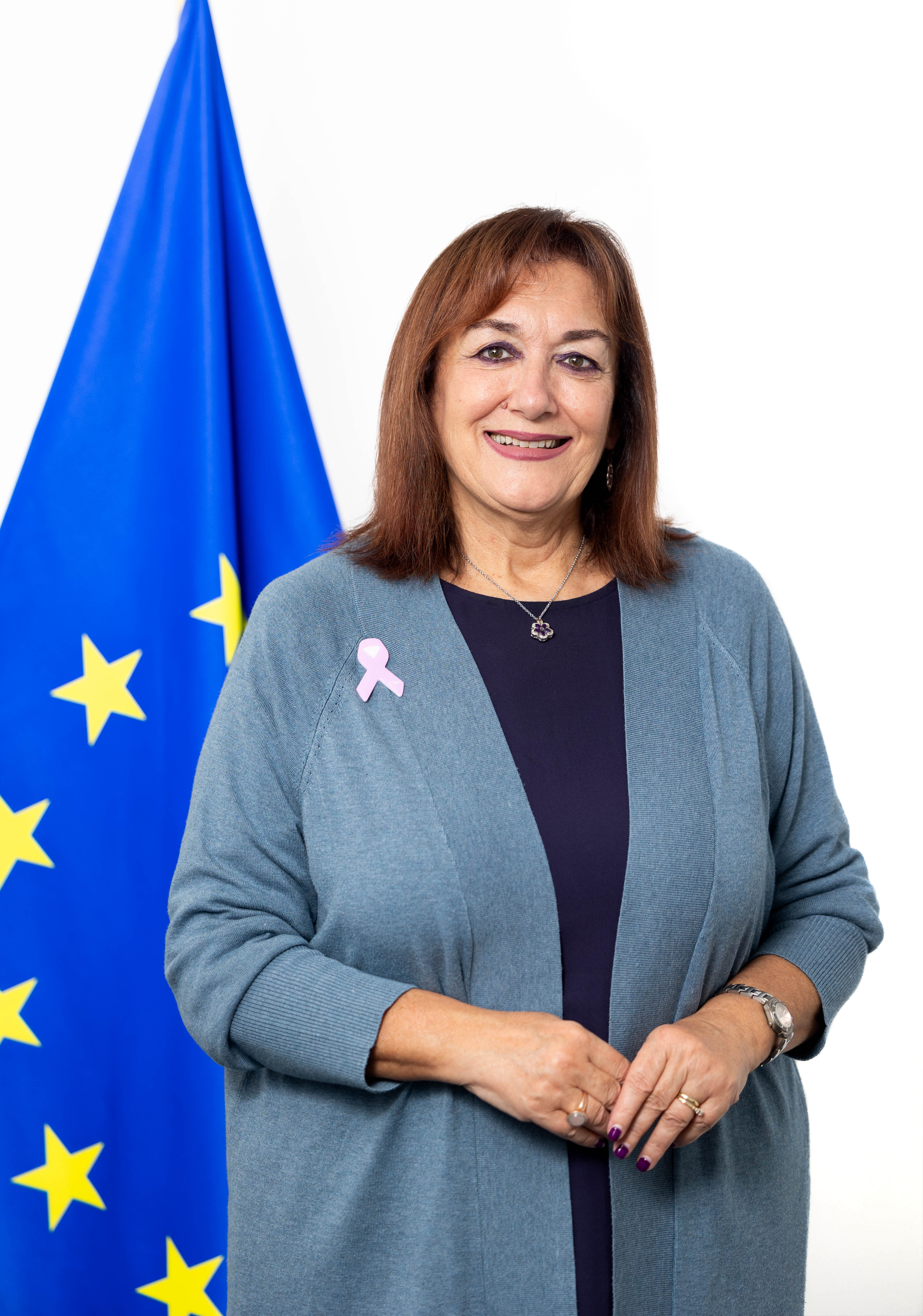
- Official portrait, 2024

European Commissioner for Mediterranean
- Incumbent
- Assumed office 1 December 2024
- Commission: Von der Leyen II
- Preceded by: Position established

Vice President of the European Commission for Democracy and Demography
- In office 1 December 2019 – 1 December 2024
- Commission: Von der Leyen I
- Preceded by: Position established
- Succeeded by: Disbursed among 2 commissioners

Member of the European Parliament for Croatia
- In office 1 July 2013 – 30 November 2019
- Succeeded by: Sunčana Glavak

Mayor of Dubrovnik
- In office 25 May 2001 – 30 June 2009
- Preceded by: Vido Bogdanović
- Succeeded by: Andro Vlahušić

Member of the Croatian Parliament
- In office 2 February 2000 – 22 December 2011
- Constituency: X electoral district

Personal details
- Born: Dubravka Luetić; 20 May 1957 (age 69) Dubrovnik, PR Croatia, FPR Yugoslavia (modern Croatia)
- Party: Croatian Democratic Union (since 1990)
- Other political affiliations: European People's Party (since 2013)
- Spouse: Stijepo Šuica
- Children: 1
- Education: University of Zagreb

Dubravka Šuica (Croatian pronunciation: [ˈduːbravka ˈʃujtsa]; née Luetić; born 20 May 1957) is a Croatian politician of the centre-right Croatian Democratic Union (HDZ) who was Vice-President of the European Commission and the Commissioner for Democracy and Demography from 2019 to 2024. She previously served as a member of the European Parliament from 2013 to 2019. Since December 2024 she serves as the European Commissioner for Mediterranean in the Von der Leyen Commission II.

She served two consecutive terms as mayor of Dubrovnik between 2001 and 2009. She was the first female mayor of Dubrovnik and one of the first female mayors of major Croatian cities in modern Croatia. She served as a member of the Croatian Parliament in three terms from 2001 to 2011. Since 2004, she has been elected five times in a row as vice-president of the Congress of Local and Regional Authorities of the Council of Europe. In October 2012, she was elected vice-president of the EPP Women's association and in June 2019 vice-president of the EPP's EU parliament group.

== Biography ==
Dubravka Šuica was born in Dubrovnik. She graduated from the Zagreb Faculty of Humanities and Social Sciences in 1981, majoring in English and literature and German language.

Before her political career, Dubravka Šuica worked for 20 years as a high school teacher, university professor and principal in Dubrovnik. She became active in politics in 1990, joining Croatian Democratic Union (HDZ) before the first democratic elections in Croatia. Since 1998, she served as head of HDZ Dubrovnik branch up until 2014.

In 2001, Šuica was elected as first ever female mayor of Dubrovnik. She was re-elected in 2005 and served as the mayor till 2009.

She was elected as the member of Croatian Parliament three times, in the 2000, 2003 and 2007 parliamentary elections. She held several positions in Croatian Parliament Committees. She was Chairwoman of the committee, Family, Youth and Sports (2000–2003) and also vice-chairwoman of the Committee on European Affairs during the Croatia's accession period (2007–2011).

In 2004, Dubravka Šuica was elected one of the vice-presidents of the Congress of Local and Regional Authorities of the Council of Europe. She was reelected to that position in 2006, 2008, 2010 and 2012.

In May 2012, Dubravka Šuica was elected vice-president of the HDZ at the national level. She was also the president of the Foreign and European Affairs Committee of HDZ.

In October 2012, she was elected vice-president of EPP Women and she still holds this position.

In the 2013 European election, Dubravka Šuica was elected Member of the European Parliament. She was sworn in on 1 July 2013, after Croatia joined the European Union. She was re-elected MEP following the 2014 European election, placing 2nd on the HDZ list. She served as one of the deputy chairs of the EP's Delegation for relations with Bosnia and Herzegovina, and Kosovo (DSEE), as well as taking part in various committees such as ENVI, AFET where she served as vice-president from 2016 to 2019, TRAN, FEMM and the Delegation for relations with the United States (D-US).

Dubravka Šuica was re-elected MEP at the 2019 election, for the third consecutive time.

In June 2019, she was elected as first vice-president of the European People's Party (EPP) in European Parliament. As of 2013 to 2019, she was also head of the Croatian EPP delegation in the Parliament.

In August 2019, Dubravka Šuica was nominated as a candidate for European Commissioner from Croatia, and on 10 July 2019 President-elect Ursula von der Leyen assigned her the role of Vice-President designate for Democracy and Demography. From 1 December 2019 to 1 December 2024, she was Vice President of the European Commission and the Commissioner for Democracy and Demography.

Political offices
Preceded by Neven Mimica	Croatian European Commissioner; 2019–present	Incumbent
Preceded by Vido Bogdanović	Mayor of Dubrovnik; 2001–2009	Succeeded by Andro Vlahušić
