= Romana Jerković =

Croatian politician (born 1964)

Romana Jerković MEP
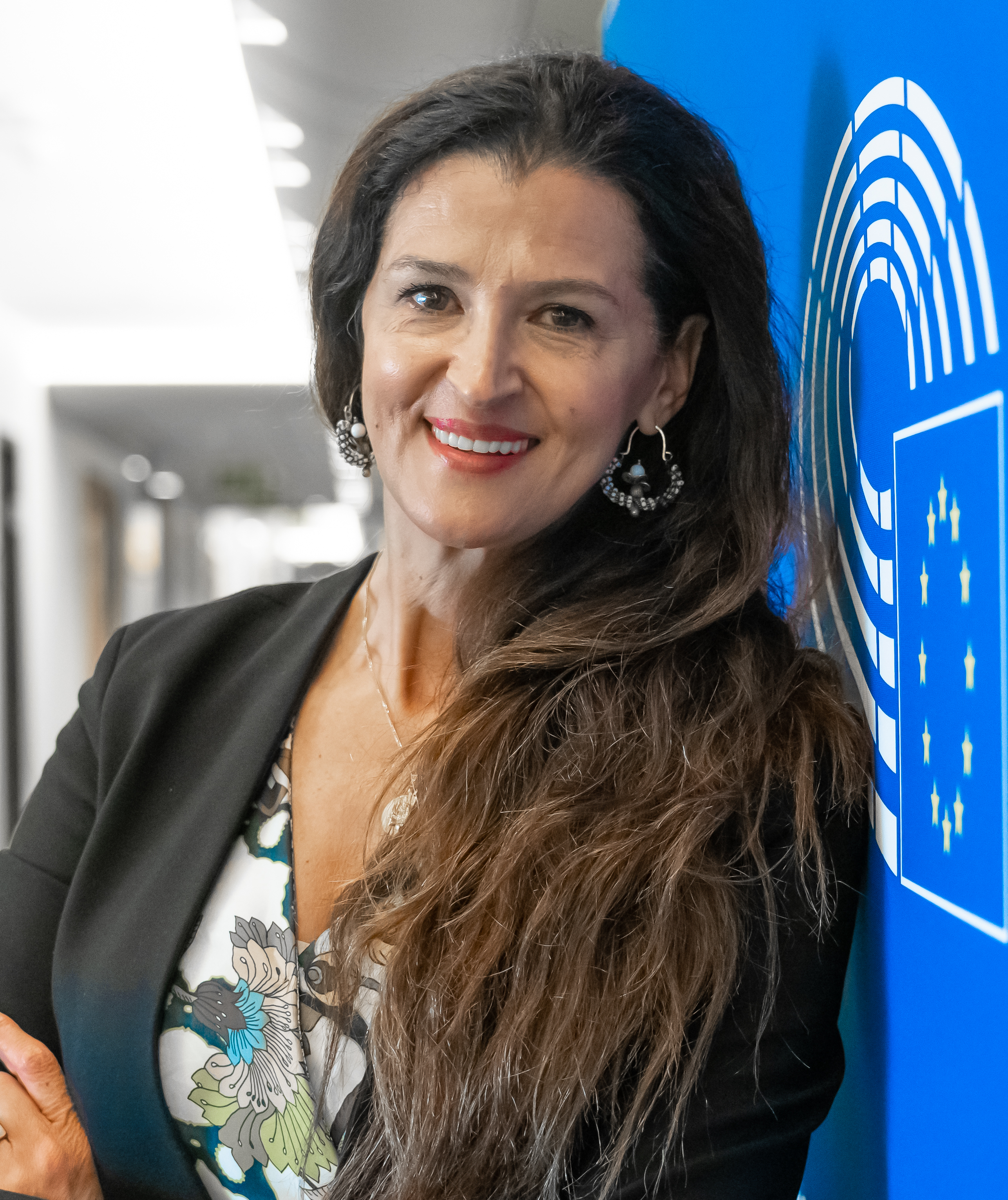

Member of the European Parliament for Croatia
- Incumbent
- Assumed office 1 February 2020

Personal details
- Born: 28 November 1964 (age 61) Split, SR Croatia, SFR Yugoslavia (modern Croatia)
- Party: SDP (1999–2026)
- Education: University of Rijeka

Romana Jerković (born 28 November 1964) is a Croatian politician of the Social Democratic Party currently serving her second term as a Member of the European Parliament for Croatia since February 2020, when Croatia gained one more EP seat due to Brexit. She was re-elected at the 2024 European Parliament election.

Before becoming an MEP she was a member of the Croatian Parliament from 2008 to 2020 and deputy mayor of Rijeka from 2006 to 2009.

== Early life and education ==
Jerković was born in Split and grew up in the Lovište village on Pelješac. She graduated at the School of Medicine, University of Rijeka in 1994. In 1998, she received her doctorate at the Department of Biomedical Research of the University of Padua in Italy. She came back to Rijeka and started working at the Institute of Anatomy of the School of Medicine.

== Political career ==
=== Career in national politics ===
Jerković joined the Social Democratic Party in 1999. She became a member of the Croatian Parliament in 2008 as a substitute for Zlatko Komadina.

=== Member of the European Parliament, 2020–present ===
Jerković stood for her party at the 2019 European Parliament election in Croatia failing to win a seat immediately but securing a seat among the British seats that were redistributed after the UK left the European Union. She took her seat in the European Parliament after Brexit.

In parliament, Jerković has since been serving on the Committee on Industry, Research and Energy. She has been the parliament's rapporteur on the European Commission's 2021 proposal for a regulation on electronic identification and trust services for electronic transactions (eIDAS).

In addition to her committee assignments, Jerković is part of the parliament's delegation to the EU-Albania Stabilisation and Association Parliamentary Committee and the European Parliament Intergroup on Cancer.

=== 2024 Strasbourg study visit ===
In October 2026, POLITICO reported on a three-day study visit to Strasbourg organised by Jerković in December 2024 and funded by the Progressive Alliance of Socialists and Democrats (S&D) group in the European Parliament. More than ten people from Croatia took part, including members of Jerković's family, friends and associates. According to a person familiar with the organisation of the visit who spoke to POLITICO, the total cost to the S&D group may have exceeded €12,000.

POLITICO reported that documentation relating to the visit described several participants as holding positions at medical or academic institutions in Rijeka that did not correspond to their actual employment. Jerković's sister, Renata Jerković, was listed as an assistant at the University of Rijeka's Faculty of Medicine, although POLITICO said it could not find her among the faculty's publicly listed teaching staff. Jerković's office subsequently acknowledged that incorrect functions had been entered for some participants, describing this as an administrative error.

According to documents reviewed by POLITICO, invoices of €1,120 each were submitted to the S&D group for two "working dinners" held at Strasbourg restaurants. The group had also requested a photograph of the participants with an S&D banner identifying the subject of the event as "Challenges and priorities in the Health Union" as part of the documentation required for reimbursement. S&D did not tell POLITICO whether the two dinner invoices were ultimately reimbursed.

Jerković denied wrongdoing and told POLITICO that "every cent is accounted for". She later said that she had personally paid the expenses of her family members, including her sister's travel, accommodation and meals. Her office stated that the actual cost of the event was €8,218.45, or €747.13 per participant, rather than the figure reported in the media, and said that the incorrect descriptions of some participants had resulted from an administrative error. It also said that meetings on European health policy had taken place during the visit and that rooms at the European Parliament had been used for them.

The S&D group said that, after reviewing the documentation, the applicable financial rules had been respected. Following the reports, SDP president Siniša Hajdaš Dončić publicly asked Jerković to provide further explanations, in particular about how the participants had been described in the documentation.
