= Biljana Borzan =

Croatian physician and politician

Biljana Borzan MEP
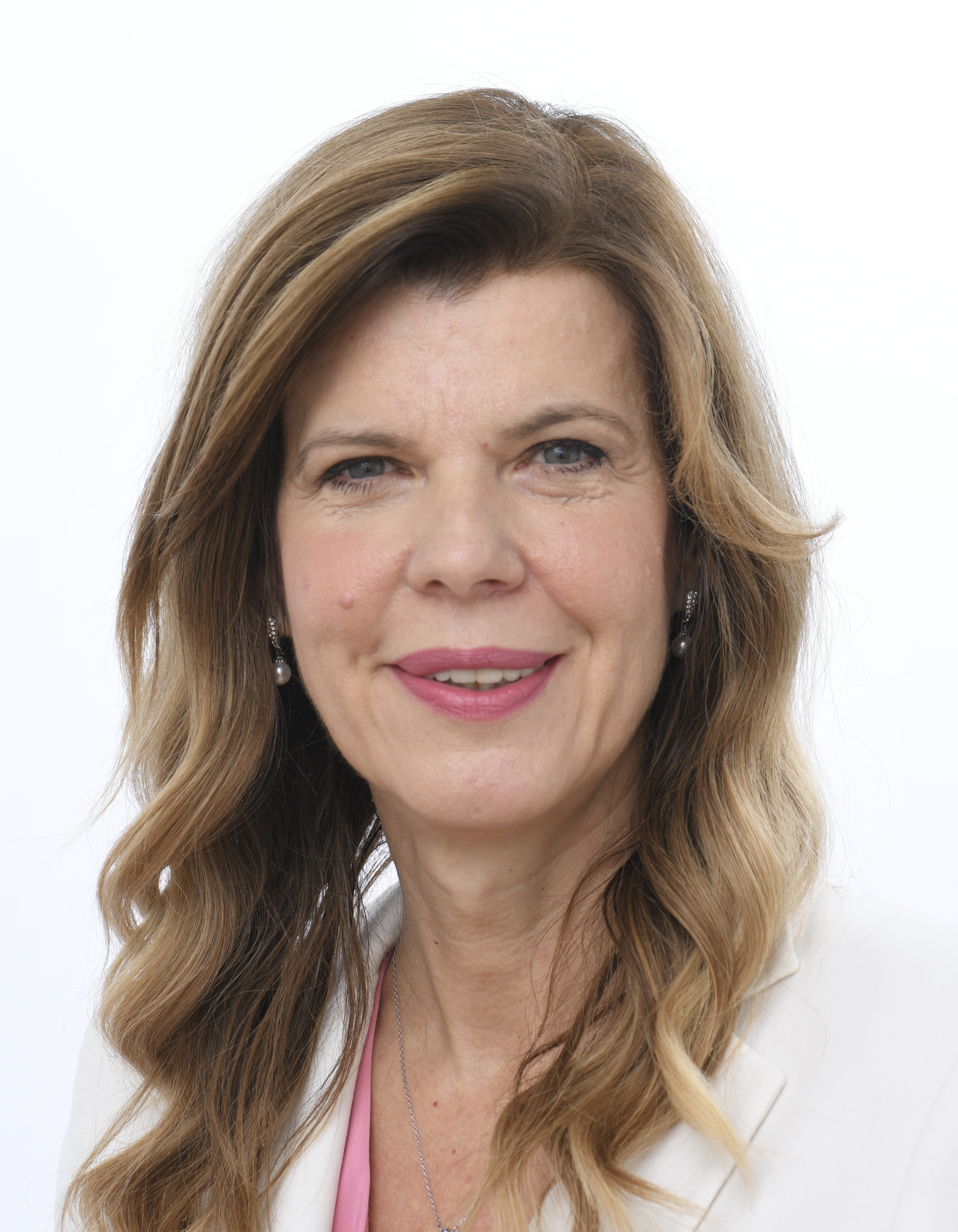

Member of the European Parliament for Croatia
- Incumbent
- Assumed office 1 July 2013

Vice President of the Socialists & Democrats Parliamentary Group
- In office 19 June 2019 – 26 June 2024
- President: Iratxe García

Personal details
- Born: Biljana Čupurdija; 29 November 1971 (age 54) Osijek, SR Croatia, SFR Yugoslavia (modern Croatia)
- Citizenship: Croatian
- Party: Croatian; Social Democratic Party; EU; Progressive Alliance of Socialists and Democrats
- Spouse: Vladimir Borzan
- Children: 2
- Education: University of Zagreb
- Occupation: Politician
- Profession: Physician

Biljana Borzan (née Čupurdija; born 29 November 1971) is a Croatian physician and politician who has been member of the European Parliament for Croatia since 1 July 2013, having been elected to the position at the 2013, 2014 and 2019 elections. She is a member of the center-left Social Democratic Party of Croatia (SDP) and serving as the Vice President of the Socialists & Democrats in the Ninth European Parliament.

== Early life and career ==
Biljana Borzan was born in Osijek on November 29, 1971. After finishing elementary and high school in her hometown, she enrolled at the Osijek branch of the Zagreb School of Medicine. Borzan specialized occupational and sport medicine. In 1997, she got employed at the Osijek Health Center where she worked until 2007.

== Political career ==
=== Career in national politics ===
Borzan got involved in politics in 1999 by joining Social Democratic Party of Croatia (SDP), because she "couldn't be a passive observer" since she was "dissatisfied with the level of democracy, tolerance, and justice in the country following the rule of President Franjo Tuđman". In 2000, she became a member of the Council of the SDP Osijek, and in 2001, president of the Osijek branch of the SDP's Woman's Forum. At the 2001 local elections, Borzan was elected to the Osijek City Council. Between September 2004 and May 2005, she was Council President. In 2004, she became Vice President of the SDP's Main Board. Borzan was elected president of the SDP's Osijek branch in 2005. At the 2005 local elections, she was re-elected to the Osijek City Council.

At the 2007 parliamentary election, she was elected to the Croatian Parliament, representing 4th electoral district. During this term, she was a member of the Petitions and Appeals Committee, and Committee on Information, Computerisation and the Media. She was a member of the SDP's Presidency since 2008. Between May 2008 to January 2009, Borzan served as a Deputy Mayor of Osijek. She was re-elected to the Osijek City Council at the 2009 local elections, and to the Croatian Parliament at the 2011 parliamentary election. During her second MP term, she served as president of the Committee on Health and Social Policy, member of the Foreign Policy Committee, and Croatian Observer to the European Parliament (16 March 2012 to 1 July 2013).

=== Member of the European Parliament, 2013–present ===
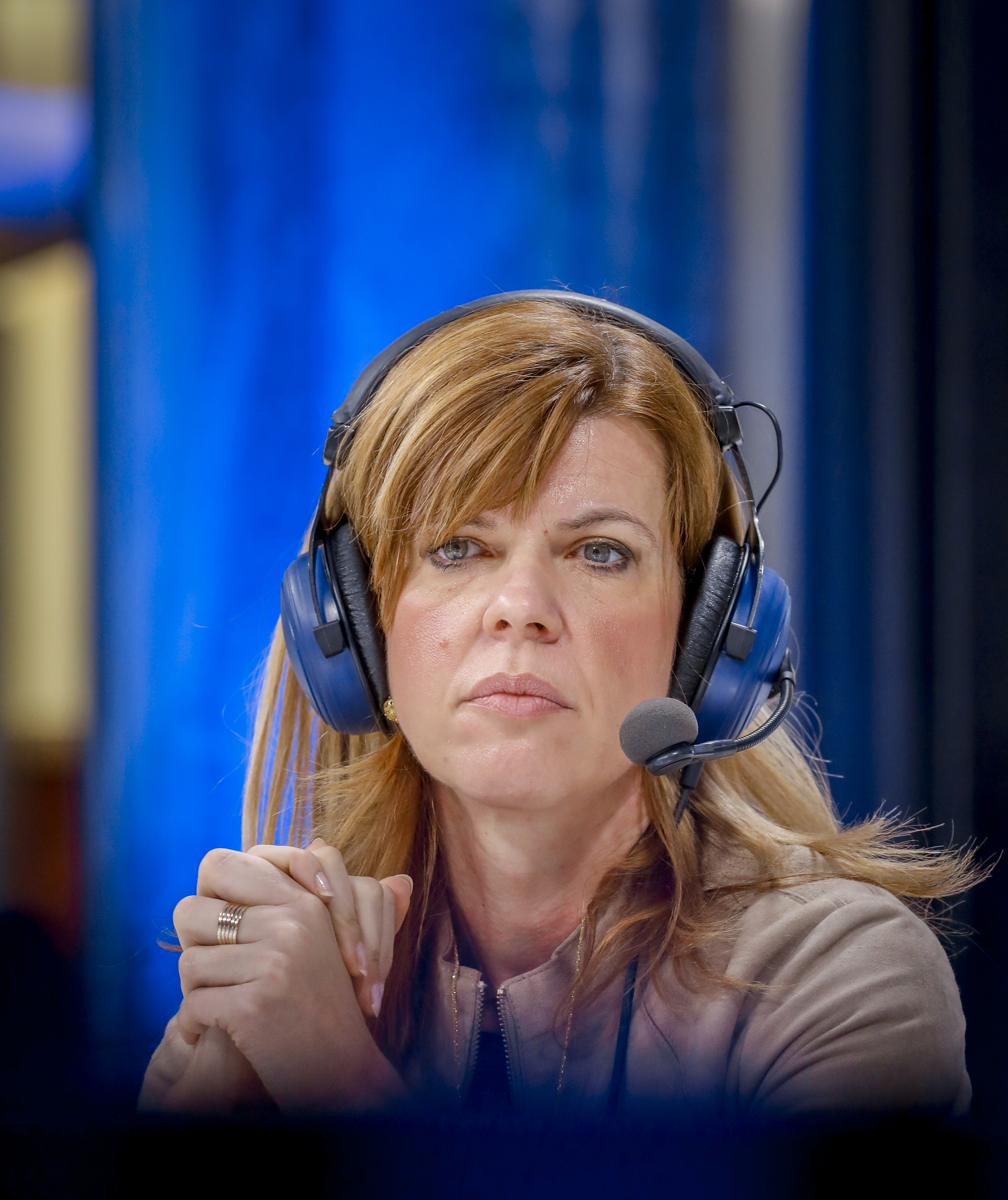
Borzan at a debate in the European Parliament in 2017

At the 2013 European Parliament election, Borzan was elected as one of 12 Croatian MEP's and was re-elected in 2014 election and 2019 election. From 2013 until 2019, she was a full member of the Committee on the Environment, Public Health and Food Safety, where she worked on issues concerning health, environment, food production control and food trade. She was a substitute member in Committee on Internal Market and Consumer Protection where she dealt with dual quality of products on the internal market, sustainable consumption, parcel delivery and consumers’ rights on the digital single market. She also served as a substitute member on the Committee on Women’s Rights and Gender Equality and the Parliament’s rapporteur on Women’s Rights in the Western Balkans.

As the representative of the S&D Group, Borzan was part of the Parliament's team that, in 2016, successfully concluded the negotiations on the Regulations on Medical Devices and In vitro diagnostic devices with the European Council. Borzan was the European Parliament's rapporteur on a report on reducing food waste and improving food safety which was adopted in May 2017. She is the main author of the Regulations in the European Parliament's Committee on Internal Market and Consumer Protection, which makes cross-border delivery more cost-effective for the EU citizens, and make it easier for small and medium-sized businesses to enter the wider market. On 25 September 2017, Europe's leading baby food brand Hipp Holding announced that it would relaunch one of its products after jars sold in Eastern Europe were found to contain a lower proportion of vegetables and an omega-3 source compared with the identically branded product sold in the Western Europe, following the publication of the results of the research initiated by Borzan herself, and supervised by the Croatian Food Agency. Borzan announced that she expects from other manufacturers to follow Hipp's example. She later pushed for EU legislation on the issue and the banning of dual quality of products in the Unfair Commercial Practices Directive.

In October 2016. Borzan was delegated as the European Parliament's contact person for relations with the European Medicines Agency (EMA). In 2018, she played an important role in the legislative process related to the relocation of the Agency from London to Amsterdam.

Following the 2019 elections, Borzan was elected vice chair of the S&D Group, under the leadership of chairwoman Iratxe García. Her portfolio includes Internal Market and Consumer Protection Committee, Economic and Monetary Affairs Committee and Committee on International Trade. She joined the Committee on the Internal Market and Consumer Protection as full member and Committee on the Environment, Public Health and Food Safety as substitute. In addition to her committee assignments, she is part of the European Parliament Intergroup on LGBT Rights, the European Parliament Intergroup on Disability, the European Parliament Intergroup on the Welfare and Conservation of Animals and the MEPs Against Cancer group.

== Recognition ==
In 2018, The Parliament Magazine presented Borzan with "The Women’s Rights and Gender Equality Award".

== Personal life ==
Borzan was born as Biljana Čupurdija (Serbian Cyrillic: Биљана Чупурдија) in a Croatian Serb family. Her father Jovo was an active member of the League of Communists of Croatia, and her mother Rosa worked in the State Security Service. Borzan is married to Vladimir Borzan with whom she has two sons, Andrej and Matej. Her husband works as gastroenterologist at the Clinical Hospital Center in Osijek. The family lives in Osijek. In her free time, she loves to paint, sing, read, and sew the clothes she wears. Apart from her mother tongue, Borzan speaks English, German and Russian.
