= Committees of the European Parliament =

European Union legislative working groups

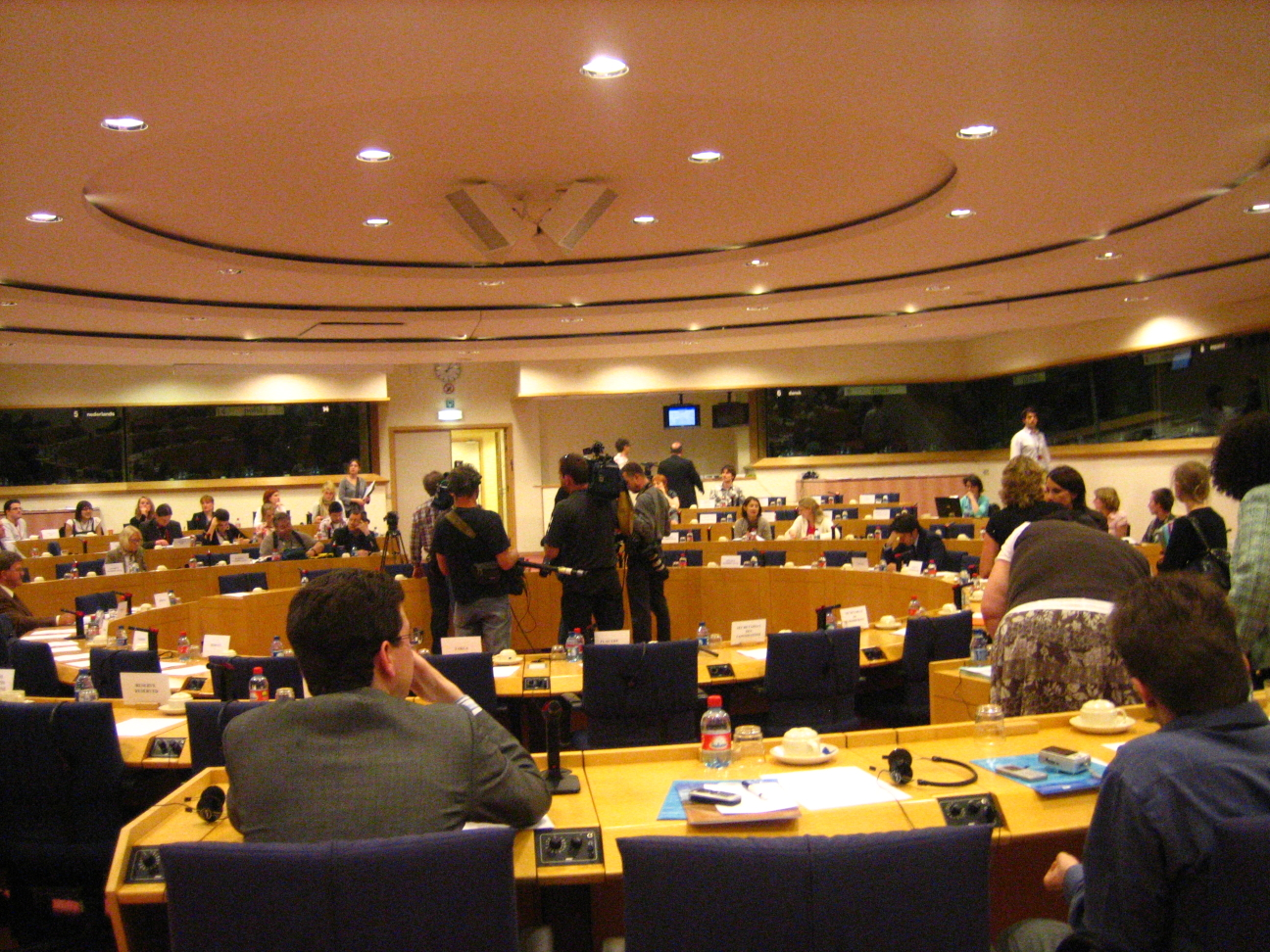
A committee room in the Parliament

The committees of the European Parliament are designed to examine proposals in detail before the matter is dealt with by the full Parliament. They comprise Standing Committees and occasional Temporary Committees or Committees on Inquiry.

Each committee is composed to reflect the overall political balance of the Parliament as a whole, with seats allocated to each of the political Groups in proportion to their size. Each committee also has substitute members who may vote in place of an absent full member from their political Group.

Standing Committees generally produce reports for consideration by Parliament in its debates. These can be on legislative proposals from the European Commission, or "own initiative reports" on a matter which the committee wishes to take up. Reports are usually drafted by a rapporteur, who is appointed by the committee, selected from amongst its members. The rapporteur's draft is voted on by the committee, typically with amendments being tabled and voted on. The report as adopted by the committee is then presented to the full Parliament for debate and vote.

== Chairs and Vice Chairs ==
Each committee elects its own Chair and Vice Chairs. Traditionally, political groups in the Parliament have reached an agreement to share such posts among them (while excluding extremist parties) in proportion to their size (calculated according to the D'Hondt method). Committee members have usually, but not always, followed the recommendations of the political Groups.

== Legislative reports ==
Before drafting legislative proposals, the European Commission will consult the various standing committees before formally submitting its proposal to the Parliament and the Council to initiate the European Union legislative procedure.

At the start of the legislative procedure, Parliament designates one committee as the responsible committee, though other committees may submit their own opinions to it. Occasionally, when the subject matter cuts across the responisibilties of more than one committee, joint committee meetings can be provided for or, exceptionally, an ad hoc committee to deal with a specific legislative proposal.

Reports on legislative proposals normally comprise draft amendments to the legislative proposal and a draft resolution containing a recommendation to accept or reject the proposal. These are voted on by Parliament, along with any amendments tabled by political groups or one-twentieth of the individual members.

The same committee(s) will be responsible in any second or third reading of the proposal, and will also provide the members who represent Parliament in any inter-institutional negotiations with the Council seeking to reconcile the position of the two institutions which jointly constitute the EU legislature.

== Non-legislative reports and Own-Initiative Reports ==
Committees are also able to produce non-legislative reports relevant to their competence. The appointed rapporteur is responsible for preparing the report, and presenting it to Parliament on the committee's behalf. These reports must include a motion for a resolution, an explanatory statement, and must also outline financial implications. These can be own-initiative reports requesting the Commission to draft legislative proposals for consideration by the Parliament and the Council. Before drawing up any such report, a committee must obtain the permission of the Conference of Presidents. The Conference of Presidents has two months to make a decision, and any reasons for withholding permission must always be stated.

== Cross-committee co-operation ==
When drawing up a report, a committee may ask the opinion of another committee on the matter, particularly if it is felt that a proposed amendment would fall into the interests of another committee. The committee asked for an opinion will be named as such in the final report. The chair and drafter of the secondary committee may be invited to take part in any committee discussions held by the primary committee, where the meeting deals with the matter that the secondary committee is advising on.

Amendments that are proposed by the secondary committee will be voted on by the committee responsible for producing the report.

If the Conference of Presidents decides that a requested report falls equally to two committees, both committees will agree upon a joint timetable, and shall work together in producing the report.

== List of standing committees ==
This is a list of standing committees along with the respective chairperson as of February 2026.

Committee		Members	Chair			Vice Chairs		
Committee		Members	1st half of term (2024-2027)		2nd half of term (2027-2029)	1st half of term (2024-2027)		2nd half of term (2027-2029)
Committee on Foreign Affairs	AFET	79	EPP	David McAllister	GER	S&D	Hana Jalloul	ESP
Committee on Foreign Affairs	AFET	79	EPP	David McAllister	GER	RE	Urmas Paet	EST
Committee on Foreign Affairs	AFET	79	EPP	David McAllister	GER	ECR	Alberico Gambino	ITA
Committee on Foreign Affairs	AFET	79	EPP	David McAllister	GER	EPP	Ioan-Rareș Bogdan	ROM
Subcommittee on Security and Defence	SEDE	30	RE	Marie-Agnes Strack-Zimmermann	GER	EPP	Christophe Gomart	FRA
Subcommittee on Security and Defence	SEDE	30	RE	Marie-Agnes Strack-Zimmermann	GER	S&D	Mihai Tudose	ROM
Subcommittee on Security and Defence	SEDE	30	RE	Marie-Agnes Strack-Zimmermann	GER	ECR	Alberico Gambino	ITA
Subcommittee on Security and Defence	SEDE	30	RE	Marie-Agnes Strack-Zimmermann	GER	EPP	Riho Terras	EST
Subcommittee on Human Rights	DROI	30	G/EFA	Mounir Satouri	FRA	S&D	Marta Temido	POR
Subcommittee on Human Rights	DROI	30	G/EFA	Mounir Satouri	FRA	EPP	Łukasz Kohut	POL
Subcommittee on Human Rights	DROI	30	G/EFA	Mounir Satouri	FRA	Vacant		
Subcommittee on Human Rights	DROI	30	G/EFA	Mounir Satouri	FRA	Vacant		
Committee on Development	DEVE	25	RE	Barry Andrews	IRE	G/EFA	Isabella Lövin	SWE
Committee on Development	DEVE	25	RE	Barry Andrews	IRE	EPP	Hildegard Bentele	GER
Committee on Development	DEVE	25	RE	Barry Andrews	IRE	RE	Abir Al-Sahlani	SWE
Committee on Development	DEVE	25	RE	Barry Andrews	IRE	S&D	Robert Biedroń	POL
Committee on International Trade	INTA	43	S&D	Bernd Lange	GER	LEFT	Manon Aubry	FRA
Committee on International Trade	INTA	43	S&D	Bernd Lange	GER	EPP	Iuliu Winkler	ROM
Committee on International Trade	INTA	43	S&D	Bernd Lange	GER	RE	Karin Karlsbro	SWE
Committee on International Trade	INTA	43	S&D	Bernd Lange	GER	S&D	Kathleen Van Brempt	BEL
Committee on Budgets	BUDG	40	ECR	Johan Van Overtveldt	BEL	EPP	Monika Hohlmeier	GER
Committee on Budgets	BUDG	40	ECR	Johan Van Overtveldt	BEL	S&D	Giuseppe Lupo	ITA
Committee on Budgets	BUDG	40	ECR	Johan Van Overtveldt	BEL	EPP	Janusz Lewandowski	POL
Committee on Budgets	BUDG	40	ECR	Johan Van Overtveldt	BEL	RE	Lucia Yar	SVK
Committee on Budgetary Control	CONT	30	EPP	Niclas Herbst	GER	EPP	Caterina Chinnici	ITA
Committee on Budgetary Control	CONT	30	EPP	Niclas Herbst	GER	ECR	Cristian Terheș	ROM
Committee on Budgetary Control	CONT	30	EPP	Niclas Herbst	GER	S&D	Claudiu Manda	ROM
Committee on Budgetary Control	CONT	30	EPP	Niclas Herbst	GER	Vacant		
Committee on Economic and Monetary Affairs	ECON	60	S&D	Aurore Lalucq	FRA	G/EFA	Damian Boeselager	NED
Committee on Economic and Monetary Affairs	ECON	60	S&D	Aurore Lalucq	FRA	RE	Ľudovít Ódor	SVK
Committee on Economic and Monetary Affairs	ECON	60	S&D	Aurore Lalucq	FRA	EPP	Luděk Niedermayer	CZE
Committee on Economic and Monetary Affairs	ECON	60	S&D	Aurore Lalucq	FRA	ECR	Marlena Maląg	POL
Subcommittee on Tax Matters	FISC	30	LEFT	Pasquale Tridico	ITA	G/EFA	Kira Marie Peter-Hansen	DEN
Subcommittee on Tax Matters	FISC	30	LEFT	Pasquale Tridico	ITA	EPP	Regina Doherty	IRE
Subcommittee on Tax Matters	FISC	30	LEFT	Pasquale Tridico	ITA	EPP	Markus Ferber	GER
Subcommittee on Tax Matters	FISC	30	LEFT	Pasquale Tridico	ITA	S&D	Matthias Ecke	GER
Committee on Employment and Social Affairs	EMPL	60	LEFT	Li Andersson	FIN	S&D	Johan Danielsson	SWE
Committee on Employment and Social Affairs	EMPL	60	LEFT	Li Andersson	FIN	EPP	Jagna Marczułajtis-Walczak	POL
Committee on Employment and Social Affairs	EMPL	60	LEFT	Li Andersson	FIN	G/EFA	Katrin Langensiepen	GER
Committee on Employment and Social Affairs	EMPL	60	LEFT	Li Andersson	FIN	Vacant		
Committee on Environment, Public Health and Food Safety	ENVI	90	S&D	Pierfrancesco Maran	ITA	EPP	Esther Herranz García	ESP
Committee on Environment, Public Health and Food Safety	ENVI	90	S&D	Pierfrancesco Maran	ITA	ECR	Pietro Fiocchi	ITA
Committee on Environment, Public Health and Food Safety	ENVI	90	S&D	Pierfrancesco Maran	ITA	LEFT	Anja Hazekamp	NED
Committee on Environment, Public Health and Food Safety	ENVI	90	S&D	Pierfrancesco Maran	ITA	EPP	András Tivadar Kulja	HUN
Subcommittee on Public Health	SANT	30	EPP	Adam Jarubas	POL	G/EFA	Tilly Metz	LUX
Subcommittee on Public Health	SANT	30	EPP	Adam Jarubas	POL	RE	Stine Bosse	DEN
Subcommittee on Public Health	SANT	30	EPP	Adam Jarubas	POL	S&D	Romana Jerković	CRO
Subcommittee on Public Health	SANT	30	EPP	Adam Jarubas	POL	ECR	Emmanouil Fragkos	GRE
Committee on Industry, Research and Energy	ITRE	90	EPP	Borys Budka	POL	S&D	Tsvetelina Penkova	BUL
Committee on Industry, Research and Energy	ITRE	90	EPP	Borys Budka	POL	ECR	Elena Donazzan	ITA
Committee on Industry, Research and Energy	ITRE	90	EPP	Borys Budka	POL	S&D	Giorgio Gori	ITA
Committee on Industry, Research and Energy	ITRE	90	EPP	Borys Budka	POL	RE	Yvan Verougstraete	BEL
Committee on Internal Market and Consumer Protection	IMCO	52	G/EFA	Anna Cavazzini	GER	EPP	Christian Doleschal	GER
Committee on Internal Market and Consumer Protection	IMCO	52	G/EFA	Anna Cavazzini	GER	RE	Nikola Minchev	BUL
Committee on Internal Market and Consumer Protection	IMCO	52	G/EFA	Anna Cavazzini	GER	S&D	Maria Grapini	ROM
Committee on Internal Market and Consumer Protection	IMCO	52	G/EFA	Anna Cavazzini	GER	EPP	Kamila Gasiuk-Pihowicz	POL
Committee on Transport and Tourism	TRAN	46	EPP	Elissavet Vozemberg-Vrionidi	GRE	G/EFA	Virginijus Sinkevičius	LIT
Committee on Transport and Tourism	TRAN	46	EPP	Elissavet Vozemberg-Vrionidi	GRE	EPP	Sophia Kircher	AUT
Committee on Transport and Tourism	TRAN	46	EPP	Elissavet Vozemberg-Vrionidi	GRE	LEFT	Elena Kountoura	GRE
Committee on Transport and Tourism	TRAN	46	EPP	Elissavet Vozemberg-Vrionidi	GRE	S&D	Matteo Ricci	ITA
Committee on Regional Development	REGI	41	S&D	Dragoș Benea	ROM	EPP	Gabriella Gerzsenyi	HUN
Committee on Regional Development	REGI	41	S&D	Dragoș Benea	ROM	S&D	Nora Mebarek	FRA
Committee on Regional Development	REGI	41	S&D	Dragoș Benea	ROM	ECR	Francesco Ventola	ITA
Committee on Regional Development	REGI	41	S&D	Dragoș Benea	ROM	RE	Ľubica Karvašová	SVK
Committee on Agriculture and Rural Development	AGRI	49	ECR	Veronika Vrecionová	CZE	EPP	Daniel Buda	ROM
Committee on Agriculture and Rural Development	AGRI	49	ECR	Veronika Vrecionová	CZE	EPP	Norbert Lins	GER
Committee on Agriculture and Rural Development	AGRI	49	ECR	Veronika Vrecionová	CZE	S&D	Eric Sargiacomo	FRA
Committee on Agriculture and Rural Development	AGRI	49	ECR	Veronika Vrecionová	CZE	Vacant		
Committee on Fisheries	PECH	27	EPP	Carmen Crespo Díaz	ESP	EPP	Sander Smit	NED
Committee on Fisheries	PECH	27	EPP	Carmen Crespo Díaz	ESP	ECR	Giuseppe Milazzo	ITA
Committee on Fisheries	PECH	27	EPP	Carmen Crespo Díaz	ESP	RE	Stéphanie Yon-Courtin	FRA
Committee on Fisheries	PECH	27	EPP	Carmen Crespo Díaz	ESP	EPP	Jessica Polfjärd	SWE
Committee on Culture and Education	CULT	30	G/EFA	Nela Riehl	GER	EPP	Bogdan Andrzej Zdrojewski	POL
Committee on Culture and Education	CULT	30	G/EFA	Nela Riehl	GER	S&D	Emma Rafowicz	FRA
Committee on Culture and Education	CULT	30	G/EFA	Nela Riehl	GER	G/EFA	Diana Riba	ESP
Committee on Culture and Education	CULT	30	G/EFA	Nela Riehl	GER	RE	Hristo Petrov	BUL
Committee on Legal Affairs	JURI	25	RE	Ilhan Kyuchyuk	BUL	EPP	Marion Walsmann	GER
Committee on Legal Affairs	JURI	25	RE	Ilhan Kyuchyuk	BUL	ECR	Mario Mantovani	ITA
Committee on Legal Affairs	JURI	25	RE	Ilhan Kyuchyuk	BUL	S&D	Lara Wolters	NED
Committee on Legal Affairs	JURI	25	RE	Ilhan Kyuchyuk	BUL	EPP	Emil Radev	BUL
Committee on Civil Liberties, Justice and Home Affairs	LIBE	75	EPP	Javier Zarzalejos	ESP	S&D	Marina Kaljurand	EST
Committee on Civil Liberties, Justice and Home Affairs	LIBE	75	EPP	Javier Zarzalejos	ESP	ECR	Charlie Weimers	SWE
Committee on Civil Liberties, Justice and Home Affairs	LIBE	75	EPP	Javier Zarzalejos	ESP	S&D	Alessandro Zan	ITA
Committee on Civil Liberties, Justice and Home Affairs	LIBE	75	EPP	Javier Zarzalejos	ESP	LEFT	Estrella Galán	ESP
Committee on Constitutional Affairs	AFCO	30	EPP	Sven Simon	GER	S&D	Gabriele Bischoff	GER
Committee on Constitutional Affairs	AFCO	30	EPP	Sven Simon	GER	EPP	Adrián Vázquez Lázara	ESP
Committee on Constitutional Affairs	AFCO	30	EPP	Sven Simon	GER	RE	Charles Goerens	LUX
Committee on Constitutional Affairs	AFCO	30	EPP	Sven Simon	GER	EPP	Péter Magyar	HUN
Committee on Women's Rights and Gender Equality	FEMM	40	S&D	Lina Gálvez	ESP	RE	Dainius Žalimas	LIT
Committee on Women's Rights and Gender Equality	FEMM	40	S&D	Lina Gálvez	ESP	LEFT	Irene Montero	ESP
Committee on Women's Rights and Gender Equality	FEMM	40	S&D	Lina Gálvez	ESP	EPP	Rosa Estaràs Ferragut	ESP
Committee on Women's Rights and Gender Equality	FEMM	40	S&D	Lina Gálvez	ESP	S&D	Predrag Fred Matić	CRO
Committee on Petitions	PETI	35	ECR	Bogdan Rzońca	POL	EPP	Dolors Montserrat	ESP
Committee on Petitions	PETI	35	ECR	Bogdan Rzońca	POL	EPP	Fredis Beleris	GRE
Committee on Petitions	PETI	35	ECR	Bogdan Rzońca	POL	S&D	Nils Ušakovs	LAT
Committee on Petitions	PETI	35	ECR	Bogdan Rzońca	POL	G/EFA	Cristina Guarda	ITA

== Special committees ==
Under Rule 213 of its rules of procedure, the Parliament may at any time set up special committees for specific reports for an initial period of no longer than 12 months. Examples of such special committees have been:

- The Temporary Committee on the ECHELON Interception System (2000–01)
- The Temporary Committee on the alleged use of European countries by the CIA for the transport and illegal detention of prisoners (2006–07)
- Special Committee on the Financial, Economic and Social Crisis (2009-11)
- Special committee on the EU authorisation procedure for pesticides (2018)
- Special committee on foreign interference in the democratic processes of the European Union (2020–23)
- Special committee on the Housing Crisis in the European Union (2025-26)

=== Committees of Inquiry ===
The European Parliament was granted the right to create temporary committees of inquiry under Article 226 of the 1993 Maastricht Treaty. This in fact recognised an existing practice, as the Parliament had created nine committees of inquiry in the period between the introduction of direct elections in 1979 and the inclusion of this legal basis in the treaty. They were:

Year	Committee
1983	The Seveso disaster
1984	The rise of fascism and racism. The committee's work led to the 'Joint Declaration against racism and xenophobia'.
1985	The drugs problem
1986	Agricultural stocks
1988	The Transnuklear scandal
1988	Hormones in meat
1991	Racism and Xenophobia (The application of the Joint Declaration against racism and xenophobia)
1991	Trans-frontier crime linked to drug trafficking.

Since then, under Article 226 of the 1993 Maastricht Treaty, the Inquiry Committees since 1995 have been:

EP	Year	Abbrev	Committee of inquiry	Chairperson	Rapporteur
Fourth	1996-1997	TRANSIT	Temporary Committee of Inquiry into the Community Transit System	John Tomlinson	Edward Kellett-Bowman
Fourth	1996-1997	ESB I	Temporary Committee of Inquiry into BSE (Bovine spongiform encephalopathy)	Reimer Böge	Manuel Medina Ortega
Sixth	2006-2007	EQUI	Temporary Committee of Inquiry into the Crisis of the Equitable Life Assurance Society	Mairead McGuinness	Diana Wallis
Eighth	2015	EMIS	on the measurement of emissions in the automotive sector, established on 17 December 2015, whose work was finalised on 4 April 2017. See Dieselgate.	Kathleen Van Brempt	Pablo Zalba Bidegain, Gerben-Jan Gerbrandy
Eighth	2016	PANA	on money laundering, tax avoidance and tax fraud, established on 8 June 2016, whose work was finalised on 13 December 2017. See Panama Papers.	Werner Langen	Jeppe Kofod, Petr Ježek
Ninth	2020	ANIT	on the Protection of animals during transport, established on 19 June 2020.	Tilly Metz	Daniel Buda, Isabel Carvalhais
Ninth	2022	PEGA	On the use of Pegasus and equivalent surveillance spyware, established on 10 March 2022. See Pegasus Project (investigation).	Jeroen Lenaers	Sophie in 't Veld

== Delegations ==
MEPs also compose delegations to various Parliaments outside of the European Union. Joint parliamentary committees are set up with candidate countries. There are also delegations to the ACP–EU Joint Parliamentary Assembly, the Euro-Latin American Parliamentary Assembly the Euronest Parliamentary Assembly and the Euro-Mediterranean Parliamentary Assembly and the EU-UK Parliamentary Partnership Assembly.

- North Macedonia
- Turkey
- Mexico
- Chile
- Switzerland, Iceland and Norway and European Economic Area
- Russia
- South-East Europe
- Ukraine
- Moldova
- Kazakhstan, Kyrgyzstan, Uzbekistan, Tajikistan, Turkmenistan and Mongolia
- Armenia, Azerbaijan and Georgia
- Belarus
- Israel
- Palestine
- Maghreb
- Mashreq
- Arabian Peninsula
- Iran
- United States
- Canada
- Central America
- Andean Community
- Mercosur
- Japan
- People's Republic of China
- Southeast Asia, ASEAN
- Korean peninsula
- Australia and New Zealand
- South Africa
- NATO
- South Asia
- India
- Afghanistan
- Pan-African Parliament
- Caribbean Forum

== Conference of Committee Chairs and Conference of Delegation Chairs ==
Two bodies in the Parliament are the Conference of Committee Chairs (CCC) and the Conference of Delegation Chairs (CDC). The Conference of Committee Chairs is the political body in Parliament that organises cooperation between the committees and consists of the chairs of all the standing and special committees. The Conference of Delegation Chairs is the political body in Parliament that periodically considers all matters concerning the smooth running of interparliamentary delegations and delegations to the joint parliamentary committees. They may make recommendations to the Conference of Presidents and can be instructed to carry out particular tasks by the Bureau or Conference of Presidents.
