= Tenth European Parliament =

Incumbent session of the European Parliament from 2024 to 2029

10th European Parliament
- 16 July 2024 – 2029
- President (1st Half): (Malta) Roberta Metsola (EPP)
- Vice-Presidents: First Vice-President: 1st Half: (Germany) Sabine Verheyen (EPP)
- Commission: Von der Leyen I; Von der Leyen II
- Political groups: EPP Group (184); S&D (135); PfE (85); ECR Group (84); Renew (78); Greens/EFA (53); The Left (45); ESN (27); NI (28); Vacant (1)
- MEPs: 720
- Elections: June 2024 (Union)
- Treaty on European Union; Treaty on the Functioning of the European Union (Note: The Treaty of Rome and the Treaty of Maastricht as amended by the Treaty of Lisbon and all preceding amending treaties.)
- Website: Official website

The tenth European Parliament was elected during the 2024 elections and is slated to remain in session until the forthcoming 2029 elections.

== Major events ==
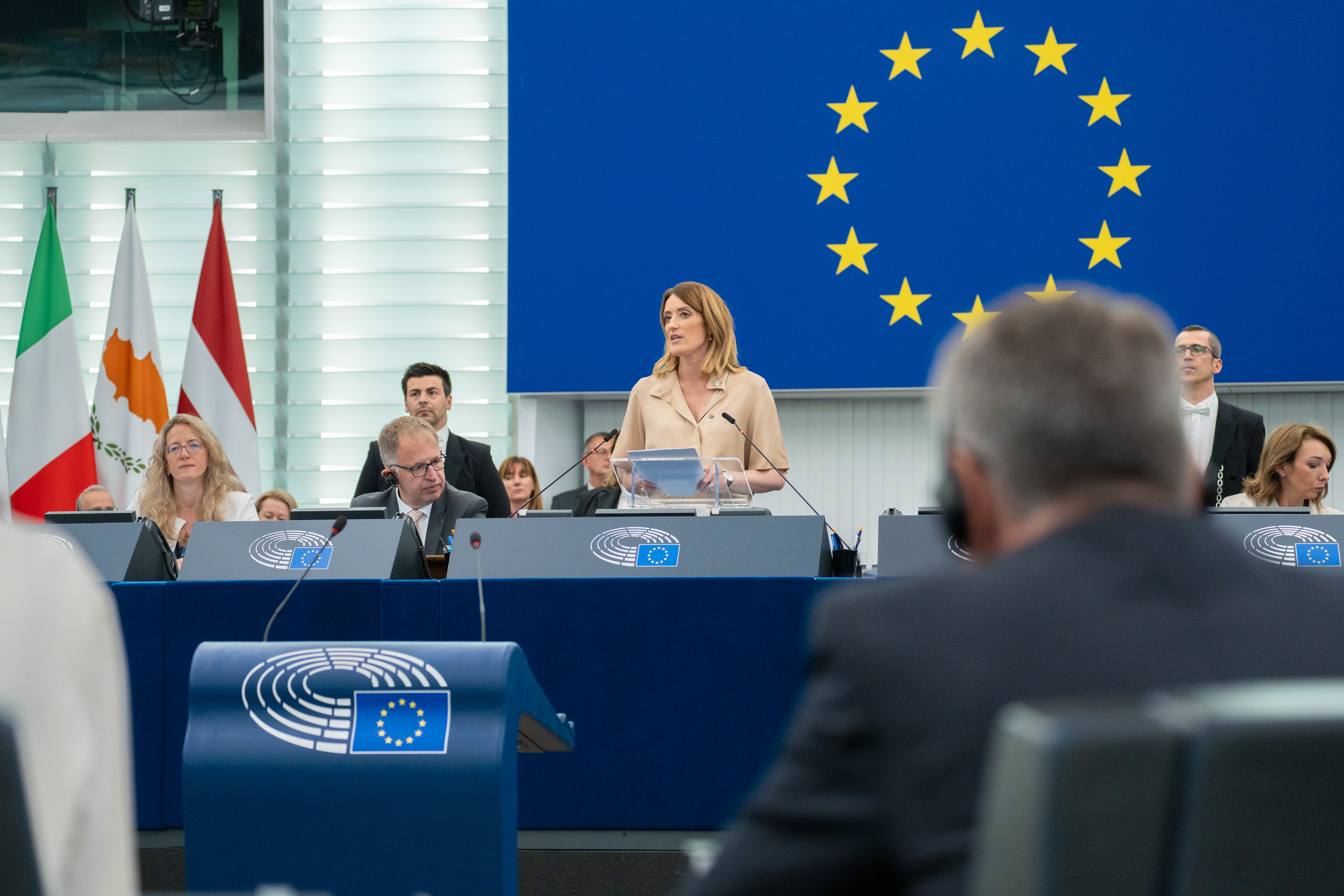
Roberta Metsola during the first session of the tenth term of the European Parliament

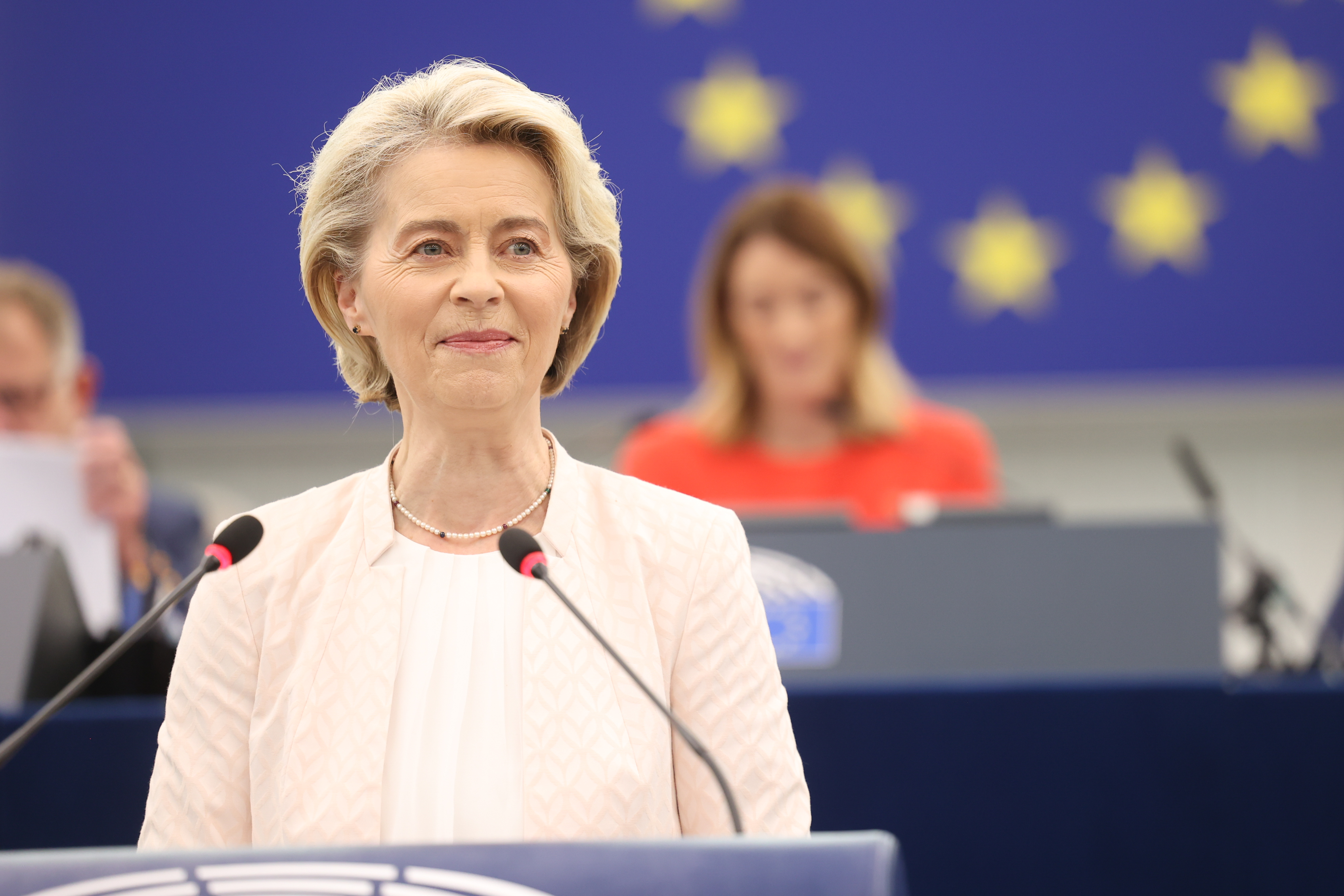
Ursula von der Leyen during her statement for the candidacy of Commission President

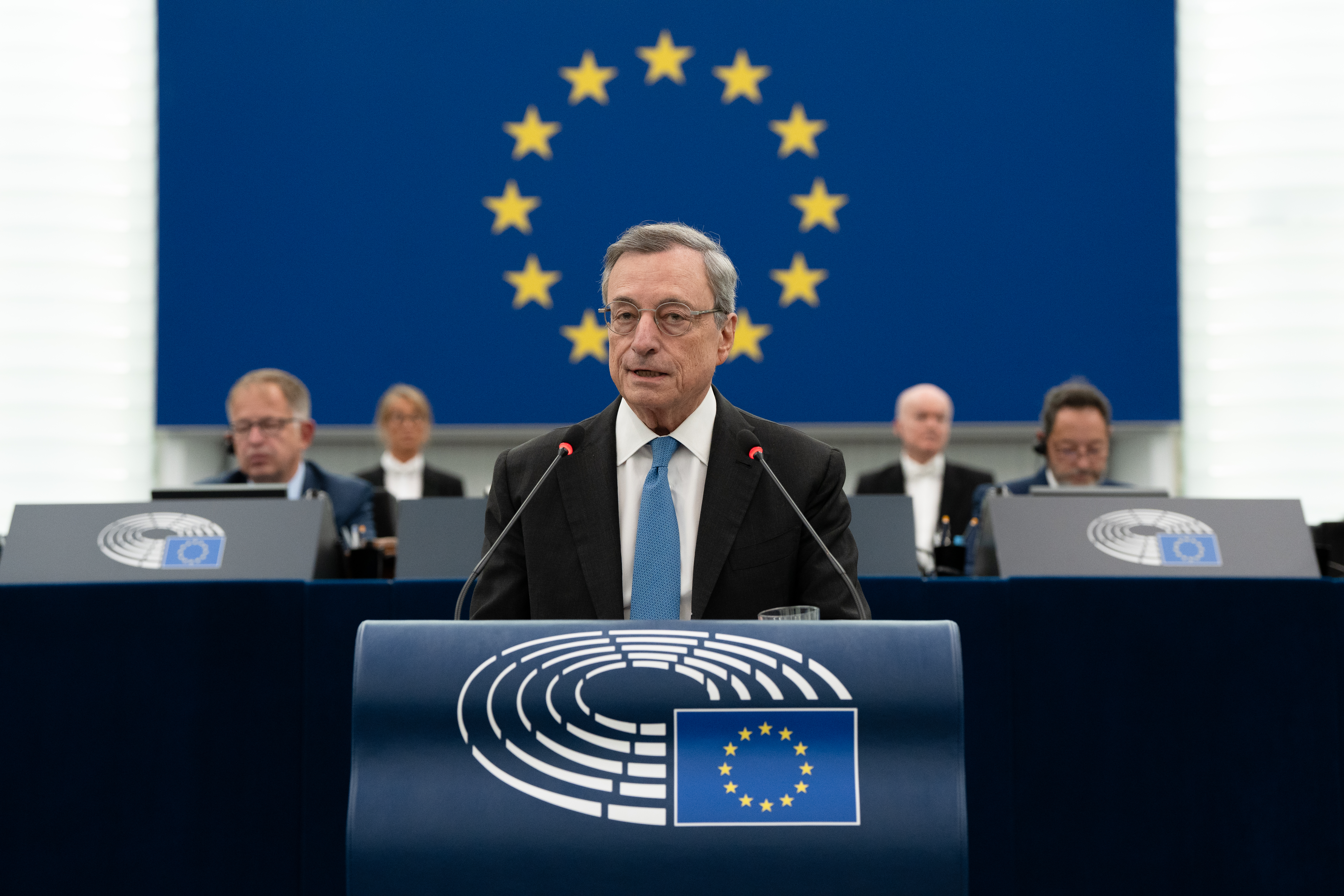
Mario Draghi during his statement on the Draghi report

- 6–9 June 2024: Elections to the 10th European Parliament
- 16–19 July 2024: Constitutive plenary session of the European Parliament
  - 16 July: Roberta Metsola (EPP, ML) is elected President of the Parliament with 562 votes, together with vice-presidents and quaestors.
  - 18 July: Ursula von der Leyen (EPP, DE) is elected President of the European Commission with 401 votes.
- 16–19 September 2024: Plenary session
  - 17 September: Mario Draghi, former President of the European Central Bank, addressed the parliament on the Draghi report about the future of EU competitiveness, followed by a debate with MEPs.

== Major resolutions ==
- 17 July 2024: The need for the EU's continuous support for Ukraine 2024/2721(RSP)

== Groups and parties summary ==
=== Current composition ===
| Political group | European political parties | MEPs |
|---|---|---|
| European People's Party Group (EPP Group) | European People's Party (EPP); European Christian Political Party (ECPP) | 184 / 720 (26%) |
| Progressive Alliance of Socialists and Democrats (S&D) | Party of European Socialists (PES) | 135 / 720 (19%) |
| Patriots for Europe (PfE) | Patriots.eu | 85 / 720 (12%) |
| European Conservatives and Reformists Group (ECR Group) | European Conservatives and Reformists Party (ECR); European Free Alliance (EFA); European Christian Political Party (ECPP) | 84 / 720 (12%) |
| Renew Europe (Renew) | Alliance of Liberals and Democrats for Europe Party (ALDE Party); European Democratic Party (EDP) | 78 / 720 (11%) |
| Greens/European Free Alliance (Greens/EFA) | European Green Party (EGP); European Free Alliance (EFA) | 53 / 720 (7%) |
| The Left in the European Parliament (The Left) | European Left Alliance for the People and the Planet (ELA); Party of the European Left (PEL) | 45 / 720 (6%) |
| Europe of Sovereign Nations Group (ESN) | Europe of Sovereign Nations (ESN) | 27 / 720 (4%) |
| Non-attached members (Non-Inscrits) | | 28 / 720 (4%) |
| Vacant | | 1 / 720 |

=== Historical composition ===
The table below lists the history of the composition of the groups during the Tenth European Parliament.

History of the composition of the groups
| Date | Group | | | | | | | | | Total | Vacant | Ref |
| Date | The Left | S&D | Greens/EFA | Renew | EPP | ECR | Patriots | ESN | NI | Total | Vacant | Ref |
|---|---|---|---|---|---|---|---|---|---|---|---|---|
| 16 Jul 2024 (constitutive plenary session) | 46 | 136 | 53 | 77 | 188 | 78 | 84 | 25 | 32 | 719 | 1 | |
| 23 Aug 2024 | 46 | 135 | 53 | 77 | 188 | 78 | 84 | 25 | 32 | 718 | 2 | |
| 31 Jul 2024 | 46 | 135 | 53 | 77 | 188 | 78 | 83 | 25 | 32 | 717 | 3 | |
| 1 Sep 2024 | 46 | 135 | 53 | 77 | 188 | 78 | 82 | 25 | 32 | 716 | 4 | |
| 5 Sep 2024 | 46 | 136 | 53 | 77 | 188 | 78 | 82 | 25 | 32 | 717 | 3 | |
| 22 Sep 2024 | 46 | 136 | 53 | 77 | 188 | 78 | 83 | 25 | 32 | 718 | 2 | |

== European Parliament Bureau ==
The President of the European Parliament, together with fourteen Vice Presidents and 5 Quaestors are chosen through the votes of Members of the European Parliament (MEPs) serving a term lasting 2.5 years, with the option for re-election.

=== First half of the term ===
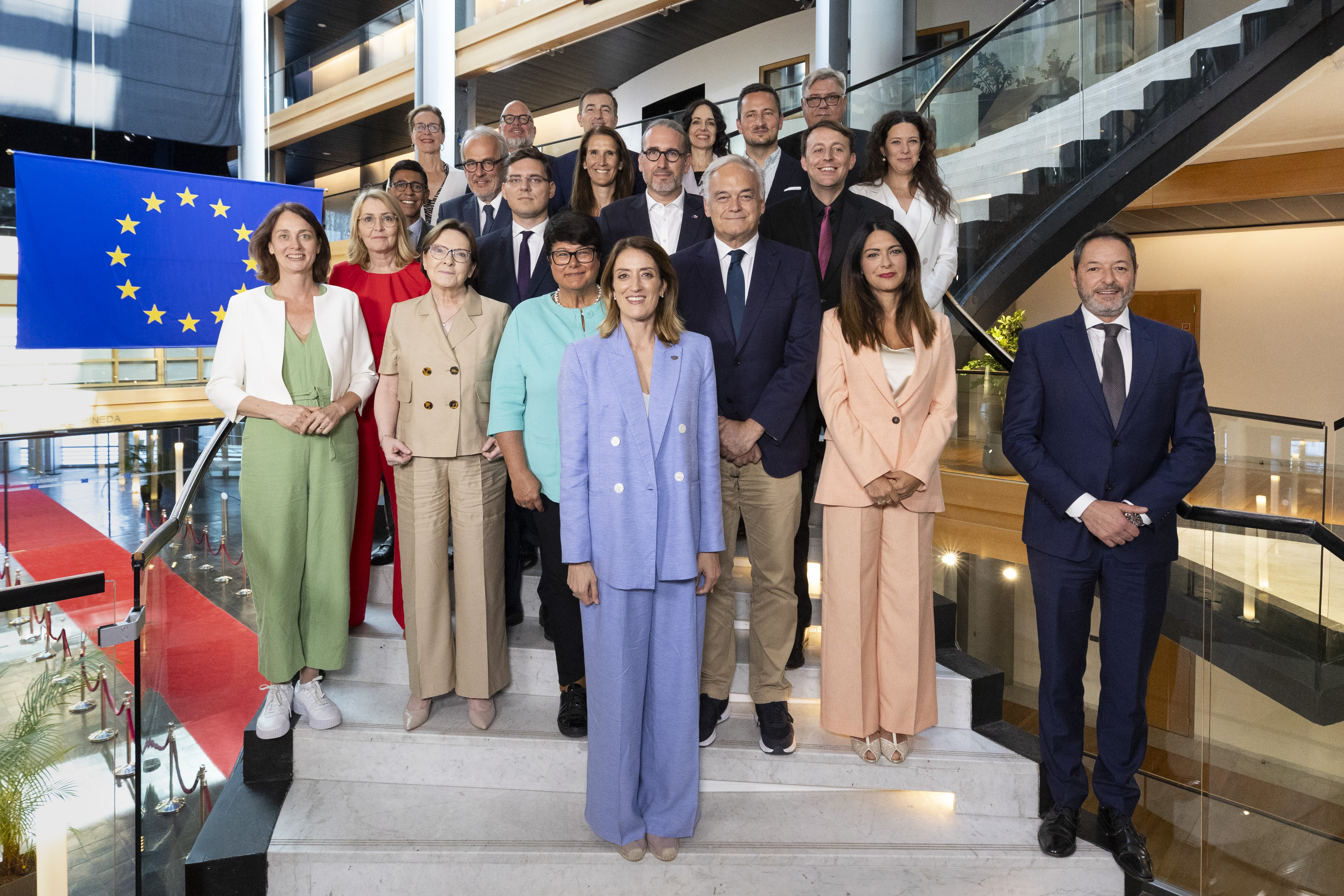
Bureau of the European Parliament (1st Half of the term)

| President | EPP | Roberta Metsola | MLT |
| Vice Presidents | EPP | Sabine Verheyen | GER |
| Vice Presidents | EPP | Ewa Kopacz | POL |
| Vice Presidents | EPP | Esteban González Pons | ESP |
| Vice Presidents | S&D | Katarina Barley | GER |
| Vice Presidents | RENEW | Pina Picierno | ITA |
| Vice Presidents | S&D | Victor Negrescu | ROM |
| Vice Presidents | RENEW | Martin Hojsík | SVK |
| Vice Presidents | S&D | Christel Schaldemose | DEN |
| Vice Presidents | S&D | Javi López | ESP |
| Vice Presidents | RENEW | Sophie Wilmès | BEL |
| Vice Presidents | G/EFA | Nicolae Ștefănuță | ROM |
| Vice Presidents | ECR | Roberts Zīle | LAT |
| Vice Presidents | ECR | Antonella Sberna | ITA |
| Vice Presidents | THE LEFT | Younous Omarjee | FRA |
| Quaestors | EPP | Andrey Kovatchev | BUL |
| Quaestors | S&D | Marc Angel | LUX |
| Quaestors | EPP | Miriam Lexmann | SVK |
| Quaestors | RENEW | Fabienne Keller | FRA |
| Quaestors | ECR | Kosma Złotowski | POL |

== Committees ==
=== Standing committees ===
| Committee | | President | Vice-Presidents | Group Coordinators |
|---|---|---|---|---|
| Foreign Affairs | AFET | (Germany) David McAllister (EPP) | List: (Spain) Hana Jalloul (S&D) (Estonia) Urmas Paet (Renew) (Italy) Alberico Gambino (ECR) (Romania) Ioan-Rareş Bogdan (EPP) | List: (Germany) Michael Gahler (EPP) (Spain) Nacho Sánchez Amor (S&D) (Belgium) Hilde Vautmans (Renew) |
| Human Rights (AFET Subcommittee) | DROI | (France) Mounir Satouri (G/EFA) | List: (Portugal) Marta Temido (S&D) (Poland) Łukasz Kohut (EPP) | List: (Luxembourg) Isabel Wiseler-Lima (EPP) (Portugal) Francisco Assis (S&D) (France) Bernard Guetta (Renew) |
| Security and Defence (AFET Subcommittee) | SEDE | (Germany) Marie-Agnes Strack-Zimmermann (Renew) | List: (France) Christophe Gomart (EPP) (Romania) Mihai Tudose (S&D) (Italy) Alberico Gambino (ECR) (Estonia) Riho Terras (EPP) | List: (Spain) Nicolás Pascual de la Parte (EPP) (Estonia) Sven Mikser (S&D) (France) Nathalie Loiseau (Renew) |
| Employment and Social Affairs | EMPL | (Finland) Li Andersson (The Left) | List: (Sweden) Johan Danielsson (S&D) (Poland) Jagna Marczułajtis-Walczak (EPP) (Germany) Katrin Langensiepen (G/EFA) | List: (Germany) Dennis Radtke (EPP) (Belgium) Estelle Ceulemans (S&D) (Estonia) Jana Toom (Renew) |
| Culture and Education | CULT | (Germany) Nela Riehl (G/EFA) | List: (Poland) Bogdan Andrzej Zdrojewski (EPP) (France) Emma Rafowicz (S&D) (Spain) Diana Riba i Giner (G/EFA) (Bulgaria) Hristo Petrov (Renew) | List: (Hungary) Zoltán Tarr (EPP) (Austria) Hannes Heide (S&D) (France) Laurence Farreng (Renew) |
| Environment, Public Health, and Food Safety | ENVI | (Italy) Antonio Decaro (S&D) | List: (Spain) Esther Herranz García (EPP) (Italy) Pietro Fiocchi (ECR) (Netherlands) Anja Hazekamp (The Left) (Hungary) András Tivadar Kulja (EPP) | List: (Germany) Peter Liese (EPP) (Germany) Tiemo Wölken (S&D) (France) Pascal Canfin (Renew) |
| Public Health (ENVI Subcommittee) | SANT | (Poland) Adam Jarubas (EPP) | List: (Luxembourg) Tilly Metz (G/EFA) (Denmark) Stine Bosse (Renew) (Croatia) Romana Jerković (S&D) (Greece) Emmanouil Fragkos (ECR) | List: (Croatia) Tomislav Sokol (EPP) (Lithuania) Vytenis Povilas Andriukaitis (S&D) (Romania) Vlad Voiculescu (Renew) |
| Legal Affairs | JURI | (Bulgaria) Ilhan Kyuchyuk (Renew) | List: (Germany) Marion Walsmann (EPP) (Italy) Mario Mantovani (ECR) (Netherlands) Lara Wolters (S&D) (Bulgaria) Emil Radev (EPP) | List: (Germany) Axel Voss (EPP) (Germany) René Repasi (S&D) (Lithuania) Dainius Žalimas (Renew) |
| Industry, Research and Energy | ITRE | (Poland) Borys Budka (EPP) | List: (Bulgaria) Tsvetelina Penkova (S&D) (Italy) Elena Donazzan (ECR) (Italy) Giorgio Gori (S&D) (Belgium) Yvan Verougstraete (Renew | List: (Germany) Christian Ehler (EPP) (Romania) Dan Nica (S&D) (France) Christophe Grudler (Renew) |
| Civil Liberties, Justice, and Home Affairs | LIBE | (Spain) Javier Zarzalejos (EPP) | List: (Estonia) Marina Kaljurand (S&D) (Sweden) Charlie Weimers (ECR) (Italy) Alessandro Zan (S&D) (Spain) Estrella Galán (The Left) | List: (Germany) Lena Düpont (EPP) (Germany) Birgit Sippel (S&D) (France) Fabienne Keller (Renew) |
| Development | DEVE | (Republic of Ireland) Barry Andrews (Renew) | List: (Sweden) Isabella Lövin (G/EFA) (Germany) Hildegard Bentele (EPP) (Sweden) Abir Al-Sahlani (Renew) (Poland) Robert Biedroń (S&D) | List: (Austria) Lukas Mandl (EPP) (Germany) Udo Bullmann (S&D) (Luxembourg) Charles Goerens (Renew) |
| Internal Market and Consumer Protection | IMCO | (Germany) Anna Cavazzini (G/EFA) | List: (Germany) Christian Doleschal (EPP) (Bulgaria) Nikola Minchev (Renew) (Romania) Maria Grapini (S&D) (Poland) Kamila Gasiuk-Pihowicz (EPP) | List: (Germany) Andreas Schwab (EPP) (France) Stéphanie Yon-Courtin (Renew) |
| Constitutional Affairs | AFCO | (Germany) Sven Simon (EPP) | List: (Germany) Gabriele Bischoff (S&D) (Spain) Adrián Vázquez Lázara (EPP) (Luxembourg) Charles Goerens (Renew) (Hungary) Péter Magyar (EPP) | List: (Romania) Loránt Vincze (EPP) (Spain) Juan Fernando López Aguilar (S&D) (Italy) Sandro Gozi (Renew) |
| International Trade | INTA | (Germany) Bernd Lange (S&D) | List: (France) Manon Aubry (The Left) (Romania) Iuliu Winkler (EPP) (Sweden) Karin Karlsbro (Renew) (Belgium) Kathleen Van Brempt (S&D) | List: (Sweden) Jörgen Warborn (EPP) (Italy) Brando Benifei (S&D) (France) Marie-Pierre Vedrenne (Renew) |
| Transport and Tourism | TRAN | (Greece) Elissavet Vozemberg-Vrionidi (EPP) | List: (Lithuania) Virginijus Sinkevičius (G/EFA) (Austria) Sophia Kircher (EPP) (Greece) Elena Kountoura (The Left) (Italy) Matteo Ricci (S&D) | List: (Germany) Jens Gieseke (EPP) (Sweden) Johan Danielsson (S&D) (Germany) Jan-Christoph Oetjen (Renew) |
| Women's Rights and Gender Equality | FEMM | (Spain) Lina Gálvez (S&D) | List: (Lithuania) Dainius Žalimas (Renew) (Spain) Irene Montero (The Left) (Spain) Rosa Estaràs (EPP) (Croatia) Predrag Fred Matić (S&D) | List: (Greece) Eleonora Meleti (EPP) (Sweden) Abir Al-Sahlani (Renew) |
| Budgets | BUDG | (Belgium) Johan Van Overtveldt (ECR) | List: (Germany) Monika Hohlmeier (EPP) (Italy) Giuseppe Lupo (S&D) (Poland) Janusz Lewandowski (EPP) (Slovakia) Lucia Yar (Renew) | List: (Croatia) Karlo Ressler (EPP) (France) Jean-Marc Germain (S&D) (Slovakia) Lucia Yar (Renew) |
| Regional Development | REGI | (Romania) Dragoș Benea (S&D) | List: (Hungary) Gabriella Gerzsenyi (EPP) (France) Nora Mebarek (S&D) (Italy) Francesco Ventola (ECR) (Slovakia) Ľubica Karvašová (Renew) | List: (Bulgaria) Andrey Novakov (EPP) (Spain) Marcos Ros Sempere (S&D) (Slovakia) Ľubica Karvašová (Renew) (Slovenia) Vladimir Prebilič (G/EFA) |
| Petitions | PETI | (Poland) Bogdan Rzońca (ECR) | List: (Spain) Dolors Montserrat (EPP) (Greece) Fredis Beleris (EPP) (Latvia) Nils Ušakovs (S&D) (Italy) Cristina Guarda (G/EFA) | List: (Spain) Alma Ezcurra Almansa (EPP) (Spain) Sandra Gómez López (S&D) (Poland) Michał Kobosko (Renew) |
| Budgetary Control | CONT | (Germany) Niclas Herbst (EPP) | List: (Italy) Caterina Chinnici (EPP) (Romania) Cristian Terheș (ECR) (Romania) Claudiu Manda (S&D) (Greece) Georgios Aftias (EPP) | List: (Czech Republic) Tomáš Zdechovský (EPP) (Portugal) Carla Tavares (S&D) (Belgium) Olivier Chastel (Renew) |
| Agriculture and Rural Development | AGRI | (Czech Republic) Veronika Vrecionová (ECR) | List: (Romania) Daniel Buda (EPP) (Germany) Norbert Lins (EPP) (France) Éric Sargiacomo (S&D) | List: (Italy) Herbert Dorfmann (EPP) (Italy) Dario Nardella (S&D) (Finland) Elsi Katainen (Renew) |
| Economic and Monetary Affairs | ECON | (France) Aurore Lalucq (S&D) | List: (Germany) Damian Boeselager (G/EFA) (Slovakia) Ľudovít Ódor (Renew (Czech Republic) Luděk Niedermayer (EPP) (Poland) Marlena Maląg (ECR) | List: (Germany) Markus Ferber (EPP) (Spain) Jonás Fernández Álvarez (S&D) (France) Stéphanie Yon-Courtin (Renew) |
| Tax Matters (ECON Subcommittee) | FISC | (Italy) Pasquale Tridico (The Left) | List: (Denmark) Kira Marie Peter-Hansen (G/EFA) (Republic of Ireland) Regina Doherty (EPP) (Germany) Markus Ferber (EPP) (Germany) Matthias Ecke (S&D) | List: (Spain) Fernando Navarrete Rojas (EPP) (Portugal) Bruno Gonçalves (S&D) (Slovakia) Ľudovít Ódor (Renew) |
| Fisheries | PECH | (Spain) Carmen Crespo Díaz (EPP) | List: (Netherlands) Sander Smit (EPP) (Italy) Giuseppe Milazzo (ECR) (France) Stéphanie Yon-Courtin (Renew) (Sweden) Jessica Polfjärd (EPP) | List: (Spain) Gabriel Mato (EPP) (Portugal) André Rodrigues (S&D) (Sweden) Emma Wiesner (Renew) |
Source: European Parliament

==== Leadership statistics ====
Chairs

No chairpeople: PfE and ESN (due to cordon sanitaire)

| Germany | 7 |
| Poland, Spain | 3 |
| France, Italy | 2 |
| Finland, Bulgaria, Ireland, Greece, Belgium, Romania, Czechia | 1 |

No chair-people: Sweden, Estonia, Netherlands, Hungary, Slovakia, Luxembourg, Denmark, Croatia, Lithuania, Portugal, Austria, Latvia, Slovenia, Malta, Cyprus

Vice-Chairs

No vice-chairpeople: PfE and ESN (due to cordon sanitaire)

| Italy | 13 |
| Germany | 10 |
| Spain, Romania | 7 |
| Sweden | 6 |
| Poland, France | 5 |
| Greece | 4 |
| Estonia, Netherlands, Hungary, Bulgaria, Slovakia | 3 |
| Luxembourg, Denmark, Croatia, Belgium, Lithuania | 2 |
| Portugal, Austria, Latvia, Czechia, Ireland | 1 |

No vice-chairpeople: Slovenia, Malta, Cyprus, Finland

== European Commission formation ==
=== Election of president ===
European Council proposed on 27 June 2024 Ursula von der Leyen as a candidate for a second term as President of the European Commission. European Parliament's secret vote took place on 18 July 2024.

| Candidate | | | Members | Voting | Majority | In favor | Against | Blank | Void |
|---|---|---|---|---|---|---|---|---|---|
| Ursula von der Leyen | Germany | EPP | 719 | 707 | 360 | 401 | 284 | 15 | 7 |
Source: European Parliament

=== Hearings of commissioner candidates ===
President-elect of the Commission will propose to the European Parliament candidates for members of the Commission.

== See also ==
- 2024 European Parliament election
- European Parliament
- Political groups of the European Parliament
- Institutions of the European Union
