= European Parliament Committee on Agriculture and Rural Development =

Committee on Agriculture and Rural Development
- Abbreviation: AGRI
- Type: Standing committee
- Legislature: European Parliament
- Parliamentary term: 10th European Parliament
- Chair: Veronika Vrecionová; ECR, Czechia
- Vice-Chairs: Daniel Buda (EPP); Norbert Lins (EPP); Eric Sargiacomo (S&D); Krzysztof Hetman (EPP)
- Members: 49
- Political composition: EPP: 13 · S&D: 9 · Renew: 6 PfE: 6 · ECR: 5 · Greens/EFA: 4 · The Left: 3 · ESN: 2 · NI: 1
- Jurisdiction: Agriculture, rural development, agricultural markets and the Common Agricultural Policy
- Website: Official website

The Committee on Agriculture and Rural Development (AGRI) is a standing committee of the European Parliament. It is responsible for matters relating to the Common Agricultural Policy, rural development, agricultural markets, animal health and welfare, plant health, agricultural production, forestry and agroforestry.

== Responsibilities ==
The Committee on Agriculture and Rural Development is responsible for matters relating to the Common Agricultural Policy and its implementation and development. Its remit also includes rural development, agricultural markets, the economic position of farmers, agricultural production and the quality of agricultural products.

The committee also deals with legislation and policy concerning:

- animal health, animal husbandry and animal welfare;
- plant health and plant-protection matters;
- animal feed, where the measures concerned are not primarily intended to protect human health;
- forestry and agroforestry;
- the supply of agricultural inputs and raw materials; and
- the Community Plant Variety Office.

A central part of the committee's work is examining legislative proposals submitted by the European Commission. In areas governed by the ordinary legislative procedure, the committee prepares Parliament's position for negotiation with the Council of the European Union and for subsequent consideration in plenary.

== Members ==
=== 10th Parliament, 2024–2029 ===
The committee consists of 49 full members. Its current composition is shown below, with the chair and vice-chairs indicated in italics.

European People's Party	Progressive Alliance of Socialists and Democrats	European Conservatives and Reformists	Renew Europe
Daniel Buda, Romania, Vice-Chair; Norbert Lins, Germany, Vice-Chair; Krzysztof Hetman, Poland, Vice-Chair; Carmen Crespo Díaz, Spain; Salvatore De Meo, Italy; Paulo do Nascimento Cabral, Portugal; Herbert Dorfmann, Italy; Gabriella Gerzsenyi, Hungary; Céline Imart, France; Stefan Köhler, Germany; Willemien Koning, Netherlands; Pekka Toveri, Finland; Maria Walsh, Ireland	Eric Sargiacomo, France, Vice-Chair; Stefano Bonaccini, Italy; Gheorghe Cârciu, Romania; André Franqueira Rodrigues, Portugal; Maria Grapini, Romania; Camilla Laureti, Italy; Cristina Maestre, Spain; Dario Nardella, Italy; Maria Noichl, Germany	Veronika Vrecionová, Czechia, Chair; Waldemar Buda, Poland; Carlo Fidanza, Italy; Bert-Jan Ruissen, Netherlands; Jessika van Leeuwen, Netherlands	Asger Christensen, Denmark; Barry Cowen, Ireland; Jérémy Decerle, France; Elsi Katainen, Finland; Ciaran Mullooly, Ireland; Christine Singer, Germany
Patriots for Europe	Greens–European Free Alliance	The Left	Europe of Sovereign Nations
Mireia Borrás Pabón, Spain; Valérie Deloge, France; Csaba Dömötör, Hungary; Tomáš Kubín, Czechia; Gilles Pennelle, France; Raffaele Stancanelli, Italy	Cristina Guarda, Italy; Martin Häusling, Germany; Anna Strolenberg, Netherlands; Thomas Waitz, Austria	Sebastian Everding, Germany; Luke Ming Flanagan, Ireland; Arash Saeidi, France	Arno Bausemer, Germany; Ivan David, Czechia
Non-Inscrits			
Katarína Roth Neveďalová, Slovakia			

==== Substitute members ====
Substitute members of the 10th Parliament (click “show” to expand)

The committee's substitute members are listed below.

European People's Party	Progressive Alliance of Socialists and Democrats	European Conservatives and Reformists	Renew Europe
Peter Agius, Malta; Wouter Beke, Belgium; Alexander Bernhuber, Austria; Lena Düpont, Germany; Esther Herranz García, Spain; Emmanouil Kefalogiannis, Greece; Ilia Lazarov, Bulgaria; Gabriel Mato, Spain; Alexandra Mehnert, Germany; Dan-Ștefan Motreanu, Romania; Jessica Polfjärd, Sweden; Marion Walsmann, Germany; Marta Wcisło, Poland	Sakis Arnaoutoglou, Greece; Annalisa Corrado, Italy; Claire Fita, France; Heléne Fritzon, Sweden; Iratxe García Pérez, Spain; Elena Sancho Murillo, Spain; Marta Temido, Portugal; Marko Vešligaj, Croatia	Emmanouil Fragkos, Greece; Nicola Procaccini, Italy; Claudiu-Richard Târziu, Romania; Georgiana Teodorescu, Romania; Francesco Ventola, Italy	Benoît Cassart, Belgium; Charles Goerens, Luxembourg; Emma Wiesner, Sweden; Michal Wiezik, Slovakia
Patriots for Europe	Greens–European Free Alliance	The Left	Europe of Sovereign Nations
Barbara Bonte, Belgium; Marie Dauchy, France; Ton Diepeveen, Netherlands; Gerald Hauser, Austria; Vilis Krištopans, Latvia; Isabella Tovaglieri, Italy	David Cormand, France; Pär Holmgren, Sweden; Tilly Metz, Luxembourg; Nicolae Ștefănuță, Romania	Giuseppe Antoci, Italy; Konstantinos Arvanitis, Greece; Anja Hazekamp, Netherlands	Zsuzsanna Borvendég, Hungary; Stanislav Stoyanov, Bulgaria
Non-Inscrits			
Luis-Vicențiu Lazarus, Romania			

=== 8th Parliament, 2014–2019 ===
The following table records the committee's membership during the eighth parliamentary term.

Members of the 8th Parliament, 2014–2019

European People's Party	Progressive Alliance of Socialists and Democrats	European Conservatives and Reformists	Alliance of Liberals and Democrats for Europe
Czesław Siekierski, Poland, Chair; Daniel Buda, Romania; Michel Dantin, France; Albert Dess, Germany; Herbert Dorfmann, Italy; Norbert Erdős, Hungary; Esther Herranz García, Spain; Peter Jahr, Germany; Jarosław Kalinowski, Poland; Elisabeth Köstinger, Austria; Mairead McGuinness, Ireland; Nuno Melo, Portugal; Marijana Petir, Croatia	Éric Andrieu, France, Vice-Chair; Clara Aguilera García, Spain, Vice-Chair; Vasilica Dăncilă, Romania, Vice-Chair; Paul Brannen, United Kingdom; Nicola Caputo, Italy; Paolo De Castro, Italy; Maria Noichl, Germany; Constantin Rebega, Romania; Marc Tarabella, Belgium	Janusz Wojciechowski, Poland, Vice-Chair; Richard Ashworth, United Kingdom; Beata Gosiewska, Poland; Zbigniew Kuźmiuk, Poland; Jim Nicholson, United Kingdom	Jan Huitema, Netherlands; Ulrike Müller, Germany; Marit Paulsen, Sweden; Jens Rohde, Denmark
European United Left–Nordic Green Left	The Greens–European Free Alliance	Europe of Freedom and Direct Democracy	Non-Inscrits
Matt Carthy, Ireland; Luke Ming Flanagan, Ireland; Anja Hazekamp, Netherlands; Lidia Senra, Spain	José Bové, France; Martin Häusling, Germany; Bronis Ropė, Lithuania; Jordi Sebastià, Spain	Stuart Agnew, United Kingdom; Giulia Moi, Italy; Marco Zullo, Italy	Diane Dodds, United Kingdom; Édouard Ferrand, France; Philippe Loiseau, France

== Chairs ==
The following table lists the chairs of the committee since 2014.

Name	Political group	Member state	Took office	Left office
Czesław Siekierski	EPP	Poland	7 July 2014	July 2019
Norbert Lins	EPP	Germany	July 2019	July 2024
Veronika Vrecionová	ECR	(Czech Republic) Czechia	July 2024	Incumbent

== Research support ==
The committee's work is supported by the research services of the European Parliament. These services provide studies, in-depth analyses, briefings and impact assessments to assist parliamentary committees in their legislative and scrutiny work.

Research relating specifically to agriculture and rural development is principally prepared or commissioned by the Parliament's Policy Department for Structural and Cohesion Policies and by the European Parliamentary Research Service. Its work covers subjects such as the Common Agricultural Policy, farm incomes, agricultural markets, rural development, food systems, environmental policy and the implementation of European Union legislation.

The resulting publications are made available through the committee's online database of supporting analyses and through the European Parliament's Think Tank. The database is updated as new studies and briefings are published.

== See also ==
- Agriculture and Fisheries Council
- European Commissioner for Agriculture and Rural Development
- Directorate-General for Agriculture and Rural Development
