= Maria Noichl =

German politician

Maria Noichl MEP
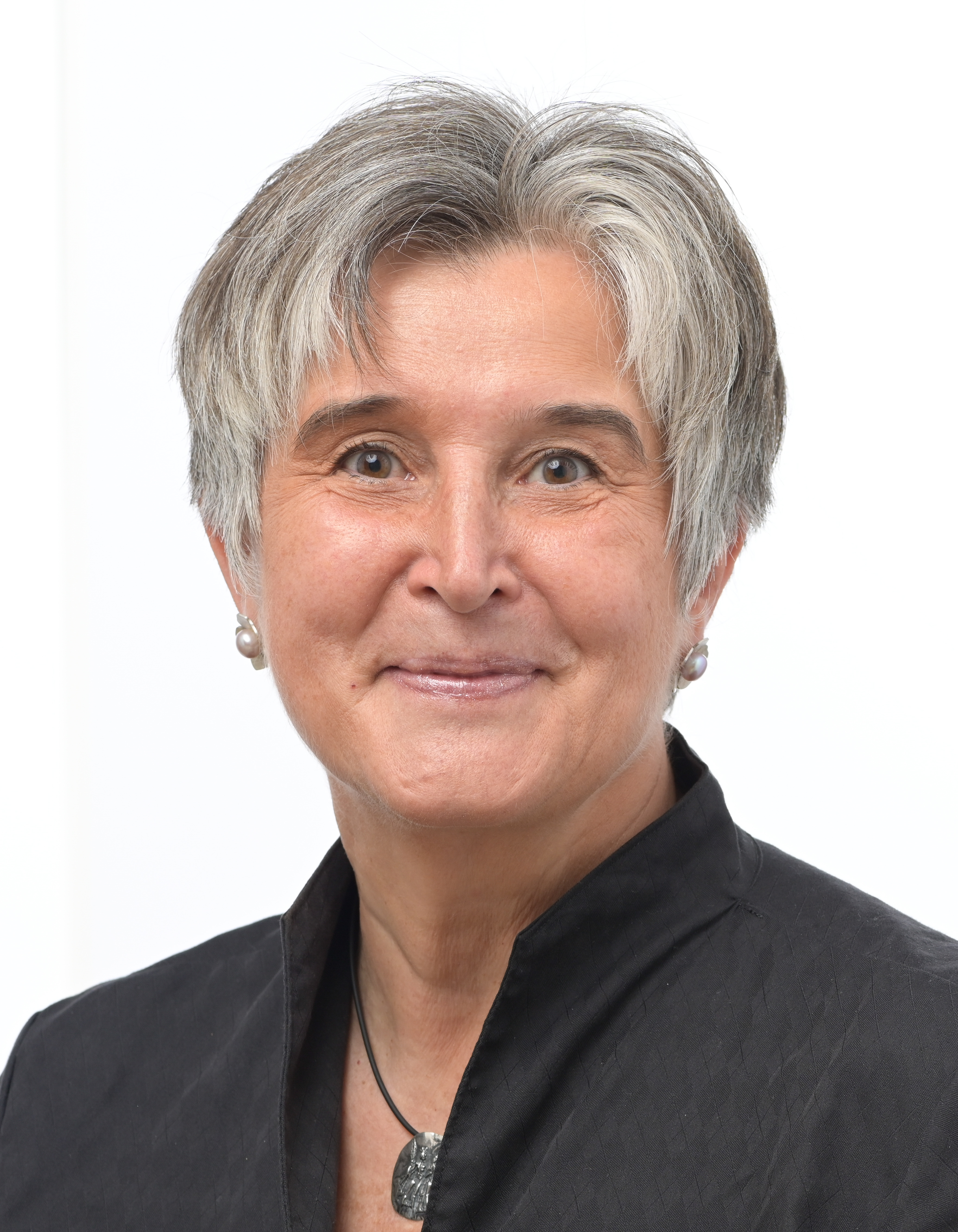

Member of the European Parliament
- Incumbent
- Assumed office 1 July 2014
- Constituency: Germany

Personal details
- Born: 9 January 1967 (age 59) Rosenheim, Bavaria, Germany
- Party: German; Social Democratic Party; European Union; Party of European Socialists

Maria Noichl (born 9 January 1967) is a German politician and member of the European Parliament representing Germany since July 2014. She is a member of the Social Democratic Party, part of the Party of European Socialists.

Prior to entering politics Noichl was a teacher of nutrition and design.

== Early life and education ==
Born in Rosenheim, Noichl completed her secondary education in 1983 and trained as a master of home economics. She later earned her vocational diploma (Fachhochschulreife) and trained as a specialist teacher for nutrition and design. From 1995 to 2008, she worked as a teacher at primary and secondary schools in Rosenheim.

== Political career ==
=== Career in state politics ===
Noichl joined the SPD in 1991 and was elected to the Rosenheim city council in 2002. In the 2008 Bavarian state election, she was elected to the Bavarian Landtag, where she served until 2013 as a member of the Committee on Food, Agriculture, and Forestry.

== Parliamentary service ==
- Member, Committee on Women's Rights and Gender Equality (2014-)
- Member, Committee on Agriculture and Rural Development (2014-)
- Member, Delegation to the ACP–EU Joint Parliamentary Assembly (2014-)
- Member, Delegation to the Euro-Latin American Parliamentary Assembly (2014-2014)

In addition to her committee assignments, Noichl is a member of the European Parliament Intergroup on the Welfare and Conservation of Animals.

=== Organizational roles ===
From 2018 to 2025, Noichl served as the federal chairwoman of the Working Group of Social Democratic Women (AsF). Since 2022, she has chaired the German Association for Landcare (DVL).

== Personal life ==
Noichl has two sons and five grandchildren.

== Other activities ==
- German United Services Trade Union (ver.di), Member
