= Martin Häusling =

German politician (born 1961)

Martin Häusling MEP
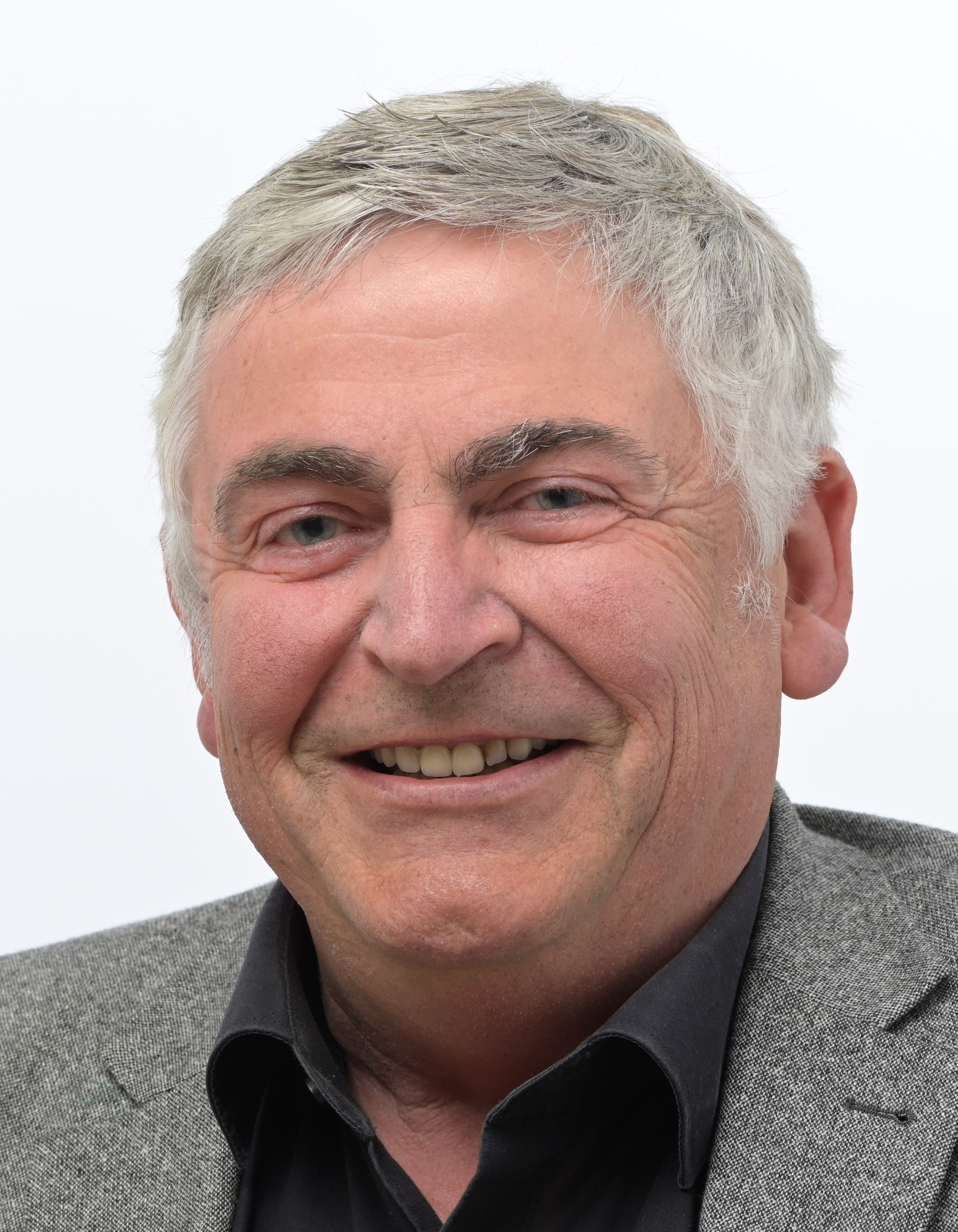

Member of the European Parliament
- Incumbent
- Assumed office 14 July 2009
- Constituency: Germany

Personal details
- Born: 26 March 1961 (age 65) Bad Wildungen, Germany
- Party: German: Alliance 90/The Greens; EU: The Greens–European Free Alliance
- Website: www.martin-haeusling.eu

Martin Karl Christian Häusling (born 26 March 1961) is a German politician and member of the European Parliament from Germany. He is a member of the Alliance 90/The Greens, part of the European Green Party.

== Early life ==
Häusling was born in Bad Wildungen. Before entering politics, Häusling managed his family's 75 hectare organic farm near Kassel.

== Political career ==
=== Career in state politics ===
Häusling entered local politics in 1981. He was elected to the Landtag of Hesse in 2003, but he failed to retain his seat at the following election in 2008.

=== Member of the European Parliament, 2009–present ===
Although he successfully stood at the subsequent early election in 2009, Häusling resigned his seat shortly afterwards when he was elected to the European Parliament. He has since been serving on the Committee on Agriculture and Rural Development, where he is his parliamentary group's rapporteur on organic production and labelling of organic products. He also served on the Committee on Budgetary Control between 2009 and 2014.

In addition to his committee assignments, Häusling has been a member of the Parliament's delegation to the Euro-Latin American Parliamentary Assembly. He is also a member of the European Parliament Intergroup on Climate Change, Biodiversity and Sustainable Development, the European Parliament Intergroup on the Welfare and Conservation of Animals and the MEP Heart Group, a group of parliamentarians who have an interest in promoting measures that will help reduce the burden of cardiovascular diseases (CVD).

In the negotiations to form a so-called traffic light coalition of the Social Democratic Party (SPD), the Green Party and the Free Democratic Party (FDP) following the 2021 federal elections, Häusling was part of his party's delegation in the working group on agriculture and nutrition, co-chaired by Till Backhaus, Renate Künast and Carina Konrad.
