= Herbert Dorfmann =

Italian agronomist and politician

Herbert Dorfmann MEP
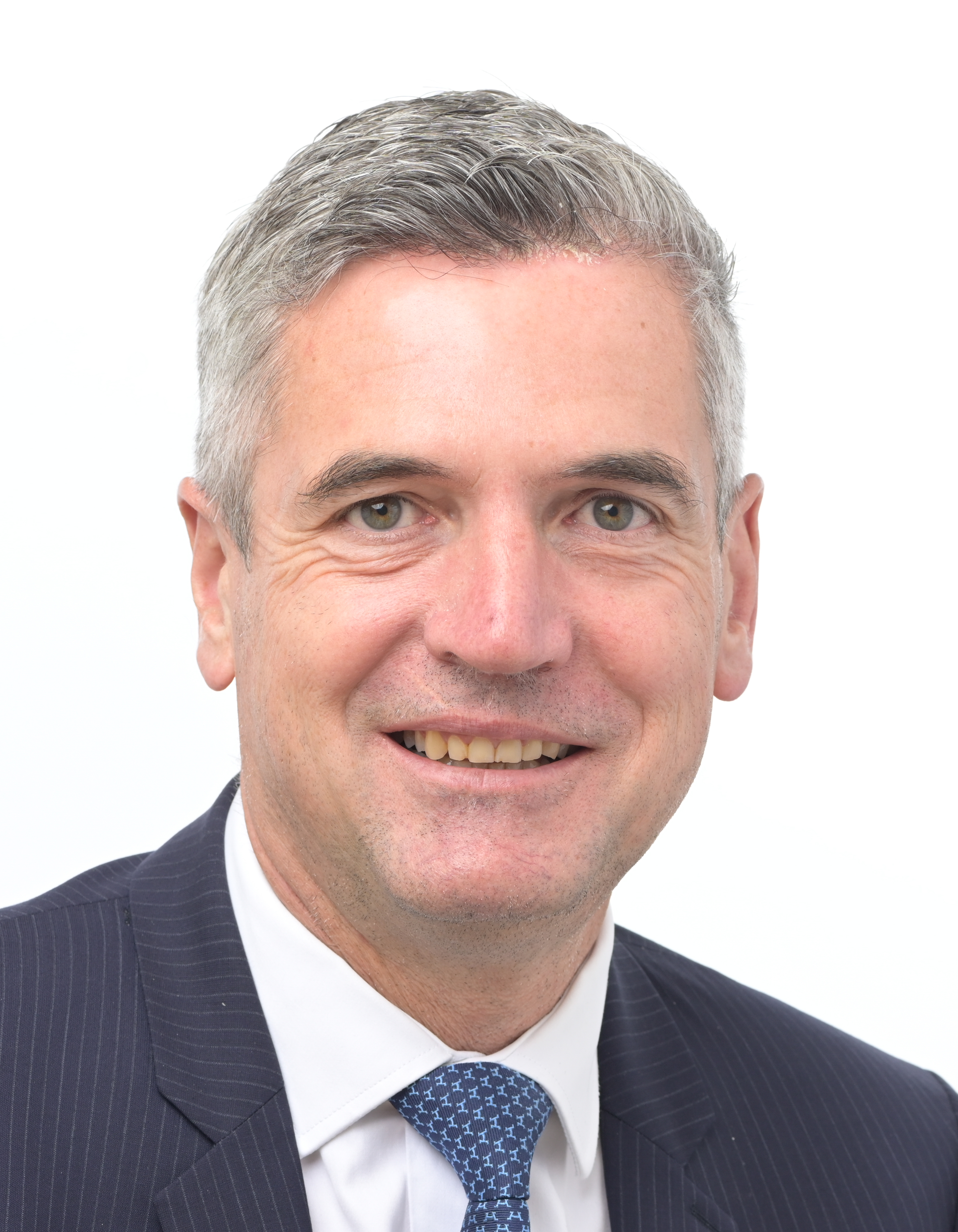

Member of the European Parliament
- Incumbent
- Assumed office 1 July 2009
- Constituency: North-East Italy

Personal details
- Born: 4 March 1969 (age 57) Brixen, South Tyrol, Italy
- Party: South Tyrolean People's Party
- Education: Università Cattolica del Sacro Cuore
- Profession: Politician, agronomist

Herbert Dorfmann (born 4 March 1969 in Brixen, South Tyrol) is an Italian agronomist and politician of the South Tyrolean People's Party (SVP) who has been serving as a Member of the European Parliament since 2009.

== Personal life ==
Dorfmann was born in Brixen. After graduating from high school, Dorfmann studied agricultural sciences in Piacenza and he started teaching in the agricultural school of Auer. He then became the head of the department for agriculture in the chamber of commerce in Bolzano. After that Dorfmann became the director of the South Tyrolean farmers' association, a position he occupied for nearly ten years. Dorfmann is married and father of two sons.

== Political career ==
From 2005 to 2009, Dorfmann served as mayor of Feldthurns. He is also the chairman of the South Tyrolean People's Party in the Eisacktal district and therefore a member of both the party's leadership and its executive committee.

In the 2009 European election, Dorfmann was elected as a Member of the European Parliament with the list of the South Tyrolean People's Party (SVP). He has since been serving on the Committee on Agriculture and Rural Development, where he is his parliamentary group's coordinator. Along with Norbert Lins, he is also his group's co-rapporteur on the reform of the Common Agricultural Policy. In 2020, he also joined the Subcommittee on Tax Matters.

Within the European People's Party (EPP), Dorfmann serves on the governing board.

In addition to his committee assignments, Dorfmann has been part of the Parliament's delegations to the Euro-Latin American Parliamentary Assembly (since 2019) and for relations with the countries of Southeast Asia and the Association of Southeast Asian Nations (since 2021).
