= Iliya Lazarov =

Bulgarian politician (born 1965)

Iliya Lazarov MEP
- Илия Лазаров
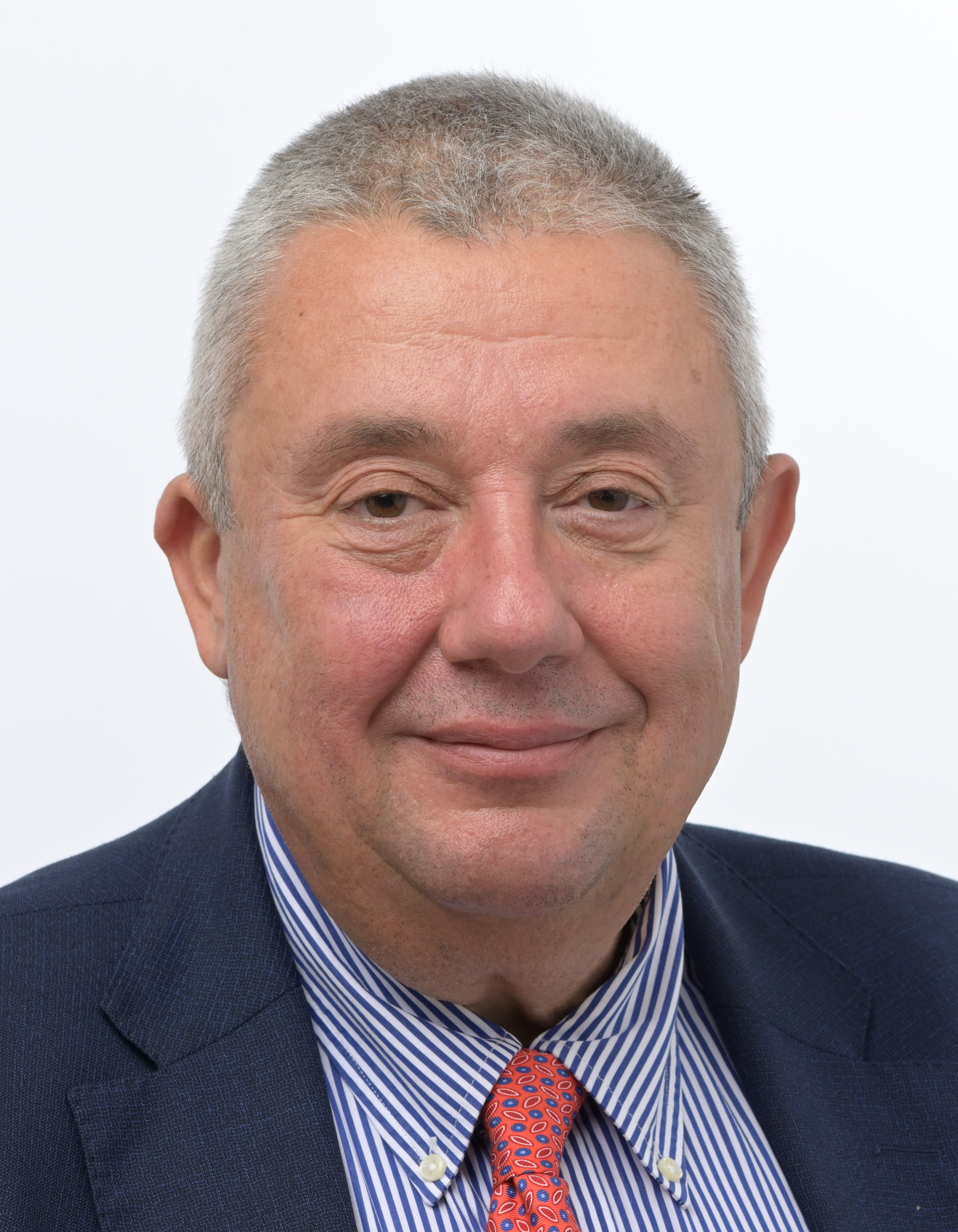

Member of the European Parliament
- Incumbent
- Assumed office 16 July 2024
- Constituency: Bulgaria

Chairman of the Union of Democratic Forces
- Incumbent
- Assumed office 4 July 2026
- Preceded by: Rumen Hristov

Personal details
- Born: 19 September 1965 (age 60) Sofia, Bulgaria
- Party: GERB–SDS
- Occupation: Politician

Iliya Dimitrov Lazarov (Bulgarian: Илия Димитров Лазаров; born 19 September 1965) is a Bulgarian politician from GERB–SDS. He was elected Member of the European Parliament (MEP) in the 2024 European Parliament election. In July 2026, he became the chairman of the Union of Democratic Forces.

== See also ==
- List of members of the European Parliament for Bulgaria, 2024–2029
