= Aurore Lalucq =

French economist and politician (born 1979)

Aurore Lalucq MEP
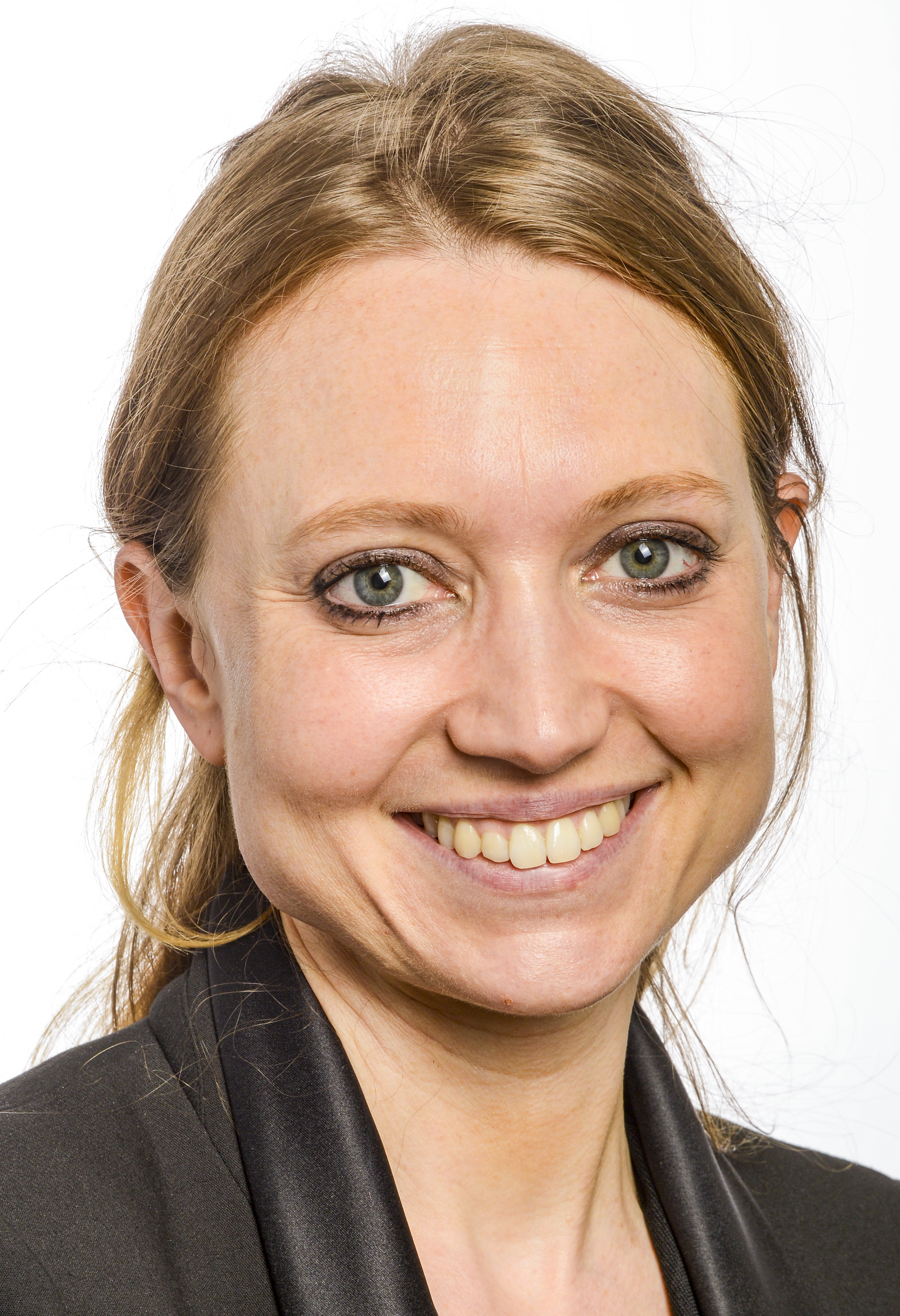

President of the Economic and Monetary Affairs Committee of the European Parliament
- Incumbent
- Assumed office 23 July 2024
- Parliament: 10th
- Preceded by: Irene Tinagli

Member of the European Parliament
- Incumbent
- Assumed office 2 July 2019
- Parliament: 9th and 10th
- Election: 26 May 2019; 9 June 2024
- Constituency: France

Personal details
- Born: 17 April 1979 (age 47) Longjumeau, France
- Party: Génération.s (2017-2019); Place Publique (since 2019)
- Education: Paris Dauphine University; Panthéon-Sorbonne University
- Occupation: Economist

Aurore Lalucq (French pronunciation: [ɔʁɔʁ lalyk]; born 17 April 1979) is a French economist and politician of the Place Publique party who has been serving as a Member of the European Parliament (MEP) since 2019. She is the co-president of the political party Place publique.

== Political career ==
In parliament, Lalucq has since been serving on the Committee on Economic and Monetary Affairs. In 2020, she also joined the Subcommittee on Tax Matters. She has also been a substitute member of the Committee on International Trade (2019–2021) and the Committee on Employment and Social Affairs (since 2021).

In addition to her committee assignments, Lalucq is part of the Parliament's delegation for relations with the United States. She is also a member of the European Parliament Intergroup on Climate Change, Biodiversity and Sustainable Development, the European Parliament Intergroup on LGBT Rights and the Responsible Business Conduct Working Group.

Lalucq was re-elected as an MEP in 2024.

== Other activities ==
- European Council on Foreign Relations (ECFR), Member of the Council (since 2023)

== Political positions ==
In May 2021, Lalucq joined a group of 39 mostly Green Party lawmakers from the European Parliament who in a letter urged the leaders of Germany, France and Italy not to support Arctic LNG 2, a $21 billion Russian Arctic liquefied natural gas (LNG) project, due to climate change concerns.

In 2022, Lalucq urged France's market regulator AMF to review its decision to register the Binance cryptocurrency exchange as a digital assets service provider, citing a Reuters investigation into money laundering on the platform.
