= Arash Saeidi =

French politician (born 1975)

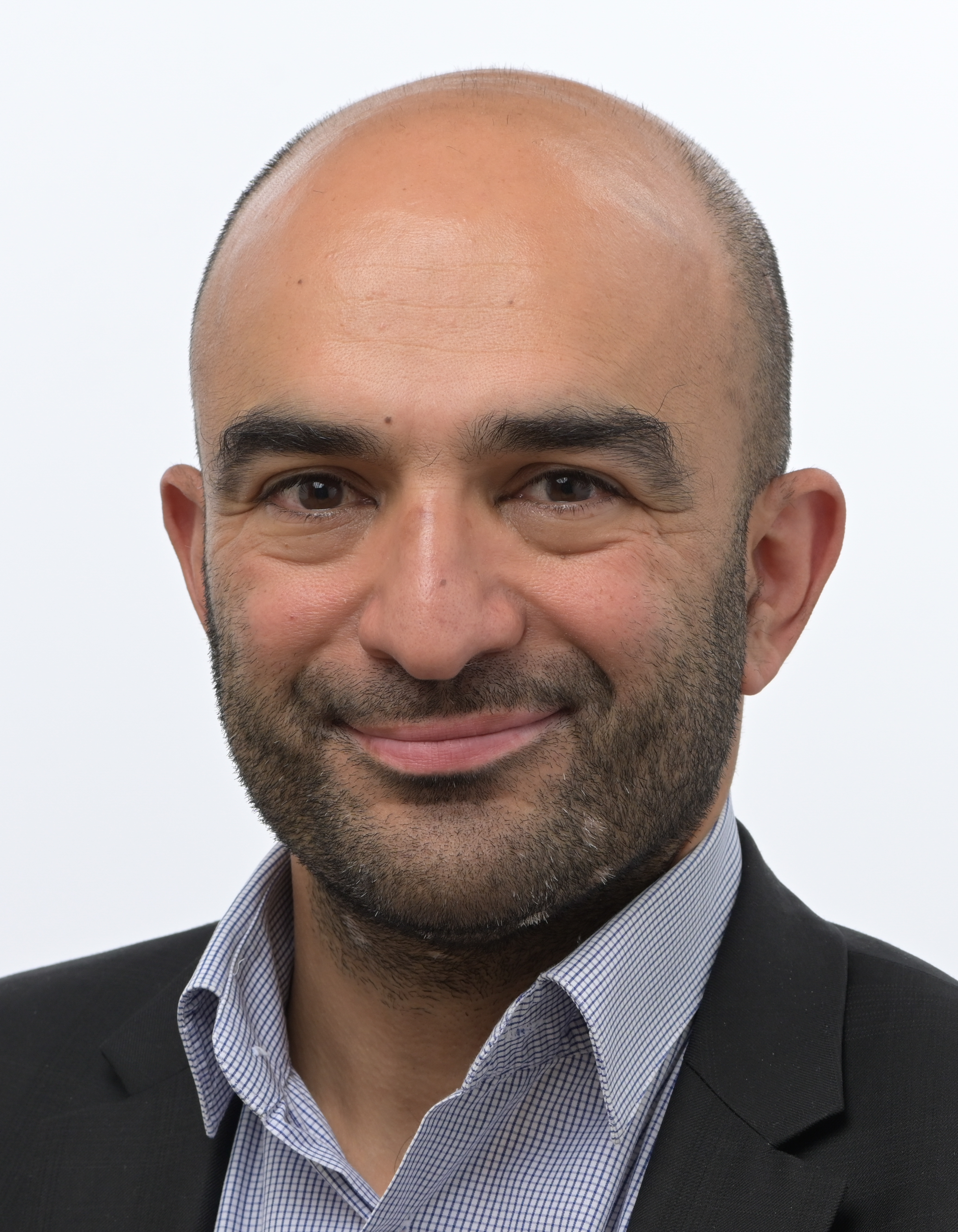
- Official portrait, 2024

Member of the European Parliament for France
- Incumbent
- Assumed office 16 July 2024

Member of the Municipal council of Angers
- Incumbent
- Assumed office 25 May 2020
- Mayor: Christophe Béchu

Personal details
- Born: Arash Saeidi Akbarzadeh; 25 May 1975 (age 50) Tehran, Iran
- Citizenship: France
- Party: LFI (2024–present)
- Other political affiliations: PS (2007–2018); G.s (2018–2024)

Arash Saeidi Akbarzadeh (born 25 May 1975) is a French politician who was first elected as a Member of the European Parliament in 2024.
