= Alexandra Mehnert =

German politician (born 1974)

Alexandra Mehnert MEP
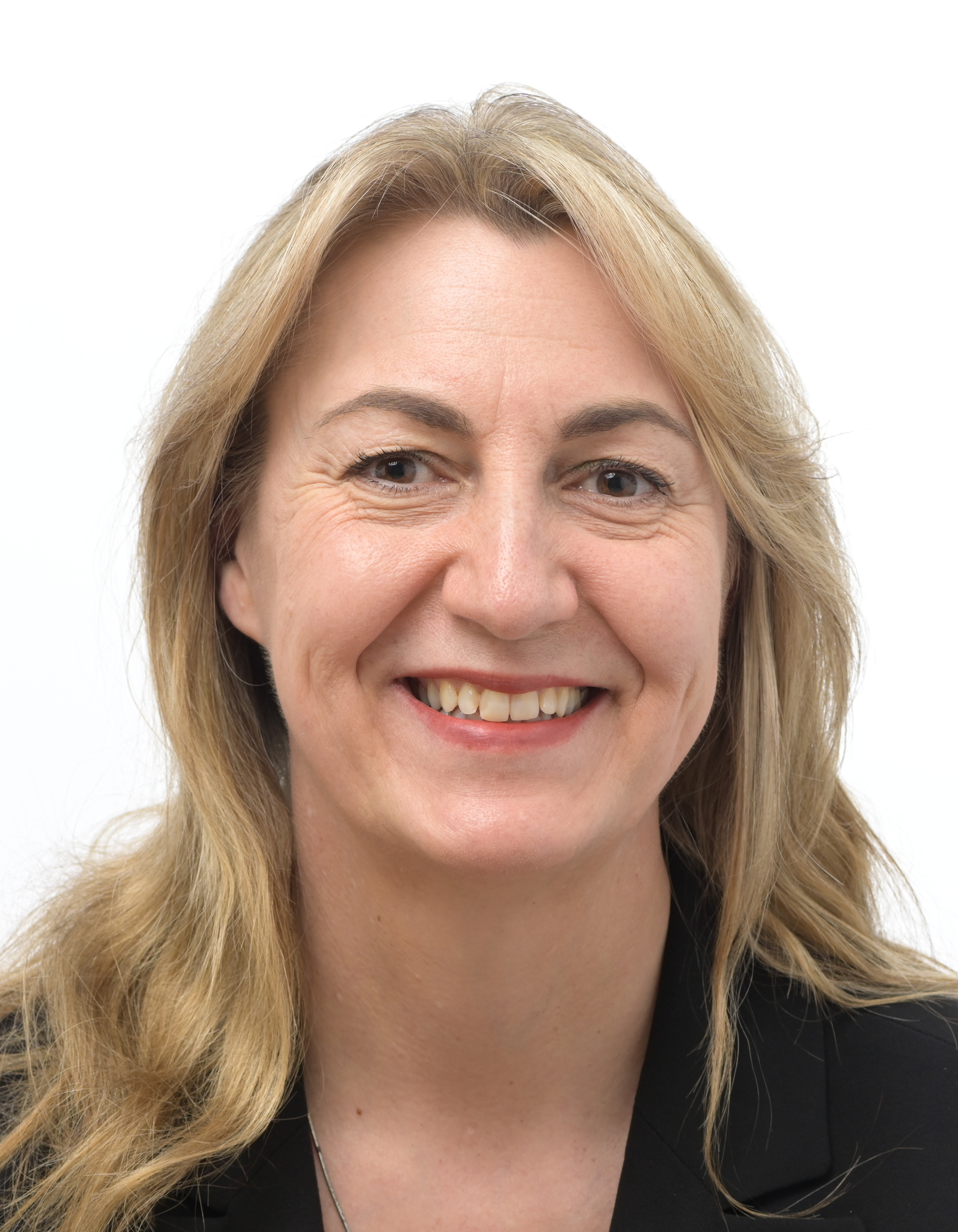

Member of the European Parliament for Germany
- Incumbent
- Assumed office 16 July 2024

Personal details
- Born: 6 August 1974 (age 52) Magdeburg, German Democratic Republic.
- Party: German: Christian Democratic Union; EU: European People's Party Group
- Education: Otto von Guericke University Magdeburg

Alexandra Mehnert (born 1974) is a German politician as a member of the Christian Democratic Union of Germany (CDU) party. She was elected a member of the European Parliament in the 2024 European elections.

== Early life and education ==
Mehnert was born on 6 August 1974 in Magdeburg in the former German Democratic Republic. Magdeburg is now the capital of the state of Saxony-Anhalt. She graduated from high school in Magdeburg in 1993 and then studied political science, sociology and education at the Otto von Guericke University Magdeburg. She received a scholarship to do this from the Konrad Adenauer Foundation, which is associated with, but independent from, the CDU. In 1998 she received a Master of Arts degree.

== Career ==
Since obtaining her master's degree she has worked for the Konrad Adenauer Foundation in various positions. From 1998 she was head of the Schloss Wendgräben Vocational School. She then became the head of the Europe Direct Information Centre in Magdeburg, run by the same foundation, and briefly worked at the Erfurt Vocational School as a parental leave replacement. Until her election to the European Parliament, she was head of the Saxony-Anhalt Political Education Forum, which is also supported by the Konrad Adenauer Foundation.

== Political career ==
In 1990, Mehnert joined the Young Union, a youth organization of the CDU and its coalition partner, the Christian Social Union in Bavaria (CSU). She joined the CDU in 1991 and the Christian Democratic Employees' Association (CDA), which is an organization connected with the CDU, in 1993. She was a co-founder of the Saxony-Anhalt Young Union and its chair from 1991 to 1994. She was a member of the Saxony-Anhalt CDU state executive committee from 2000 to 2006, and held that position again from September 2023.

== European Parliament ==
Mehnert was an unsuccessful candidate in the 2004 European elections. On 10 June 2023, she was chosen as the top candidate for the CDU in Saxony-Anhalt for the 2024 European elections. In the election on 9 June 2024, she was elected to the European Parliament, where she joined the European People's Party Group and became a member of the Committee on Transport and Tourism. Her campaign material stressed the importance she attached to the European Union.
