= Stefan Köhler =

German politician (born 1967)

Stefan Köhler MEP
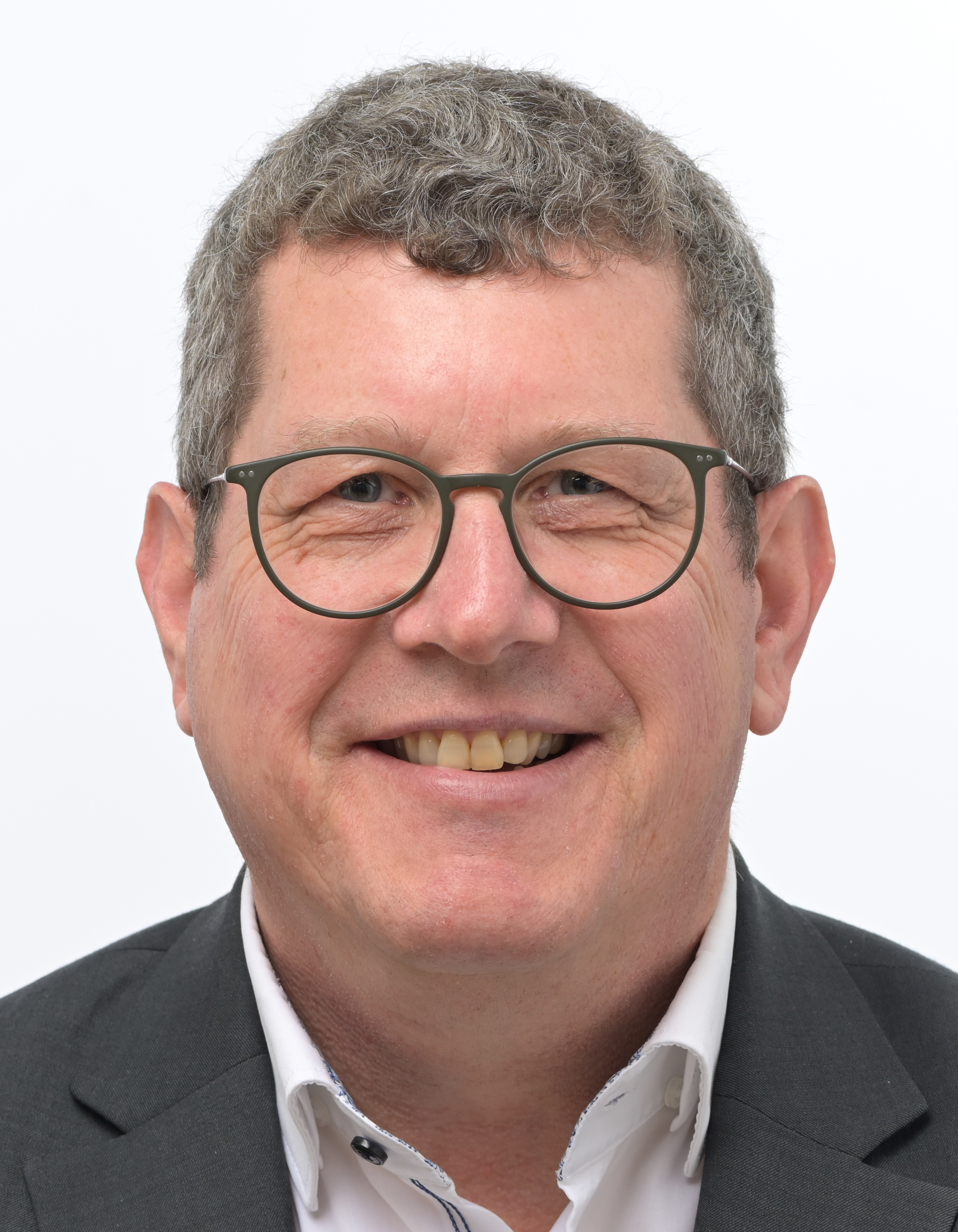
- Köhler in 2024

Member of the European Parliament for Germany
- Incumbent
- Assumed office 16 July 2024

Personal details
- Born: 24 September 1967 (age 58)
- Party: Christian Social Union
- Other political affiliations: European People's Party

Stefan Heinz Andreas Köhler (born 24 September 1967) is a German politician of the Christian Social Union who was elected member of the European Parliament in 2024. He has served as president of the Deutscher Bauernverband in Lower Franconia since 2017.
