= Veronika Vrecionová =

Czech politician (born 1965)

Veronika Vrecionová MEP
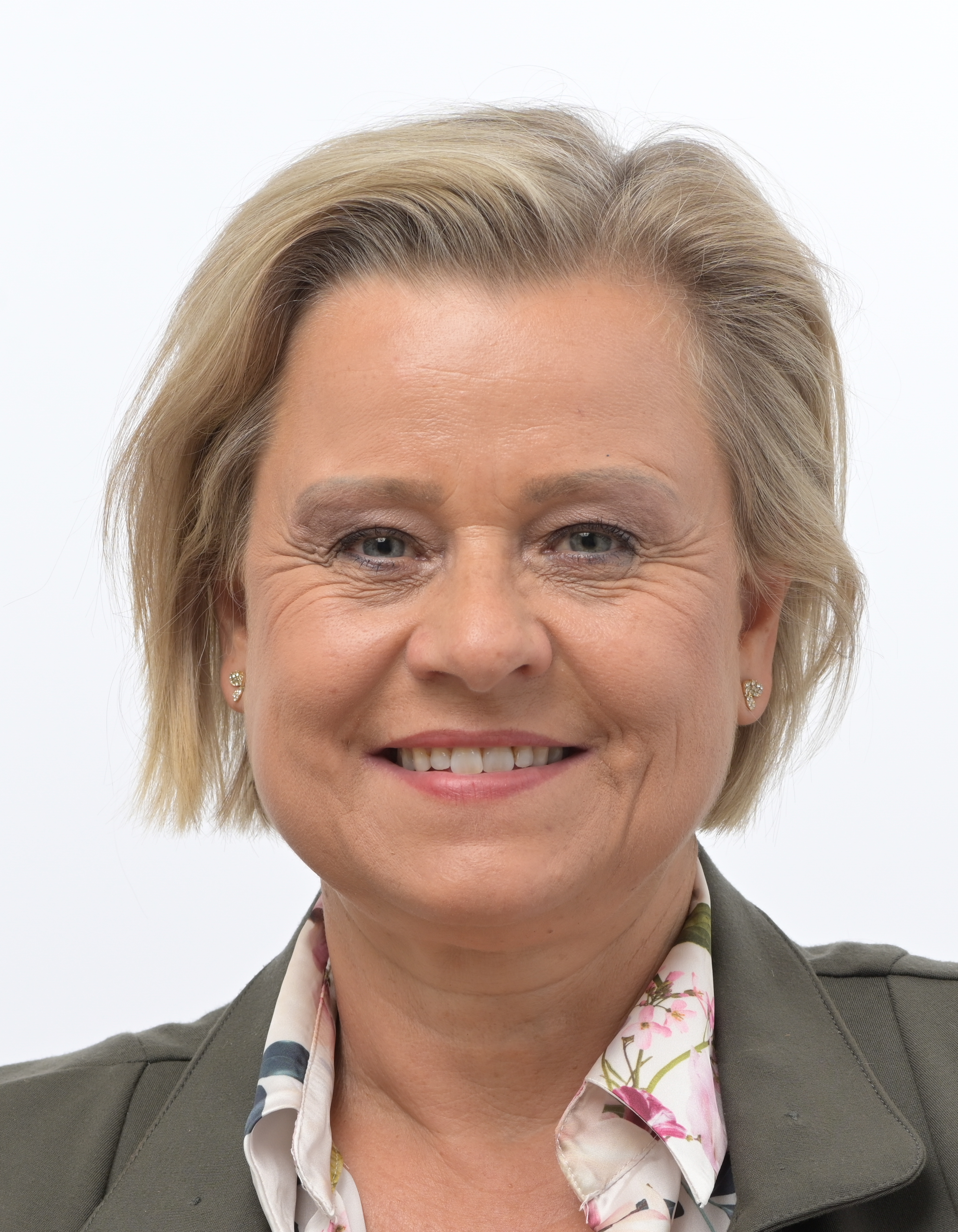
- Official portrait, 2024

Member of the European Parliament for Czech Republic
- Incumbent
- Assumed office 2 July 2019

Personal details
- Born: 8 September 1965 (age 61) České Budějovice, Czechoslovakia
- Party: Civic Democratic Party
- Children: 2
- Education: University of Economics, Prague

Veronika Vrecionová (born 8 September 1965) is a Czech politician has served as a Member of the European Parliament since 2019. A member of the Civic Democratic Party, she currently serves as chairwoman of the EU Parliament's Committee on Agriculture and Rural Development.

Vrecionová told the European Parliament Committee on Agriculture and Rural Development in 2024 that she had three dogs and seven cats.
