= Esther Herranz García =

Spanish politician

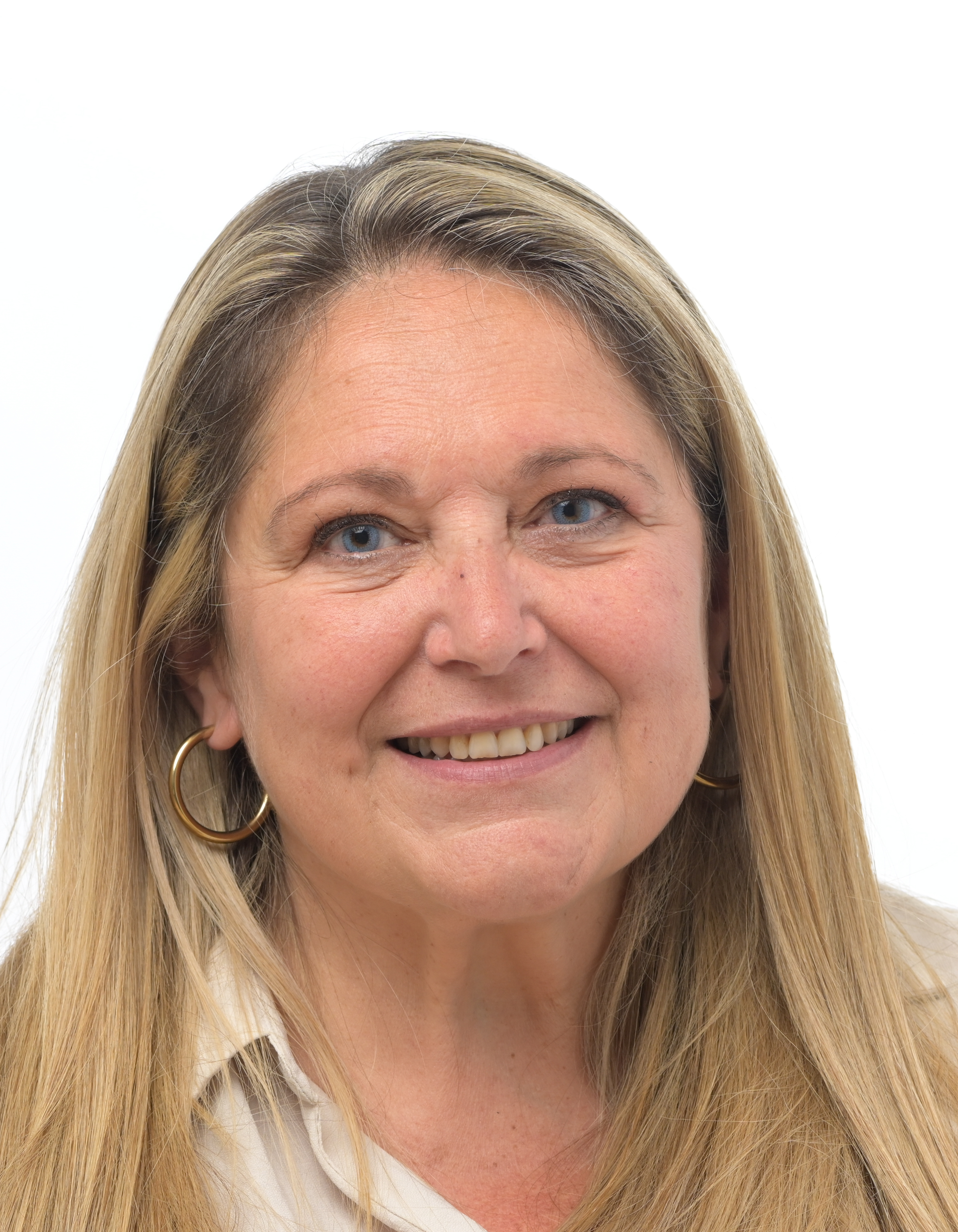
- Esther Herranz García, 2024

María Esther Herranz García (Spanish pronunciation: [esˈteɾ eˈranθ ɣaɾˈθi.a]; born 3 July 1969 in Logroño) is a Spanish politician. Esther serves as a Member of the European Parliament with the People's Party, part of the European People's Party, from 2002 to 2019 and again in 2024.

During her time in parliament, Herranz García served on the European Parliament's Committee on Agriculture and Rural Development and its Committee on Women's Rights and Gender Equality. She was also a substitute for the Committee on the Environment, Public Health and Food Safety, substitute for the Delegation to the EU-Chile Joint Parliamentary Committee.

== Education ==
- 1993: Degree in geography (University of Saragossa), specialising in physical geography
- 1994: Master's degree in regional planning and the environment (University of Valencia
- 1998: Master's degree in waste management
- Postgraduate degree in environmental management (School of Industrial Organisation)

== Career ==
- 1997-1999: Environmental consultant
- 1996-2000: Chairwoman of the Environment Committee of the La Rioja branch of the PP
- since 1999: Member of the Executive Committee of the La Rioja branch of the PP
- 1999: Chairwoman of the External Activities Committee of the La Rioja branch of the PP
- since 2002: Member of the National Executive Committee of the PP
- 1999-2002: Adviser within the office of the President of the La Rioja Autonomous Community
- 2002-2019, 2024: Member of the European Parliament

== See also ==
- 2004 European Parliament election in Spain
- 2024 European Parliament election in Spain
