= Emma Rafowicz =

French politician (born 1995)

Emma Rafowicz MEP
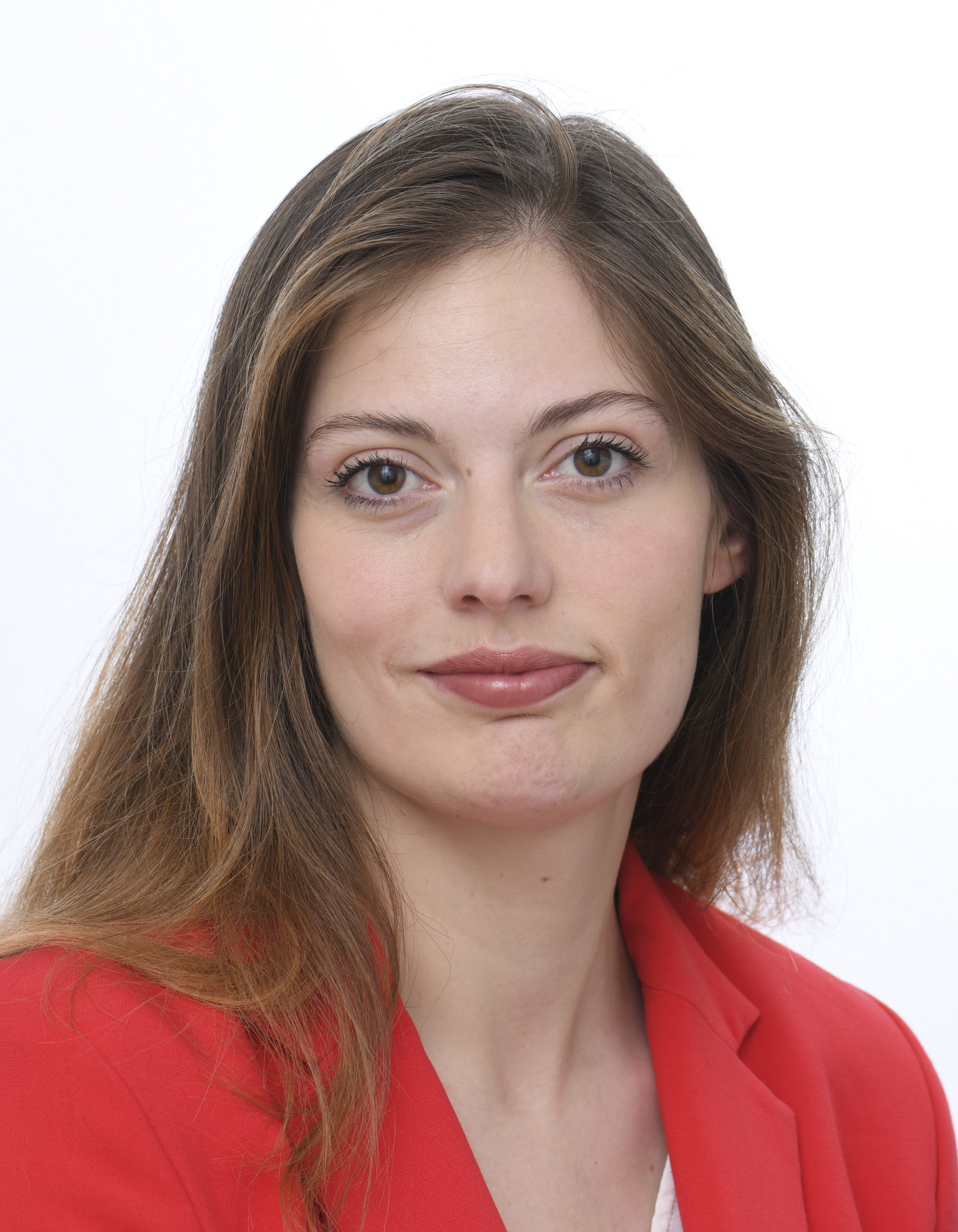
- Rafowicz in 2024

Member of the European Parliament for France
- Incumbent
- Assumed office 16 July 2024

President of the Young Socialist Movement
- Incumbent
- Assumed office October 2021

Personal details
- Born: 24 June 1995 (age 31)
- Party: Socialist Party (since 2011)
- Other political affiliations: Party of European Socialists
- Education: CELSA (Paris-Sorbonne University)

Emma Rafowicz (born 24 June 1995) is a French politician of the Socialist Party (PS). She was elected member of the European Parliament in 2024. She is currently serving as president of the Young Socialist Movement and municipal councillor of the 11th arrondissement of Paris, after having served as Deputy mayor from 2020 to 2024.

== Early life and career ==
She was born in Paris.

She first became involved in politics at the age of 15, and joined the Socialist Party in 2011, following the 2010 pension reforms.
