= Giuseppe Lupo =

Italian politician (born 1966)

Giuseppe Lupo MEP
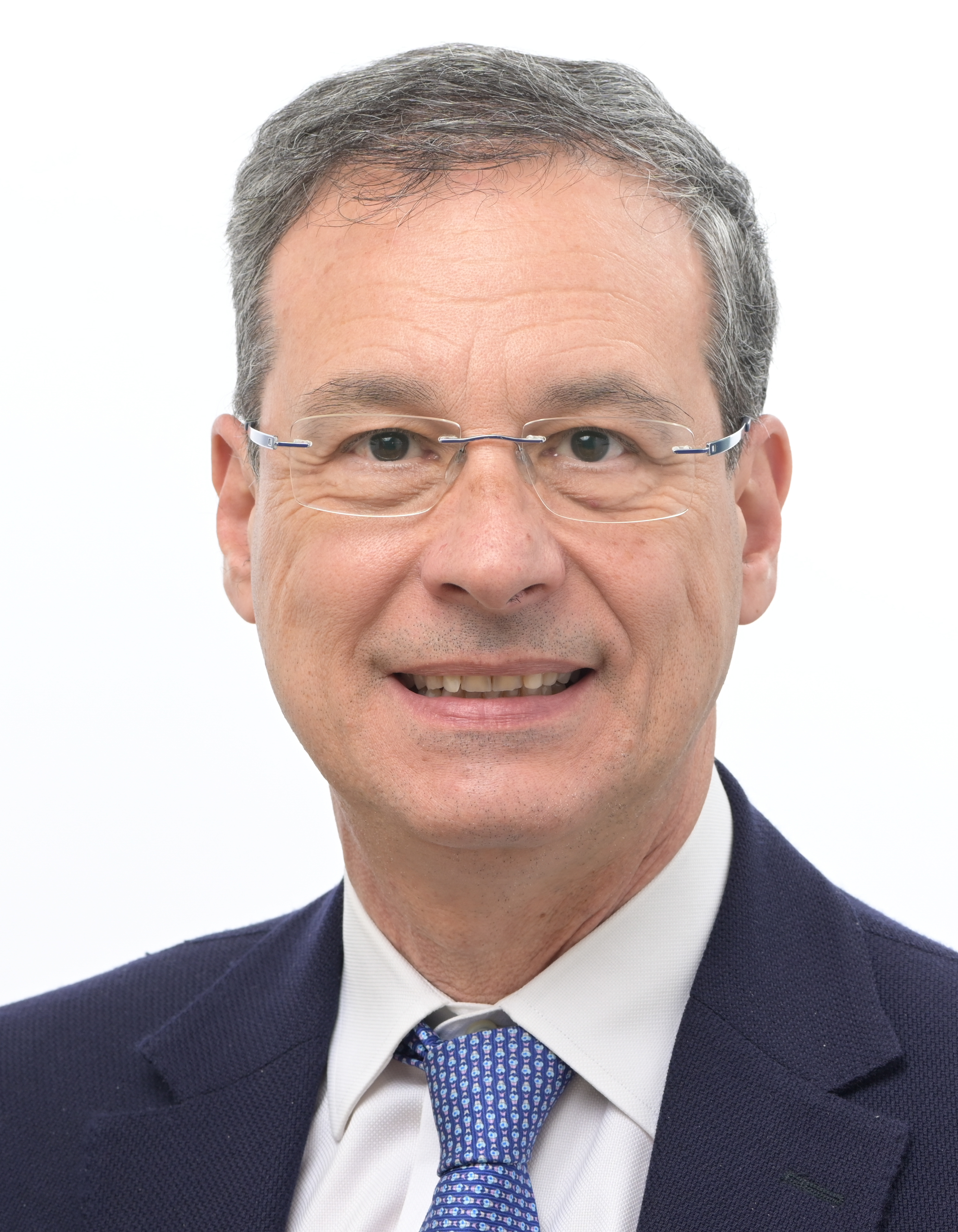
- Lupo in 2024

Member of the European Parliament for Italian Islands
- Incumbent
- Assumed office 16 July 2024

Personal details
- Born: 18 March 1966 (age 60)
- Party: Democratic Party
- Other political affiliations: Party of European Socialists

Giuseppe Lupo (born 18 March 1966) is an Italian politician of the Democratic Party who was elected member of the European Parliament in 2024. He served in the Sicilian Regional Assembly from 2008 to 2022.
