= Daniel Buda =

Romanian politician

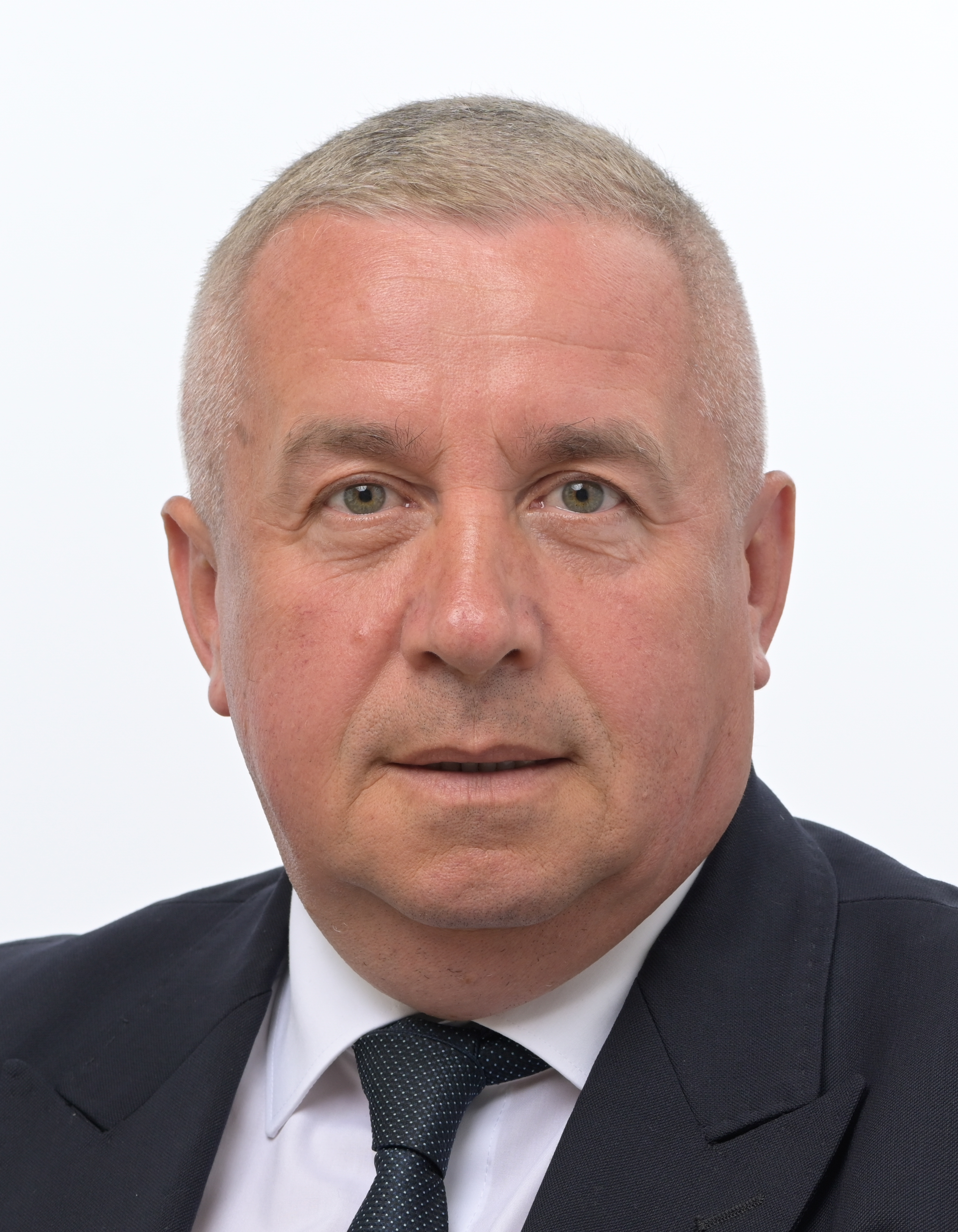
Portrait of Buda in EPP Congress, Madrid

Daniel Buda MEP (born 11 January 1970) is a Romanian politician. He has been a member of the European Parliament since 2014. He is a member of the PDL (Democratic Liberal Party), which was merged into the PNL in 2014. In the 2019 election, he ran as a member of the PNL, again becoming an MEP. He is affiliated with the EPP group.

== Political career ==
In parliament, Buda has been serving on the Committee on Agriculture and Rural Development (since 2019) and the Committee on Regional Development (2015–2019, again since 2024). From 2014 to 2019, he was also a member of the Committee on Legal Affairs.

As part of his committee work, Buda has been the parliament’s rapporteur on the transportation of animals.

In addition to his committee assignments, he is part of the parliament’s delegations to the OACPS-EU Joint Parliamentary Assembly, to the Pacific-EU Parliamentary Assembly and to the EU-Türkiye Joint Parliamentary Committee.
