= Giuseppe Milazzo =

Italian politician

Giuseppe Milazzo MEP
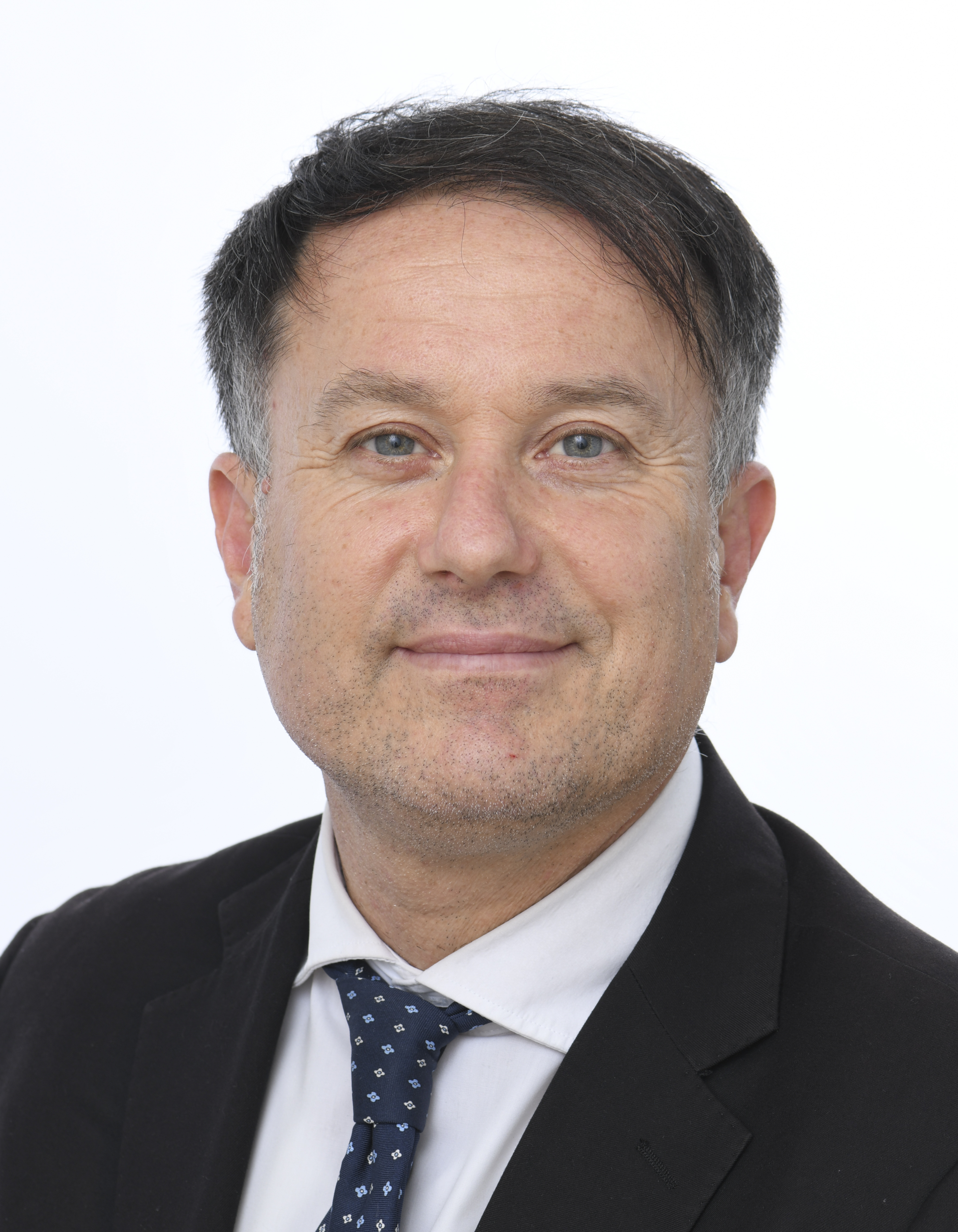

Member of the European Parliament for Italian Islands
- Incumbent
- Assumed office 2 July 2019

Personal details
- Party: Forza Italia (2013-2021); Brothers of Italy (2021-present)
- Other political affiliations: European People's Party Group (2019–2021); European Conservatives and Reformists (2021–present)

Giuseppe Milazzo (born 21 August 1977 in Palermo) is an Italian politician who was elected as a member of the European Parliament in 2019.

Member of the Sicilian Regional Assembly from 2013 to 2019.
