= Gabriella Gerzsenyi =

Hungarian politician (born 1977)

Gabriella Gerzsenyi MEP
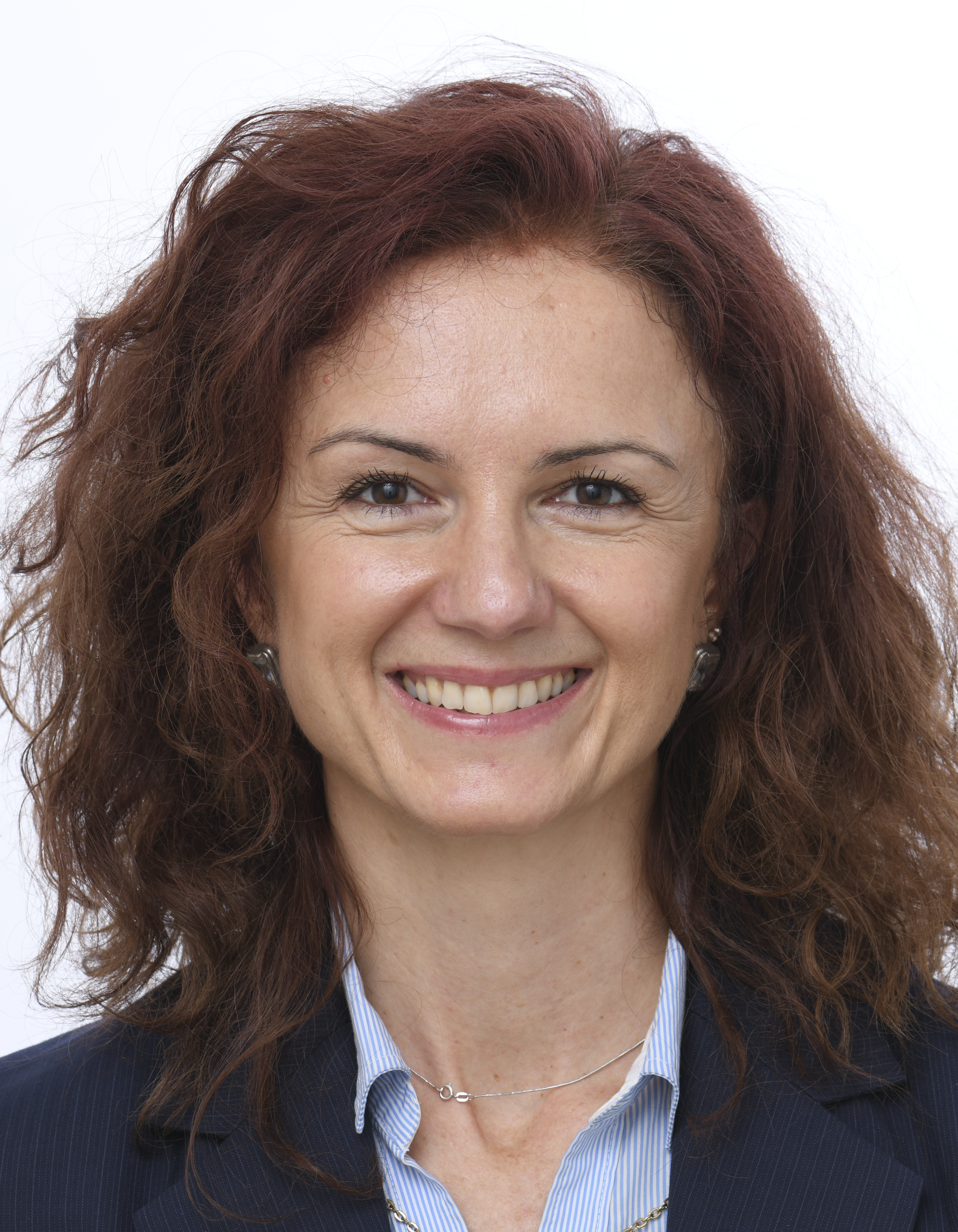
- Official portrait, 2024

Member of the European Parliament
- Incumbent
- Assumed office 16 July 2024
- Constituency: Hungary

Personal details
- Born: 30 October 1977 (age 48) Berehove, Ukrainian SSR, Soviet Union
- Citizenship: Hungary
- Party: Tisza
- Other political affiliations: European People's Party
- Children: 2
- Education: ELTE Faculty of Law; KU Leuven
- Occupation: Lawyer; politician

Gabriella Gerzsenyi (born 30 October 1977) is a Hungarian politician of the Tisza Party who was elected member of the European Parliament in 2024. She worked for the European Commission from 2005 to 2021.
