= EuroLat =

Parliamentary assembly

- Map of the EU (green) and Latin America (orange)
- Formation: 2006
- Type: Inter-parliamentary institution
- Headquarters: Brussels, Belgium
- Website: http://www.europarl.europa.eu/intcoop/eurolat/default_en.htm

EuroLat, the Euro–Latin American Parliamentary Assembly, is a trans-national body of 150 Parliamentarians from Europe and Latin America. It was established in 2006 to bolster EU-Latin American relations. It was described by Benita Ferrero-Waldner, the European Union's External Relations Commissioner, as "one of the key bodies in ensuring fruitful cooperation between our two regions".

== Organisation ==
EuroLat is led by a Co-Presidency, the current European Co-President is Ramón Jáuregui Atondo and the Latin American Co-President is José Leonel Vasquéz Búcaro (of El Salvador, Parlacen). There are 14 Co-Vice Presidents, again equally split. The Co-Presidents and the Co-Vice Presidents form the Executive Bureau, the managing body. EuroLat has four standing committees: Political, Security and Human Rights Affairs; Economic, Financial and Trade Affairs; Committee on Social Affairs, Youth and Children, Human Exchanges, Education and Culture and Committee on Sustainable Development, Environment, Energy Policy, Research, Innovation and Technology. There can be a maximum of 2 temporary committees or working groups.

== Members ==
The 150 members are split equally between European and Latin American members, currently drawn from the following bodies;

- European Parliament
- Andean Parliament
- Central American Parliament
- Latin American Parliament
- Parliament of Mercosur
- Congress of Mexico
- National Congress of Chile

Executive Bureau Members from European Parliament;

- Chair: Javi López (S&D, Spain)
- 1st Vice Chair: Jordi Cañas Pérez (RE, Spain)
- 2nd Vice Chair: Sandra Pereira (GUE/NGL, Portugal)
- 3rd Vice Chair: Hermann Tertsch (ECR, Spain)
- 4th Vice Chair: José Manuel García-Margallo (EPP, Spain)
- 5th Vice Chair: Nikos Androulakis (S&D, Greece)
- 6th Vice Chair: Herbert Dorfmann (EPP, Italy)
- 7th Vice Chair: Beata Mazurek (ECR, Poland)

Executive Bureau Members from Latin America;

- José Manuel Vásquez Búcaro (Parlacen, El Salvador)
- Elías Ariel Castillo Gonzalez (Parlatino, Panamá)
- Jorge Pizarro Soto (JPC Eu-Chile)
- Rabindranath Salazar Solorio (JPC EU-Mexico)
- María de los Angeles Higonet (Parlatino, Argentina)
- Doreen Javier Ibarra (Parlasur, Uruguay)
- José Pedro de la Cruz (Parlandino, Ecuador)
- Diego Aquino Acosta Rojas (Parlacen, Dominican Republic)

== See also ==
- European Union, Latin America and the Caribbean Summit
- Euronest Parliamentary Assembly
- ACP–EU Joint Parliamentary Assembly
