= Eric Sargiacomo =

French politician (born 1969)

Eric Sargiacomo MEP
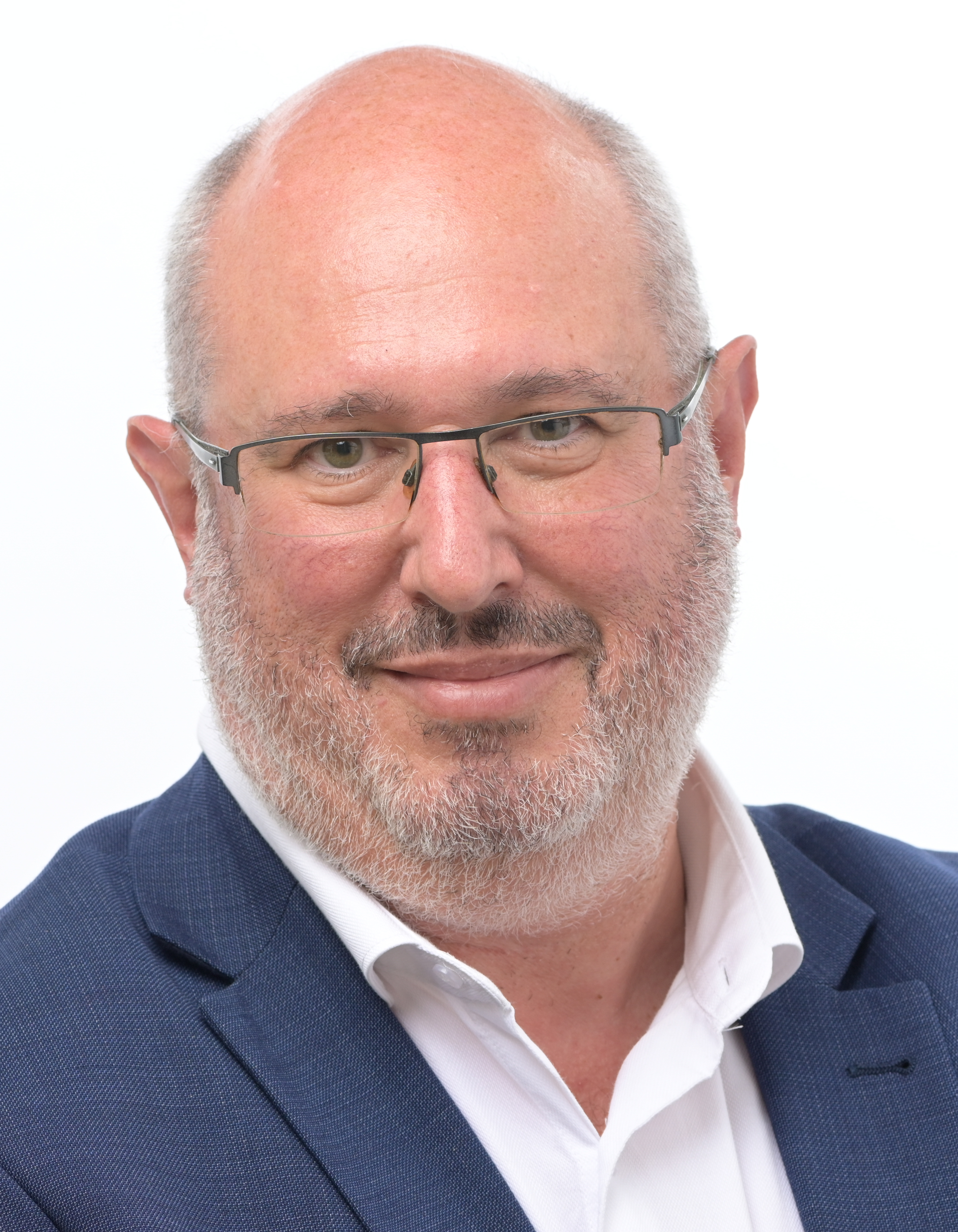
- Sargiacomo in 2024

Member of the European Parliament for France
- Incumbent
- Assumed office 16 July 2024

Personal details
- Born: 31 October 1969 (age 57)
- Party: Socialist Party
- Other political affiliations: Party of European Socialists

Eric Sargiacomo (born 31 October 1969) is a French politician of the Socialist Party who was elected member of the European Parliament in 2024. He has served in the Regional Council of Nouvelle-Aquitaine since 2021.
