= Norbert Lins =

German politician (born 1977)

Norbert Lins MEP
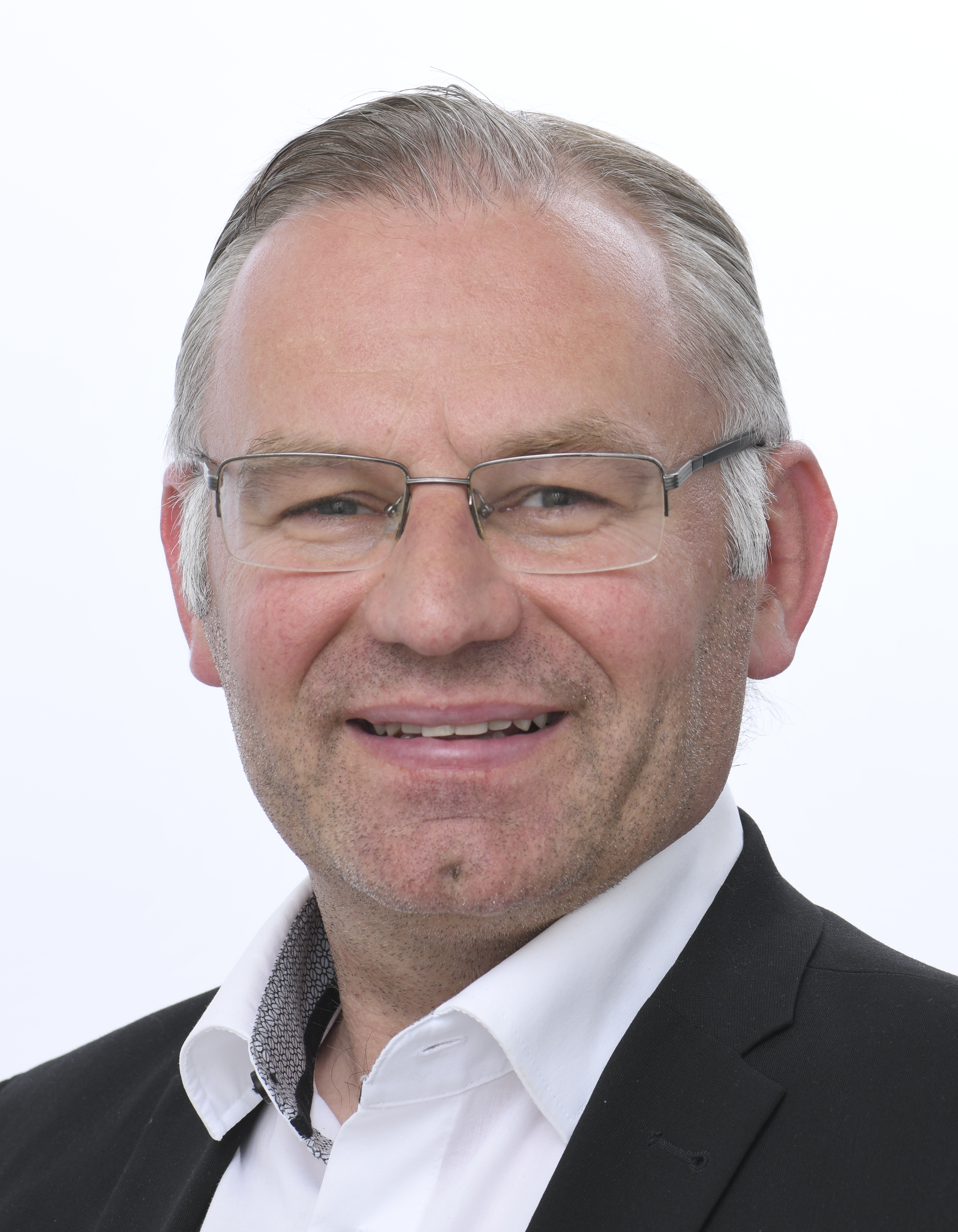

Member of the European Parliament
- Incumbent
- Assumed office 1 July 2014
- Constituency: Germany

Personal details
- Born: 22 December 1977 (age 48) Ravensburg, Baden-Württemberg, West Germany (present-day Germany)
- Party: German; Christian Democratic Union; EU; European People's Party
- Website: www.norbert-lins.de

Norbert Lins (born 22 December 1977) is a German politician who has served as a Member of the European Parliament (MEP) since 2014. Since 2019, he has chaired the Committee on Agriculture and Rural Development. He is a member of the Christian Democratic Union (CDU), part of the European People's Party (EPP).

== Education and profession ==
He graduated from High School of Economics in Ravensburg in 1997. He then did his military service with the German Armed Forces in Sigmaringen. From 1998 to 2002, he studied at the University of Applied Sciences in Kehl as a candidate for the higher civil service. He then completed a master's degree in "European Public Management" at the University of Applied Sciences in Ludwigsburg and Kehl.

From 2004 to 2009, Norbert Lins worked as head of office to Andreas Schwab at the European Parliament in Brussels. From 2006 to 2011, he was a lecturer at Kehl University of Applied Sciences. After another administrative station, he became personal assistant to Rudolf Köberle in the Ministry of Rural Areas and Consumer Protection Baden-Württemberg. From 2013, he held the Division for Broadband Funding in the Ministry of Rural Affairs and Consumer Protection of the Federal State of Baden-Württemberg.

== Party ==
Norbert Lins was active in local politics in the Young Christian Democrats and the CDU. From 2005 to 2011, he was chairman of the Württemberg-Hohenzollern Young Christian Democrats. From 2009 to 2011, he was a local councillor in the municipal council of Horgenzell. Since 2011, Norbert Lins has been vize-chairman of the CDU Württemberg-Hohenzollern and since 2013 a member of the executive board of the CDU Baden-Württemberg.

== Political career ==
Lins has been a Member of the European Parliament since the 2014 European elections. He first served on the Committee on the Environment, Public Health and Food Safety. Since 2017, he has been a member of the Committee on Agriculture and Rural Development; he became its chairman in 2019. He was also a member of the Special Committee on the Union’s authorisation procedure for pesticides; in 2018, he served as rapporteur for the Special Committee on the EU Pesticide Approval Process, along with Congressman Bart Staes.

In addition to his committee assignments, Lins is a member of the Parliament's delegation for relations with Switzerland and Norway and to the EU-Iceland Joint Parliamentary Committee and the European Economic Area (EEA) Joint Parliamentary Committee. He is also a substitute member of the Committee on the Environment, Public Health and Food Safety, the Delegation to the EU-Mexico Joint Parliamentary Committee and the Delegation to the Euro-Latin American Parliamentary Assembly.

Lins also supports the European Parliament Intergroup on Climate Change, Biodiversity and Sustainable Development and the European Parliament Intergroup on the Welfare and Conservation of Animals.

== Political positions ==
Ahead of the Christian Democrats’ leadership election in 2018, Lins publicly endorsed Friedrich Merz to succeed Angela Merkel as the party’s chair.
