= European Parliament Committee on Public Health =

European Parliament committee

Committee on Public Health
- Abbreviation: SANT
- Type: Standing committee
- Legislature: European Parliament
- Parliamentary term: 10th European Parliament
- Chair: Adam Jarubas; EPP, Poland
- Vice-Chairs: Tilly Metz (Greens/EFA); Stine Bosse (Renew); Romana Jerković (S&D); Emmanouil Fragkos (ECR)
- Members: 43
- Political composition: EPP: 11 · S&D: 8 · ECR: 5 · Renew: 5 · PfE: 5 · Greens/EFA: 3 · The Left: 3 · ESN: 1 · NI: 2
- Established: 2024
- Jurisdiction: Public health, pharmaceutical and cosmetic products, medical preparedness, health threats and EU health agencies
- Website: Official website

The Committee on Public Health (SANT) is a standing committee of the European Parliament. It is responsible for public-health policy, pharmaceutical and cosmetic products, health preparedness and responses to cross-border health threats, as well as parliamentary scrutiny of the European Medicines Agency and the European Centre for Disease Prevention and Control.

The body was originally created in 2023 as the Subcommittee on Public Health under the Committee on the Environment, Public Health and Food Safety. It later became a separate standing committee during the tenth parliamentary term in 2024, while retaining the abbreviation SANT.

== Responsibilities ==
The committee is responsible for programmes and specific measures in the field of public health, pharmaceutical and cosmetic products, health aspects of bioterrorism and relations with the principal EU agencies responsible for medicines and disease prevention.

Its work includes:

- EU programmes and actions in the field of public health;
- pharmaceutical legislation and access to medicines;
- medical devices and health technologies;
- preparedness for and response to cross-border health threats;
- disease prevention, vaccination policy and antimicrobial resistance;
- mental health and the prevention of non-communicable diseases;
- health aspects of bioterrorism;
- the European Medicines Agency; and
- the European Centre for Disease Prevention and Control.

The committee holds exchanges of views with EU agencies, health ministers, researchers and other stakeholders. Its recent work has included medical-device legislation, digital health, youth mental health, biotechnology, cardiovascular disease and oversight of the European Medicines Agency.

== History ==
The Subcommittee on Public Health was created in March 2023 in response to the increased political importance of EU health policy after the COVID-19 pandemic. Its creation followed the work of temporary bodies such as the Special Committee on Beating Cancer and the Special Committee on the COVID-19 pandemic. In the tenth parliamentary term, public-health responsibilities were separated from the environment committee and assigned to SANT as an independent standing committee.

== Chairs ==
Name	Political group	Member state	Took office	Left office
Adam Jarubas	EPP	Poland	2024	Incumbent

== Members ==
=== 10th Parliament, 2024–2029 ===
The committee currently has 43 full members. Its current composition is shown below, with the chair and vice-chairs indicated in italics.

European People's Party	Progressive Alliance of Socialists and Democrats	European Conservatives and Reformists	Renew Europe
Adam Jarubas, Poland, Chair; Bartosz Arłukowicz, Poland; Michalis Hatzipantelas, Cyprus; András Tivadar Kulja, Hungary; Marie-Sophie Lanig, Germany; Peter Liese, Germany; Letizia Moratti, Italy; Elena Nevado del Campo, Spain; Jessica Polfjärd, Sweden; Oliver Schenk, Germany; Tomislav Sokol, Croatia	Romana Jerković, Croatia, Vice-Chair; Vytenis Povilas Andriukaitis, Lithuania; Christophe Clergeau, France; Nicolás González Casares, Spain; Alessandra Moretti, Italy; Victor Negrescu, Romania; Nikos Papandreou, Greece; Tiemo Wölken, Germany	Emmanouil Fragkos, Greece, Vice-Chair; Waldemar Buda, Poland; Michele Picaro, Italy; Ruggero Razza, Italy; Laurence Trochu, France	Stine Bosse, Denmark, Vice-Chair; Olivier Chastel, Belgium; Veronika Cifrová Ostrihoňová, Slovakia; Jérémy Decerle, France; Vlad Voiculescu, Romania
Patriots for Europe	Greens–European Free Alliance	The Left	Europe of Sovereign Nations
Laurent Castillo, France; Viktória Ferenc, Hungary; Gerald Hauser, Austria; Ondřej Knotek, Czechia; Margarita de la Pisa Carrión, Spain	Tilly Metz, Luxembourg, Vice-Chair; Martin Häusling, Germany; Ignazio Marino, Italy	Catarina Martins, Portugal; Valentina Palmisano, Italy; Dario Tamburrano, Italy	Christine Anderson, Germany
Non-Inscrits			
Monika Beňová, Slovakia; Ondřej Dostál, Czechia			

==== Substitute members ====
Substitute members of the 10th Parliament (click “show” to expand)

The committee's substitute members are listed below.

European People's Party	Progressive Alliance of Socialists and Democrats	European Conservatives and Reformists	Renew Europe
Peter Agius, Malta; Niels Flemming Hansen, Denmark; Sérgio Humberto, Portugal; Radan Kanev, Bulgaria; Ewa Kopacz, Poland; Dolors Montserrat, Spain; Dan-Ştefan Motreanu, Romania; Sirpa Pietikäinen, Finland; Manuela Ripa, Germany; Liesbet Sommen, Belgium; Ingeborg ter Laak, Netherlands	Estelle Ceulemans, Belgium; Pierre Jouvet, France; Leire Pajín, Spain; Günther Sidl, Austria; Marta Temido, Portugal; Raffaele Topo, Italy; Kristian Vigenin, Bulgaria	Carlo Ciccioli, Italy; Pietro Fiocchi, Italy; Ondřej Krutílek, Czechia; Kristoffer Storm, Denmark; Aurelijus Veryga, Lithuania	Andreas Glück, Germany; Irena Joveva, Slovenia; Billy Kelleher, Ireland; Yvan Verougstraete, Belgium
Patriots for Europe	Greens–European Free Alliance	The Left	Europe of Sovereign Nations
Marie-Luce Brasier-Clain, France; Valérie Deloge, France; Ton Diepeveen, Netherlands; Aleksandar Nikolic, France; Aldo Patriciello, Italy	Majdouline Sbaï, France; Nicolae Ștefănuță, Romania; Marie Toussaint, France	Sebastian Everding, Germany; Giorgos Georgiou, Cyprus; Anja Hazekamp, Netherlands	Ivan David, Czechia
Non-Inscrits			
Kateřina Konečná, Czechia; Friedrich Pürner, Germany			

== Research support ==
The committee's work is supported by the European Parliament's research services, which provide studies and briefings on pharmaceutical policy, disease prevention, public-health preparedness, digital health, mental health and health-system resilience.

== See also ==
- Health policy of the European Union
- Healthcare in Europe
- European Medicines Agency
- European Centre for Disease Prevention and Control
- European Health Data Space
- Directorate-General for Health and Food Safety
- European Parliament Committee on the Environment, Climate and Food Safety
