= European Parliament Committee on the Environment, Climate and Food Safety =

European Parliament committee

Committee on the Environment, Climate and Food Safety
- Abbreviation: ENVI
- Type: Standing committee
- Legislature: European Parliament
- Parliamentary term: 10th European Parliament
- Chair: Pierfrancesco Maran; S&D, Italy
- Vice-Chairs: Esther Herranz García (EPP); Pietro Fiocchi (ECR); Anja Hazekamp (The Left); András Tivadar Kulja (EPP)
- Members: 90
- Political composition: EPP: 24 · S&D: 17 · ECR: 10 · Renew: 10; PfE: 11 · Greens/EFA: 7 · The Left: 6 · ESN: 3 · NI: 2
- Jurisdiction: Environmental and climate policy, pollution, chemicals, biodiversity, circular economy and food safety
- Website: Official website

The Committee on the Environment, Climate and Food Safety (ENVI) is a standing committee of the European Parliament. It is responsible for environmental and climate policy, pollution prevention, chemicals, waste and the circular economy, biodiversity, civil protection and food safety. Public health responsibilities previously exercised by ENVI were transferred to the new Committee on Public Health during the tenth parliamentary term.

== Responsibilities ==
The committee is responsible for environmental policy and environmental-protection measures, including climate change, air, soil and water pollution, waste management and recycling, dangerous substances, noise, biodiversity and the restoration of environmental damage.

Its remit includes:

- climate policy and implementation of the European Green Deal;
- air, soil and water quality and measures against pollution;
- waste prevention, waste management, recycling and the circular economy;
- chemicals, pesticides and other dangerous substances;
- nature restoration, biodiversity and protection of natural resources;
- sustainable development and international environmental agreements;
- civil protection and responses to environmental disasters;
- the European Environment Agency and the European Chemicals Agency;
- the safety and labelling of foodstuffs and food-production systems; and
- the European Food Safety Authority.

The committee scrutinises the implementation of environmental legislation and follows major policy initiatives concerning climate neutrality, industrial decarbonisation, air and water quality, biodiversity, chemicals, pesticides and food safety. Parliament's official committee page describes ENVI as one of its two largest committees, with 90 members.

== Evolution ==
The committee's importance increased substantially as the European Parliament acquired greater legislative powers in environmental and health policy. The extension of the ordinary legislative procedure to these areas made ENVI one of Parliament's principal legislative committees. Environmental legislation, climate policy and food-safety regulation have consequently formed a major part of its workload.

Until 2025, the committee was formally named the Committee on the Environment, Public Health and Food Safety. Following the creation of a separate standing Committee on Public Health, its current name and remit place greater emphasis on climate and environmental legislation while retaining responsibility for food safety.

== Chairs ==
The following table lists the chairs of the committee since 1979.

Name	Political group	Member state	Took office	Left office
Ken Collins	Socialist Group	United Kingdom	1979	1984
Beate Weber	Socialist Group	Germany	1984	1989
Ken Collins	Socialist Group	United Kingdom	1989	1999
Caroline Jackson	EPP–ED	United Kingdom	1999	2004
Karl-Heinz Florenz	EPP–ED	Germany	2004	2007
Miroslav Ouzký	UEN	(Czech Republic) Czechia	2007	2009
Jo Leinen	S&D	Germany	2009	2012
Matthias Groote	S&D	Germany	2012	2014
Giovanni La Via	EPP	Italy	2014	2019
Pascal Canfin	Renew Europe	France	2019	2024
Antonio Decaro	S&D	Italy	2024	2026
Pierfrancesco Maran	S&D	Italy	2026	Incumbent

== Members ==
=== 10th Parliament, 2024–2029 ===
The committee currently consists of 90 full members. Its current composition is shown below, with the chair and vice-chairs indicated in italics.

European People's Party	Progressive Alliance of Socialists and Democrats	European Conservatives and Reformists	Renew Europe
Esther Herranz García, Spain, Vice-Chair; András Tivadar Kulja, Hungary, Vice-Chair; Pascal Arimont, Belgium; Bartosz Arłukowicz, Poland; Alexander Bernhuber, Austria; Ioan-Rareș Bogdan, Romania; Zala Tomašič, Slovenia; Hanna Gronkiewicz-Waltz, Poland; Niels Flemming Hansen, Denmark; Radan Kanev, Bulgaria; Stefan Köhler, Germany; Ewa Kopacz, Poland; Peter Liese, Germany; Elżbieta Katarzyna Łukacijewska, Poland; Dolors Montserrat, Spain; Letizia Moratti, Italy; Jessica Polfjärd, Sweden; Massimiliano Salini, Italy; Oliver Schenk, Germany; Susana Solís Pérez, Spain; Ingeborg ter Laak, Netherlands; Flavio Tosi, Italy; Dimitris Tsiodras, Greece; Andrea Wechsler, Germany	Pierfrancesco Maran, Italy, Chair; Vytenis Povilas Andriukaitis, Lithuania; Sakis Arnaoutoglou, Greece; Thomas Bajada, Malta; Delara Burkhardt, Germany; Mohammed Chahim, Netherlands; Christophe Clergeau, France; Annalisa Corrado, Italy; Heléne Fritzon, Sweden; Romana Jerković, Croatia; Javi López, Spain; César Luena, Spain; Alessandra Moretti, Italy; Günther Sidl, Austria; Marta Temido, Portugal; Kristian Vigenin, Bulgaria; Tiemo Wölken, Germany	Pietro Fiocchi, Italy, Vice-Chair; Sergio Berlato, Italy; Emmanouil Fragkos, Greece; Jacek Ozdoba, Poland; Michele Picaro, Italy; Nicola Procaccini, Italy; Beatrice Timgren, Sweden; Aurelijus Veryga, Lithuania; Alexandr Vondra, Czechia; Anna Zalewska, Poland	Grégory Allione, France; Stine Bosse, Denmark; Pascal Canfin, France; Gerben-Jan Gerbrandy, Netherlands; Andreas Glück, Germany; Martin Hojsík, Slovakia; Katri Kulmuni, Finland; Ana Vasconcelos, Portugal; Emma Wiesner, Sweden; Michal Wiezik, Slovakia
Patriots for Europe	Greens–European Free Alliance	The Left	Europe of Sovereign Nations
Mathilde Androuët, France; Barbara Bonte, Belgium; Marie-Luce Brasier-Clain, France; Jorge Buxadé Villalba, Spain; Viktória Ferenc, Hungary; Anne-Sophie Frigout, France; Roman Haider, Austria; Ondřej Knotek, Czechia; Jana Nagyová, Czechia; Silvia Sardone, Italy; Antonín Staněk, Czechia	Pär Holmgren, Sweden; Ignazio Marino, Italy; Tilly Metz, Luxembourg; Rasmus Nordqvist, Denmark; Jutta Paulus, Germany; Majdouline Sbaï, France; Lena Schilling, Austria	Anja Hazekamp, Netherlands, Vice-Chair; Lynn Boylan, Ireland; Emma Fourreau, France; Martin Günther, Germany; Catarina Martins, Portugal; Jonas Sjöstedt, Sweden	Anja Arndt, Germany; Ivan David, Czechia; Marc Jongen, Germany
Non-Inscrits			
Ondřej Dostál, Czechia; Fernand Kartheiser, Luxembourg			

==== Substitute members ====
Substitute members of the 10th Parliament (click “show” to expand)

The committee's substitute members are listed below.

European People's Party	Progressive Alliance of Socialists and Democrats	European Conservatives and Reformists	Renew Europe
François-Xavier Bellamy, France; Hildegard Bentele, Germany; Daniel Buda, Romania; Carmen Crespo Díaz, Spain; Dóra Dávid, Hungary; Raúl de la Hoz Quintano, Spain; Jens Gieseke, Germany; Sunčana Glavak, Croatia; Michalis Hatzipantelas, Cyprus; Sérgio Humberto, Portugal; Adam Jarubas, Poland; Seán Kelly, Ireland; Martine Kemp, Luxembourg; Norbert Lins, Germany; Danuše Nerudová, Czechia; Lídia Pereira, Portugal; Sirpa Pietikäinen, Finland; Virgil-Daniel Popescu, Romania; Dennis Radtke, Germany; Manuela Ripa, Germany; Tomislav Sokol, Croatia; Liesbet Sommen, Belgium	Biljana Borzan, Croatia; Estelle Ceulemans, Belgium; Nikolas Farantouris, Greece; André Franqueira Rodrigues, Portugal; Nicolás González Casares, Spain; Pierre Jouvet, France; Dan Nica, Romania; Maria Noichl, Germany; Leire Pajín, Spain; Thomas Pellerin-Carlin, France; Matteo Ricci, Italy; Chloé Ridel, France; Elena Sancho Murillo, Spain; Christel Schaldemose, Denmark; Irene Tinagli, Italy; Bruno Tobback, Belgium; Raffaele Topo, Italy	Galato Alexandraki, Greece; Adrian-George Axinia, Romania; Stefano Cavedagna, Italy; Paolo Inselvini, Italy; Nora Junco García, Spain; Antonella Sberna, Italy; Sander Smit, Netherlands; Claudiu-Richard Târziu, Romania; Laurence Trochu, France; Jadwiga Wiśniewska, Poland	Jeannette Baljeu, Netherlands; Olivier Chastel, Belgium; Sigrid Friis, Denmark; Karin Karlsbro, Sweden; Billy Kelleher, Ireland; Ilhan Kyuchyuk, Bulgaria; Christine Singer, Germany; Anna Stürgkh, Austria; Vlad Voiculescu, Romania; Yvan Verougstraete, Belgium
Patriots for Europe	Greens–European Free Alliance	The Left	Europe of Sovereign Nations
Mireia Borrás Pabón, Spain; Susanna Ceccardi, Italy; Valérie Deloge, France; Ton Diepeveen, Netherlands; Gerald Hauser, Austria; György Hölvényi, Hungary; Aldo Patriciello, Italy; Margarita de la Pisa Carrión, Spain; Matthieu Valet, France	Michael Bloss, Germany; Martin Häusling, Germany; Ufuk Kâhya, Netherlands; Sara Matthieu, Belgium; Maria Ohisalo, Finland; Kai Tegethoff, Germany; Marie Toussaint, France	Li Andersson, Finland; Per Clausen, Denmark; Sebastian Everding, Germany; Giorgos Georgiou, Cyprus; Valentina Palmisano, Italy	Sarah Knafo, France; Volker Schnurrbusch, Germany
Non-Inscrits			
Kateřina Konečná, Czechia; Friedrich Pürner, Germany			

== Research support ==
The committee's work is supported by the research services of the European Parliament. These services provide studies, impact assessments, briefings and other analyses concerning climate policy, environmental legislation, biodiversity, chemicals, waste, the circular economy and food safety.

Publications prepared for the committee are made available through its online database of supporting analyses and through the European Parliament's Think Tank.

== See also ==
- European Green Deal
- European Climate Change Programme
- Environmental policy of the European Union
- European Environment Agency
- European Chemicals Agency
- European Food Safety Authority
- European Parliament Committee on Public Health
- Environment Council
- Directorate-General for Environment
- Directorate-General for Climate Action
- Directorate-General for Health and Food Safety
