= Ingeborg Gräßle =

German politician of the Christian Democratic Union (born 1961)

Ingeborg Gräßle MdB
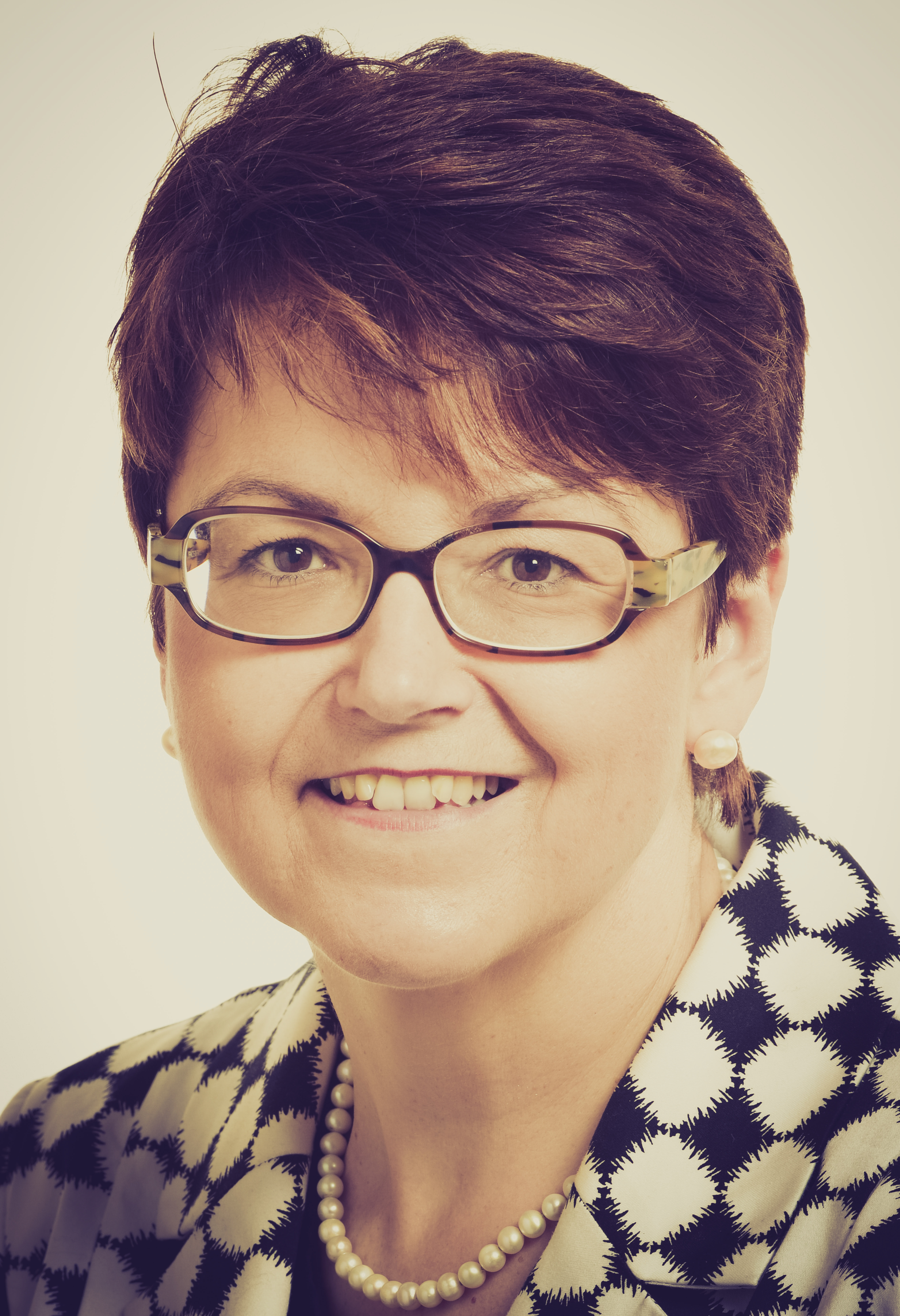

Member of the Bundestag; for Backnang – Schwäbisch Gmünd
- Incumbent
- Assumed office 26 October 2021
- Preceded by: Norbert Barthle

Chair of the European Parliament Budgetary Control Committee
- In office 7 July 2014 – 2019
- Preceded by: Jan Mulder
- Succeeded by: Monika Hohlmeier

Member of the European Parliament
- In office 13 June 2004 – 2019
- Constituency: Germany

Personal details
- Born: Ingeborg Helen Gräßle; 2 March 1961 (age 65) Heidenheim, West Germany
- Party: German: Christian Democratic Union; EU: European People's Party
- Education: University of Stuttgart; Institut d'études politiques de Paris; Free University of Berlin
- Website: Official website

Ingeborg Helen Gräßle (born 2 March 1961) is a German politician of the Christian Democratic Union (CDU) who has been serving as a member of the German Bundestag since the 2021 elections, representing the Backnang – Schwäbisch Gmünd district. She previously served as a Member of the European Parliament (MEP) from 2004 until 2019, where chaired of the Budgetary Control Committee.

As the co-rapporteur for the revision of the financial regulation, approved in the plenary in October 2012, Gräßle was instrumental in the negotiation of a compromise between the European Institutions. Gräßle is well known within the EU as a strong proponent of increased transparency and accountability for the Institutions.

== Early life and education ==
Gräßle was born in 1961 in the town of Großkuchen, located in the Heidenheim district of Baden-Württemberg, Germany, where she attended elementary school until 1971. She attended high school at Hellenstein-Gymnasium Heidenheim until 1980, after which she completed a two-year internship with Augsburger Allgemeine, where she subsequently worked as an editor from 1982 to 1984.

After leaving editorial work in 1984, Gräßle enrolled at the University of Stuttgart, where she earned a master's degree in romance languages, history, and political science in 1989. She spent a year studying at the Institut d'études politiques in Paris, France, and in 1990, she took a job as the Director of Public Relations for Konrad-Adenauer-Haus (the German national headquarters for the Christian Democratic Union) in Bonn, Germany.

In 1994 Gräßle earned her PhD in political science from the Free University of Berlin. Her dissertation, the "Der europäische Fernseh-Kulturkanal ARTE : deutsch-französische Medienpolitik zwischen europäischem Anspruch und nationaler Wirklichkeit", examined the Franco-German television network, ARTE and explored the relationship between European standards and national realities.

== Political career ==
=== Beginnings ===
From 1995 to 1996, Gräßle was the spokeswoman for Rüsselsheim am Main, the largest town in the Groß-Gerau district of the Rhein-Main region. In 1996 Gräßle was elected to the State Parliament of Baden-Württemberg where she served until 2004, when she was elected to the European Parliament.

Since 1999, Gräßle has served as the Vice-Chair of the CDU Women's Union of Baden-Württemberg, a member of the Heidenheim District Council, and a member of the CDU Bureau in Baden-Württemberg. In 2001 she was appointed as the Deputy District Chair of the CDU in Northern Baden-Württemberg and the District Chair of the CDU in Heidenheim.

Gräßle was a CDU delegate to the Federal Convention for the purpose of electing the President of Germany in May 2004.

=== Member of the European Parliament, 2004–2019 ===
Gräßle was elected to the European Parliament and began her first term on 20 August 2004. She was re-elected in 2009 and 2014.

Gräßle acted as the co-rapporteur, along with Crescenzio Rivellini, and lead parliamentary negotiator on legislation which created a new set of rules that govern the implementation of EU funds, known commonly as the financial regulation; the European Parliament acted as co-legislator with the European Commission for the first time while drafting the new financial regulation that entered into force in January 2013.

2004

- Member of the Committee on Budgets
- Member of the Committee on Budgetary Control

2007

- Chief Whip of the CDU/CSU Delegation in the European Parliament
- Coordinator of the EPP group in the Committee on Budgetary Control

2009

- Substitute Member of the Delegation to the Euro-Mediterranean Parliamentary Assembly
- Substitute Member of the Committee on Employment and Social Affairs
- Substitute Member of the Delegation for Relations with Albania, Bosnia and Herzegovina, Serbia, Montenegro and Kosovo

2014

- Chairperson of the Committee on Budgetary Control
- Member of the Conference of Committee Chairs
- Member of the Committee on Budgets
- Member of the Delegation for relations with the People's Republic of China
- Substitute Member of the Committee on Employment and Social Affairs

During her time on the Committee on Budgetary Control, Gräßle led fact-finding missions to Hungary in 2011 and 2017 to visit multiple controversial EU-funded projects.

Before the 2019 election, Gräßle was listed as number 5 on the local election list by the CDU Baden-Würtemberg. This fifth place made her the first woman on the list. The local CDU could only win four seats, and so all were taken by men. In an interview, she spoke of an "old boys" network in the party with no interest in change. In the same interview, she also criticized the fact that there were no MEPs for the CDU of immigrant background.

Gräßle was not re-elected in the 2019 elections.

=== Member of the German Parliament, 2021–present ===
In September 2020, Gräßle announced that she would run for a parliamentary seat in the 2021 national elections.

Following her election to the German Bundestag in 2021, Gräßle served on the Committee on Education, Research and Technology Assessment (2021–2025), the Audit Committee (2021–2026) and the Budget Committee (2025–2026). On the Budget Committee, she served as her parliamentary group’s rapporteur on the annual budget of the Federal Ministry for Economic Cooperation and Development.

In the negotiations to form a coalition government under the leadership of Minister-President of Baden-Württemberg Winfried Kretschmann following the 2021 state elections, Gräßle was a member of the working group on public finances, co-chaired by Edith Sitzmann and Stefanie Bürkle.

In addition to her committee assignments, Gräßle has been a member of the German delegation to the Parliamentary Assembly of the Council of Europe (PACE) since 2025. In the Assembly, she serves on the Committee on Social Affairs, Health, and Sustainable Development and its Sub-Committee on the European Social Charter.

Since 2026, Gräßle has been serving as deputy chair of the CDU/CSU parliamentary group, under the leadership of chairman Thorsten Frei. In this capacity, she oversees the group's legislative activity on research, digitization, and state modernization.

== Other activities ==
- GIZ, Member of the Supervisory Board (since 2025)

== Political positions ==
Ahead of the Christian Democrats' leadership election in 2018, Gräßle publicly endorsed Annegret Kramp-Karrenbauer to succeed Angela Merkel as the party's chair.

== Controversy ==
In December 2017, the European Parliament’s Committee on Legal Affairs decided to waive Gräßle's immunity after she caused a car accident in which a person suffered a shoulder injury.

== Recognition ==
- 2013 – Taxpayers Prize of the Tax Payers' Association of Europe (jointly with Michel Barnier)
