= Fragkos =

Fragkos is a surname. Notable people with the surname include:

- Emmanouil Fragkos, Greek politician
- Michail Fragkos (born 1990), Greek footballer
