= European Parliament Committee on Budgets =

European Parliament committee

Committee on Budgets
- BUDG
- Type: Standing committee
- Legislature: European Parliament
- Parliamentary term: 10th European Parliament
- Chair: Johan Van Overtveldt; ECR, Belgium
- Vice-chairs: Monika Hohlmeier (EPP); Giuseppe Lupo (S&D); Janusz Lewandowski (EPP); Lucia Yar (Renew)
- Members: 40
- Political-group composition: EPP: 10 · S&D: 8 · PfE: 6 ECR: 4 · Renew: 4 · Greens/EFA: 3 The Left: 3 · ESN: 1 · NI: 1
- Jurisdiction: The Budget of the European Union, the Multiannual Financial Framework and the European Union's financial resources
- Website: Official website

The Committee on Budgets (BUDG) is a standing committee of the European Parliament. It is responsible for Parliament's work on the European Union budget, the Multiannual Financial Framework and the Union's system of financial resources.

== Responsibilities ==
The committee prepares Parliament's position on the annual budget of the European Union and on the Multiannual Financial Framework, which sets the limits and broad priorities for EU expenditure over a period of several years. It also examines proposals concerning the Union's own resources and other financial measures connected with the implementation of EU policies.

Its remit includes:

- the revenue and expenditure of the European Union and the annual budgetary procedure;
- the Multiannual Financial Framework;
- the Union's system of own resources;
- the financial implications of legislative proposals and other measures adopted by the European Parliament;
- transfers of appropriations and other decisions concerning the implementation of the budget;
- the budgets and financial arrangements of EU institutions and bodies, except where responsibility lies with another committee; and
- relations with the other institutions involved in the EU budgetary process.

The committee works closely with the Council of the European Union and the European Commission during the annual budgetary procedure. Parliament and the Council jointly determine the annual budget, within the ceilings established by the Multiannual Financial Framework.

== Chairs ==
The following table lists the chairs of the committee since 2014.

Name	Political group	Member state	Took office	Left office
Jean Arthuis	ALDE	France	7 July 2014	1 July 2019
Johan Van Overtveldt	ECR	Belgium	July 2019	Incumbent

== Members ==
=== 10th Parliament, 2024–2029 ===
The committee consists of 40 full members. Its current composition is shown below, with the chair and vice-chairs indicated in italics.

European People's Party	Progressive Alliance of Socialists and Democrats	European Conservatives and Reformists	Renew Europe
Monika Hohlmeier, Germany, Vice-Chair; Janusz Lewandowski, Poland, Vice-Chair; Georgios Aftias, Greece; Isabel Benjumea, Spain; Andrzej Halicki, Poland; Siegfried Mureșan, Romania; Fernando Navarrete Rojas, Spain; Danuše Nerudová, Czechia; Karlo Ressler, Croatia; Hélder Sousa Silva, Portugal	Giuseppe Lupo, Italy, Vice-Chair; Matthias Ecke, Germany; Nikolas Farantouris, Greece; Jean-Marc Germain, France; Sandra Gómez López, Spain; Victor Negrescu, Romania; Carla Tavares, Portugal; Nils Ušakovs, Latvia	Johan Van Overtveldt, Belgium, Chair; Tobiasz Bocheński, Poland; Ruggero Razza, Italy; Bogdan Rzońca, Poland	Lucia Yar, Slovakia, Vice-Chair; Olivier Chastel, Belgium; Fabienne Keller, France; Joachim Streit, Germany
Patriots for Europe	Greens–European Free Alliance	The Left	Europe of Sovereign Nations
Tomasz Buczek, Poland; Tamás Deutsch, Hungary; Angéline Furet, France; Jana Nagyová, Czechia; Julien Sanchez, France; Auke Zijlstra, Netherlands	Rasmus Andresen, Germany; Ignazio Marino, Italy; Nicolae Ștefănuță, Romania	João Oliveira, Portugal; Younous Omarjee, France; Jussi Saramo, Finland	Alexander Jungbluth, Germany
Non-Inscrits			
Thomas Geisel, Germany			

==== Substitute members ====
Substitute members of the 10th Parliament (click “show” to expand)

The committee's substitute members are listed below.

European People's Party	Progressive Alliance of Socialists and Democrats	European Conservatives and Reformists	Renew Europe
Pablo Arias Echeverría, Spain; Nina Carberry, Ireland; Christian Ehler, Germany; Michalis Hadjipantela, Cyprus; Niclas Herbst, Germany; Céline Imart, France; Kinga Kollár, Hungary; Jacek Protas, Poland; Jüri Ratas, Estonia; Aura Salla, Finland	Mohammed Chahim, Netherlands; Adnan Dibrani, Sweden; Jonás Fernández, Spain; Matjaž Nemec, Slovenia; Raffaele Topo, Italy	Dick Erixon, Sweden; Michele Picaro, Italy; Beata Szydło, Poland; Roberts Zīle, Latvia	Stine Bosse, Denmark; Valérie Hayer, France; Moritz Körner, Germany; Anouk Van Brug, Netherlands
Patriots for Europe	Greens–European Free Alliance	The Left	Europe of Sovereign Nations
Roman Haider, Austria; Gerald Hauser, Austria; Jaroslava Pokorná Jermanová, Czechia; Annamária Vicsek, Hungary	Damian Boeselager, Germany; Rasmus Nordqvist, Denmark; Kai Tegethoff, Germany	Rima Hassan, France; Elena Kountoura, Greece	Stanisław Tyszka, Poland

== Research support ==
The committee's work is supported by the research services of the European Parliament. These services provide studies, briefings and other analyses concerning the annual budgetary procedure, the Multiannual Financial Framework, the Union's own resources and the financial implications of EU policies.

Publications prepared for the committee are made available through its online database of supporting analyses and through the European Parliament's Think Tank. The database is updated as new studies and briefings are published.

== See also ==
- Budget of the European Union
- Multiannual Financial Framework
- European Parliament Committee on Budgetary Control
- Economic and Financial Affairs Council
- European Commissioner for Budget, Anti-Fraud and Public Administration
