= Committee on the Budget =

Committee on the Budget can refer to:

- United States House Committee on the Budget
- United States Senate Committee on the Budget
- Committee on Budgetary Control (European Parliament)
