= Matthias Groote =

German politician of the Social Democratic Party of Germany (born 1973)

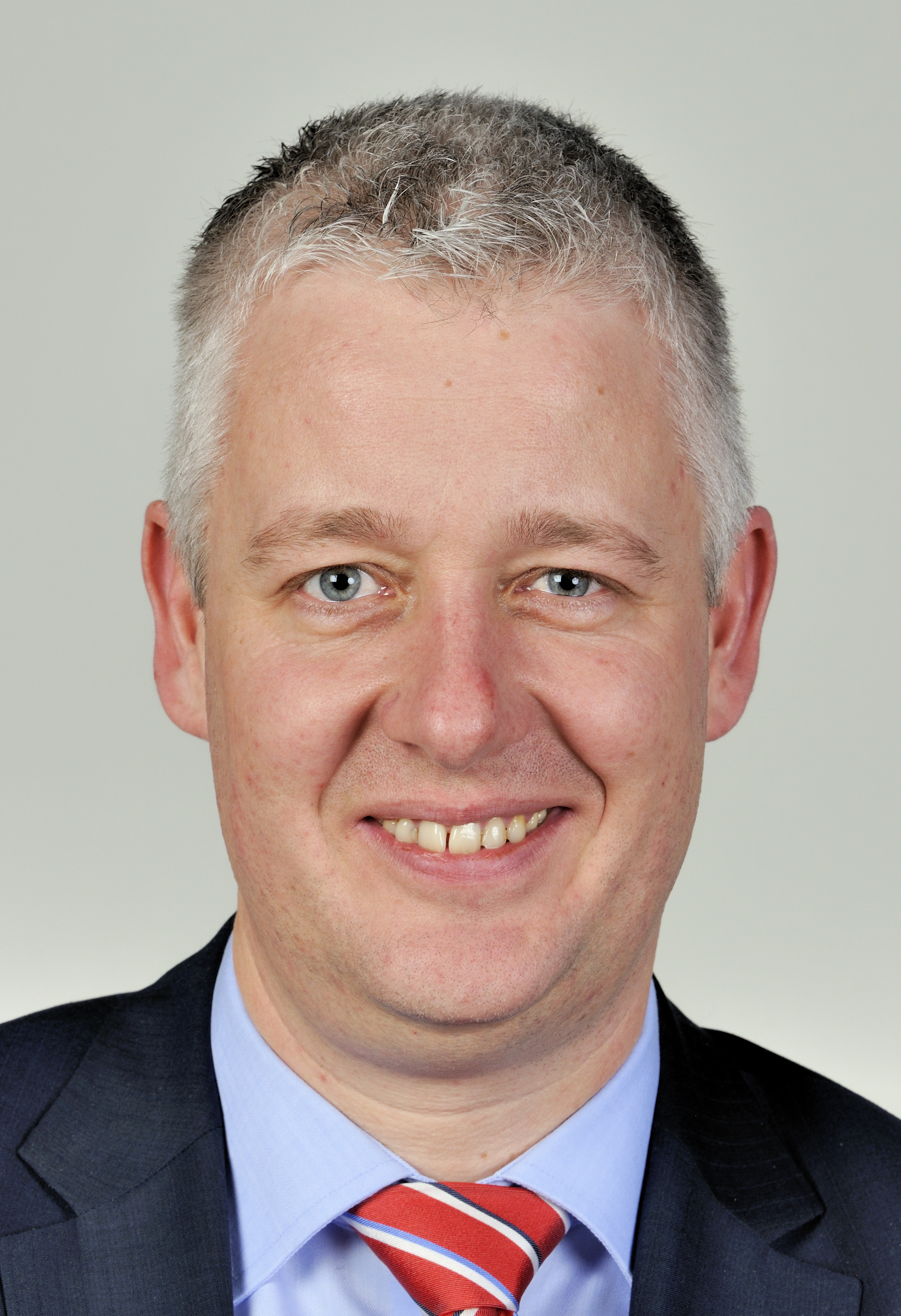

Member of the European Parliament for Germany
- In office 2005–2016
- Preceded by: Garrelt Duin
- Succeeded by: Tiemo Wölken

Personal details
- Born: 21 October 1973 (age 52) Leer, West Germany
- Party: German: Social Democratic Party; EU: Party of European Socialists

Matthias Groote (born 21 October 1973) is a German politician of the Social Democratic Party of Germany. From 2005 until 2016, he served as Member of the European Parliament and was a part of the Socialist Group in the European Parliament.

Matthias Groote life and education== Groote was born in Leer, Lower Saxony Leer and went to secondary school in Westrhauderfehn, taking the leaving exam in 1990. He was trained as an industrial engineer at Deutsche Bahn between 1991 and 1995, where he worked on plant design. In 1995 and 1996 he completed an alternate public service with the German Red Cross. Groote trained to become a technical engineer in 1999, became a qualified industrial engineer in 2005, and also became a sales engineer in 2005.

== Political career ==
=== Role in local politics ===
Groote has been a member of the Ostrhauderfehn local council since 1996, a member of the Leer district council since 2001, and the chair of the Ostrhauderfehn SPD council group since 2001. He first became a member of the Social Democratic Party in 1996 and has been a member of the Leer SPD District Executive since 1997. He was chair of the Leer District Young Socialists from 1997 to 2002, vice-chair of the Weser-Ems District Young Socialists from 1999 to 2002, and has been a member of the Executive of the Weser-Ems Social-Democratic Association for Local Politics since 2003.

=== Member of the European Parliament, 2005–2016 ===
Groote served as a Member of the European Parliament from 2005, when he took over the seat vacated by Garrelt Duin. He has since been a member of the Committee on the Environment, Public Health and Food Safety. In this capacity, he participated in the 2007 United Nations Climate Change Conference in held in Bali; the 2008 United Nations Climate Change Conference in Poznań; the 2013 United Nations Climate Change Conference in Warsaw; and the 2015 United Nations Climate Change Conference in Paris. He also was his political group's shadow rapporteur for a 2008 report on including aviation within the European Union Emission Trading Scheme. In 2012, he replaced fellow Social Democrat Jo Leinen as chair of the committee, a position he held until 2014. From 2014, he was the coordinator of the Group of Socialists and Democrats in committee as well as the parliament's contact person for the European Medicines Agency (EMA).

In addition, Groote served as member of the Temporary Committee on Climate Change between 2007 and 2009 and of the Committee on Constitutional Affairs between 2009 and 2012. He has also been part of the parliament's delegations with Japan (2005–2009) and the United States (2009–2014).

Besides his committee assignments, Groote is a member of several cross-party groups, including the European Forum for Renewable Energy Sources (EUFORES).

In January 2016, Groote announced his intention to run for the office of Landrat in the District of Leer and to resign from the European Parliament in the case of winning the local elections. Following his election as Landrat, he left the European Parliament and was succeeded by Tiemo Wölken.

== Other activities ==
- European Medicines Agency (EMA), Member of the Management Board
- IG Metall, Member
- German Wind Energy Association (BWE), Member
- Gegen Vergessen – Für Demokratie, Member
