= European Parliament Committee on Budgetary Control =

European Parliament committee

Committee on Budgetary Control
- CONT
- Type: Standing committee
- Legislature: European Parliament
- Parliamentary term: 10th European Parliament
- Chair: Andreas Schwab; EPP, Germany
- Vice-chairs: Caterina Chinnici (EPP); Cristian Terheș (ECR); Claudiu Manda (S&D); Jacek Protas (EPP)
- Members: 30
- Political-group composition: EPP: 8 · S&D: 6 · PfE: 4 ECR: 3 · Renew: 3 · Greens/EFA: 2 The Left: 2 · ESN: 1 · NI: 1
- Jurisdiction: Scrutiny of the implementation of the EU budget, financial control and the discharge procedure
- Website: Official website

The Committee on Budgetary Control (CONT) is a standing committee of the European Parliament. It scrutinises the implementation of the European Union budget, examines the use of EU funds and prepares Parliament's decisions on whether to grant discharge to the institutions and bodies responsible for implementing the budget.

== Responsibilities ==
The committee is responsible for examining the implementation of the Union budget and the accounts and balance sheets of the European Union, its institutions and bodies. It considers whether EU funds have been managed legally, efficiently and effectively and may recommend improvements intended to strengthen financial management and accountability.

Its remit includes:

- the control of the implementation of the EU budget and of the European Development Fund;
- preparation of Parliament's decisions on the discharge procedure, including the internal discharge procedure;
- examination of the accounts and financial statements of the European Union, its institutions and EU-funded bodies;
- oversight of the cost-effectiveness of different forms of EU financing;
- consideration of fraud, corruption and other irregularities affecting the implementation of the EU budget;
- relations with the European Court of Auditors, including consideration of its reports; and
- relations with the European Anti-Fraud Office (OLAF), including the protection of the European Union's financial interests.

The discharge procedure is one of the committee's principal responsibilities. On the basis of the annual reports of the European Court of Auditors and information supplied by the institutions concerned, the committee prepares recommendations on whether Parliament should approve, postpone or refuse discharge for the implementation of a given financial year's budget.

== Chairs ==
The following table lists the chairs of the committee since 2004.

Name	Political group	Member state	Took office	Left office
Szabolcs Fazakas	PES	Hungary	2004	2006
Herbert Bösch	PES	Austria	2007	2009
Luigi de Magistris	ALDE	Italy	2009	2011
Jan Mulder	ALDE	Netherlands	2011	2014
Ingeborg Gräßle	EPP	Germany	2014	2019
Monika Hohlmeier	EPP	Germany	2019	2024
Andreas Schwab	EPP	Germany	2024	Incumbent

== Members ==
=== 10th Parliament, 2024–2029 ===
The committee consists of 30 full members. Its current composition is shown below, with the chair and vice-chairs indicated in italics.

European People's Party	Progressive Alliance of Socialists and Democrats	European Conservatives and Reformists	Renew Europe
Andreas Schwab, Germany, Chair; Caterina Chinnici, Italy, Vice-Chair; Jacek Protas, Poland, Vice-Chair; Georgios Aftias, Greece; Raúl de la Hoz Quintano, Spain; Monika Hohlmeier, Germany; Kinga Kollár, Hungary; Tomáš Zdechovský, Czechia	Claudiu Manda, Romania, Vice-Chair; José Cepeda, Spain; Giuseppe Lupo, Italy; Marit Maij, Netherlands; Csaba Molnár, Hungary; Carla Tavares, Portugal	Cristian Terheș, Romania, Vice-Chair; Joachim Brudziński, Poland; Dick Erixon, Sweden	Gilles Boyer, France; Olivier Chastel, Belgium; Gerben-Jan Gerbrandy, Netherlands
Patriots for Europe	Greens–European Free Alliance	The Left	Europe of Sovereign Nations
Tamás Deutsch, Hungary; Virginie Joron, France; Ondřej Knotek, Czechia; Julien Sanchez, France	Daniel Freund, Germany; Rasmus Nordqvist, Denmark	Jonas Sjöstedt, Sweden; Pasquale Tridico, Italy	Arno Bausemer, Germany
Non-Inscrits			
Fidias Panayiotou, Cyprus			

==== Substitute members ====
Substitute members of the 10th Parliament (click “show” to expand)

The committee's substitute members are listed below.

European People's Party	Progressive Alliance of Socialists and Democrats	European Conservatives and Reformists	Renew Europe
Paulo Cunha, Portugal; Dirk Gotink, Netherlands; Niclas Herbst, Germany; Andrey Kovatchev, Bulgaria; Janusz Lewandowski, Poland; Virgil-Daniel Popescu, Romania; Karlo Ressler, Croatia; Adrián Vázquez Lázara, Spain	Lucia Annunziata, Italy; Jens Geier, Germany; Maria Grapini, Romania; Eero Heinäluoma, Finland; Yannis Maniatis, Greece; Thomas Pellerin-Carlin, France	Carlo Fidanza, Italy; Bert-Jan Ruissen, Netherlands; Șerban Dimitrie Sturdza, Romania	Vlad Vasile-Voiculescu, Romania; Michal Wiezik, Slovakia
Patriots for Europe	Greens–European Free Alliance	The Left	Europe of Sovereign Nations
Csaba Dömötör, Hungary; Roman Haider, Austria; Annamária Vicsek, Hungary	Erik Marquardt, Germany; Terry Reintke, Germany	Younous Omarjee, France	Alexander Jungbluth, Germany
Non-Inscrits			
Grzegorz Braun, Poland			

== Research support ==
The committee's work is supported by the research services of the European Parliament. These services provide studies, briefings and other analyses concerning budgetary control, the discharge procedure, fraud prevention, financial accountability and the protection of the European Union's financial interests.

Publications prepared for the committee are made available through its online database of supporting analyses and through the European Parliament's Think Tank. The database is updated as new studies and briefings are published.

== See also ==
- Budget of the European Union
- Discharge procedure
- European Court of Auditors
- European Anti-Fraud Office
- European Public Prosecutor's Office
- European Parliament Committee on Budgets
