= Tiemo Wölken =

German lawyer and politician

Tiemo Wölken MEP
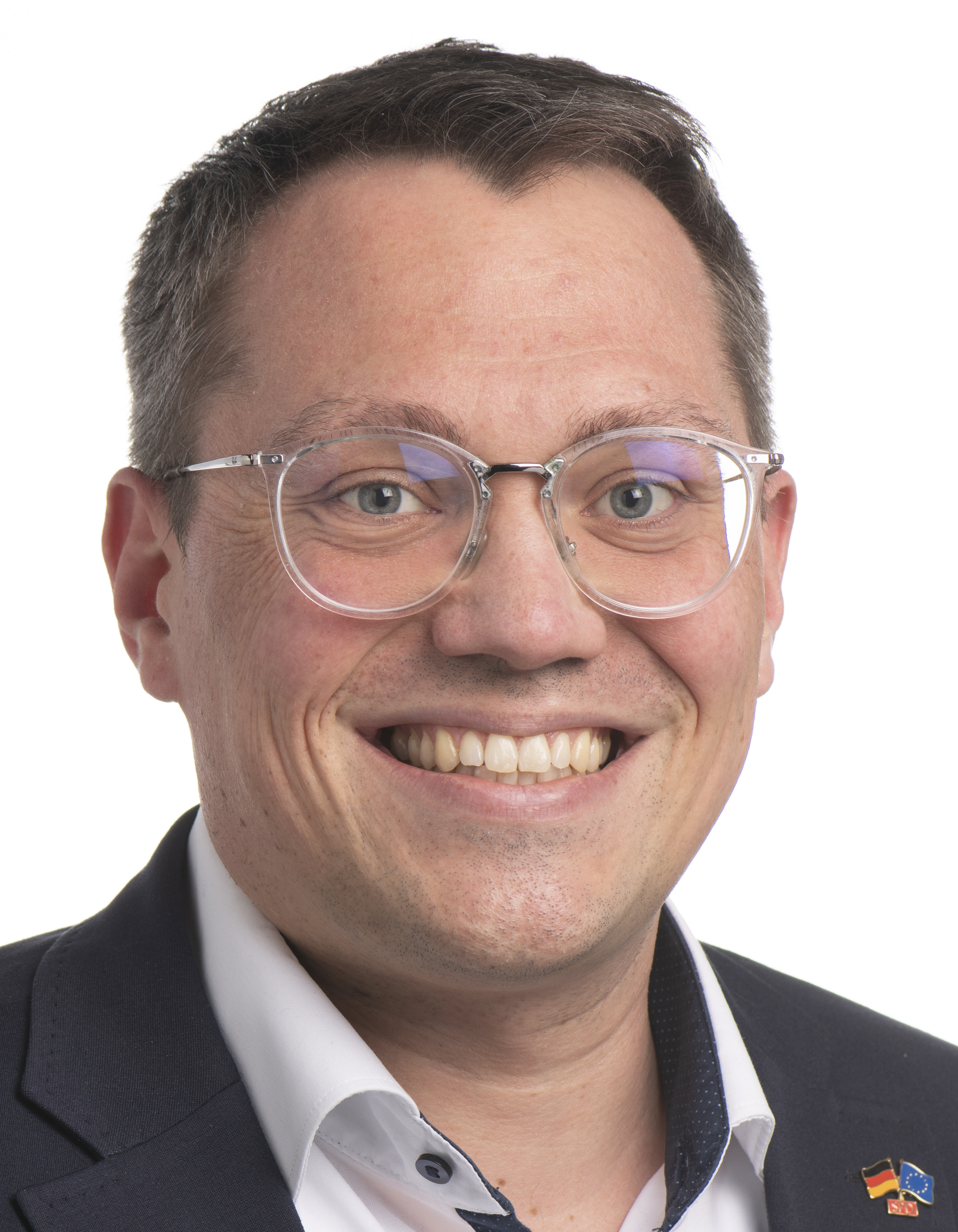

Member of the European Parliament
- Incumbent
- Assumed office 14 November 2016
- Preceded by: Matthias Groote
- Constituency: Germany

Personal details
- Born: 5 December 1985 (age 40) Otterndorf, Lower Saxony, Germany
- Party: German; Social Democratic Party; European Union; Party of European Socialists

Tiemo Wölken (born 5 December 1985) is a German lawyer and politician who has been a Member of the European Parliament (MEP) since 14 November 2016. He is a member of the Social Democratic Party, part of the Party of European Socialists. Following the 2019 European Parliament election, he joined the Committee on Legal Affairs, where he serves as his parliamentary group’s coordinator.

== Early life and education ==
Wölken was born in Ottendorf. He was educated at the Halepaghen Grammar School before studying law at the University of Osnabrück, where he specialised in European public law. He also completed a supplementary course in economics at the University of Osnabrück before completing a Master in International Law in 2013 at the University of Hull in England.

== Political career ==
Wölken became a Member of the European Parliament when he replaced Matthias Groote who resigned to run for local office in 2016. During his first term, he served on the Committee on the Environment, Public Health and Food Safety (2016–2017) and on the Committee on Budgets (2017–2019). Following the 2019 elections, he moved to the Committee on Legal Affairs, where he serves as his parliamentary group’s coordinator. He is also the Parliament’s lead rapporteur on health technology assessment. In 2021, Wölken and Roberta Metsola co-authored a resolution to protect journalists and critical voices from strategic lawsuits against public participation, which was overwhelmingly endorsed by the Parliament.

In addition to his committee assignments, Wölken has been part of the Parliament’s delegations to the Euro-Latin American Parliamentary Assembly (2016–2019), the EU-Mexico Joint Parliamentary Committee (2016–2019) and to Canada (since 2019). He co-chairs the MEP Interest Group on Antimicrobial Resistance (AMR). He is also a member of the European Parliament Intergroup on Anti-Corruption, the European Parliament Intergroup on Seas, Rivers, Islands and Coastal Areas, the European Parliament Intergroup on Artificial Intelligence and Digital, the European Internet Forum and the Responsible Business Conduct Working Group.

Wölken was nominated by his party as delegate to the Federal Convention for the purpose of electing the President of Germany in 2022.

In the negotiations to form a Grand Coalition under the leadership of Friedrich Merz's Christian Democrats (CDU together with the Bavarian CSU) and the SPD following the 2025 German elections, Wölken was part of the SPD delegation in the working group on digital policy, led by Manuel Hagel, Reinhard Brandt and Armand Zorn.

== Other activities ==
- Business Forum of the Social Democratic Party of Germany, Member of the Political Advisory Board
- Education and Science Workers' Union (GEW), Member
