= András Kulja =

Hungarian politician (born 1989)

András Kulja MEP
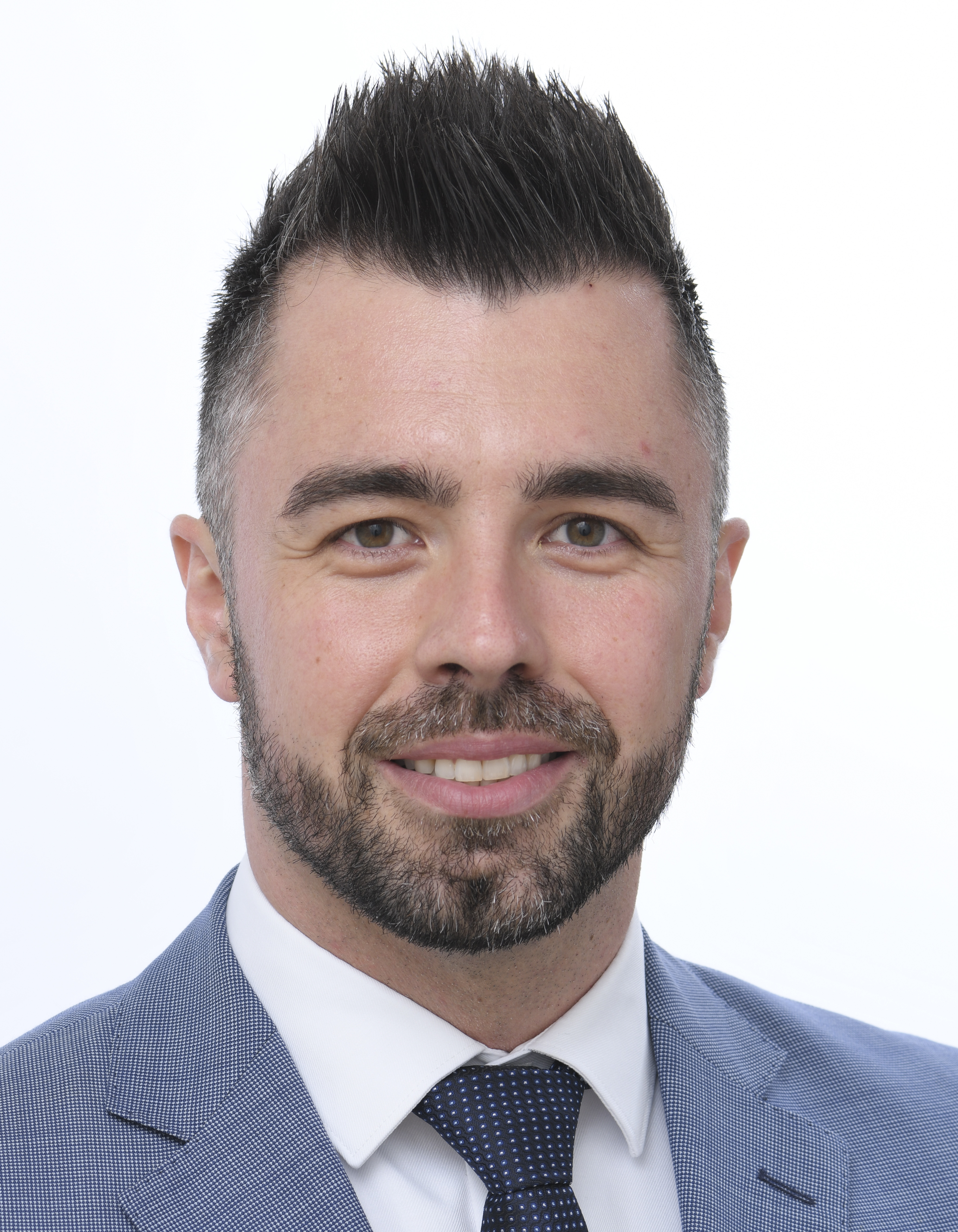
- Official portrait, 2024

Member of the European Parliament
- Incumbent
- Assumed office 16 July 2024
- Constituency: Hungary

Personal details
- Born: András Tivadar Kulja; 17 September 1989 (age 37) Nyíregyháza, Hungary
- Party: Tisza
- Other political affiliations: European People's Party
- Education: Semmelweis University

TikTok information
- Page: andras.doktor
- Followers: 377 thousand
- Last updated: 15 December 2025

András Tivadar Kulja (born 17 September 1989) is a Hungarian doctor, internet personality, and politician of the Tisza Party who was elected member of the European Parliament in 2024. He posts health education content to several platforms, the most popular of which is his TikTok account.

== Early life ==
András Kulja was born in Nyíregyháza on 17 September 1989. His mother is a psychiatrist and his father is a microbiologist. His parents are from Transcarpathia.

He studied medicine at Semmelweis University in Budapest. After graduating in 2016, he worked as a resident physician in psychiatry for one and a half years. While pursuing medical school and residency, he carried out research into depression. Later, he left the field and started his training in surgery, citing a wish for a more dynamic workflow and performing manual tasks. His decision was also shaped by his prior experience of assisting in veterinary surgeries with a veterinarian family member. He began teaching at Semmelweis University in 2022.

Aiming to share healthcare information with a wider audience, he posted his first YouTube video in 2019, and launched his TikTok account in 2021. As of June 2024, he had 368,000 followers on TikTok.

== Political career ==
On 6 April 2024, Kulja attended a demonstration in Kossuth Square organized by Péter Magyar, and became committed to the Tisza Party. Although he was scheduled to take his specialty exam in surgery in May, he postponed it and left his job as a surgical trainee in April, citing a desire to "speak openly and without retribution" about the situation in Hungarian healthcare, as well as an intention to focus on his political engagement.

He was placed fourth on Tisza's party list for the European Parliament election. On 9 June, the party won a total of seven seats, and Kulja was confirmed as a member of the European Parliament. In July, he was elected a vice-chair of the European Parliament Committee on the Environment, Public Health and Food Safety. Soon after his election as an MEP, he mentioned participation in health policy programs and improvement of health literacy among his aims.

In June 2025, Kulja was a joint winner of the Best Newcomer Award at the MEP Awards.
