= Oliver Schenk =

German politician (born 1968)

Oliver Schenk MEP
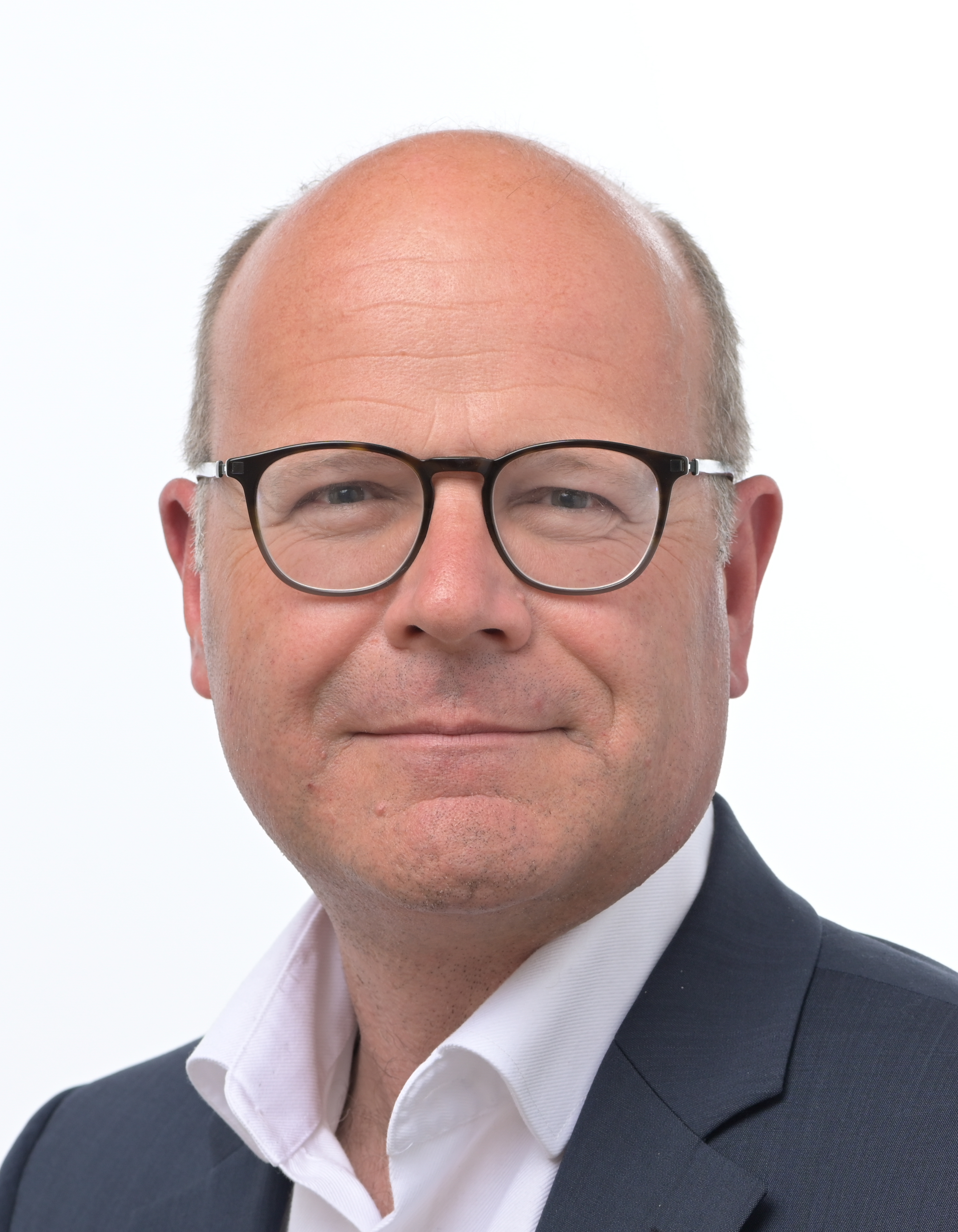
- Schenk in 2024

Member of the European Parliament for Germany
- Incumbent
- Assumed office 16 July 2024

Personal details
- Born: 14 August 1968 (age 57)
- Party: Christian Democratic Union
- Other political affiliations: European People's Party

Oliver Georg Ferdinand Schenk (born 14 August 1968) is a German politician of the Christian Democratic Union (CDU) who was elected member of the European Parliament in 2024.

== Career in public administration ==
From 2014 to 2017, Schenk served as director-general for health policy at the Federal Ministry of Health.

Schenk served as head of the State Chancellery of Saxony in the government of Minister-President Michael Kretschmer from 2017 to 2024.

== Political career ==
In parliament, Schenk has since been serving on the Committee on the Environment, Public Health and Food Safety and its Subcommittee on Public Health. In addition to his committee assignments, he is part of the parliament’s delegations to the Euronest Parliamentary Assembly and for relations with China.
