= Andreas Glück =

German politician

Andreas Glück MEP
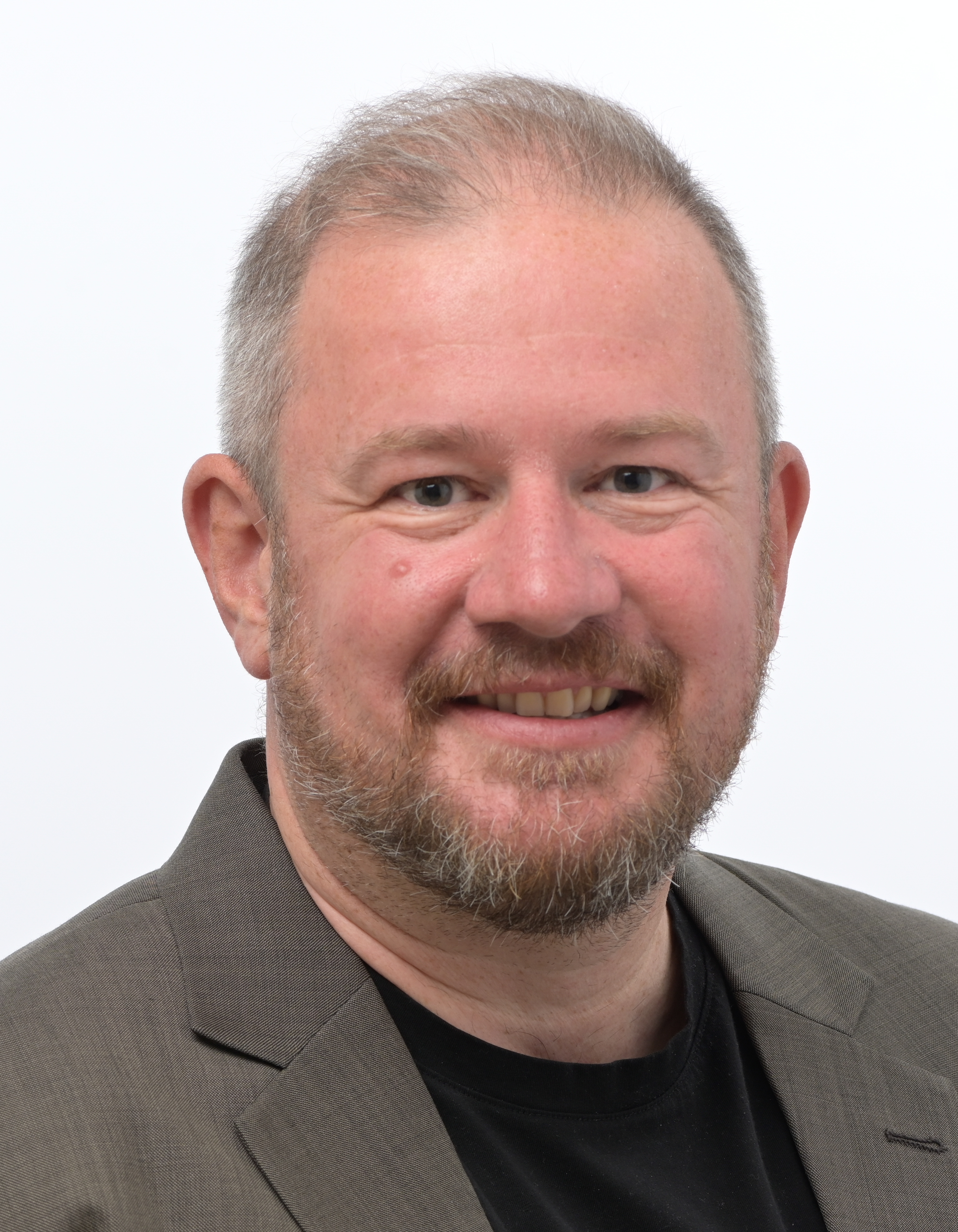

Member of the European Parliament for Germany

Personal details
- Born: March 8, 1975 (age 51) Münsingen, West Germany
- Party: German: Free Democratic Party; EU: Alliance of Liberals and Democrats for Europe
- Education: University of Tübingen

Andreas Glück is a German surgeon and politician. A member of the Alliance of Liberals and Democrats for Europe, he has been serving as a Member of the European Parliament since 2019.

== Education ==
In 1997, Glück spent three months in Bosnia and Herzegovina for the aid organization HELP. Afterwards, he studied human medicine at the University of Tübingen.

== Medical career ==
Early in his career, Glück worked as an assistant doctor in the surgery department of the Reutlingen district hospitals. Since 2009, he has been practicing as a specialist in surgery.

== Political career ==
From the 2011 state elections to 2018, Glück was as a member of the Landtag of Baden-Württemberg. From 2016 until 2018, he served as his parliamentary group's deputy chairman.

Glück has been a Member of the European Parliament since the 2019 European elections. He has since been serving on the Committee on the Environment, Public Health and Food Safety. In 2022, he also joined the Special Committee on the COVID-19 pandemic.

In addition to his committee assignments, Glück is part of the Parliament's Delegation for relations with South Africa. He is also a member of the European Parliament Intergroup on Freedom of Religion or Belief and Religious Tolerance, the European Parliament Intergroup on Seas, Rivers, Islands and Coastal Areas and the MEPs Against Cancer group.
