= Pierfrancesco Maran =

Italian politician (born 1980)

Pierfrancesco Maran MEP
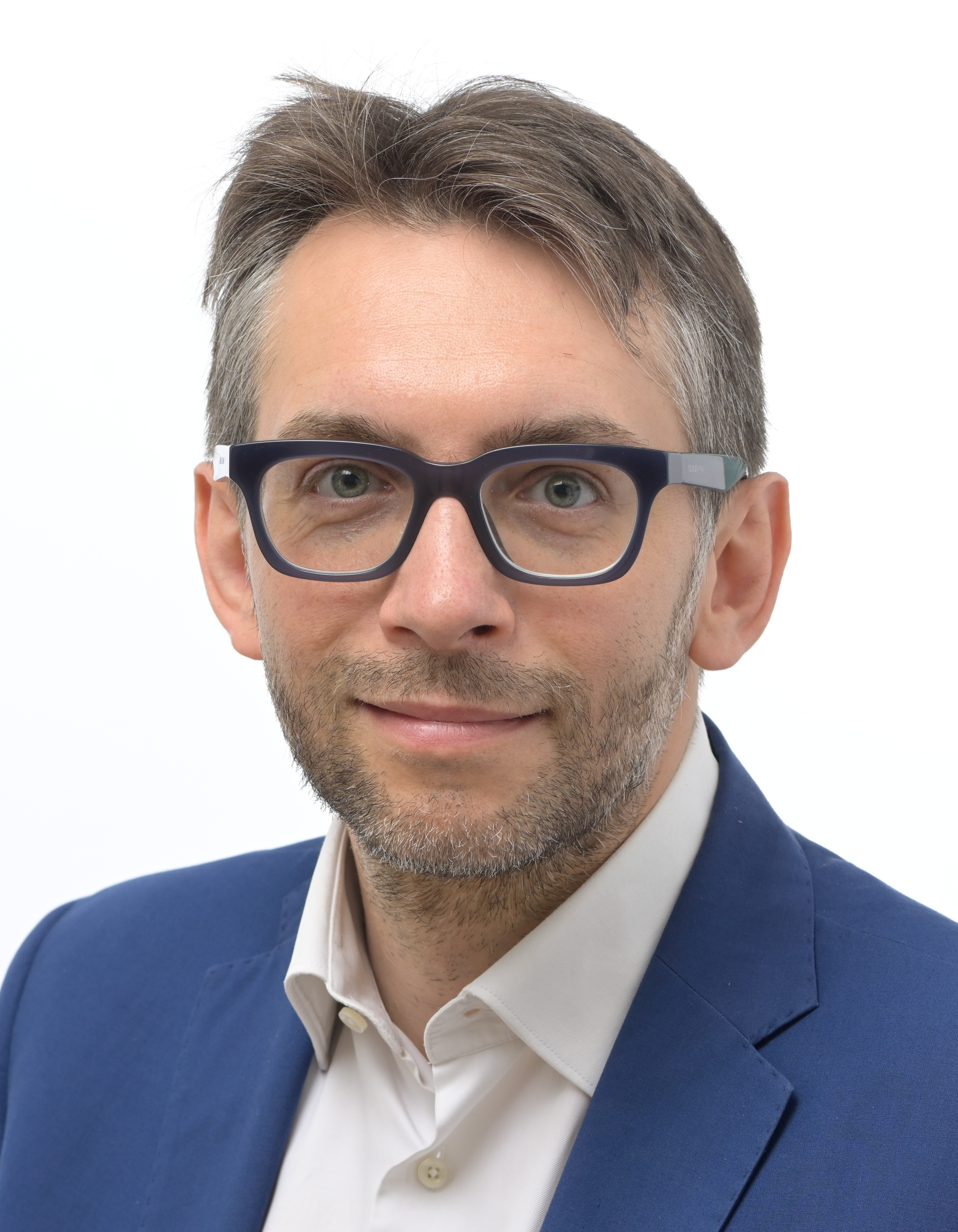
- Maran in 2024.

Member of the European Parliament
- Incumbent
- Assumed office 16 July 2024
- Constituency: North-West Italy

Personal details
- Born: 27 May 1980 (age 46) Milan, Italy
- Party: DS (1997-2007); PD (since 2007)
- Other political affiliations: Party of European Socialists
- Education: University of Milan
- Profession: Business consultant

Pierfrancesco Maran (born 27 May 1980) is an Italian politician of the Democratic Party who was elected member of the European Parliament in 2024. He served in the City Council of Milan from 2006 to 2024.

== Biography ==
Born in Milan, where he grew up in the Porta Venezia neighborhood, he earned his high school diploma from the “Alessandro Volta” State Science High School and a bachelor’s degree in political science from the State University of Milan, with a thesis on the Orange Revolution in Ukraine. He then began his professional career as a business consultant.

In 2018, news published in various media outlets received widespread media coverage: it concerned a wiretap that emerged from the case files of an investigation by the Rome Public Prosecutor’s Office, in which several individuals under investigation for corruption described an offer made to Maran—then Councilor for Urban Planning—of an apartment, which he refused.

He wrote the book Le città visibili. Dove inizia il cambiamento del Paese, published by Solferino in 2022, which, drawing on his political background and his experience governing Milan as part of the center-left coalition, explores the transformations currently taking place in major European cities, particularly in light of the COVID-19 pandemic.
