= Andreas Schwab =

German politician (born 1973)

Andreas Schwab MEP
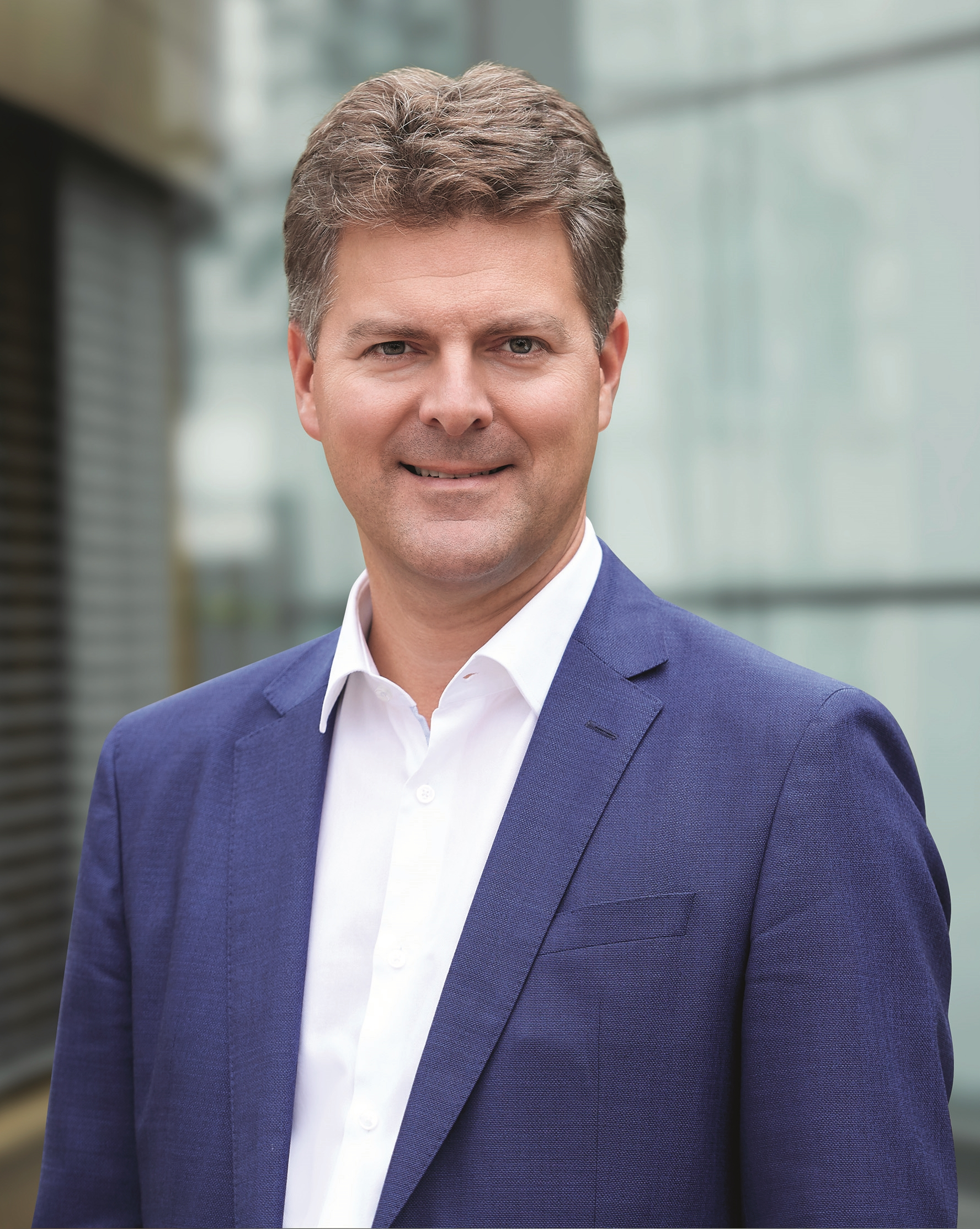
- Schwab in 2018

Member of the European Parliament
- Incumbent
- Assumed office 1 July 2004
- Constituency: Germany

Personal details
- Born: 9 April 1973 (age 53) Rottweil, Baden-Württemberg, Germany
- Party: Christian Democratic Union; European People's Party
- Education: University of Freiburg; Sciences Po; University of Wales
- Website: www.andreas-schwab.de

Andreas Schwab (born 9 April 1973) is a German politician and member of the European Parliament for Germany. He is a member of the Christian Democratic Union, part of the European People's Party. Since 2009, he has been Of Counsel with CMS Hasche Sigle.

== Member of the European Parliament, 2004–present ==
Schwab serves on the Committee on the Internal Market and Consumer Protection (IMCO), where he deals with network and information security. He is the European People's Party Group’s coordinator on the committee.

From 2010 to 2011, Schwab drafted the European Parliament's report on the EU Consumer Rights Directive. As shadow rapporteur, he has issued opinions on the negotiations for the Transatlantic Trade and Investment Partnership (2015) and on the Annual Report on EU Competition Policy (2015). In 2014, he co-sponsored (with Ramon Tremosa) a non-binding bill before the European Parliament calling on the European Commission to consider separating Google’s search-engine business from its other commercial activities to ensure fair competition on the internet. He also led the European Parliament's negotiating team on internet platform regulation in Europe. He later served as rapporteur on the ECN+ Directive that entered in law early 2019, handing national competition authorities more enforcement powers to ensure the functioning of the EU's single market.

In 2021, Schwab became the parliament's rapporteur on the Digital Markets Act. In addition, Schwab serves as a member of the European Parliament's Sky and Space Intergroup (SSI). as well as the European Parliament Intergroup on Biodiversity, Countryside, Hunting and Recreational Fisheries.

== Other activities ==
- University of Freiburg, Member of the Advisory Board
- Franco-German Institute (DFI), Member of the Board
- Nachsorgeklinik Tannheim, Member of the Board of Trustees
- European Council on Foreign Relations (ECFR), Member
- Kangaroo Group, Member
- Transatlantic Policy Network (TPN), Member
- European Internet Foundation, Member
- European Logistics Platform, Member of the Advisory Board

== Awards ==
In 1998, Schwab was elected for the "Young European of the Year" due to his commitment to Franco-German relations and received a scholarship from the Heinz Schwarzkopf Foundation. In 2018, he received the Federal Cross of Merit of the Federal Republic of Germany.
