= Valentina Palmisano =

Italian politician (born 1983)

Valentina Palmisano MEP
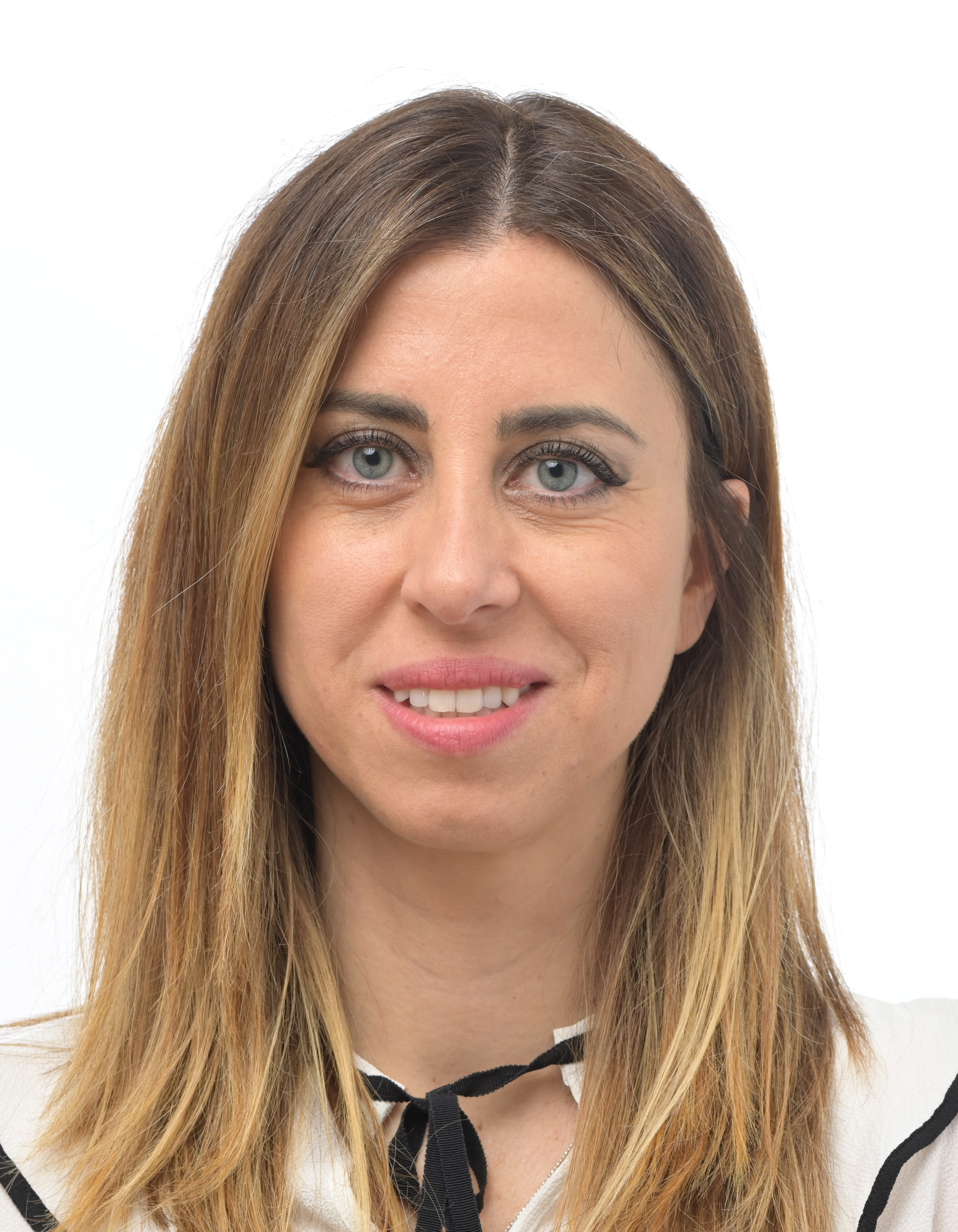
- Palmisano in 2024

Member of the European Parliament for Southern Italy
- Incumbent
- Assumed office 16 July 2024

Member of the Chamber of Deputies
- In office 23 March 2018 – 12 October 2022
- Constituency: Apulia

Personal details
- Born: 24 January 1983 (age 43) Brindisi, Italy
- Party: Five Star Movement
- Other political affiliations: The Left
- Education: University of Salento
- Profession: Lawyer

Valentina Palmisano (born 24 January 1983) is an Italian politician of the Five Star Movement who was elected member of the European Parliament in 2024. She served as member of the Chamber of Deputies from 2018 to 2022, and has been president of the city council of Ostuni since 2023.
