= Viktória Ferenc =

Hungarian politician (born 1984)

Viktória Ferenc MEP
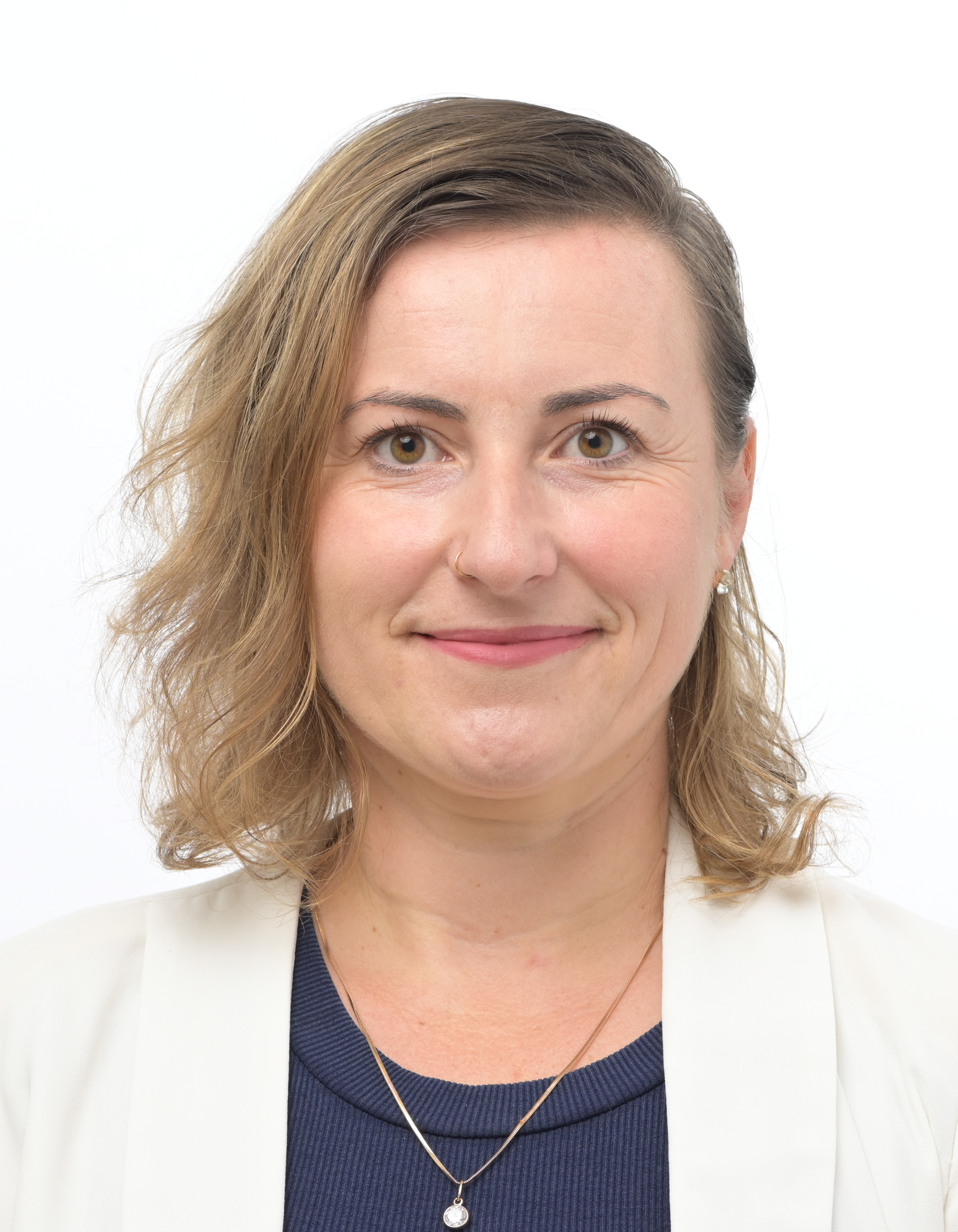
- Official portrait, 2024

Member of the European Parliament for Hungary
- Incumbent
- Assumed office 16 July 2024

Personal details
- Born: 12 June 1984 (age 42) Pallo, Ukrainian SSR, Soviet Union
- Citizenship: Hungary • Ukraine
- Party: Fidesz
- Other political affiliations: Patriots for Europe
- Education: University of Pécs

Viktória Ferenc (born 12 June 1984) is a Hungarian linguist and politician of Fidesz who was elected member of the European Parliament in 2024.

== Early life and career ==
Ferenc was born in Pallo in modern-day Ukraine. She enrolled at the University of Pécs in Hungary in 2006. In February 2013, she became a full-time researcher at the National Policy Research Institute, where she remained for 10 years.
