= Giorgos Georgiou =

Greek media personality (1947–2023)

Giorgios Georgiou
- Γιώργος Γεωργίου
- Born: 26 May 1947; Athens, Greece
- Died: 5 June 2023 (aged 76); Athens, Greece
- Occupation: Sports journalist
- Children: 2 or 3 (one deceased)

Giorgos Georgiou (Greek: Γιώργος Γεωργίου; 26 May 1947 – 5 June 2023) was a Greek television and radio personality.

He started his career as a journalist in 1983 in the sport newspaper "Φίλαθλος" (Filathlos, translating "Sports Fan").

In November 1992 he started hosting the radio show "The Sport Fans' Cafe" (Greek: "Το Καφενείο των Φιλάθλων") on Sprint FM 105.3 which was the first sports radio station in Greece. The show was so popular that in September 1995 became also a daily column to "Filathlos" newspaper. From 1996 he also hosted his show on several TV channels in Greece until 2019.

He was a supporter of Apollon Smyrnis F.C. and served as the chairman of the board of directors of the team from 2 April 2019 until 28 May 2019. He then remained a member of the board of directors until his death.

Georgiou died from cancer in Athens, on 5 June 2023, at the age of 76.
