= Liesbet Sommen =

Belgian politician (born 1984)

Liesbet Sommen MEP
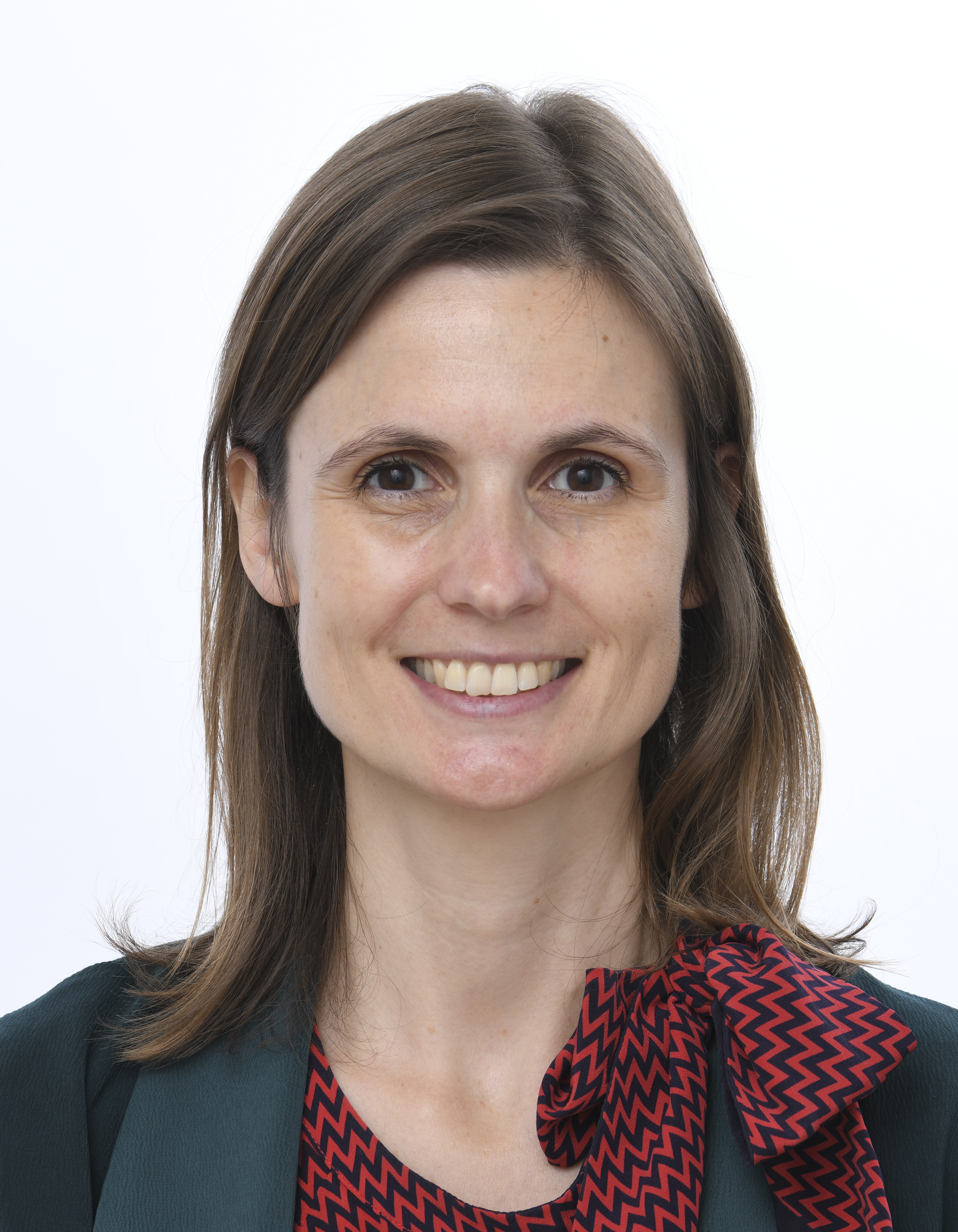

Member of the European Parliament for Belgium
- Incumbent
- Assumed office 16 July 2024

Personal details
- Born: 13 April 1984 (age 42) Turnhout, Belgium
- Party: Christian Democratic and Flemish
- Other political affiliations: European People's Party

Liesbet Sommen (born 13 April 1984) is a Belgian politician of Christian Democratic and Flemish who was elected member of the European Parliament in 2024.

== Personal life ==
Sommen was born in Turnhout in 1984. She lives in Sint-Katelijne-Waver, and has two biological children and three step-daughters.
