= Majdouline Sbaï =

French politician and sociologist (born 1977)

Majdouline Sbaï MEP
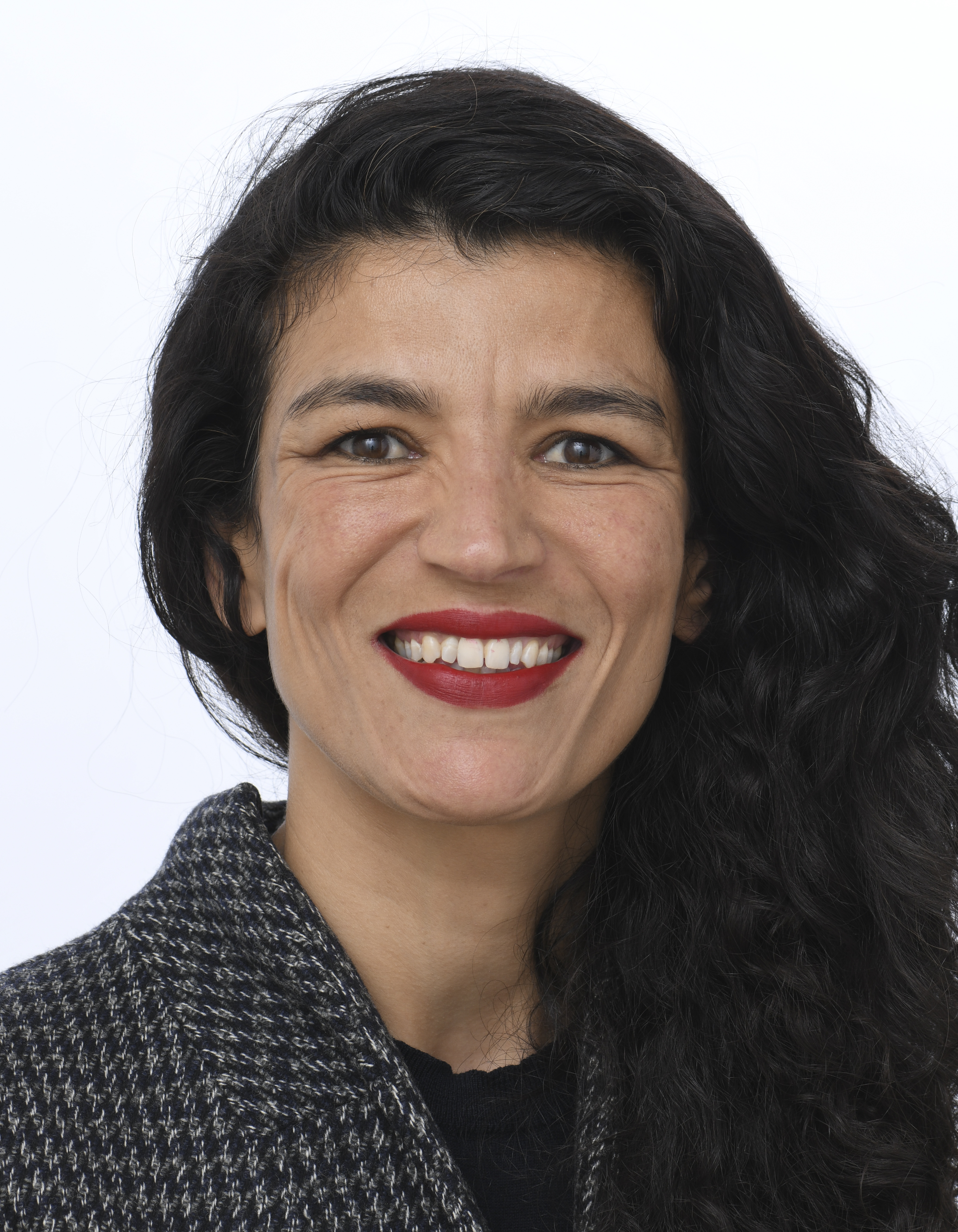

Member of the European Parliament for France
- Incumbent
- Assumed office 16 July 2024

Personal details
- Born: 10 September 1977 (age 48)
- Party: Europe Ecology – The Greens

Majdouline Sbaï (born 10 September 1977) is a French sociologist and politician who was first elected as a Member of the European Parliament in 2024.
