= Marie-Luce Brasier-Clain =

French politician (born 1959)

Marie-Luce Brasier-Clain MEP
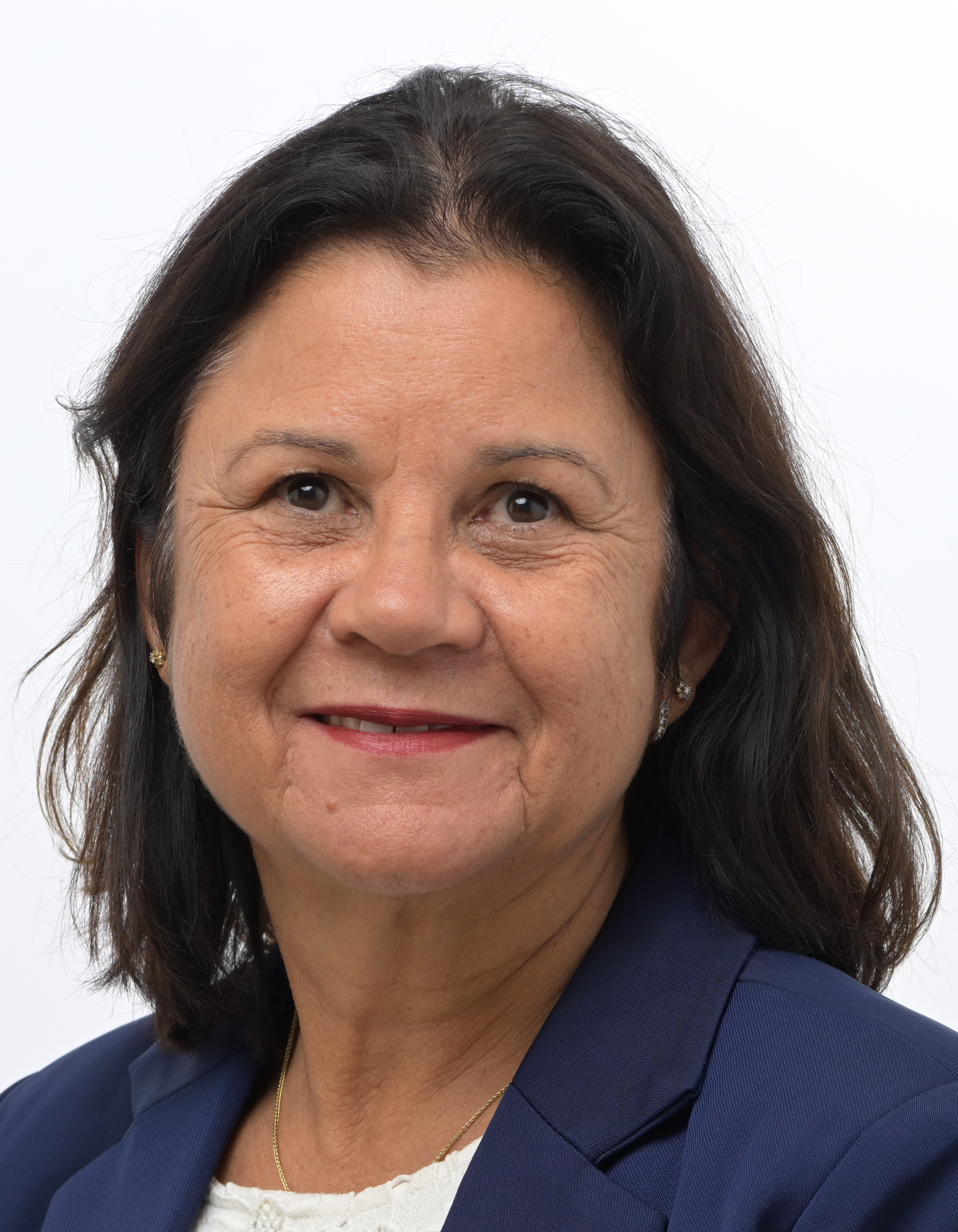

Member of the European Parliament for France
- Incumbent
- Assumed office 16 July 2024

Personal details
- Born: 19 October 1959 (age 66)
- Party: National Rally
- Other political affiliations: Identity and Democracy Party

Marie-Luce Brasier-Clain (née Clain; born 19 October 1959) is a French politician of the National Rally who was elected member of the European Parliament in 2024.

== See also ==
- List of members of the European Parliament (2024–2029)
