= Friedrich Pürner =

German physician and politician

Friedrich Pürner MEP
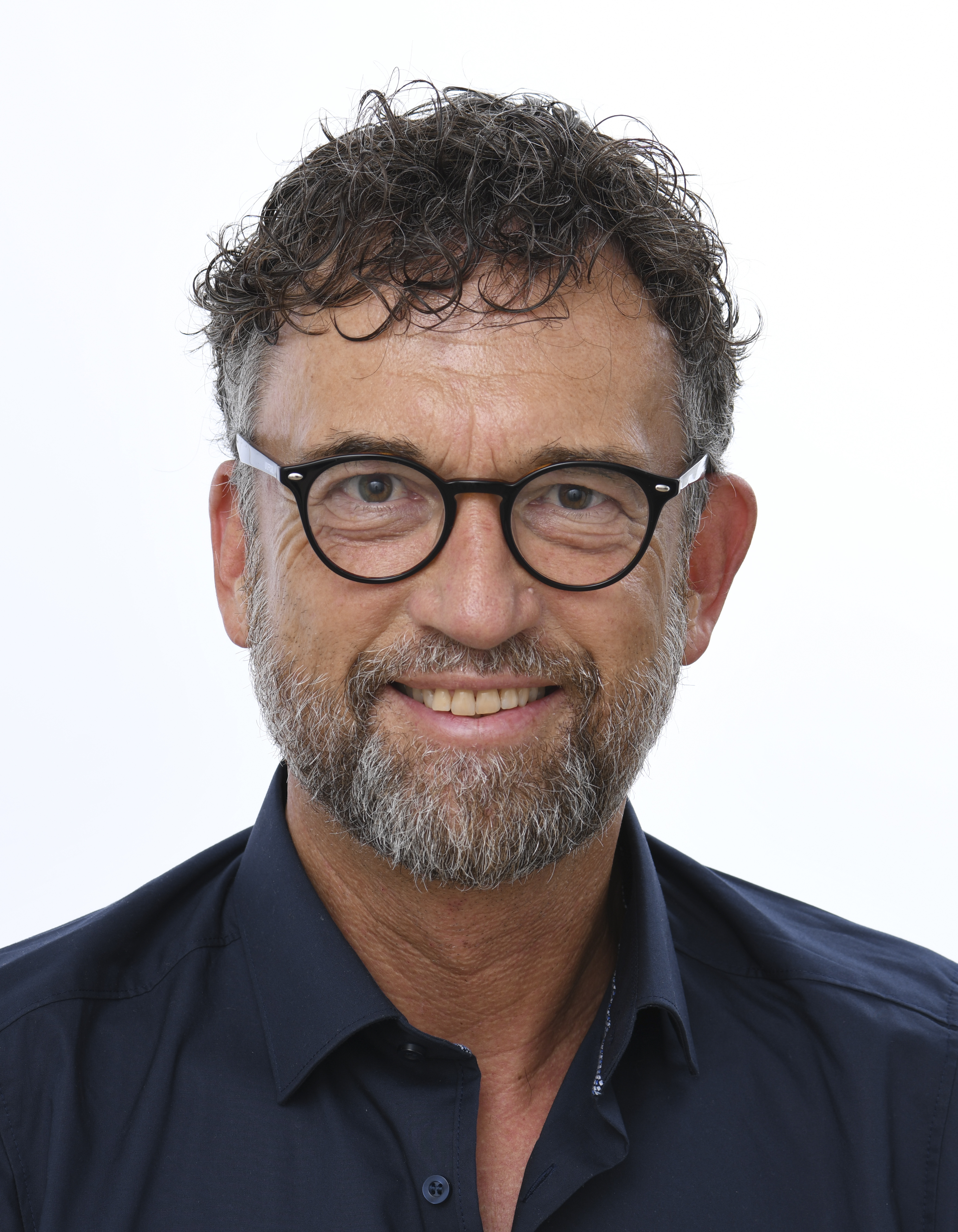
- Pürner in 2024

Member of the European Parliament for Germany
- Incumbent
- Assumed office 16 July 2024

Personal details
- Born: 1967 (age 58–59) Munich, West Germany
- Party: Independent (since 2025)
- Other political affiliations: BSW (2024–2025)
- Education: LMU Munich

Friedrich Pürner (born 1967) is an independent German politician. In the 2024 European Parliament election he was elected a Member of the European Parliament (MEP).

== Life ==
Pürner was born in Munich.

In 2010, Pürner received his doctorate from the medical faculty of LMU Munich. He later headed the health department in the district of Aichach-Friedberg.

He lost this position in autumn 2020 after he publicly spoke out against the strategy of the Bavarian state government during the COVID-19 pandemic. In 2023, he successfully sued against an assessment that plays an important role in filling positions. For example, it should be examined again whether Pürner should fill the positions at the Munich District Office, the Government of Lower Bavaria and the Government of Upper Franconia.

== Political career ==
In the 2024 European elections, he was elected to the European Parliament as sixth place on the Bündnis Sahra Wagenknecht party list.

On 6 February 2025, he decided to quit the BSW, citing a culture of "mistrust and surveillance" in the party as a reason for his unease.

== Political positions ==
=== COVID-19 measures ===
As head of the Aichach health department, Pürner criticized the corona measures and doubted the effectiveness of fabric masks and the sense of a mask requirement for children. He also criticized the Bavarian curfew and quarantine for entire school classes.

=== Russo-Ukrainian War ===
On 8 May 2025, Pürner was one of the three MEPs who voted against a motion calling for the return of children abducted by Russia in its invasion of Ukraine. As stated in his written explanation of vote he strongly condemns all acts of violence and complicity in the mistreatment of Ukrainian children, whether through exploitation, sexual abuse, militarization or murder. There must be no such crimes and they must stop immediately. Ukrainian children must be returned to their families intact, unconditionally and safely. Pürner criticized that the vote was held on 8 May 2025, i.e. on the 80th anniversary of the end of the Second World War.

== Bibliography ==
- Diagnose Pan(ik)demie: Das kranke Gesundheitssystem. Langen Mueller Herbig. 2021. ISBN 9783784484075.

== See also ==
- List of members of the European Parliament (2024–2029)
