= Estelle Ceulemans =

Belgian politician and trade unionist

Estelle Ceulemans MEP
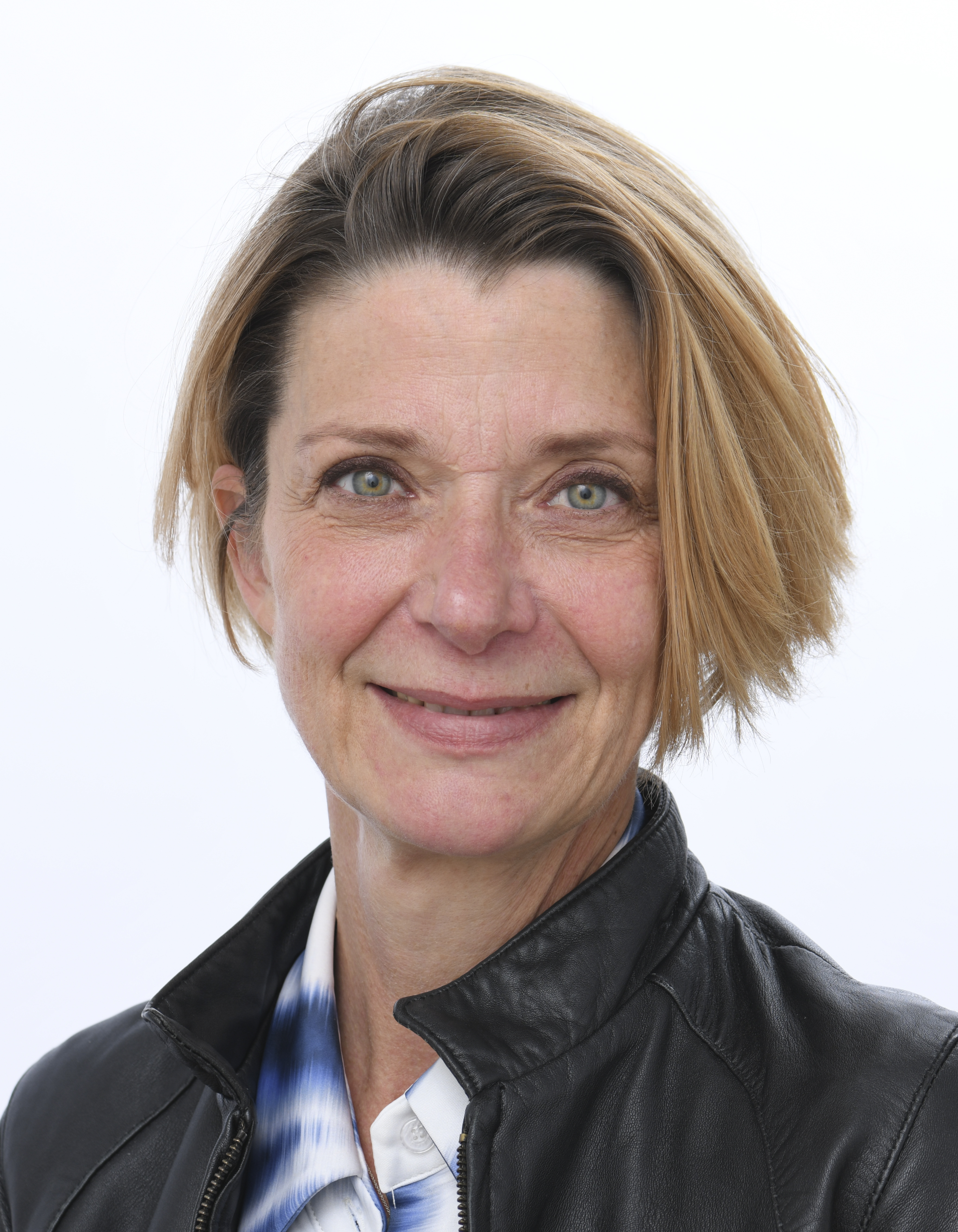
- Official portrait, 2024

Member of the European Parliament for Belgium
- Incumbent
- Assumed office 16 July 2024
- Constituency: French-speaking electoral college

Personal details
- Born: 12 February 1970 (age 56) Liège, Belgium
- Party: Socialist Party
- Education: Université libre de Bruxelles

Estelle Ceulemans (born 12 February 1970) is a Belgian politician, trade unionist and former academic. A member of the Socialist Party, she has been a Member of the European Parliament (MEP) since the 2024 European Parliament election.

She was previously secretary general of the FGTB Brussels from 2018 to 2024.

== Early life and education ==
Ceulemans was born on 12 February 1970 in Rocourt, Liège. She studied at the Université libre de Bruxelles (ULB), where she obtained a postgraduate diploma (DES) in human resource management.

== See also ==
- List of members of the European Parliament (2024–2029)
