= Margarita de la Pisa Carrión =

Spanish politician

Margarita de la Pisa Carrión MEP
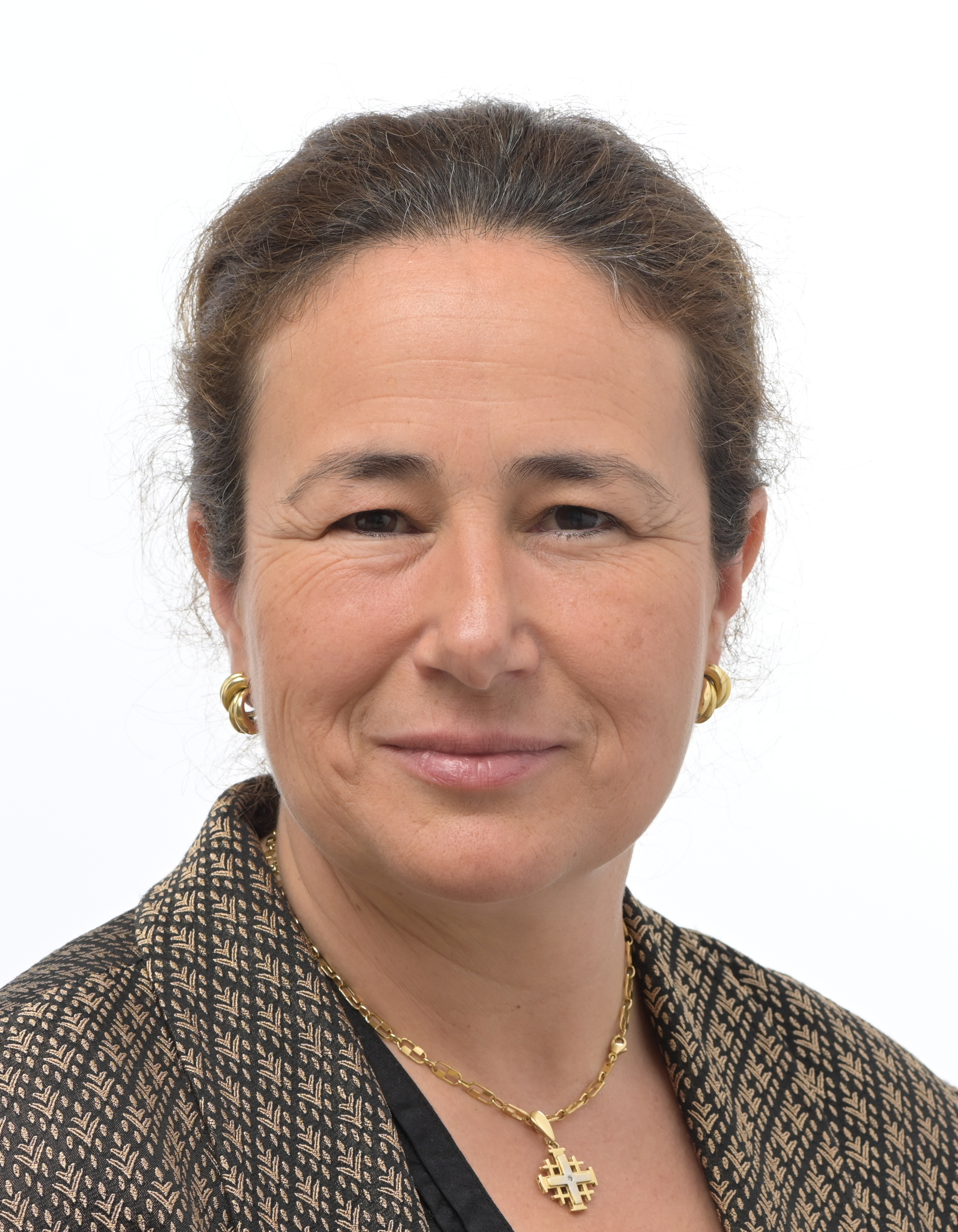

Member of the European Parliament for Spain
- Incumbent
- Assumed office 1 February 2020

Personal details
- Born: 19 September 1976 (age 50) Madrid, Spain
- Party: Vox
- Education: Complutense University of Madrid

Margarita de la Pisa Carrión (pronounced [maɾɣaˈɾita ðe la ˈpisa kaˈrjon]; born 19 September 1975) is a Spanish politician of the political party Vox, who was elected as a Member of the European Parliament in 2019. She became an MEP on 1 February 2020 after Brexit.

Carrión was appointed to the EU Special Committee on COVID-19, in which capacity she questioned why all treatment and prevention discussion seemed to be restricted to vaccines, noting that re-vaccinating people continually would weaken their immune systems, and that effects on pregnant women were inadequately known.

== See also ==
- List of members of the European Parliament for Spain, 2019–2024
