= Yvan Verougstraete =

Belgian politician

Yvan Verougstraete MEP
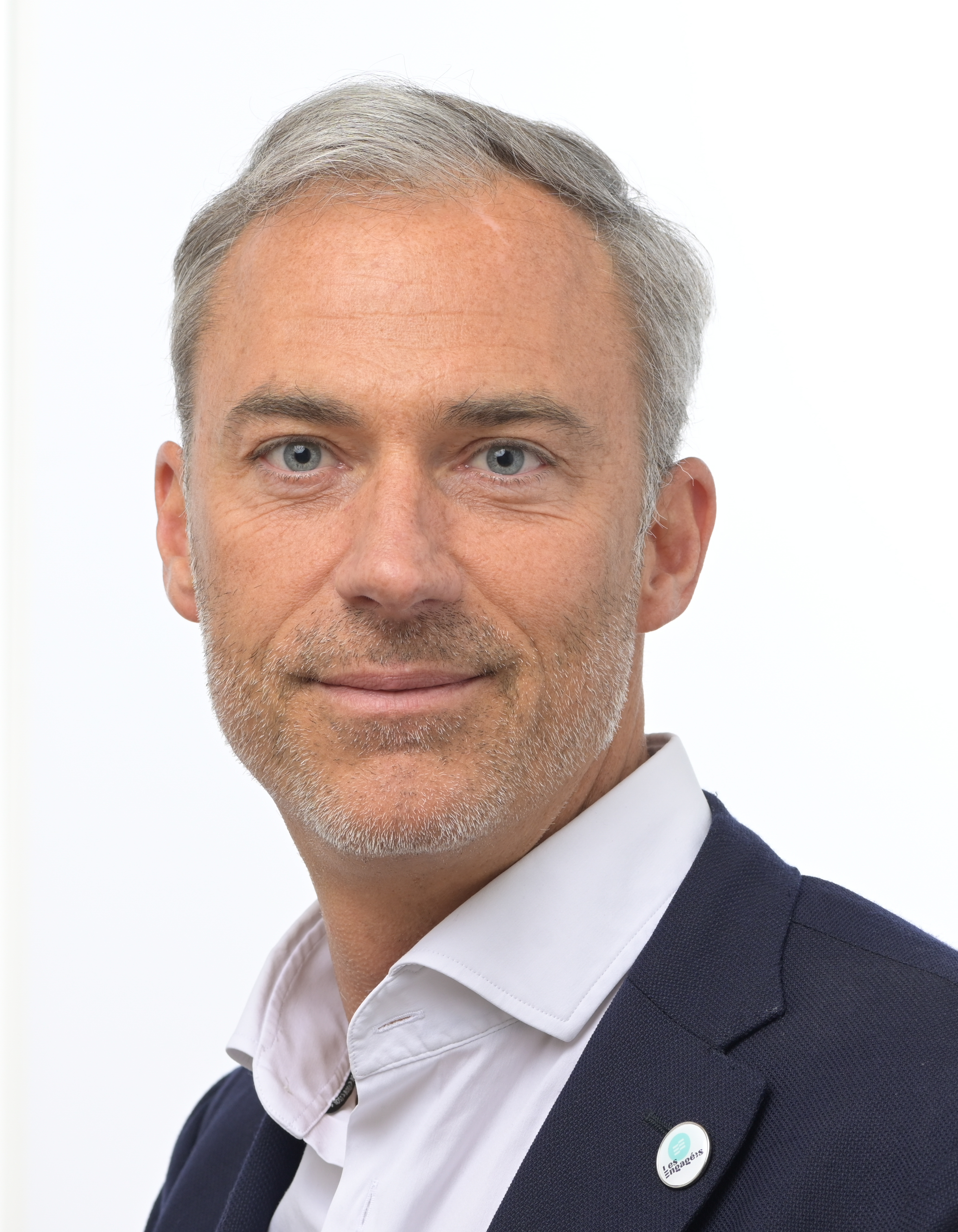
- Official portrait, 2024

Member of the European Parliament for Belgium
- Incumbent
- Assumed office 16 July 2024
- Parliamentary group: Renew Europe

Personal details
- Born: 5 October 1975 (age 50)
- Party: Les Engagés (2022–present)
- Other political affiliations: PSC/CDH (1994–2022)
- Education: St. Michael's College, Brussels
- Alma mater: UCLouvain; Vlerick Business School
- Occupation: Jurist • Politician

Yvan Verougstraete (born 6 October 1975) is a Belgian politician, member of the center-right party Les Engagés. On 20 June, his party left the EPP to join Renew Europe.

== Political life ==
In 1994, at the age of 18, he became the country's youngest local councillor in his native Woluwe-Saint-Pierre.

In 2021, after leaving Medi-Market, Yvan Verougstraete returned to politics and became a member of the Les Engagés party, of which he is now president of. President.

He is the lead candidate for Les Engagés in the European elections on Junes, 2024. He was elected as a Member of the European Parliament on 9 June 2024 with 63530 votes in favor.
