= Emmanouil Fragkos =

Greek politician (born 1993)

Emmanouil Fragkos MEP
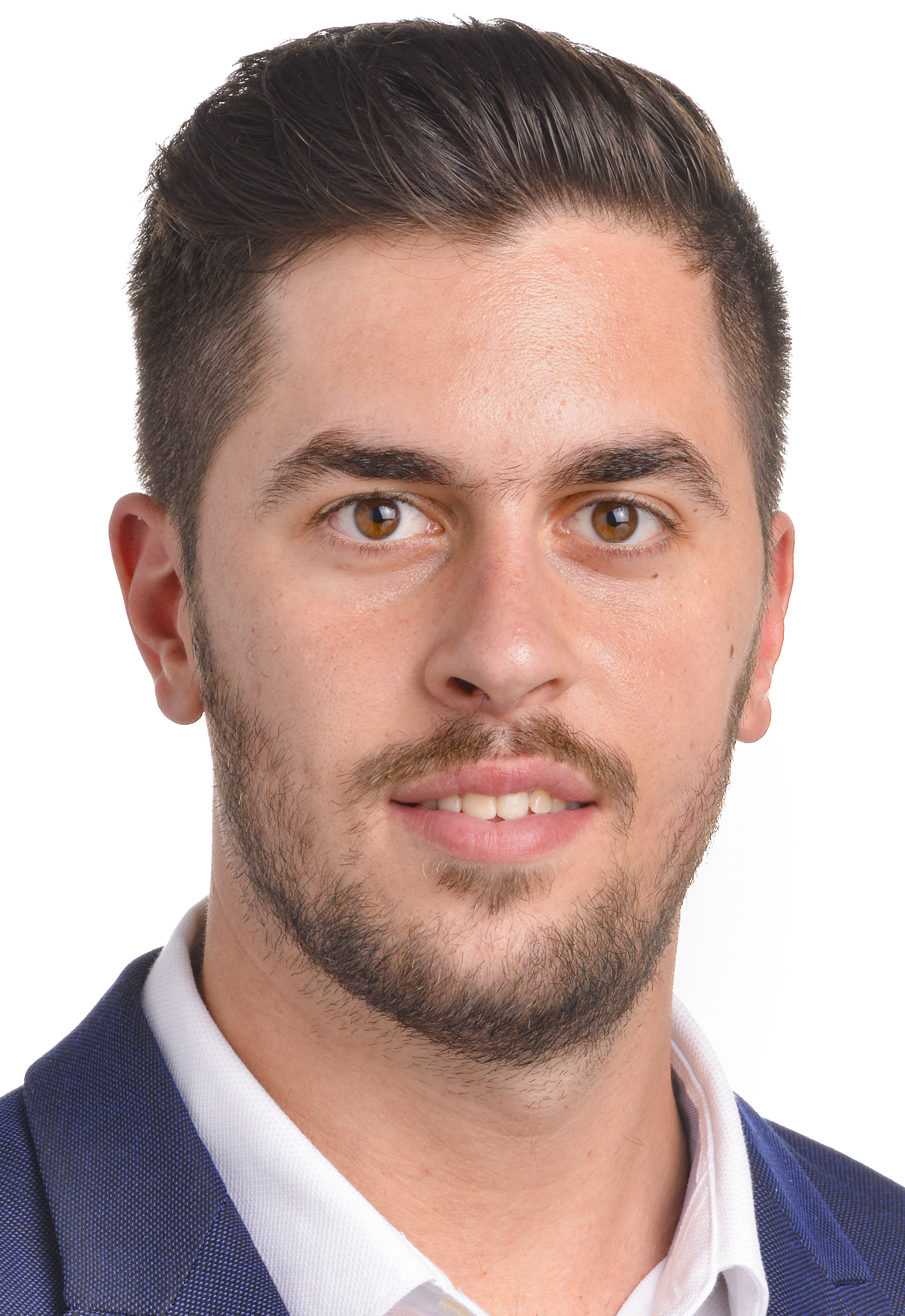
- Fragkos in 2019

Member of the European Parliament for Greece
- Incumbent
- Assumed office 7 July 2019

Personal details
- Born: 27 June 1993 (age 33) Chios, Greece
- Party: Greek Solution
- Education: Aristotle University of Thessaloniki
- Profession: Veterinarian

Emmanouil Fragkos (Greek: Εμμανουήλ «Μανώλης» Φράγκος) is a Greek politician currently serving as a Member of the European Parliament for the right-wing Greek Solution party.

== Education ==
Fragkos graduated from the School of Veterinary Medicine of Aristotle University of Thessaloniki in November 2016.

== European parliament ==
He was a candidate with the Greek Solution party on the elections for the European Parliament of 2019. The party received enough votes to elect a representative, with Kyriakos Velopoulos, the head of the party receiving the most votes and Fragkos receiving the second highest amount. After the national elections, Velopoulos was elected in the National Parliament and therefore forfeited his position in the European Parliament, handing the position to Fragkos.

Fragkos would sign the Madrid Charter while in office, joining the right-wing alliance organized by Spanish political party Vox.
