= Raffaele Topo =

Italian politician (born 1965)

Raffaele Topo MEP
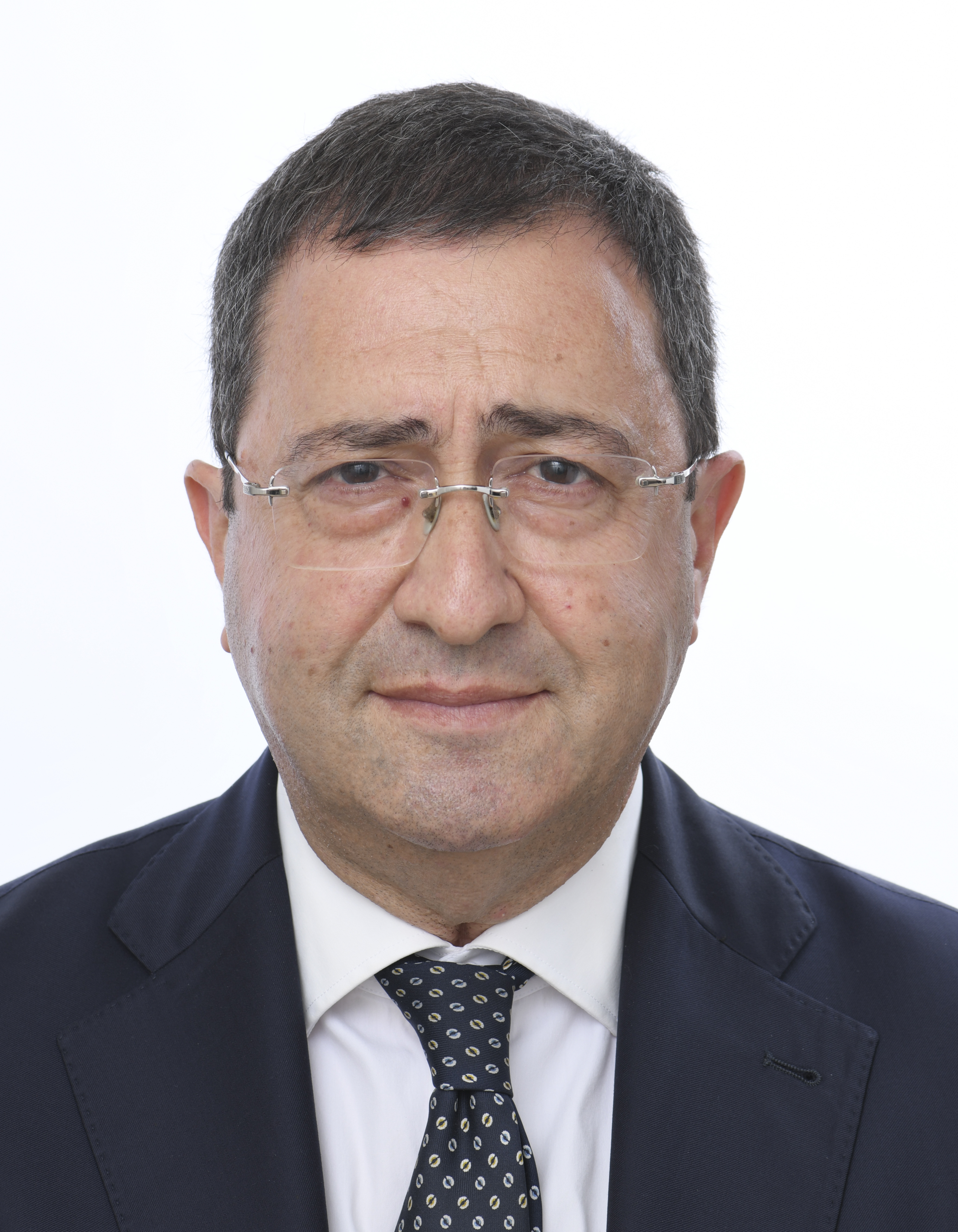
- Topo in 2024

Member of the European Parliament for Southern Italy
- Incumbent
- Assumed office 16 July 2024

Personal details
- Born: 2 March 1965 (age 61)
- Party: Democratic Party
- Other political affiliations: Party of European Socialists

Raffaele Topo (born 2 March 1965) is an Italian politician of the Democratic Party who was elected member of the European Parliament in 2024. He served in the Chamber of Deputies from 2018 to 2022, and as mayor of Villaricca from 2001 to 2010.
