= Michele Picaro =

Italian politician (born 1981)

Michele Picaro MEP
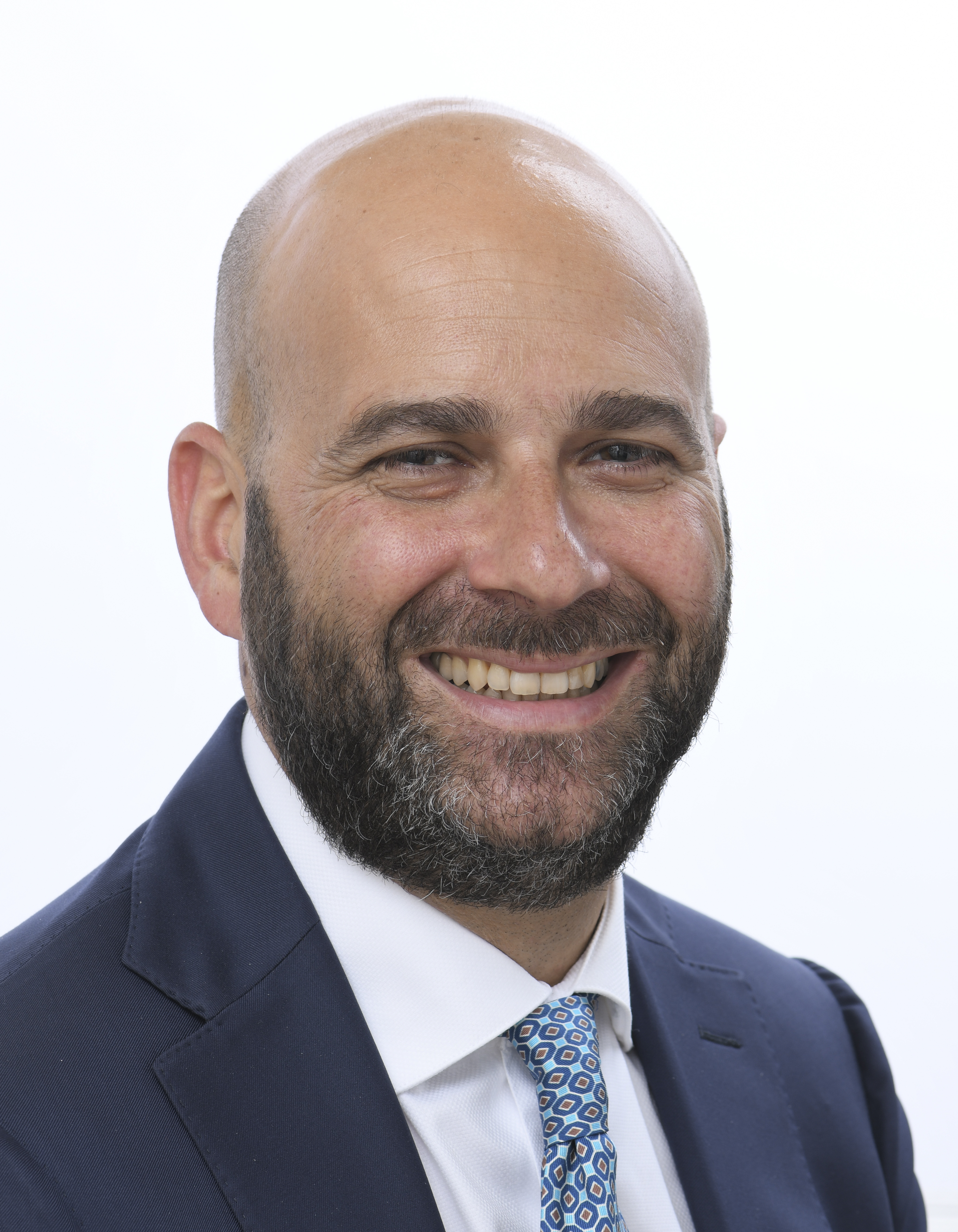
- Picaro in 2024

Member of the European Parliament for Southern Italy
- Incumbent
- Assumed office 16 July 2024

Personal details
- Born: 15 May 1981 (age 44)
- Party: Brothers of Italy
- Other political affiliations: European Conservatives and Reformists Party

Michele Picaro (born 15 May 1981) is an Italian politician of Brothers of Italy who was elected member of the European Parliament in 2024. He previously served as municipal councillor of Bari and as a member of the Regional Council of Apulia.
