= Gerald Hauser =

Austrian politician (born 1961)

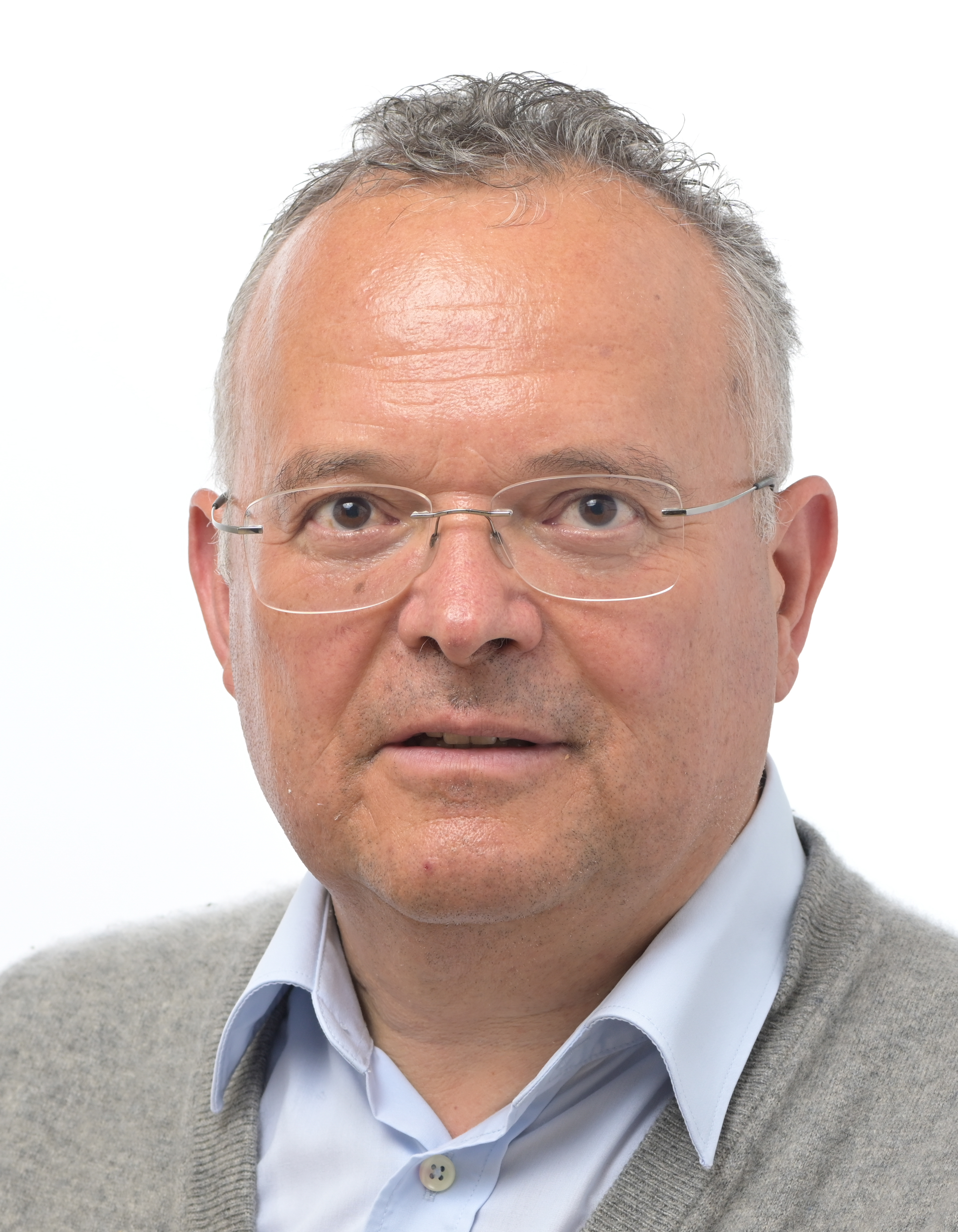
- Official portrait, 2024

Member of the European Parliament
- Incumbent
- Assumed office 16 July 2024

Member of the National Council
- In office 29 October 2013 – 15 July 2024
- In office 30 October 2006 – 7 July 2008

Personal details
- Born: 30 September 1961 (age 64) Sankt Jakob in Defereggen, Tyrol, Austria
- Party: Austrian; Freedom Party of Austria; EU; Patriots.eu

Gerald Hauser (born 30 September 1961) is an Austrian politician who is a member of European Parliament, and formerly a member of the National Council, for the Freedom Party of Austria (FPÖ).

== Early life ==
Hauser was born in St. Jakob in Defereggen. He attended elementary school between 1968 and 1972 and then went to the Realgymnasium in Linz, where he graduated in 1980. He then began studying business education at the University of Innsbruck, which he completed in 1985.

In 1985, Hauser began teaching at the commercial academy and commercial school in Lienz. In addition to his work as a teacher, Hauser has been the tourism chairman of the municipality of St. Jakob in Defereggen since 1988.

== Early political career ==
Hauser would be elected to the Landtag of Tyrol in 1999, and would serve until 2003. Hauser would also be State Party Chairman of the FPÖ Tyrol from 2004-2013.

== Member of the National Council ==
In the 2006 election, Hauser would be placed 4th on the FPÖ party list and the top candidate for Tyrol. Hauser would be elected, and serve for 2 years as a member of the National Council.

Hauser would not run for re-election in 2008.

In the 2013 election, Hauser would be placed 284th on the party list and 2nd on the Tyrol state list. Hauser would be elected back to the National Council after a 5 year hiatus.

In the 2017 election, Hauser would be placed 43rd on the party list and 3rd on the Tyrol state list. Hauser would be re-elected. In 2019, Hauser would be placed 46th on the party list and 5th on the Tyrol state list. He would be re-elected.

== Member of the European Parliament ==
In the 2024 European elections, Hauser would be placed 5th on the FPÖ list. As the party won six seats, Hauser would be elected and join the PfE group.

=== Committees and Delegations ===
==== 10th European Parliament ====
- Committee on Public Health
- Delegation for Northern cooperation and for relations with Switzerland and Norway and to the EU-Iceland Joint Parliamentary Committee and the European Economic Area (EEA) Joint Parliamentary Committee
- Delegation to the EU-Russia Parliamentary Cooperation Committee
- Delegation for relations with Belarus
- Delegation to the Euronest Parliamentary Assembly

=== Promotion of vaccine hesitancy ===
Hauser is "a vocal critic of Europe's vaccine strategy" and a promoter of vaccine hesitancy. He submitted a series of written parliamentary questions relating to the Comirnaty COVID-19 vaccine which fact-checkers flagged as supporting misleading claims about the EU's approval of COVID vaccines. Subsequently, Hauser submitted another written parliamentary question asking whether, in light of changes in policy by the US Centers for Disease Control and Prevention, doctors would "be breaching their legal duty of disclosure by not informing parents of a possible risk of autism associated with vaccines".
