= European Parliament Committee on Foreign Affairs =

European Parliament committee

Committee on Foreign Affairs
- Abbreviation: AFET
- Type: Standing committee
- Legislature: European Parliament
- Parliamentary term: 10th European Parliament
- Chair: David McAllister; EPP, Germany
- Vice-Chairs: Hana Jalloul Muro (S&D); Urmas Paet (Renew); Alberico Gambino (ECR); Ioan-Rareș Bogdan (EPP)
- Members: 79
- Political composition: EPP: 21 · S&D: 15 · ECR: 9 · Renew: 8 · PfE: 9 · Greens/EFA: 6 · The Left: 5 · ESN: 3 · NI: 3
- Jurisdiction: Common foreign and security policy, external relations, enlargement, international agreements, human rights and parliamentary oversight of the European External Action Service
- Counterpart: Foreign Affairs Council
- Website: Official website

The Committee on Foreign Affairs (AFET) is a standing committee of the European Parliament. It is responsible for the political coordination and parliamentary oversight of the European Union's external action, including the Common Foreign and Security Policy, relations with non-EU countries and international organisations, enlargement, international agreements, democracy and human rights, and scrutiny of the European External Action Service.

AFET has 79 full members during the tenth parliamentary term and is assisted by the Subcommittee on Human Rights. The Committee on Security and Defence was formerly an AFET subcommittee but became a separate standing committee in January 2025.

== Responsibilities ==
AFET promotes, shapes and monitors the implementation of the European Union's foreign policy. Its responsibilities include the political aspects of relations with non-EU countries and international organisations, the Union's enlargement and neighbourhood policies, international agreements, democracy support and human rights, and oversight of the European External Action Service.

Its remit includes:

- the Common Foreign and Security Policy, except for matters assigned specifically to the Committee on Security and Defence;
- relations with non-EU countries and international organisations;
- the political aspects of international agreements;
- accession negotiations and the European Neighbourhood Policy;
- democratic governance, the rule of law, human rights and minority rights outside the European Union;
- coordination of parliamentary delegations and joint parliamentary committees;
- scrutiny of the European External Action Service and EU special representatives; and
- the foreign-policy aspects of the Union's budget.

The committee adopts reports and recommendations, holds exchanges of views with foreign ministers, diplomats and international organisations, and examines candidates for senior external-action posts. Parliament's consent is required for many international agreements and for the accession of new member states.

== Foreign-policy scrutiny ==
AFET scrutinises the work of the High Representative of the Union for Foreign Affairs and Security Policy, the European External Action Service and EU special representatives. It adopts an annual report on the Common Foreign and Security Policy, examines external-action expenditure and contributes to parliamentary diplomacy with non-EU countries.

Through missions and parliamentary diplomacy, the committee maintains contacts with parliaments, governments and civil-society organisations outside the European Union. It also considers sanctions, conflicts, enlargement, election observation and the implementation of international agreements.

== Relationship with other committees ==
AFET is assisted by the Subcommittee on Human Rights, which deals with democracy, human rights and minority protection outside the European Union.

The Committee on Security and Defence was established as an AFET subcommittee in 2004. Parliament decided on 18 December 2024 to convert it into a separate standing committee from January 2025. It is therefore no longer a subcommittee of AFET. The two committees nevertheless work on closely connected areas: AFET retains responsibility for the overall political coordination of the Union's external action and the Common Foreign and Security Policy, while SEDE deals specifically with security and defence policy, defence cooperation, military and civilian missions and related capabilities.

== Chairs ==
The following table lists the chairs of the committee since 1999.

Name	Political group	Member state	Took office	Left office
Elmar Brok	EPP–ED	Germany	1999	2007
Jacek Saryusz-Wolski	EPP–ED	Poland	2007	2009
Gabriele Albertini	EPP	Italy	2009	2012
Elmar Brok	EPP	Germany	2012	2017
David McAllister	EPP	Germany	2017	Incumbent

== Members ==
=== 10th Parliament, 2024–2029 ===
The committee currently has 79 full members. Its current composition is shown below, with the chair and vice-chairs indicated in italics.

European People's Party	Progressive Alliance of Socialists and Democrats	European Conservatives and Reformists	Renew Europe
David McAllister, Germany, Chair; Ioan-Rareș Bogdan, Romania, Vice-Chair; Mika Aaltola, Finland; Wouter Beke, Belgium; Sebastião Bugalho, Portugal; Loukas Fourlas, Cyprus; Michael Gahler, Germany; Christophe Gomart, France; Rasa Juknevičienė, Lithuania; Sandra Kalniete, Latvia; Łukasz Kohut, Poland; Ondřej Kolář, Czechia; Andrey Kovatchev, Bulgaria; Reinhold Lopatka, Austria; Antonio López-Istúriz White, Spain; Vangelis Meimarakis, Greece; Francisco José Millán Mon, Spain; Davor Ivo Stier, Croatia; Michał Szczerba, Poland; Riho Terras, Estonia; Željana Zovko, Croatia	Hana Jalloul Muro, Spain, Vice-Chair; Lucia Annunziata, Italy; Robert Biedroń, Poland; Tobias Cremer, Germany; Elio Di Rupo, Belgium; Claudiu Manda, Romania; Costas Mavrides, Cyprus; Sven Mikser, Estonia; Tonino Picula, Croatia; Thijs Reuten, Netherlands; Chloé Ridel, France; Nacho Sánchez Amor, Spain; Andreas Schieder, Austria; Marta Temido, Portugal; Nicola Zingaretti, Italy	Alberico Gambino, Italy, Vice-Chair; Adam Bielan, Poland; Geadis Geadi, Cyprus; Rihards Kols, Latvia; Jaak Madison, Estonia; Marion Maréchal, France; Arkadiusz Mularczyk, Poland; Cristian Terheș, Romania; Sebastian Tynkkynen, Finland	Urmas Paet, Estonia, Vice-Chair; Petras Auštrevičius, Lithuania; Dan Barna, Romania; Helmut Brandstätter, Austria; Bernard Guetta, France; Nathalie Loiseau, France; Marie-Agnes Strack-Zimmermann, Germany; Hilde Vautmans, Belgium
Patriots for Europe	Greens–European Free Alliance	The Left	Europe of Sovereign Nations
Mieke Andriese, Netherlands; Jordan Bardella, France; Jaroslav Bžoch, Czechia; Kinga Gál, Hungary; Silvia Sardone, Italy; António Tânger Corrêa, Portugal; Hermann Tertsch, Spain; Pierre-Romain Thionnet, France; Harald Vilimsky, Austria	Sergey Lagodinsky, Germany; Hannah Neumann, Germany; Leoluca Orlando, Italy; Nela Riehl, Germany; Mounir Satouri, France; Villy Søvndal, Denmark	Marc Botenga, Belgium; Danilo Della Valle, Italy; Özlem Demirel, Germany; Giorgos Georgiou, Cyprus; Rima Hassan, France	Petr Bystron, Germany; Alexander Sell, Germany; Stanislav Stoyanov, Bulgaria
Non-Inscrits			
Ľuboš Blaha, Slovakia; Grzegorz Braun, Poland; Kostas Papadakis, Greece			

==== Substitute members ====
Substitute members of the 10th Parliament (click “show” to expand)

The committee's substitute members are listed below.

European People's Party	Progressive Alliance of Socialists and Democrats	European Conservatives and Reformists	Renew Europe
Krzysztof Brejza, Poland; Jan Farský, Czechia; Andrzej Halicki, Poland; Mircea Hava, Romania; Manolis Kefalogiannis, Greece; Seán Kelly, Ireland; Eszter Lakos, Hungary; Miriam Lexmann, Slovakia; Gabriel Mato, Spain; Liudas Mažylis, Lithuania; Verena Mertens, Germany; Angelika Niebler, Germany; Nicolás Pascual de la Parte, Spain; Ana Miguel Pedro, Portugal; Massimiliano Salini, Italy; Sven Simon, Germany; Alice Teodorescu Måwe, Sweden; Ingeborg ter Laak, Netherlands; Matej Tonin, Slovenia; Isabel Wiseler-Lima, Luxembourg; Milan Zver, Slovenia	Francisco Assis, Portugal; Laura Ballarín Cereza, Spain; Vasile Dîncu, Romania; Nikolas Farantouris, Greece; Raphaël Glucksmann, France; Sandra Gómez López, Spain; Giorgio Gori, Italy; Evin Incir, Sweden; Javi López, Spain; Yannis Maniatis, Greece; Alessandra Moretti, Italy; Matjaž Nemec, Slovenia; Marco Tarquinio, Italy; Mihai Tudose, Romania; Kathleen Van Brempt, Belgium	Stephen Nikola Bartulica, Croatia; Michał Dworczyk, Poland; Carlo Fidanza, Italy; Emmanouil Fragkos, Greece; Małgorzata Gosiewska, Poland; Reinis Pozņaks, Latvia; Șerban Dimitrie Sturdza, Romania; Claudiu-Richard Târziu, Romania; Ivaylo Valchev, Bulgaria	Malik Azmani, Netherlands; Engin Eroglu, Germany; Christophe Grudler, France; Michał Kobosko, Poland; Ilhan Kyuchyuk, Bulgaria; Pina Picierno, Italy; Marjan Šarec, Slovenia; Lucia Yar, Slovakia
Patriots for Europe	Greens–European Free Alliance	The Left	Europe of Sovereign Nations
Susanna Ceccardi, Italy; Viktória Ferenc, Hungary; Vilis Krištopans, Latvia; András László, Hungary; Afroditi Latinopoulou, Greece; Jorge Martín Frías, Spain; Georg Mayer, Austria; Julie Rechagneux, France; Matthieu Valet, France	Jaume Asens Llodrà, Spain; Ville Niinistö, Finland; Vladimir Prebilič, Slovenia; Diana Riba i Giner, Spain; Tineke Strik, Netherlands; Thomas Waitz, Austria	Pernando Barrena Arza, Spain; Merja Kyllönen, Finland; Irene Montero, Spain; Ilaria Salis, Italy; Jonas Sjöstedt, Sweden	Tomasz Froelich, Germany; Hans Neuhoff, Germany; Petar Volgin, Bulgaria
Non-Inscrits			
Ruth Firmenich, Germany; Martin Sonneborn, Germany; Michael von der Schulenburg, Germany			

== Research support ==
The committee is supported by the European Parliament's research services and the Policy Department for External Relations. These services provide studies, briefings and analyses on foreign policy, enlargement, international security, sanctions, democracy support, human rights and the Union's relations with individual countries and regions.

Research prepared for the committee is published through Parliament's supporting-analyses database and the European Parliament Think Tank.

== See also ==
- Common Foreign and Security Policy
- Common Security and Defence Policy
- European External Action Service
- High Representative of the Union for Foreign Affairs and Security Policy
- Foreign Affairs Council
- European Union enlargement
- European Neighbourhood Policy
- European Parliament Subcommittee on Human Rights
- European Parliament Committee on Security and Defence
