= European Parliament Subcommittee on Human Rights =

European Parliament subcommittee

Subcommittee on Human Rights
- Abbreviation: DROI
- Type: Subcommittee
- Legislature: European Parliament
- Parliamentary term: 10th European Parliament
- Parent body: Committee on Foreign Affairs
- Chair: Mounir Satouri; Greens/EFA, France
- Vice-Chairs: Marta Temido (S&D); Łukasz Kohut (EPP); Isabel Serra Sánchez (The Left); Arkadiusz Mularczyk (ECR)
- Members: 30
- Jurisdiction: Human rights, democracy, rule of law and the human-rights dimension of the European Union's external action
- Website: Official website

The Subcommittee on Human Rights (DROI) is a subcommittee of the Committee on Foreign Affairs of the European Parliament. It monitors and promotes respect for human rights, democracy and the rule of law in the European Union's external policies and relations with third countries.

The subcommittee examines human-rights situations around the world, maintains contacts with civil-society organisations and human-rights defenders and contributes to Parliament's resolutions, reports, missions and hearings on human-rights issues.

== Responsibilities ==
DROI is responsible for the human-rights and democracy aspects of the Union's external policy. Its work forms part of the remit of the Committee on Foreign Affairs and contributes to Parliament's scrutiny of the Common Foreign and Security Policy and the activities of the European External Action Service.

Its activities include:

- monitoring respect for human rights, democracy and the rule of law in third countries;
- assessing the human-rights impact of EU foreign, security, migration, development and trade policies;
- holding hearings and exchanges of views with human-rights defenders, civil-society organisations, international organisations and government representatives;
- contributing to Parliament's urgency resolutions on breaches of human rights, democracy and the rule of law;
- preparing reports and recommendations on human-rights policy;
- following the implementation of EU human-rights sanctions and other restrictive measures;
- examining the work of EU delegations and special representatives on human-rights issues;
- conducting fact-finding missions and monitoring trials and elections where relevant; and
- contributing to Parliament's work on the Sakharov Prize.

== Parliamentary work ==
The subcommittee holds regular exchanges with the High Representative of the Union for Foreign Affairs and Security Policy, the EU Special Representative for Human Rights, representatives of the United Nations, the Council of Europe and other international organisations.

DROI also follows the implementation of the EU Action Plan on Human Rights and Democracy and examines whether the Union's external policies are consistent with international human-rights law. Its work frequently involves cooperation with the Committee on Foreign Affairs, the Committee on Development and the Committee on International Trade.

== Urgency resolutions and human-rights defenders ==
DROI contributes to Parliament's resolutions on cases of breaches of human rights, democracy and the rule of law. These resolutions are normally debated and voted during plenary sessions and may address political prisoners, attacks on journalists, repression of civil society, discrimination, conflict-related abuses and restrictions on fundamental freedoms.

The subcommittee also provides a parliamentary forum for human-rights defenders and non-governmental organisations. Public hearings and exchanges of views allow witnesses to present evidence directly to Members of the European Parliament.

== Missions and external relations ==
The subcommittee may send delegations to third countries to assess human-rights conditions and meet government representatives, opposition groups, civil-society organisations and international bodies. Findings from these missions may inform parliamentary reports, resolutions and recommendations.

DROI also monitors the human-rights clauses contained in EU agreements with third countries and the use of human-rights dialogues and consultations as instruments of external policy.

== History ==
The modern subcommittee was established at the beginning of the sixth parliamentary term in 2004. It succeeded earlier parliamentary structures dealing with human rights and external affairs.

On 22 March 2021, the Chinese government imposed sanctions on the subcommittee and several Members of the European Parliament following EU sanctions related to human-rights abuses in Xinjiang. China lifted the sanctions against the Parliament and its members in April 2025.

== Chairs ==
Name	Political group	Member state	Took office	Left office
Hélène Flautre	Greens/EFA	France	1 September 2004	13 July 2009
Heidi Hautala	Greens/EFA	Finland	20 July 2009	21 June 2011
Barbara Lochbihler	Greens/EFA	Germany	15 September 2011	30 June 2014
Elena Valenciano	S&D	Spain	7 July 2014	18 January 2017
Antonio Panzeri	S&D	Italy	25 January 2017	1 July 2019
Marie Arena	S&D	Belgium	10 July 2019	10 January 2023
Udo Bullmann	S&D	Germany	6 February 2023	15 July 2024
Mounir Satouri	Greens/EFA	France	23 July 2024	Incumbent

== Members ==
=== 10th Parliament, 2024–2029 ===
The subcommittee currently has 30 full members.

European People's Party	Progressive Alliance of Socialists and Democrats	European Conservatives and Reformists	Renew Europe
Łukasz Kohut, Poland, Vice-Chair; Mircea Hava, Romania; Rasa Juknevičienė, Lithuania; Ondřej Kolář, Czechia; Reinhold Lopatka, Austria; Antonio López-Istúriz White, Spain; Liudas Mažylis, Lithuania; Isabel Wiseler-Lima, Luxembourg	Marta Temido, Portugal, Vice-Chair; Francisco Assis, Portugal; Robert Biedroń, Poland; Chloé Ridel, France; Nacho Sánchez Amor, Spain; Marco Tarquinio, Italy	Arkadiusz Mularczyk, Poland, Vice-Chair; Emmanouil Fragkos, Greece; Małgorzata Gosiewska, Poland	Petras Auštrevičius, Lithuania; Bernard Guetta, France; Urmas Paet, Estonia
Patriots for Europe	Greens–European Free Alliance	The Left	Europe of Sovereign Nations
András László, Hungary; Jorge Martín Frías, Spain; Silvia Sardone, Italy; Matthieu Valet, France	Mounir Satouri, France, Chair; Catarina Vieira, Netherlands	Isabel Serra Sánchez, Spain, Vice-Chair; Rima Hassan, France	Tomasz Froelich, Germany
Non-Inscrits			
Ľuboš Blaha, Slovakia			

==== Substitute members ====
Substitute members of the 10th Parliament (click “show” to expand)

European People's Party	Progressive Alliance of Socialists and Democrats	European Conservatives and Reformists	Renew Europe
Sebastião Bugalho, Portugal; Alice Teodorescu Måwe, Sweden; Adrián Vázquez Lázara, Spain	Sandra Gómez López, Spain; Hana Jalloul Muro, Spain; Ștefan Mușoiu, Romania; Maria Noichl, Germany; Aodhán Ó Ríordáin, Ireland	Mariusz Kamiński, Poland; Bert-Jan Ruissen, Netherlands; Waldemar Tomaszewski, Lithuania	Barry Andrews, Ireland; Jan-Christoph Oetjen, Germany
Patriots for Europe	Greens–European Free Alliance	The Left	Europe of Sovereign Nations
Mieke Andriese, Netherlands; Thierry Mariani, France; Tiago Moreira de Sá, Portugal	Jaume Asens Llodrà, Spain; Hannah Neumann, Germany	Danilo Della Valle, Italy; Ilaria Salis, Italy	Marc Jongen, Germany
Non-Inscrits			
Ruth Firmenich, Germany			

== Research support ==
The subcommittee is supported by the European Parliament's Policy Department for External Relations and its research services. These provide studies and briefings on human-rights situations, democracy, the rule of law, sanctions, human-rights defenders and the human-rights dimension of EU external policies.

== See also ==
- Human rights in Europe
- European Union Special Representative for Human Rights
- Sakharov Prize
- European Parliament Committee on Foreign Affairs
- European Parliament Committee on Development
- European Parliament Committee on International Trade
- European External Action Service
- EU Global Human Rights Sanctions Regime
