= European Parliament Committee on Security and Defence =

European Parliament committee

Committee on Security and Defence
- Abbreviation: SEDE
- Type: Standing committee
- Legislature: European Parliament
- Parliamentary term: 10th European Parliament
- Chair: Marie-Agnes Strack-Zimmermann; Renew, Germany
- Vice-Chairs: Christophe Gomart (EPP); Mihai Tudose (S&D); Michał Dworczyk (ECR); Riho Terras (EPP)
- Members: 43
- Political composition: EPP: 11 · S&D: 8 · ECR: 5 · Renew: 5 · PfE: 5 · Greens/EFA: 3 · The Left: 3 · ESN: 1 · NI: 2
- Established: 2004 as a subcommittee; 2025 as a standing committee
- Jurisdiction: Common Security and Defence Policy, military and civilian missions, defence capabilities, defence industry, hybrid threats and relations with NATO
- Counterpart: Foreign Affairs Council
- Website: Official website

The Committee on Security and Defence (SEDE) is a standing committee of the European Parliament. It is responsible for parliamentary work on the Common Security and Defence Policy, including military and civilian missions and operations, European defence capabilities, defence-industrial cooperation, military mobility, resilience, hybrid threats and relations with strategic partners such as NATO.

SEDE was established in 2004 as a subcommittee of the Committee on Foreign Affairs. On 18 December 2024, Parliament decided to transform it into a separate standing committee, with the change taking effect in January 2025.

== Responsibilities ==
The committee is responsible for matters relating to the Common Security and Defence Policy and the development of European security and defence capabilities. It scrutinises the implementation of the Union's security and defence strategies, the conduct of military and civilian missions and the work of relevant EU bodies and agencies.

Its remit includes:

- the Common Security and Defence Policy;
- EU military and civilian missions and operations;
- defence capabilities, military mobility and joint procurement;
- the European defence technological and industrial base;
- implementation of the Strategic Compass for Security and Defence;
- hybrid threats, cyber defence, critical-infrastructure protection and military preparedness;
- relations with NATO and other strategic partners;
- the European Defence Agency, the European Union Institute for Security Studies and the European Union Satellite Centre;
- security and defence aspects of the Union's external-action budget; and
- parliamentary oversight of security and defence initiatives of the European Commission and the European External Action Service.

The committee also examines proposals concerning the European defence industry, support for Ukraine, defence investment, readiness and the implementation of EU security commitments.

== History ==
The body was created in 2004 as the Subcommittee on Security and Defence under the Committee on Foreign Affairs. Its establishment reflected the growing importance of the European Security and Defence Policy, later renamed the Common Security and Defence Policy.

During its period as a subcommittee, SEDE developed into Parliament's principal forum for scrutiny of military and civilian crisis-management missions, defence cooperation, security threats and relations with NATO. Following the deterioration of Europe's security environment after Russia's full-scale invasion of Ukraine, Parliament decided in December 2024 to elevate SEDE to the status of a standing committee.

The new standing committee held its constitutive meeting in January 2025. Marie-Agnes Strack-Zimmermann, who had chaired the former subcommittee since July 2024, was elected chair of the standing committee.

== Parliamentary scrutiny ==
SEDE holds exchanges of views with the High Representative of the Union for Foreign Affairs and Security Policy, defence ministers, senior military officials, NATO representatives, EU mission commanders and the heads of EU agencies. It prepares reports and recommendations on defence policy and monitors the implementation of EU missions and operations.

The committee also examines the defence dimensions of EU funding instruments and industrial programmes. These include measures intended to strengthen joint procurement, increase ammunition and equipment production, improve military mobility and reinforce the resilience of European defence supply chains.

== Chairs ==
The following table lists the chairs of SEDE, including the period when it operated as a subcommittee.

Name	Political group	Member state	Took office	Left office
Karl von Wogau	EPP–ED	Germany	2004	2009
Arnaud Danjean	EPP	France	2009	2014
Anna Fotyga	ECR	Poland	2014	2019
Nathalie Loiseau	Renew Europe	France	2019	2024
Marie-Agnes Strack-Zimmermann	Renew Europe	Germany	2024	Incumbent

== Members ==
=== 10th Parliament, 2024–2029 ===
The committee currently has 43 full members. Its current composition is shown below, with the chair and vice-chairs indicated in italics.

European People's Party	Progressive Alliance of Socialists and Democrats	European Conservatives and Reformists	Renew Europe
Christophe Gomart, France, Vice-Chair; Riho Terras, Estonia, Vice-Chair; Wouter Beke, Belgium; Salvatore De Meo, Italy; Niclas Herbst, Germany; Vangelis Meimarakis, Greece; Andrey Novakov, Bulgaria; Nicolás Pascual de la Parte, Spain; Michał Szczerba, Poland; Alice Teodorescu Måwe, Sweden; Pekka Toveri, Finland	Mihai Tudose, Romania, Vice-Chair; Tobias Cremer, Germany; Elio Di Rupo, Belgium; Raphaël Glucksmann, France; Javi López, Spain; Costas Mavrides, Cyprus; Ana Catarina Mendes, Portugal; Sven Mikser, Estonia	Michał Dworczyk, Poland, Vice-Chair; Elena Donazzan, Italy; Alberico Gambino, Italy; Reinis Pozņaks, Latvia; Alexandr Vondra, Czechia	Marie-Agnes Strack-Zimmermann, Germany, Chair; Petras Auštrevičius, Lithuania; Nathalie Loiseau, France; Marjan Šarec, Slovenia; Lucia Yar, Slovakia
Patriots for Europe	Greens–European Free Alliance	The Left	Europe of Sovereign Nations
Rachel Blom, Netherlands; György Hölvényi, Hungary; Jaroslava Pokorná Jermanová, Czechia; Petra Steger, Austria; Pierre-Romain Thionnet, France	Hannah Neumann, Germany; Mārtiņš Staķis, Latvia; Reinier van Lanschot, Netherlands	Marc Botenga, Belgium; Özlem Demirel, Germany; Merja Kyllönen, Finland	Hans Neuhoff, Germany
Non-Inscrits			
Kostas Papadakis, Greece; Michael von der Schulenburg, Germany			

==== Substitute members ====
Substitute members of the 10th Parliament (click “show” to expand)

The committee's substitute members are listed below.

European People's Party	Progressive Alliance of Socialists and Democrats	European Conservatives and Reformists	Renew Europe
Michael Gahler, Germany; Rasa Juknevičienė, Lithuania; Eszter Lakos, Hungary; Angelika Niebler, Germany; Hélder Sousa Silva, Portugal; Matej Tonin, Slovenia; Loránt Vincze, Romania; Marta Wcisło, Poland; Isabel Wiseler-Lima, Luxembourg; Juan Ignacio Zoido Álvarez, Spain; Željana Zovko, Croatia	Lucia Annunziata, Italy; José Cepeda, Spain; Vasile Dîncu, Romania; André Franqueira Rodrigues, Portugal; Giannis Maniatis, Greece; Tonino Picula, Croatia; Thijs Reuten, Netherlands; Kristian Vigenin, Bulgaria	Adam Bielan, Poland; Assita Kanko, Belgium; Marion Maréchal, France; Claudiu-Richard Târziu, Romania; Cristian Terheș, Romania	Engin Eroglu, Germany; Bart Groothuis, Netherlands; Christophe Grudler, France; Urmas Paet, Estonia; Hilde Vautmans, Belgium
Patriots for Europe	Greens–European Free Alliance	The Left	Europe of Sovereign Nations
Christophe Bay, France; Jorge Buxadé Villalba, Spain; Matthieu Valet, France; Harald Vilimsky, Austria	Ville Niinistö, Finland; Terry Reintke, Germany; Villy Søvndal, Denmark	Giuseppe Antoci, Italy; Lynn Boylan, Ireland; Marina Mesure, France	Roberto Vannacci, Italy
Non-Inscrits			
Ruth Firmenich, Germany; Judita Laššáková, Slovakia			

== Research support ==
The committee is supported by the European Parliament's research services and the Policy Department for External Relations. These services provide studies, briefings and analyses on the Common Security and Defence Policy, defence capabilities, military mobility, defence industry, cyber defence, hybrid threats, NATO and EU missions and operations.

Research prepared for the committee is published through Parliament's supporting-analyses database and the European Parliament Think Tank.

== See also ==
- Common Security and Defence Policy
- Common Foreign and Security Policy
- Strategic Compass for Security and Defence
- European Defence Agency
- European Union Military Staff
- European Union Military Committee
- European Union Institute for Security Studies
- European Union Satellite Centre
- NATO
- European Parliament Committee on Foreign Affairs
