= Neuhoff =

Neuhoff is a surname. Notable people with the surname include:

- Éric Neuhoff (born 1956), French novelist and journalist
- Hans Neuhoff (born 1959), German cultural sociologist, musicologist, and politician
