= Michael Gahler =

German diplomat and politician (born 1960)

Michael Gahler MEP
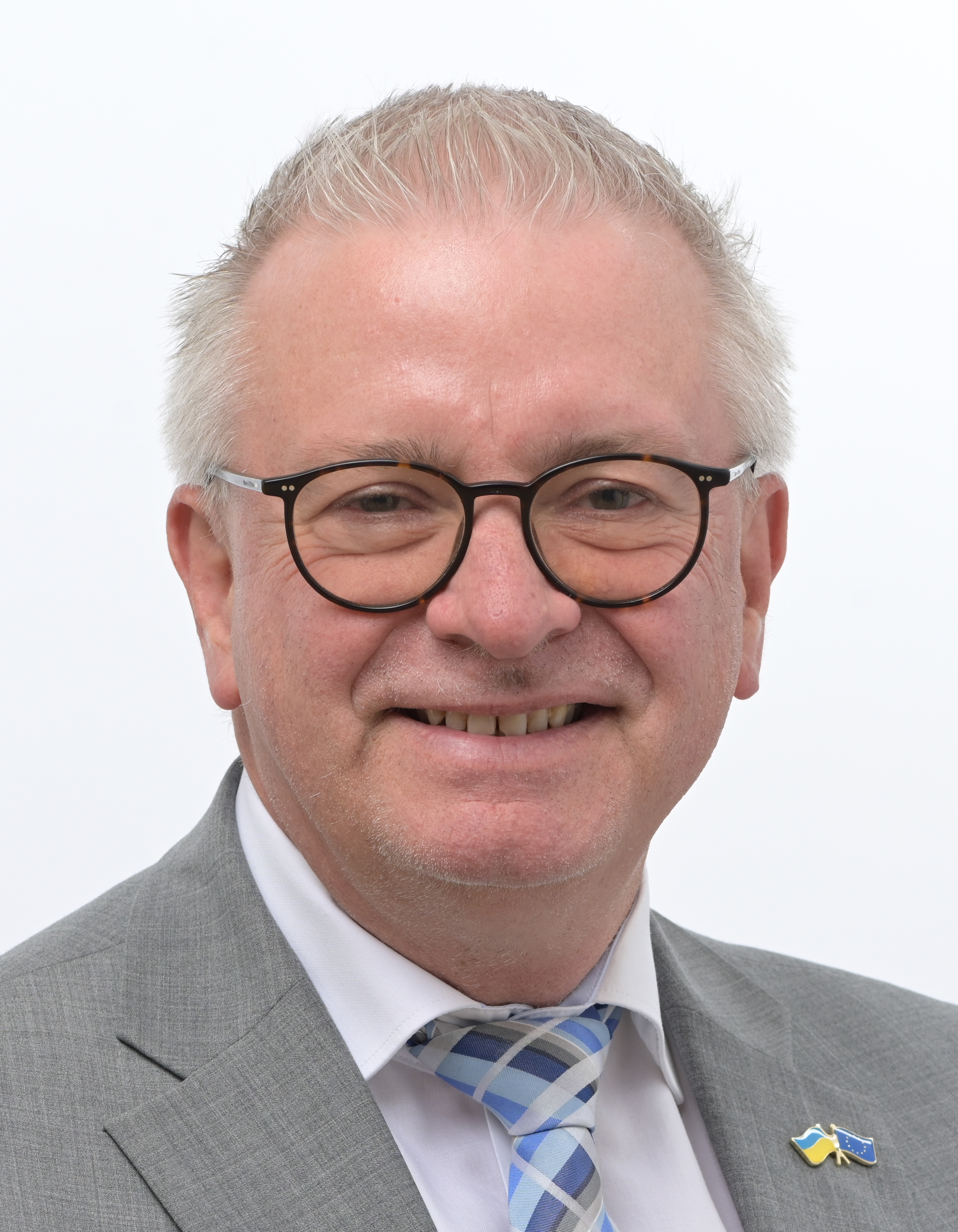

Member of the European Parliament
- Incumbent
- Assumed office 1 July 1999
- Constituency: Germany

Personal details
- Born: 22 April 1960 (age 66) Frankfurt, West Germany
- Party: German: Christian Democratic Union; EU: European People's Party
- Education: University of Vienna

Heinz Michael Gahler (born 22 April 1960) is a German diplomat and politician who has been serving as a Member of the European Parliament (MEP) since the 1999 election. He is a member of the Christian Democratic Union, part of the European People's Party.

== Education and early career ==
Gahler studied in Mainz and Dijon (1981–87) before training as a lawyer. He joined the Federal Foreign Office in 1990, where he served under ministers Hans-Dietrich Genscher, Klaus Kinkel and Joschka Fischer. While in the diplomatic service, he worked on international environmental policy (1991–93) and Germany's bilateral relations with the Baltic states and the Council of the Baltic Sea States. Between 1993 and 1995, he was seconded to work for the CDU party headquarters in Bonn.

== Political career ==
Gahler has been a politician since 1986, when he won a seat on the city council of Hattersheim.

=== Member of the European Parliament, 1999–present ===
Gahler was elected to the European Parliament in the 1999 elections.

Gahler is vice-president of the Committee on Foreign Affairs. In this capacity, he is also a member the Democracy Support and Election Coordination Group (DEG), which oversees the Parliament's election observation missions. In addition, he serves on the Subcommittee on Human Rights.

In addition to his committee assignments, Gahler is a member of the Parliament's delegations to the ACP–EU Joint Parliamentary Assembly and the one for relations with Iran. During his first term in parliament, he also served as his parliamentary group's rapporteur on Iran. In 2014, he was elected chairman of the delegation for relations with the Pan-African Parliament.

Gahler is also a member of the Democracy Support and Election Coordination Group (DEG), which oversees the Parliament's election observation missions. He headed the EU Election Observation Mission during the 2011 election for a constituent assembly, the first vote in after the Tunisian revolution. He later led the EU-Election Observer Mission for the general election in Pakistan in 2013.

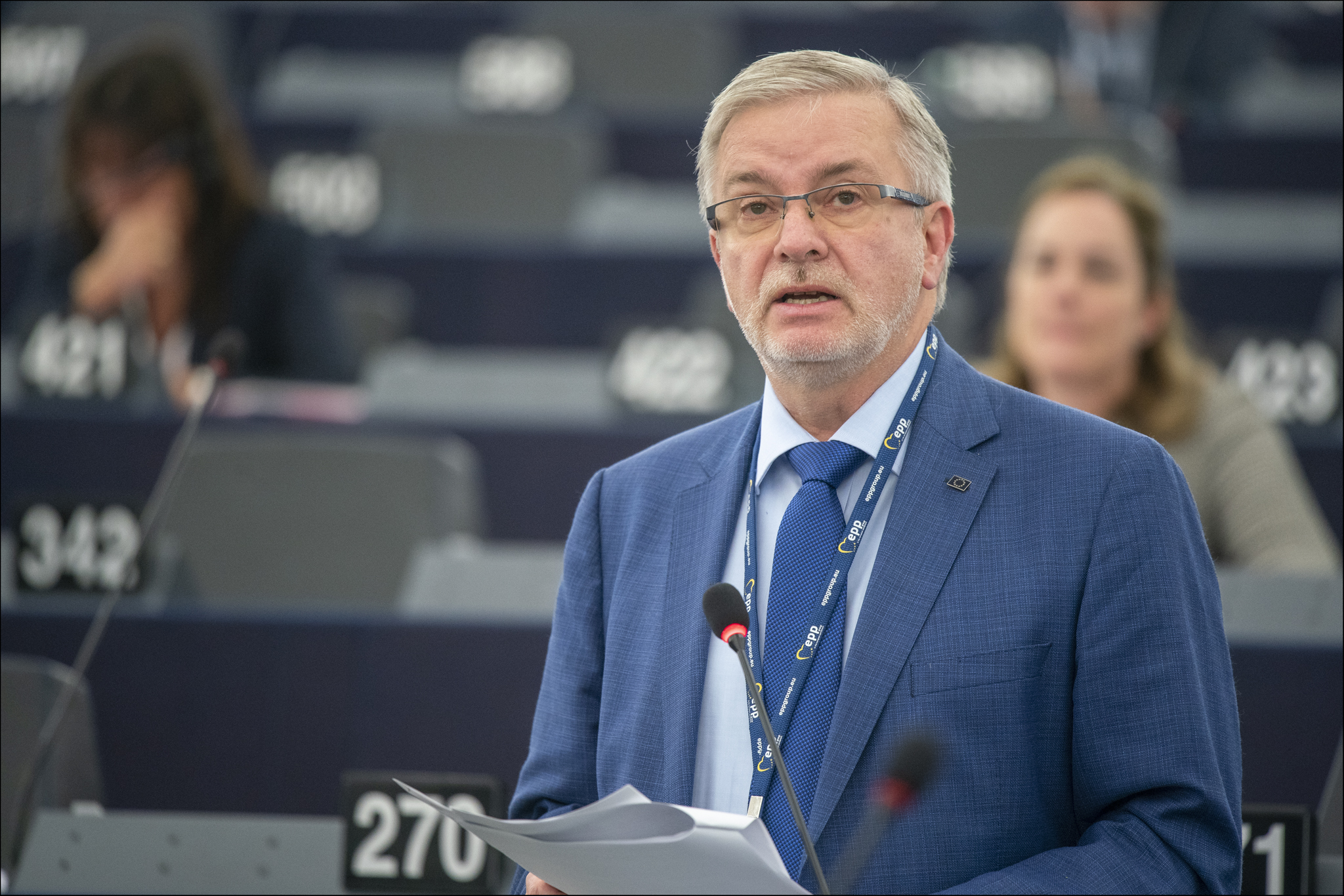
Gahler in the European Parliament (2019)

Gahler serves as rapporteur on Commission's communication on defence and as a member of the High-level Group of Personalities on Defence Research chaired by Elżbieta Bieńkowska. In addition, he is as a member of the European Parliament's Sky and Space Intergroup (SSI).

On 22 March 2021, he was sanctioned by the Chinese government after the European Union imposed sanctions on China over Xinjiang. The sanctions were lifted by China in April 2025 following negotiations with European Parliament President Roberta Metsola.

== Other activities ==
- Berlin Security Conference, Member of the Advisory Board
- Arctic Forum Foundation, Member of the Advisory Council
- EastWest Institute, Member of the Parliamentarians Network for Conflict Prevention
- Kangaroo Group, Chairman
- Robert Schuman Foundation, Member of the Board
- Robert Schuman Institute Budapest, Member of the Board
- Konrad Adenauer Foundation, Member

== Political positions ==
Gahler is a signatory of the Prague Declaration on European Conscience and Communism.

In a joint letter initiated by Norbert Röttgen and Anthony Gonzalez ahead of the 47th G7 summit in 2021, Gahler joined some 70 legislators from Europe, the US and Japan in calling upon their leaders to take a tough stance on China and to "avoid becoming dependent" on the country for technology including artificial intelligence and 5G.

Gahler also chairs the European Parliament's Taiwan Friendship Group promoting the EU-Taiwan relationship.

In a joint letter with 15 other MEPs from various political groups, Gahler urged the High Representative of the Union for Foreign Affairs and Security Policy Josep Borrell in early 2021 to replace the European Union's ambassador to Cuba for allegedly siding with the country's Communist leadership.

== See also ==
- http://www.michael-gahler.de
