= Tobias Cremer =

German politician (born 1992)

Tobias Cremer MEP
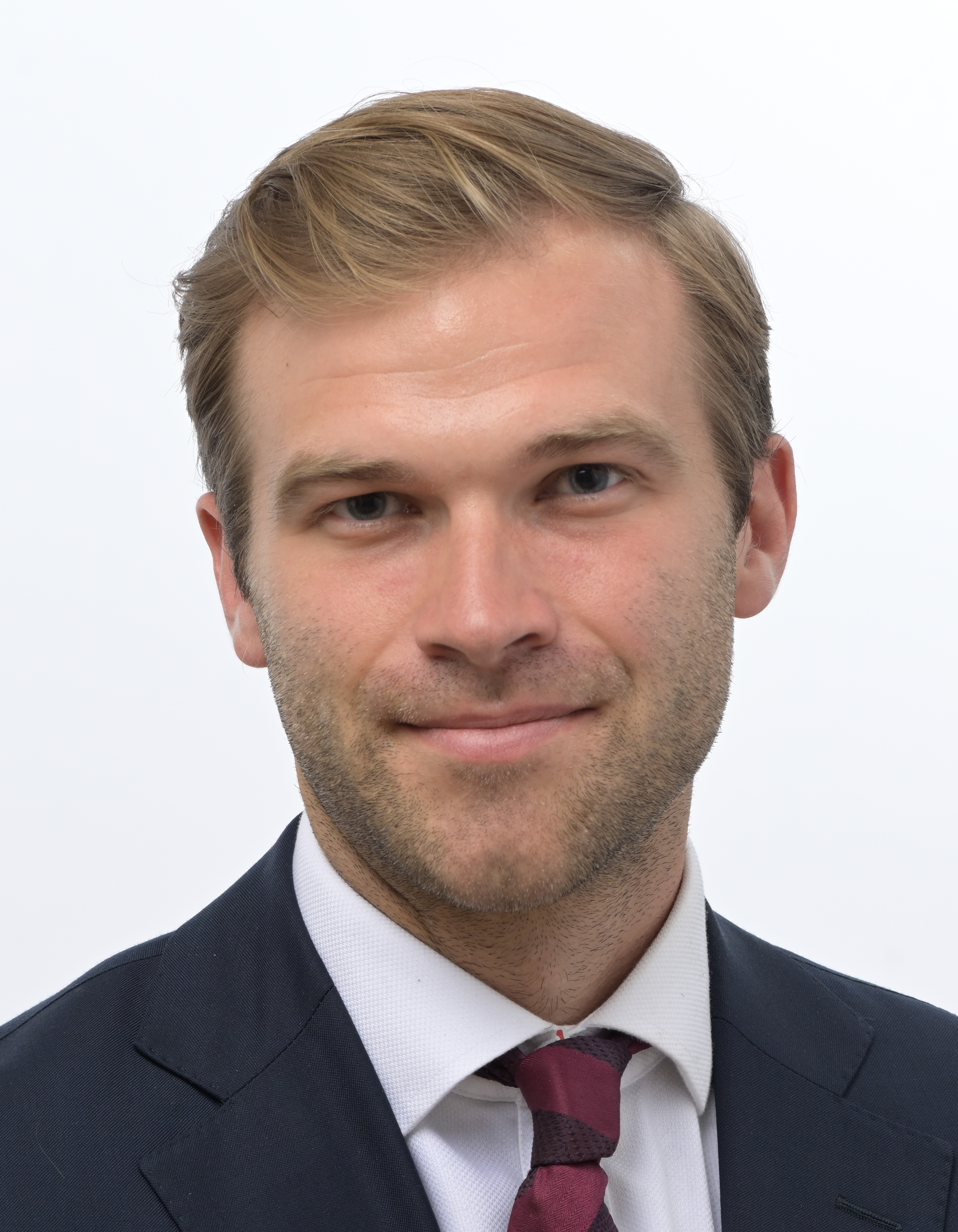
- Official portrait, 2024

Member of the European Parliament for Germany
- Incumbent
- Assumed office 16 July 2024

Personal details
- Born: 30 June 1992 (age 34) Bochum, Germany
- Party: Social Democratic Party of Germany (since 2006)
- Education: Sciences Po (BA); University of Cambridge (MPhil, PhD); Harvard University (MPP)

Tobias Cremer (born 30 June 1992) is a German politician of the Social Democratic Party (SPD) who has been serving as a Member of the European Parliament (MEP) since the 2024 European Parliament election.

== Early life and education ==
Cremer was born on 30 June 1992 in Bochum, North Rhine-Westphalia. He attended the Neues Gymnasium Bochum until 2011. He earned a bachelor's degree in political science, economics, and philosophy from Sciences Po in 2014, followed by a master’s degree in political science and international studies at the University of Cambridge in 2015 as a scholarship recipient from the German Academic Scholarship Foundation.

In 2017, he completed a Master of Public Policy at the Harvard Kennedy School as a McCloy Scholar. He received his PhD in political science and international relations from the University of Cambridge in 2021 as an Economic and Social Research Council scholar.

Cremer worked as a Junior Research Fellow in Religion and the Frontier Challenges at Pembroke College Oxford from 2020 to 2022. He later joined the Federal Foreign Office, serving as an attaché and later Desk Officer of the Baltic Region and Northern Europe Department until 2024.

== Political career ==
Cremer joined the Social Democratic Party (SPD) in 2006, at the age of fourteen. He served as Deputy Chair of Young Socialists Bochum from 2007 to 2008, assistant in the constituency office of an SPD Member of the Bundestag in 2013, and member of the executive of Bochum SPD since 2024.

In the 2024 European elections, Cremer was elected to the European Parliament as 14th place on the SPD list.

In parliament, Cremer has since been serving on the Committee on Foreign Affairs and the Subcommittee on Security and Defence. In addition to his committee assignments, he is part of the parliament’s delegations to the NATO Parliamentary Assembly and for relations with the United States.

== Memberships ==
- Member of ver.di trade union
- Member of Europa-Union Germany
- Member of the Arbeiterwohlfahrt (German workers’ welfare organisation)
- Member of Naturfreunde Bochum (Friends of Nature Bochum)
- Member of the Protestant parish of Altenbochum-Laer
