= Nacho Sánchez Amor =

Spanish politician (born 1960)

José Ignacio Sánchez Amor MEP
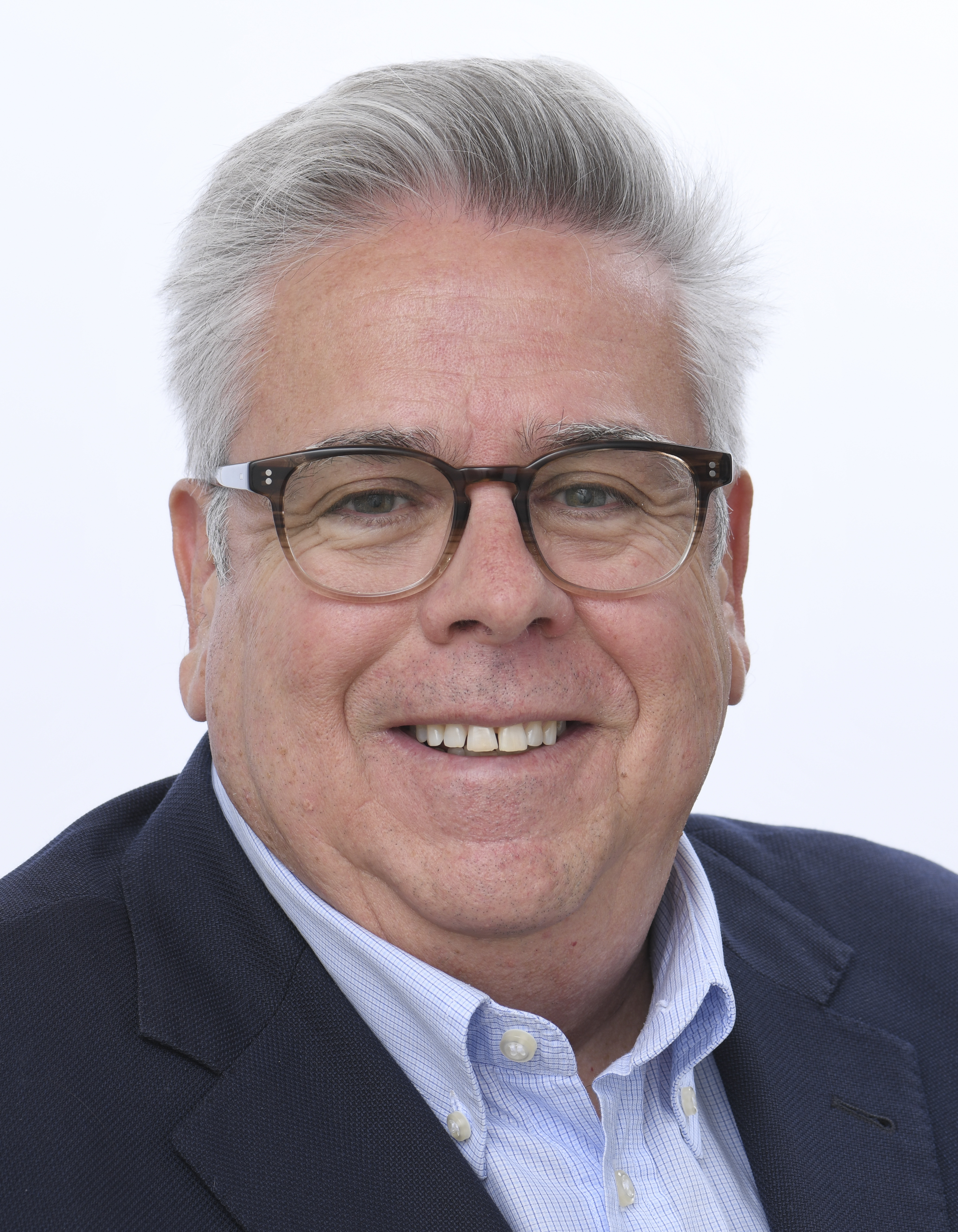

Member of the European Parliament for Spain
- Incumbent
- Assumed office 2 July 2019

Personal details
- Born: 15 May 1960 (age 66) Cáceres, Spain
- Party: People's Socialist Party (1977–1978); Spanish Socialist Workers' Party (since 1978)

José Ignacio "Nacho" Sánchez Amor (Spanish: [ˈnatʃo ˈsaɲtʃeθ aˈmoɾ]; born 1960) is a Spanish politician who was elected as a Member of the European Parliament in 2019.

== Early life and education ==
Born on 15 May 1960 in Cáceres, he was raised in Jaraíz de la Vera. He moved to Madrid and became a member of the People's Socialist Party (PSP) in 1977, attending the April 1978 party congress in Torrelodones in which the merge with the Spanish Socialist Workers' Party (PSOE) was decided. He dropped studies in medicine and switched to law, earning a licentiate degree in Law at the Complutense University of Madrid (UCM). He was a postgraduate scholar at the Centro de Estudios Constitucionales (CEC).

== Political career ==
=== Career in state politics ===
Having joined the Corps of attorneys of the regional government of Extremadura in 1986, Sánchez Amor served as Chief of Staff of Juan Carlos Rodríguez Ibarra, the regional president of Extremadura, between 1996 and 2004.

Sánchez Amor was appointed as regional Vice-President in 2004, serving until 2007. He ran as candidate in the 2007 Extremadura regional election and, elected, he became the Spokesperson of the Socialist Parliamentary Group in the Assembly of Extremadura.

=== Career in national politics ===
Sánchez Amor became a member of the Congress of Deputies in the 2011 elections and was re-elected at the 2015 and 2016 elections.

In addition to his parliamentary work, Sánchez Amor was a member of the Spanish delegation to the Parliamentary Assembly of the Organization for Security and Co-operation in Europe, where he chaired the Committee on Democracy, Human Rights and Humanitarian Questions. In this capacity, he led short-term OSCE observer missions during the 2015 general election in Turkey; the 2016 parliamentary elections in Georgia; and the 2018 Turkish presidential election.

On June 23, 2018 Minister Meritxell Batet appointed him as Secretary of State for Territorial Policy. He served as the 11th Secretary of State until June 29, 2019.

=== Member of the European Parliament, 2019–present ===
In 2019, Sánchez Amor left his government office to run in the EU elections. He was 12th one the PSOE list for the 2019 European Parliament election in Spain and became an MEP.

In parliament, Sánchez Amor has since been serving on the Committee on Foreign Affairs and its Subcommittee on Human Rights. In this capacity, he has been the parliament's rapporteur on relations with Turkey.

In addition to his committee assignments, Sánchez Amor is part of the parliament's delegations to the EU-Turkey Joint Parliamentary Committee and to the Euronest Parliamentary Assembly. He also led a European Union observer mission to the 2019 general elections in Mozambique. He is a member of the European Parliament Intergroup on LGBT Rights, the European Parliament Intergroup on Disability. and the Spinelli Group.
