= Christophe Grudler =

French politician and journalist (born 1965)

Christophe Grudler MEP
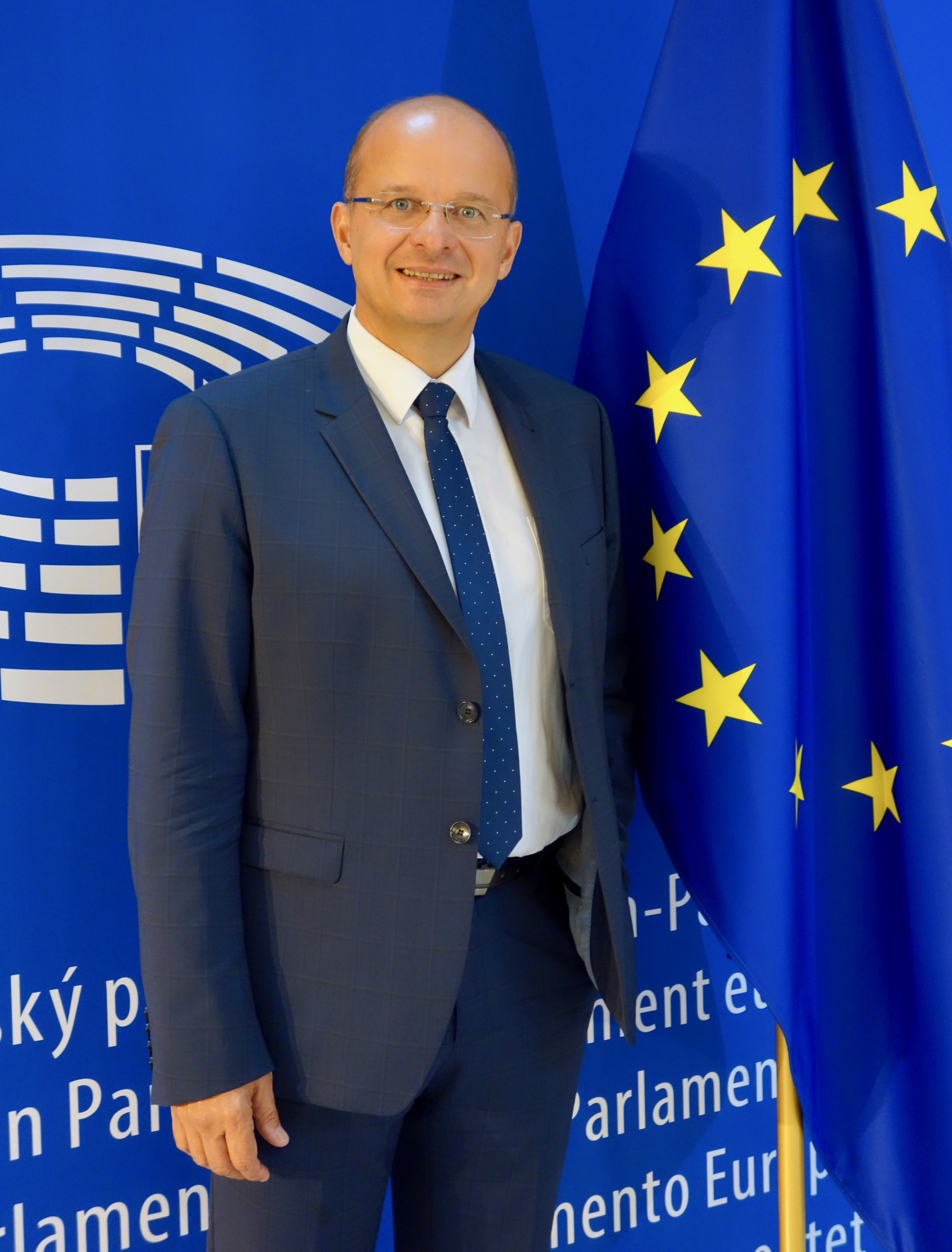

Member of the European Parliament for France
- Incumbent
- Assumed office 2 July 2019

Personal details
- Born: 9 April 1965 (age 61) Belfort, France
- Party: MoDem; EU: European Democratic Party Renew Europe
- Education: University of Strasbourg
- Occupation: Historian journalist

Christophe Grudler (born 9 April 1965) is a French politician and a journalist who has been serving as a Member of the European Parliament since the 2019 elections. He was re-elected in 2024.

== Political career ==
Grudler has since been serving on the Committee on Industry, Research and Energy, on the Committee on Foreign Affairs, and the Subcommittee on Security and Defence.

In addition to his committee assignments, Grudler is part of the Parliament's delegation for Northern cooperation and for relations with Switzerland and Norway and to the EU-Iceland Joint Parliamentary Committee and the European Economic Area (EEA) Joint Parliamentary Committee. He is a member of the European Parliament Intergroup on Artificial Intelligence and Digital, the European Parliament Intergroup on Children’s Rights, the European Parliament Intergroup on Climate Change, Biodiversity and Sustainable Development, the European Parliament Intergroup on Fighting against Poverty, the European Parliament Intergroup on the Welfare and Conservation of Animals and the Spinelli Group.

== Political positions ==
In May 2021, Grudler joined a group of 39 mostly Green Party lawmakers from the European Parliament who in a letter urged the leaders of Germany, France and Italy not to support Arctic LNG 2, a $21 billion Russian Arctic liquefied natural gas (LNG) project, due to climate change concerns.
