= Hannah Neumann =

German politician (born 1984)

Hannah Neumann MEP
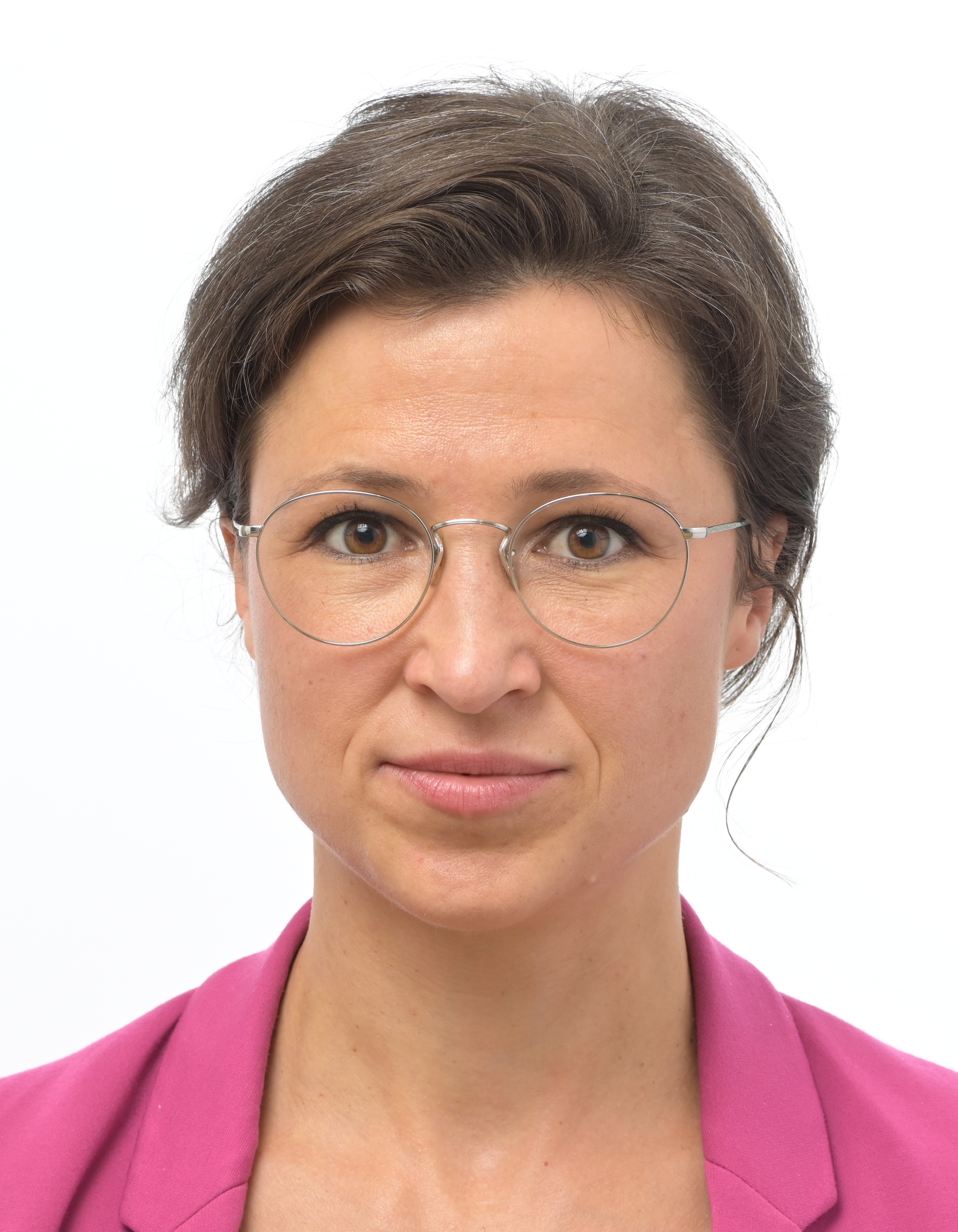

Member of the European Parliament for Germany
- Incumbent
- Assumed office 2 July 2019

Personal details
- Born: 3 April 1984 (age 42) Speyer, West Germany
- Party: German; Alliance 90/The Greens; EU; European Green Party
- Children: 3
- Education: Free University of Berlin; Technische Universität Ilmenau
- Occupation: Peace researcher, politician
- Website: hannahneumann.eu

Hannah Marie Neumann (born 3 April 1984) is a German politician of the Alliance 90/The Greens who has been serving as a Member of the European Parliament since 2019. She was re-elected in the 2024 European Parliament election.

In parliament, Neumann focuses on foreign policy and human rights. Since 2024, she has served as the Chair of the Delegation for relations with Iran.

== Early life and education ==
Neumann studied media studies at TU Ilmenau from 2002 until 2007 and political science and media studies at the Free University of Berlin from 2008 until 2012. During her studies, she spent a year abroad at Ateneo de Manila University in the Philippines from 2004 until 2005. She received her Doctorate in 2012 with a thesis on the peace process in the Philippines.

== Career ==
Prior to her election to the European Parliament, Neumann worked as a legislative assistant to Tom Koenigs (2013–2014) and as chief of staff to Omid Nouripour (2014–2016) in the German Bundestag. From 2018 until 2019, she was an associate fellow at the German Council on Foreign Relations (DGAP), focusing on arms exports and peace policy.

=== Member of the European Parliament, 2019–present ===
Neumann was first elected to the European Parliament in the 2019 European elections.

During her first term (2019–2024), she served on the Subcommittee on Human Rights (DROI) and the Subcommittee on Security and Defence (SEDE). She was also a substitute member of the Committee on Foreign Affairs (AFET). In 2022, she joined the Committee of Inquiry to investigate the use of Pegasus and equivalent surveillance spyware. From 2019 to 2024, Neumann chaired the Parliament's delegation for relations with the Arab Peninsula (D-ARP).

Following the 2021 German federal elections, Neumann was part of the Green Party's delegation in the foreign policy working group during the coalition negotiations, co-chaired by Heiko Maas, Omid Nouripour and Alexander Graf Lambsdorff.

==== Second term (2024–present) ====
Neumann was re-elected in the 2024 European Parliament election. In the Tenth European Parliament, she became the Chair of the Delegation for relations with Iran (D-IR), succeeding Cornelia Ernst. She continues to serve as a member of the Committee on Foreign Affairs (AFET) and the Subcommittee on Security and Defence (SEDE), while moving to a substitute role for the Delegation for relations with the Arab Peninsula.

In early 2025, Germany's Federal Office for the Protection of the Constitution found that Neumann's office had been targeted by a hacking campaign. According to Politico, the group thought to be behind the attack was a hacking collective associated with the Iranian Revolutionary Guard, known as APT42.

She is a member of the European Parliament Intergroup on Anti-Racism and Diversity, the European Parliament Intergroup on LGBT Rights and the European Parliament Intergroup on Anti-Corruption.

== Political positions ==
Hannah Neumann presenting herself in a video produced by Heinrich Böll Foundation/Green European Foundation.

Neumann advocates for a feminist foreign policy and stricter controls on arms exports. She has been a vocal critic of the Iranian government, particularly regarding its human rights violations and the persecution of minorities such as the Baháʼí community. She has campaigned for the inclusion of the Islamic Revolutionary Guard Corps (IRGC) on the EU terrorist list.

In May 2021, Neumann joined a group of 39 mostly Green Party lawmakers from the European Parliament who in a letter urged the leaders of Germany, France and Italy not to support Arctic LNG 2, a $21 billion Russian Arctic liquefied natural gas (LNG) project, due to climate change concerns.

== Other activities ==
- European Council on Foreign Relations (ECFR), Member of the Council (since 2023)
- German Council on Foreign Relations (DGAP), Member of the Presidium (since 2019)
- Berghof Foundation, Member of the Advisory Council
