= Javi López Fernández =

Spanish politician

Javi López Fernández MEP
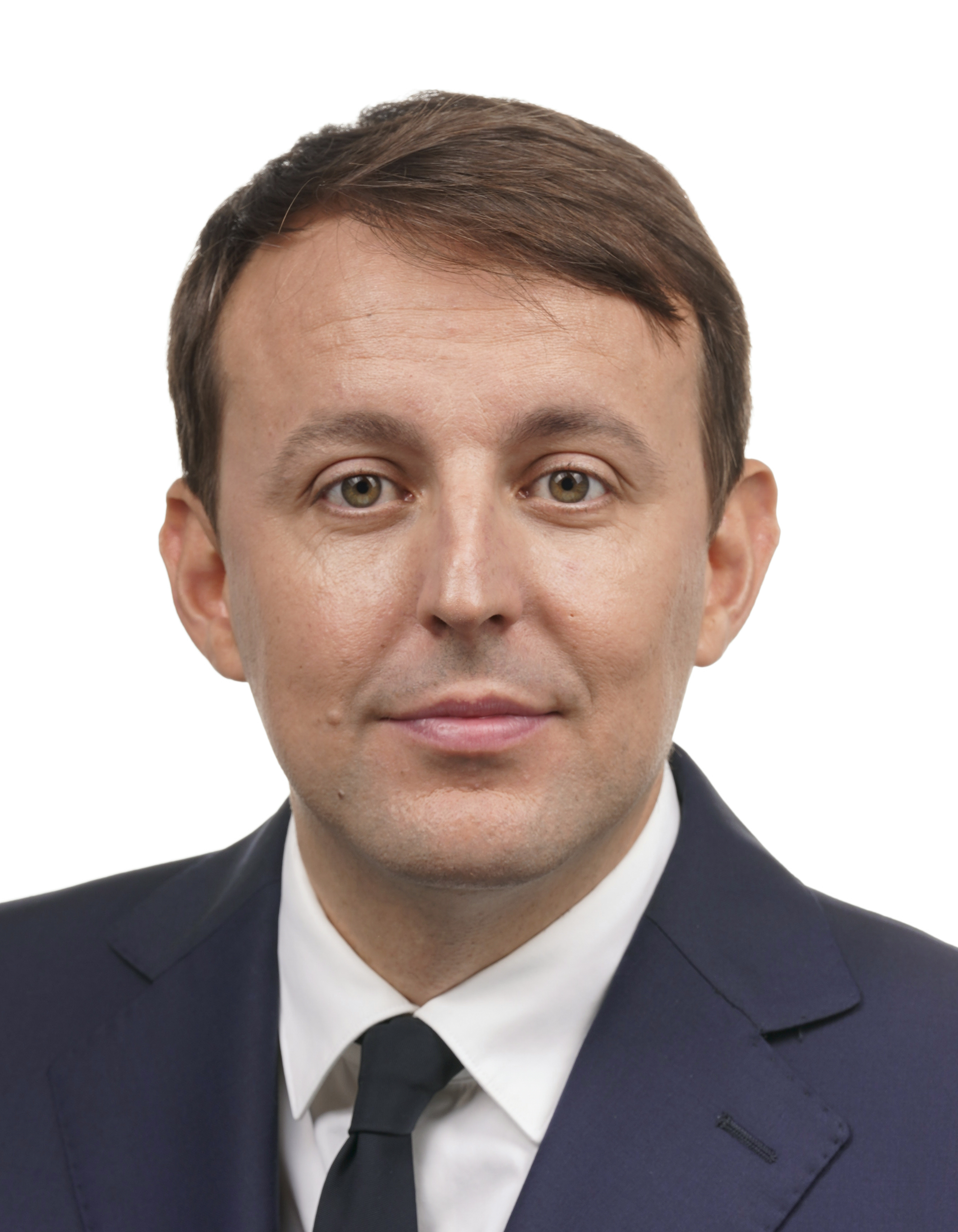

Member of the European Parliament for Spain
- Incumbent
- Assumed office 1 July 2014

Personal details
- Party: Socialists' Party of Catalonia

Javier "Javi" López Fernández (pronounced [ˈxaβi ˈlopeθ feɾˈnandeθ]; born 11 November 1985) is a Spanish politician who was first elected as a Member of the European Parliament in 2014.

== Political career ==
In Parliament, López Fernández served on the Committee on Employment and Social Affairs from 2014 until 2019 before moving to the Committee on the Environment, Public Health and Food Safety and the Subcommittee on Security and Defence. In addition to his committee assignments, he is Chair of the Parliament's delegation to the Euro-Latin American Parliamentary Assembly. He is also a member of the European Parliament Intergroup on Seas, Rivers, Islands and Coastal Areas.

== Other activities ==
- European Council on Foreign Relations (ECFR), Member of the Council
