= Mounir Satouri =

French politician (born 1975)

Mounir Satouri MEP
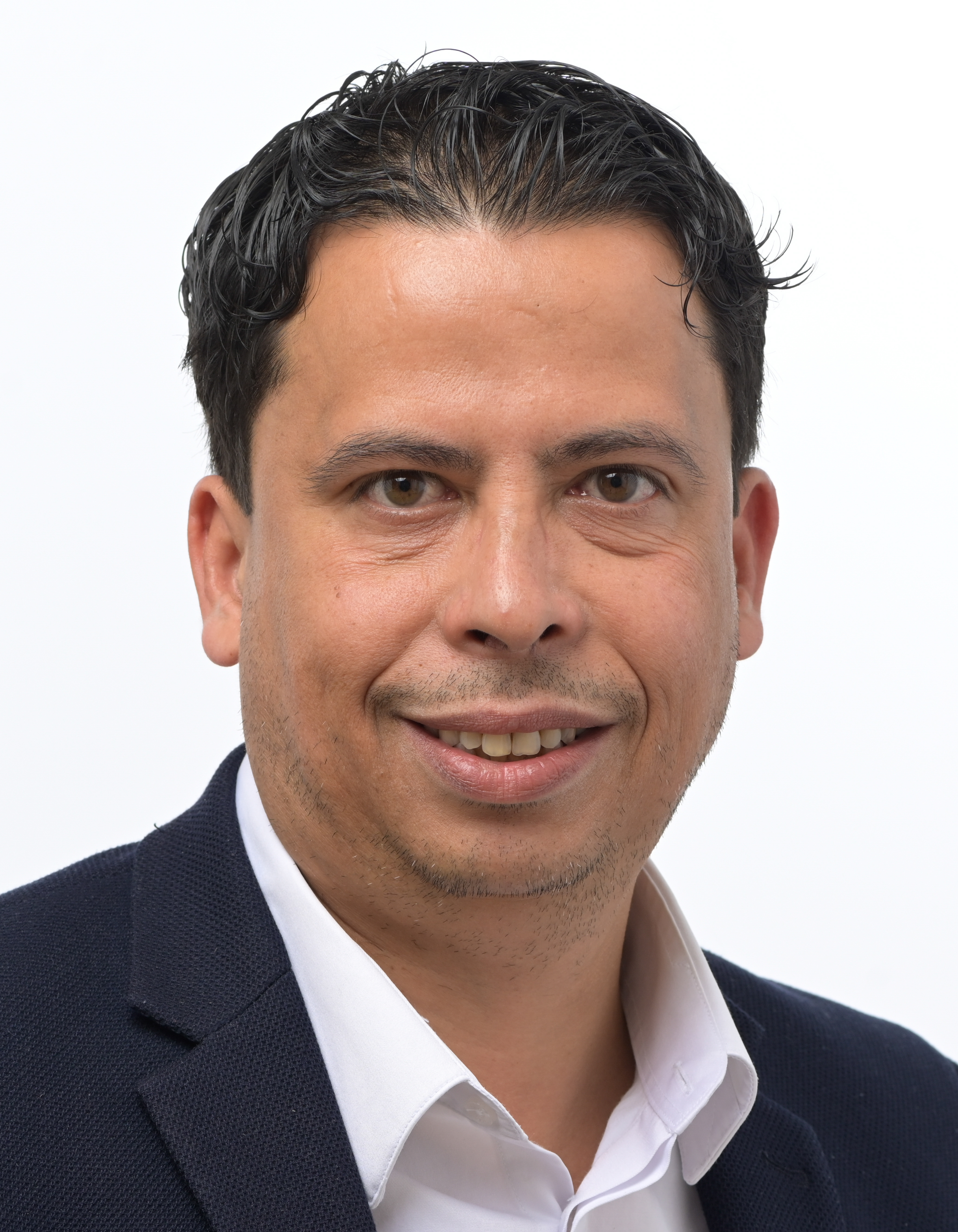

Member of the European Parliament for France
- Incumbent
- Assumed office 2 July 2019

Personal details
- Born: 25 May 1975 (age 50) Casablanca, Morocco
- Party: Europe Ecology – The Greens

Mounir Satouri (born 25 May 1975) is a French politician who was elected as a Member of the European Parliament in 2019.

== Political career ==
In the 2017 French Socialist Party presidential primary, Satouri endorsed Benoît Hamon's candidacy.

In parliament, Satouri serves on the Committee on Employment and Social Affairs and the Subcommittee on Security and Defence. In addition to his committee assignments, he is part of the parliament's delegations to the Parliamentary Assembly of the Union for the Mediterranean and for relations with the NATO Parliamentary Assembly. He is also a member of the European Parliament Intergroup on Anti-Racism and Diversity.

In 2020, Satouri joined Sylvie Guillaume, Frédérique Dumas and Hubert Julien-Laferrière in visiting several refugee camps in northern Syria that hold individuals displaced from the Islamic State of Iraq and the Levant, including al-Hawl and Roj.

Ahead of the 2022 presidential elections, Satouri publicly declared his support for Yannick Jadot as the Greens’ candidate and joined his campaign team as director.

Satouri was re-elected as an MEP in 2024.

== Other activities ==
- French Office for the Protection of Refugees and Stateless Persons (OFPRA), Member of the Board of Directors
