= Özlem Demirel =

German politician

Özlem Demirel MEP
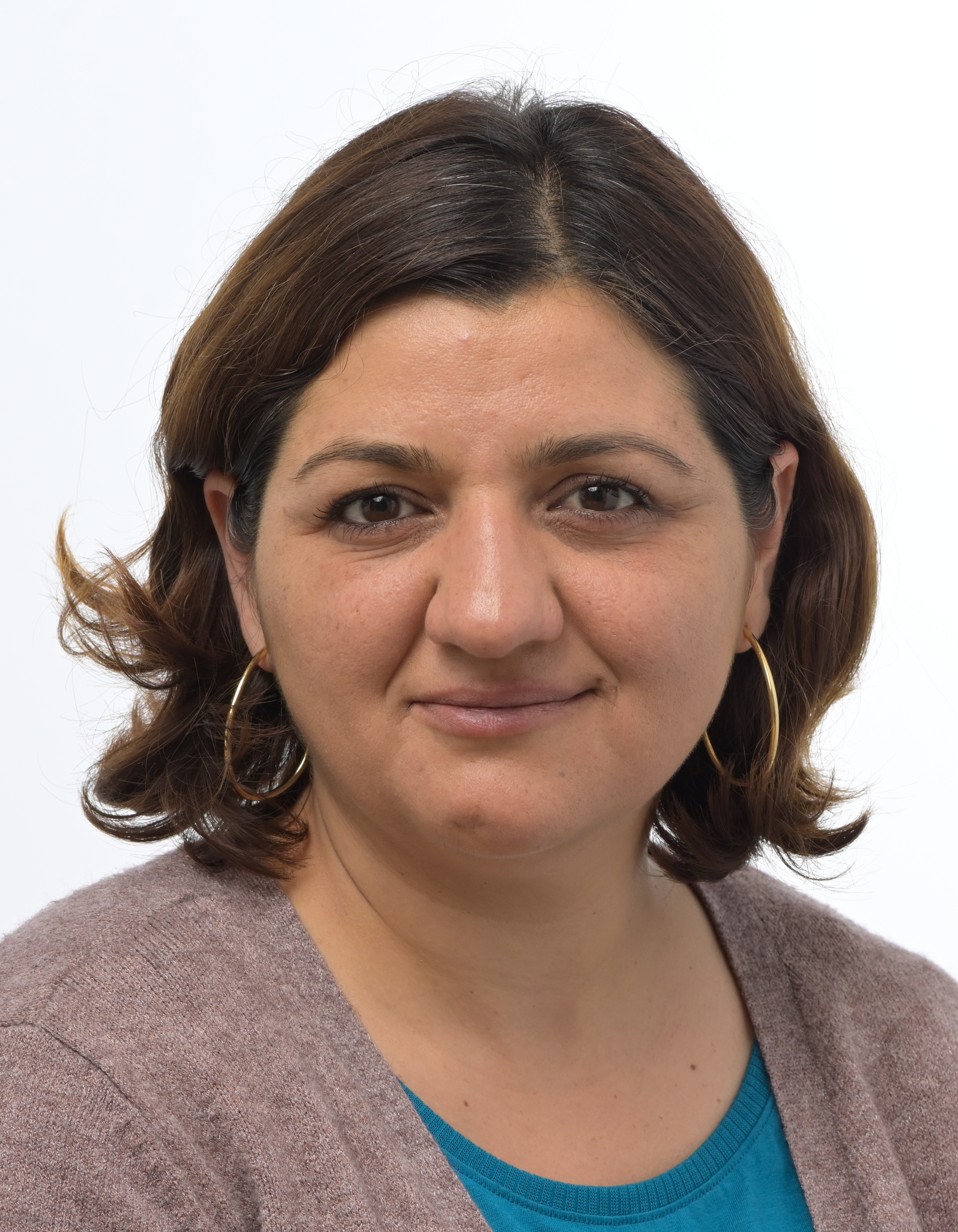
- Official portrait, 2024

Member of the European Parliament for Germany
- Incumbent
- Assumed office 2 July 2019

Member of the Landtag of North Rhine-Westphalia
- In office 9 May 2010 – 13 May 2012

Member of the Cologne City Council
- In office 19 September 2004 – 8 May 2010

Personal details
- Born: Özlem Alev Demirel; 10 March 1984 (age 42) Malatya, Turkey
- Citizenship: Germany • Turkey
- Party: The Left (2007–present)
- Other political affiliations: PDS (2004–2007)
- Spouse: Mr. Böhlke (m. 2011)
- Children: 2
- Education: University of Bonn
- Occupation: Political scientist • Historian • Politician
- Website: https://oezlem-alev-demirel.de

Özlem Alev Demirel-Böhlke (born 10 March 1984) is a Turkish-born German politician of Kurdish descent who is currently a serving representative of the party The Left as a Member of the European Parliament.

== Education ==
She attended primary and secondary education in Bielefeld and Cologne, and graduated from high school in 2004. she began to study political sciences and history at the University of Bonn.

== Political career ==
She has interested herself early on in politics and with 15 years she became involved in the youth section of the Democratic Workers Union (DIDF). In 2012 she became the DIDF Chairwoman. From 2004 to 2007 she was a member of the Party of Democratic Socialism (PDS), and co-founded The Left party in 2007. She led The Left in the campaign together with Christian Leye to the election to the State Parliament (Landtag) of Nord Rhine-Westphalia in 2017, where The Left did not reach the affordable 5% to enter the Landtag. She was again the leading candidate of The Left's electoral campaign to the European Parliament in 2019 to which she was elected on 24 May 2019. In the European Parliament she is both a vice chair of the Subcommittee on Security and Defence and the Delegation to the EU-Turkey Joint Parliamentary Committee

On 2 March 2022, she was one of 13 MEPs who voted against a resolution condemning the Russian invasion of Ukraine and calling for the arming of Ukraine. Demirel said the resolution would only worsen the situation and that "I think it is cynical to abuse the suffering of the Ukrainians for something like this. The peoples in Ukraine, of Europe and the world want to live in peace and social security". In March 2022 she was amongst 151 international feminists signing Feminist Resistance Against War: A Manifesto, in solidarity with the Russian Feminist Anti-War Resistance. This manifesto was criticized by both Ukrainian feminists and members of the Feminist Anti-War Resistance themselves.

== Personal life ==
Demirel was born in Malatya in 1984 to a Kurdish family of Alevi faith, and migrated to Germany together with her family when she was 5 years old. She is married since 2011, and a mother of two children.
