= Kostas Papadakis =

Kostas Papadakis may refer to:

- Kostas Papadakis (violinist)
- Kostas Papadakis (basketball)
