= Hans Neuhoff =

German cultural sociologist, musicologist and politician (born 1959)

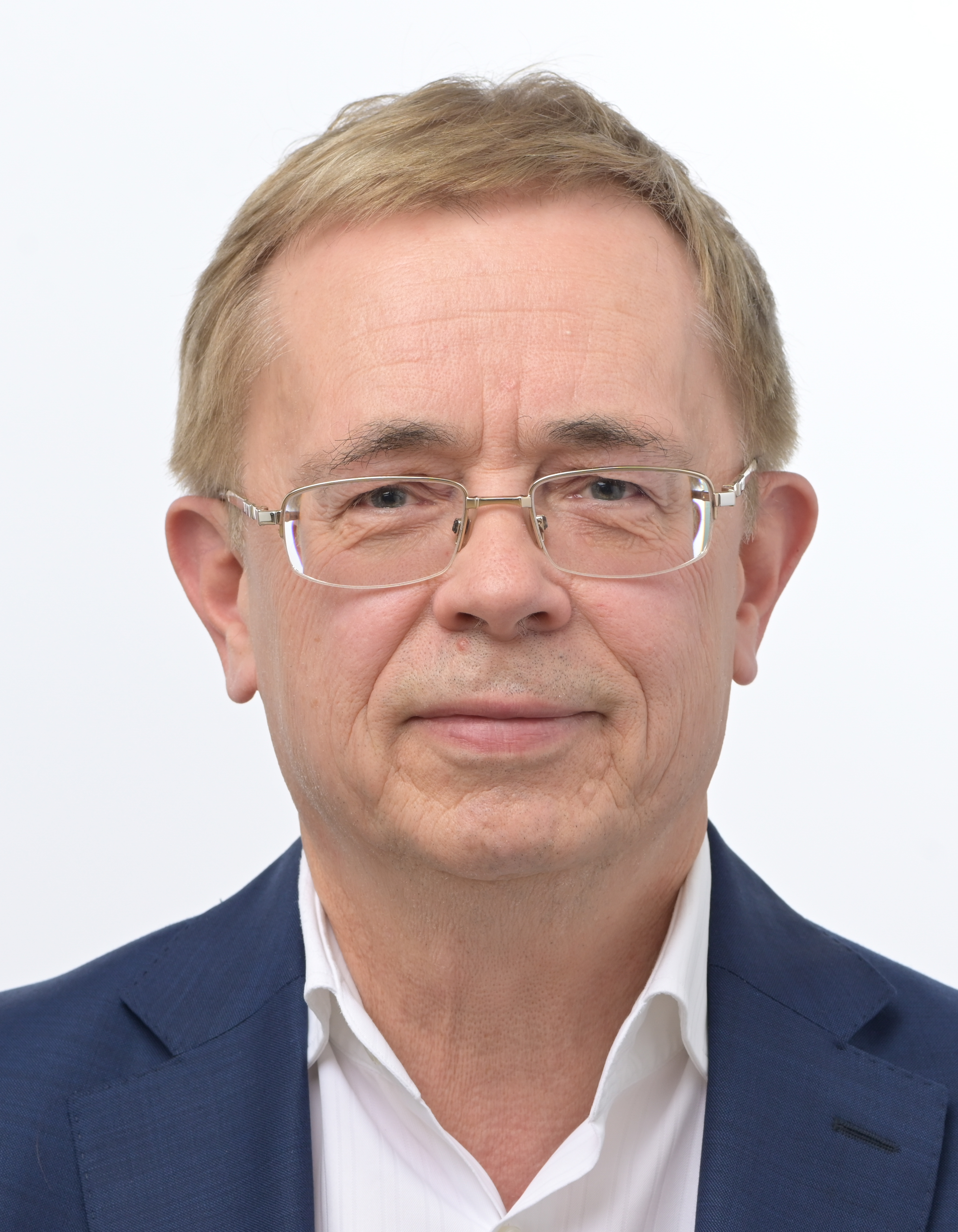
Hans Neuhoff in 2024

Hans Ludwig Neuhoff (born 1959) is a German cultural sociologist, musicologist and politician (AfD). He has been professor for sociology and musical psychology at the Cologne University of Music since 2004. Neuhoff was elected to the European Parliament in the 2024 European Parliament election.

== Life and career ==
Born in Bonn in 1959, Neuhoff studied musicology at the TU Berlin and received a Ph.D. in 1994. He has worked on various cross-cultural projects concerning music and dance with artists from diverse backgrounds such as India, the Middle East and Africa. In 2015 Neuhoff attended a conference about music and immigration and demanded that artists with a migration background should receive equal opportunities in their musical careers.

== Politics ==
Neuhoff joined the AfD in 2017. He has held various offices in the party, including chairman of the AfD Bonn and member of the executive committee of the AfD North Rhine-Westphalia.

He was elected into the City Council of Bonn in the 2020 North Rhine-Westphalia local elections. In 2024 he was criticised by the local party chapter because he only attended 13 of 36 council sessions since he assumed office in 2020.

Neuhoff was elected to the 8th position of the AfD’s electoral list for the 2024 European elections. One day after the 2024 European elections, Neuhoff successfully proposed the exclusion of the leading candidate Maximilian Krah from the AfD-delegation.

Neuhoff has frequently advocated pro-Russian stances. During the 2024 election campaign, Neuhoff attended a panel discussion staged by the local Chamber of Commerce and Industry in which he claimed that Russia poses no threat as long as Vladimir Putin 'is there'.

In 2025, Neuhoff demanded the surrender of Ukraine and described Russia as a 'defensive empire which protects its security interests'. In November of that same year, Neuhoff attended a 'BRICS-Europe conference' in Sochi with two other AfD politicians, an event organized by oligarch Viktor Medvedchuk with Dmitry Medvedev as keynote speaker. In December 2025, a planned journey of the European Parliament Committee on Security and Defence to Kyiv had to be canceled because Ukraine would have likely denied entry to Hans Neuhoff. The Ukrainian embassy in Germany commented: 'The pro-Russian positions of Mr. Hans Neuhoff are of course known to us'.

== Personal life ==
Neuhoff is married and has three children. His wife was born in Burkina Faso.
