= Arkadiusz Mularczyk =

Polish politician (born 1971)

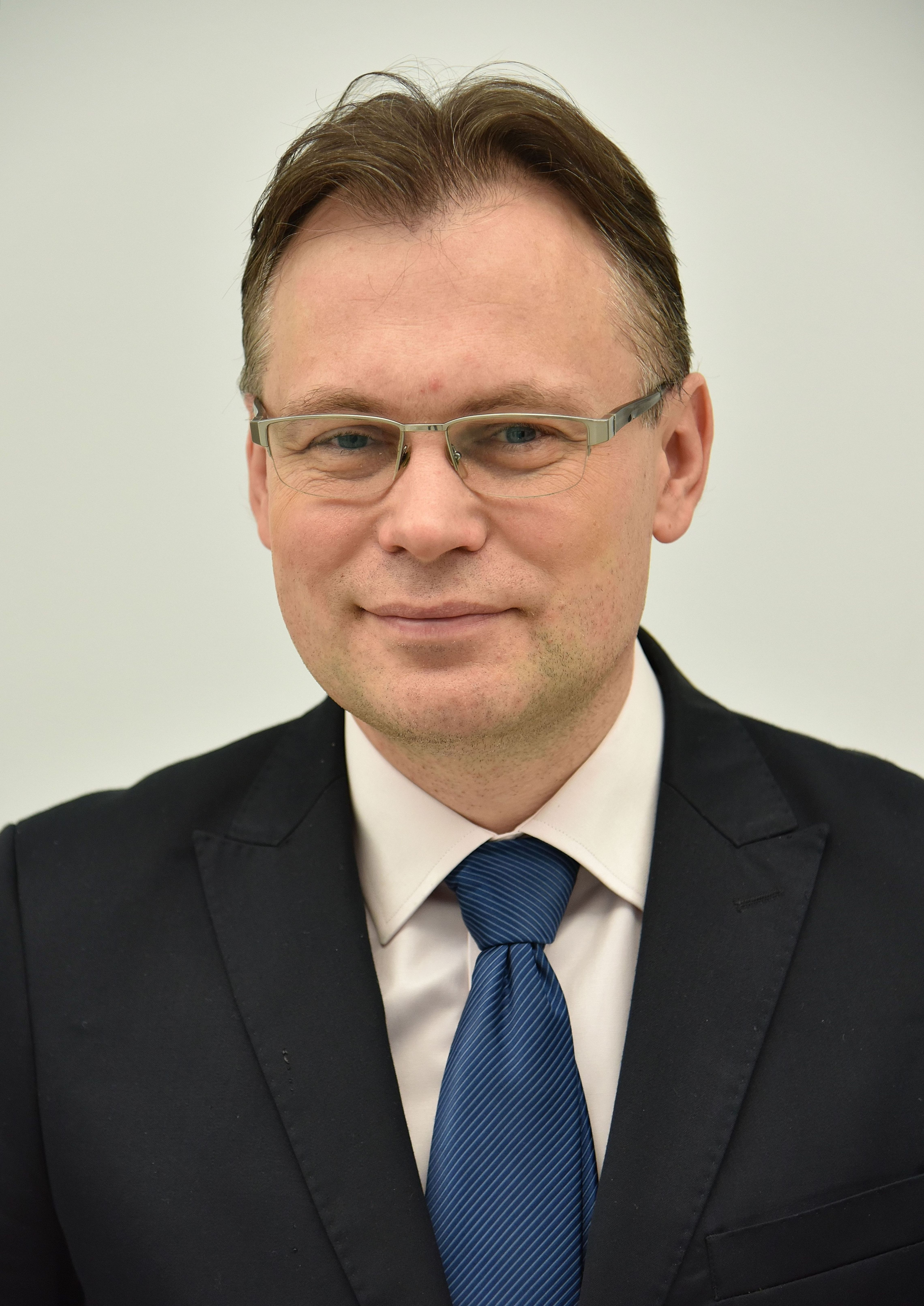

Member of the Sejm
- Incumbent
- Assumed office 25 September 2005

Personal details
- Born: 4 February 1971 (age 55)
- Party: Law and Justice
- Spouse: Iwona Mularczyk
- Profession: lawyer
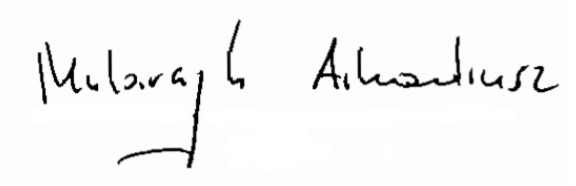
- Signature

Arkadiusz Mularczyk (born 4 February 1971 in Racibórz) is a Polish politician. He was elected to the Sejm on 25 September 2005, getting 9,566 votes in 14 Nowy Sącz district as a candidate from the Law and Justice list.

On 4 November 2011 he, along with 15 other supporters of the dismissed PiS MEP Zbigniew Ziobro, left Law and Justice on ideological grounds to form a breakaway group, United Poland.

• Born 4/2/1971 in Racibórz, Poland

• Graduated with a Masters in Law from the Jagiellonian University, Kraków in 1996.

• Local councillor in Nowy Sacz from 1992-2002.

• Postgraduate studies at the Helsinki Foundation of Human Rights in Warsaw in 2000.

• Qualified to the bar in 2001, and worked as an Attorney-at-law until 2005.

• Elected as an MP in 2005, and is currently serving his 5th term of office.

• Delegate to the Council of Europe since 2011

• Represented the Polish parliament in front of the Constitutional Tribunal

On November 22, 2019, he was elected by the Sejm to the National Council of the Judiciary. In October 2020, he was elected by the NCJ as its vice-chairman. In the same year, he also became the chairman of the delegation of the Polish Parliament to the Parliamentary Assembly of the Council of Europe, and in 2021 he became the vice-chairman of the Parliamentary Assembly of the Council of Europe and the secretary of State Ministry of Foreign Affairs.

As of 2022, he was Chair of the Council of the Jan Karski Institute of War Losses.

In 2024, he was elected to the European Parliament.

== Political biography ==
- Members of Polish Sejm 2005-2007

Positions held in office:

Poland’s 5th Parliament 2005-2007

• Chairman of the Sub-Committee on Amendments to the Code of Penal Procedure

• Vice-Chairman of the Justice and Human Rights Committee

• Vice-Chairman of the Codification Committee

• Member of the Legislative Committee

• Member of the Sub-Committee on the Constitutional Tribunal

• Co-drafted the Lustration Act with now-President, Andrzej Duda

Poland’s 6th Parliament 2007-2011

• Vice-Chairman of the Justice and Human Rights Committee

• Vice-Chairman of the Legislative Committee

• Participated in the Investigation Committee looking at illegal political influence on the judiciary and Polish secret service

Poland’s 7th Parliament 2011-2015

• Chairman of the parliamentary party

• Vice-Chairman of the Committee for Constitutional Responsibility

• Member of the Polish delegation to the Council of Europe

• Member of the Committee for Foreign Affairs

Poland’s 8th Parliament 2015-2019

• Chairman for the newly-established parliamentary Committee for War Reparations

• Chairman of the Extraordinary Committee for Amending Codification

• Chairman of the Permanent Subcommittee for Amendments to Civil Law

• Member of the Legislative Committee

• Member of the Committee for Foreign Affairs

• Member of the Council of Europe Committee on the Election of Judges to the ECHR

Poland’s 9th Parliament 2019 onwards

• Leader of the Polish delegation to the Council of Europe

• Vice-Chairman of the National Council of the Judiciary of Poland

• Vice-Chairman of the Foreign Affairs Committee

• Vice-Chairman of the Legislative Committee

• Member of the Council of Europe Committee on Legal Affairs and Human Rights

• Member of the Regulations, Deputies' Affairs and Immunities Committee

• Member of the delegation to the Central European Initiative

== See also ==
- Members of Polish Sejm 2005-2007
