= Alberico Gambino =

Italian politician (born 1967)

Alberico Gambino MEP
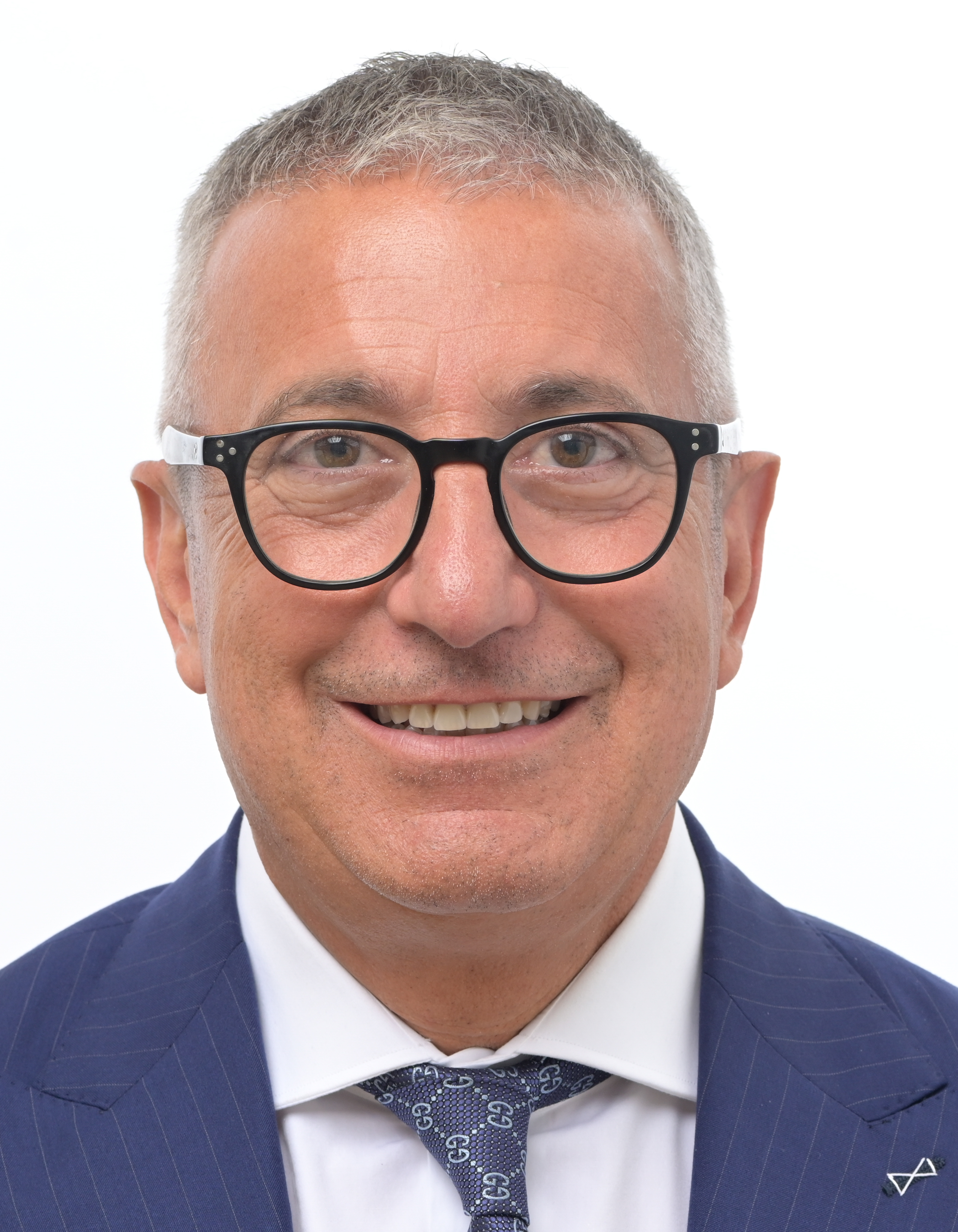
- Gambino in 2024

Member of the European Parliament for Southern Italy
- Incumbent
- Assumed office 16 July 2024

Personal details
- Born: 7 December 1967 (age 58)
- Party: Brothers of Italy (2014–2018, 2021–present)
- Other political affiliations: ECR Party; FI (1994–2009); PdL (2009–2013); NcI (2018–2021); DI (2019)

Alberico Gambino (born 7 December 1967) is an Italian politician of Brothers of Italy who was elected member of the European Parliament in 2024. He previously served as mayor of Pagani and as a member of the Regional Council of Campania.
