= Danilo Della Valle =

Italian politician (born 1983)

Danilo Della Valle MEP
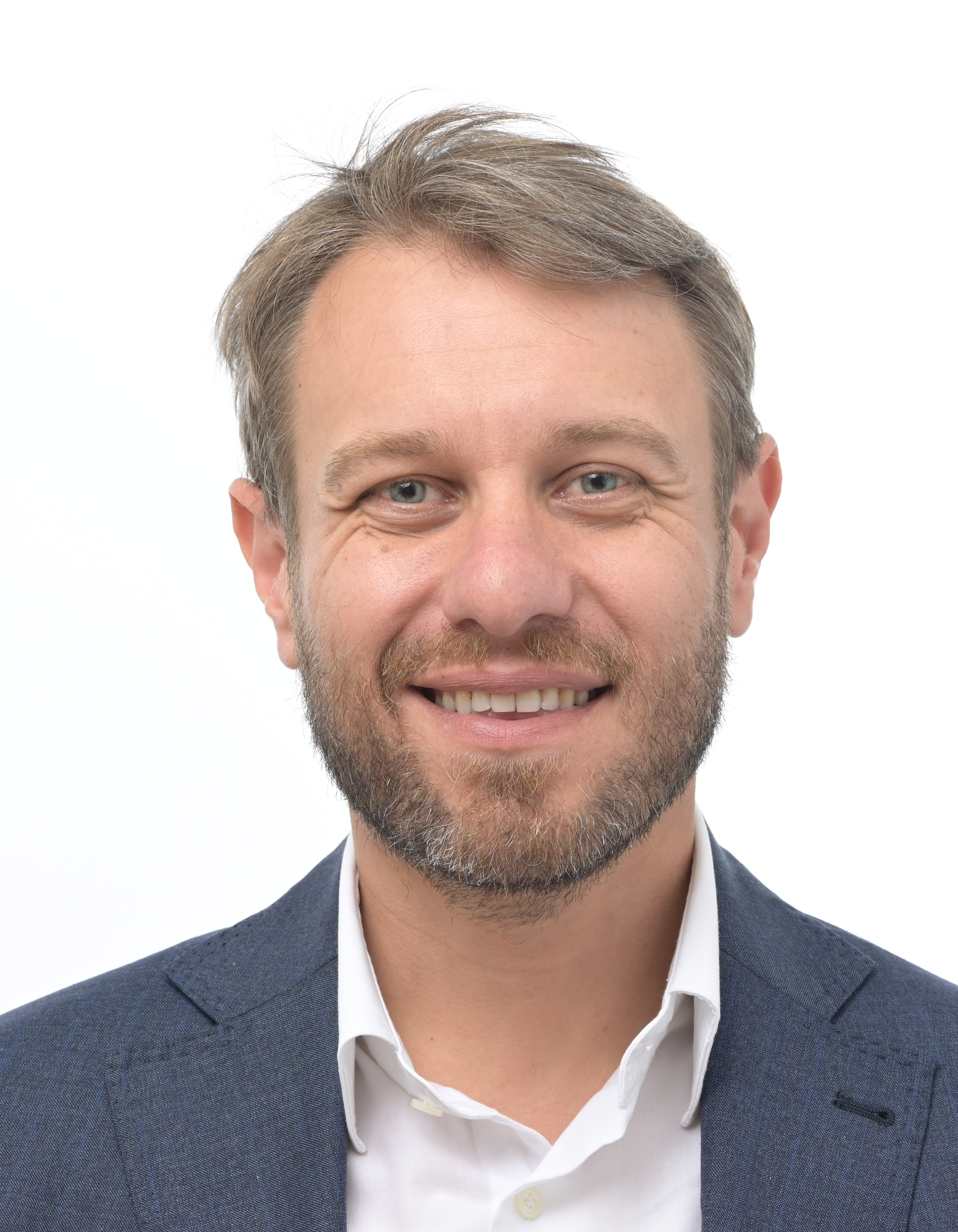

Member of the European Parliament for Southern Italy
- Incumbent
- Assumed office 16 July 2024

Personal details
- Born: 1 February 1983 (age 43) Capua, Italy
- Party: Five Star Movement
- Other political affiliations: The Left

Danilo Della Valle (born 1 February 1983) is an Italian politician of the Five Star Movement who was elected member of the European Parliament in 2024.

== Early life and career ==
Della Valle was born in Capua, Italy. He grew up in Santa Maria, where he attended the classical high school. He and his family later moved to Caserta. There he studied political science at the University of Campania Luigi Vanvitelli. In 2011, he went to Russia to conduct research for his thesis. He was a candidate for the European Parliament in 2019. In the 2022 Italian general election he contested the Campania 2 – 02 constituency, finishing second behind Letizia Giorgianni.
