= Christophe Gomart =

French military officer and politician (born 1960)

Army corps general Christophe Gomart MEP
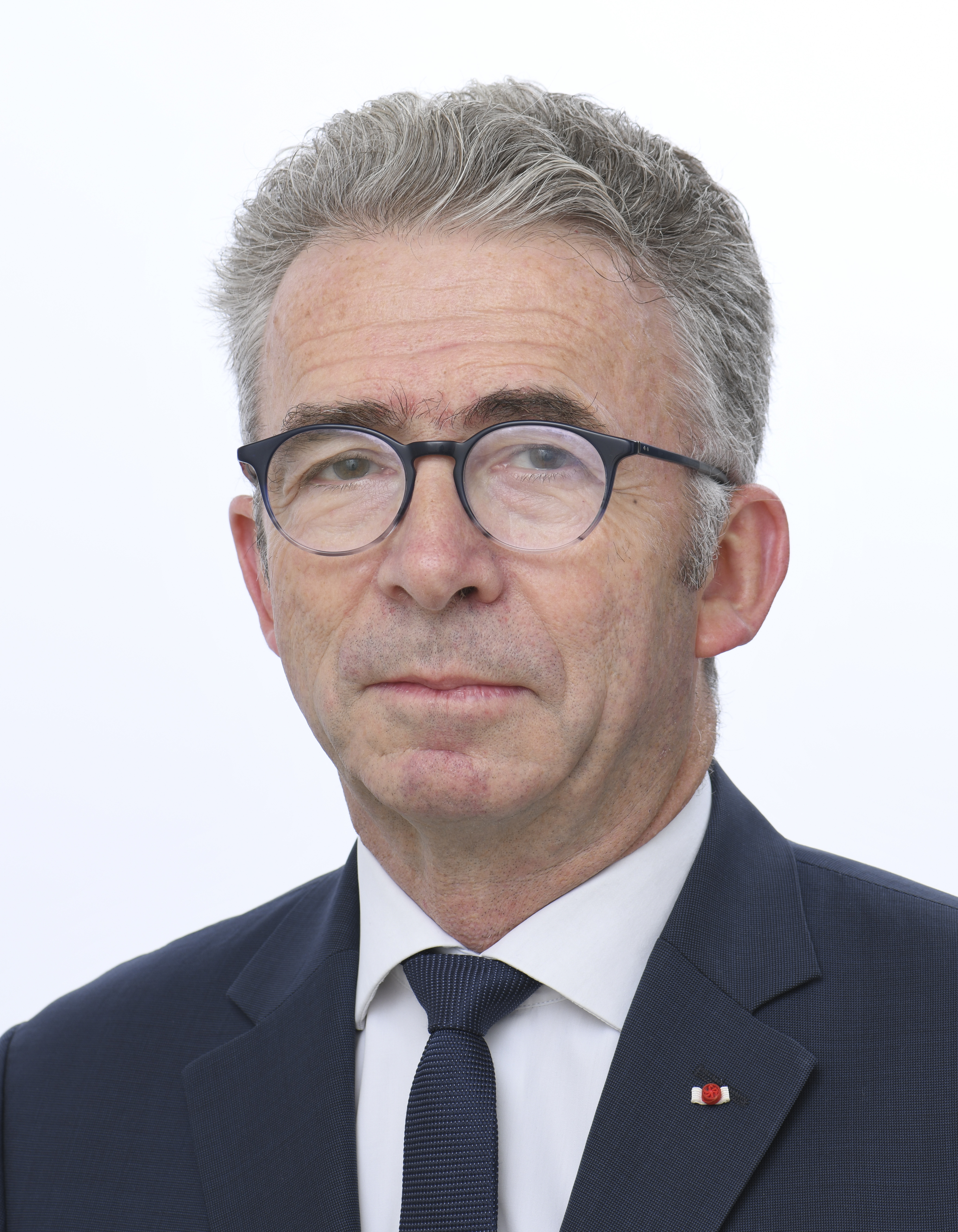

Member of the European Parliament
- Incumbent
- Assumed office 16 July 2024
- Constituency: France

Director of Military Intelligence
- In office 21 June 2013 – 6 July 2017
- President: François Hollande; Emmanuel Macron
- Preceded by: Didier Bolelli
- Succeeded by: Jean-François Ferlet

Commander of Special Operations
- In office 1 August 2011 – 20 June 2013
- Preceded by: Frédéric Beth
- Succeeded by: Grégoire de Saint-Quentin

Personal details
- Born: Christophe Étienne Marie Gomart; 20 June 1960 (age 66) Saumur, France
- Party: The Republicans
- Other political affiliations: European People's Party
- Education: École spéciale militaire de Saint-Cyr

Christophe Étienne Marie Gomart (French pronunciation: [kʁistɔf ɡɔmaʁ]; born 20 June 1960) is a French retired military officer and politician of The Republicans (LR) who was elected a Member of the European Parliament (MEP) in 2024. He served as commander of special operations from 2011 to 2013 and director of military intelligence from 2013 to 2017.

== Honours ==
- Commander of the Legion of Honour (2015)
- Commander of the Ordre national du Mérite (2011)
