= Hana Jalloul =

Spanish politician

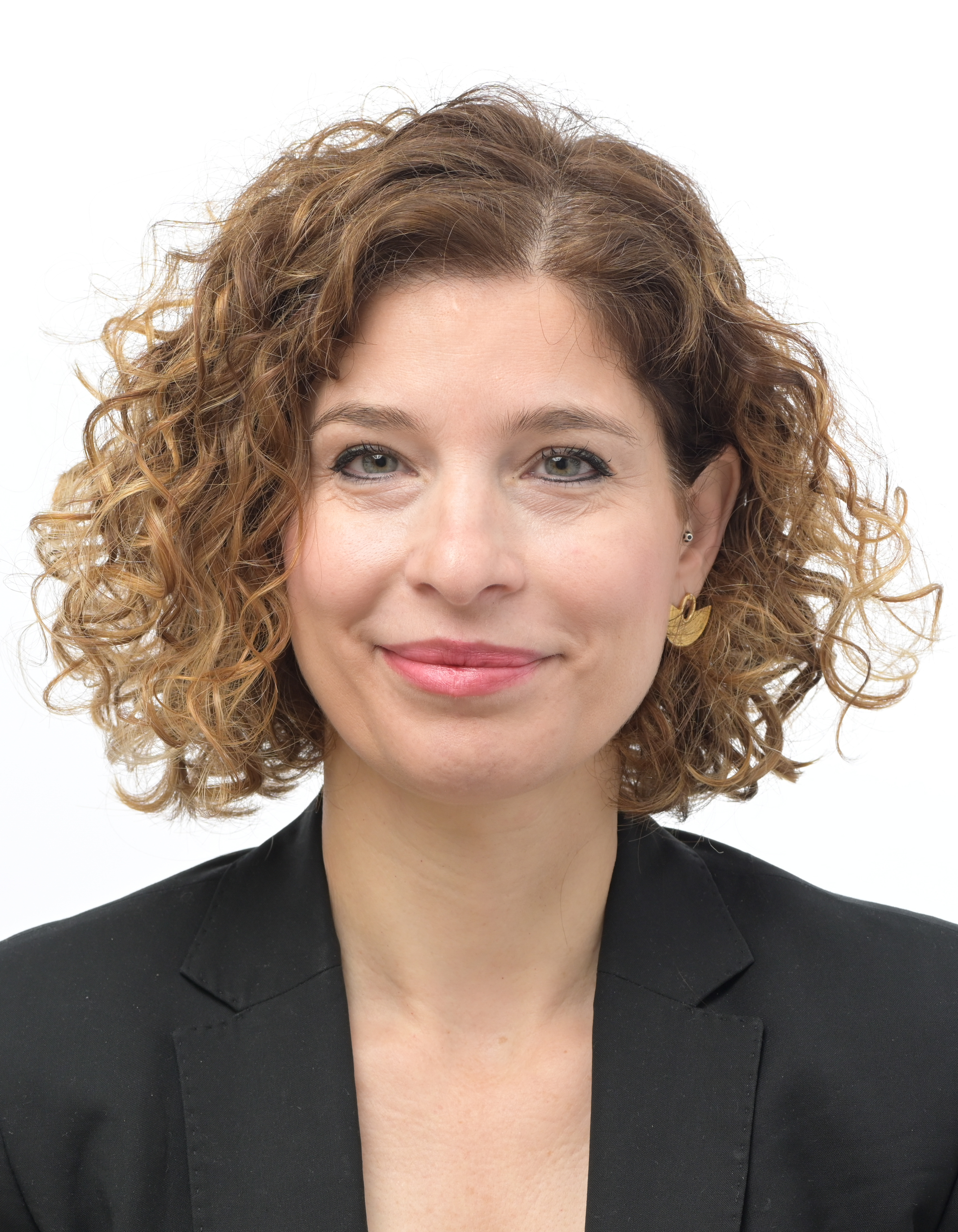
- Official portrait, 2024

Member of the European Parliament for Spain
- Incumbent
- Assumed office 16 July 2024

Secretary of State for Migration
- In office 30 January 2020 – 30 March 2021
- Prime Minister: Pedro Sánchez
- Preceded by: Consuelo Rumí
- Succeeded by: Jesús Javier Perea Cortijo

Member of the Congress of Deputies
- In office 5 December 2023 – 21 June 2024
- Constituency: Madrid

Member of the Assembly of Madrid
- In office 8 June 2021 – 13 June 2023
- In office 11 June 2019 – 30 January 2020

Personal details
- Born: Hana Jalloul Muro; 8 April 1978 (age 48) Zaragoza, Spain
- Citizenship: Spain • Lebanon
- Party: Spanish Socialist Workers' Party
- Education: Complutense University of Madrid
- Occupation: Associate professor • Political aide • Politician

Hana Jalloul Muro (Spanish pronunciation: [ˈxana ʝaˈlul]; born 8 April 1978) is a Spanish politician - currently Member of the European Parliament- and a lecturer in international terrorism. She currently serves as member of the Assembly of Madrid in the Spanish Socialist Workers' Party (PSOE) parliamentary group. She is also the spokesperson of the group. Previously, she served as Secretary of State for Migrations from 2020 to 2021.

== Biography ==
Born on 8 April 1978 in Zaragoza, her mother is Aragonese and her father Lebanese. After obtaining a licentiate degree in Political and Administration Sciences, Jalloul earned a PhD in International Relations and International Law from the Complutense University of Madrid (UCM). A resident in Leganés, Jalloul has worked as associate lecturer for the Charles III University of Madrid (UC3M) in the field of International Terrorism.

A member of the Spanish Socialist Workers' Party (PSOE), she also worked as adviser for José Manuel Rodríguez Uribes at the Delegation of the Government of Spain in the Community of Madrid.

She was included in the 20th place of the PSOE list for the 2019 Madrilenian regional election. Elected as member of the 11th term of the regional legislature, she was designated as the group's spokesperson at the Committee on Justice, Interior and Victims of Terrorism.

In January 2020 she was announced as prospective Secretary of State for Migrations.

In March 2021, Jalloul was announced in media as candidate in the PSOE list for the 2021 Madrilenian regional election (number 2 second to Ángel Gabilondo), so she left her post as Secretary of State on 30 March 2021 to run for office in the regional election. Together with Lina Gálvez, she was chosen to draft the framework presentation for the 40th PSOE Federal Congress. Elected at the May 2021 election, she was pinpointed as the PSOE's spokerperson at the regional legislature following the renouncement of Ángel Gabilondo to assume his seat.

== Other activities ==
- European Council on Foreign Relations (ECFR), Member
