= Liudas Mažylis =

Lithuanian politician

Liudas Mažylis MEP
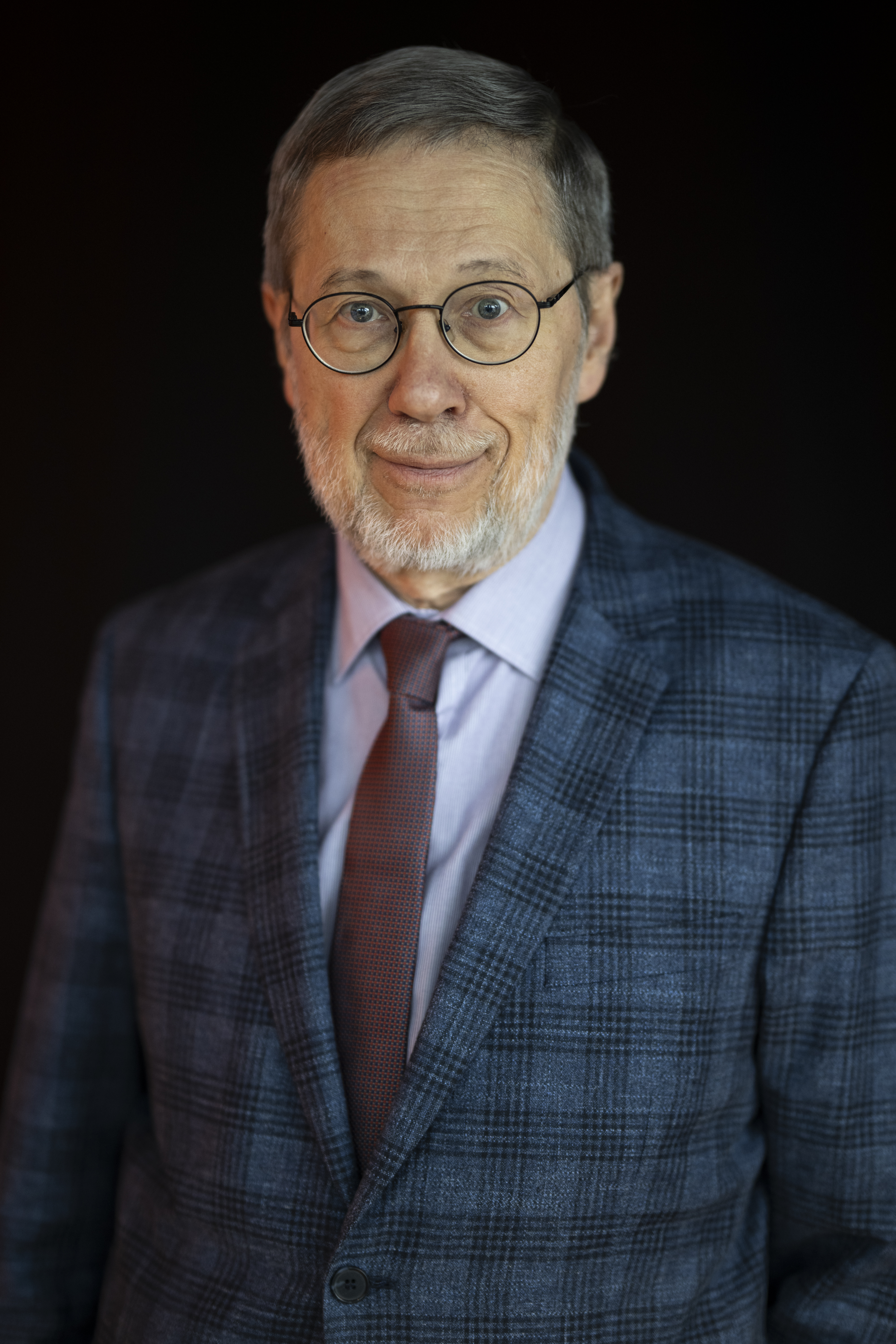

Member of the European Parliament
- Incumbent
- Assumed office 5 December 2024
- Constituency: Lithuania
- In office 2 July 2019 – 9 July 2024
- Constituency: Lithuania

Personal details
- Born: 19 May 1954 (age 71) Kaunas
- Party: Homeland Union

Liudas Mažylis (born 19 May 1954) is a Lithuanian politician who is a Member of the European Parliament for the Homeland Union.

Mažylis first served as an MEP from July 2019 to July 2024. He was not directly re-elected in 2024, but replaced Andrius Kubilius after his nomination as a European Commissioner in December 2024.
