= Łukasz Kohut =

Silesian politician (born 1982)

Łukasz Kohut MEP
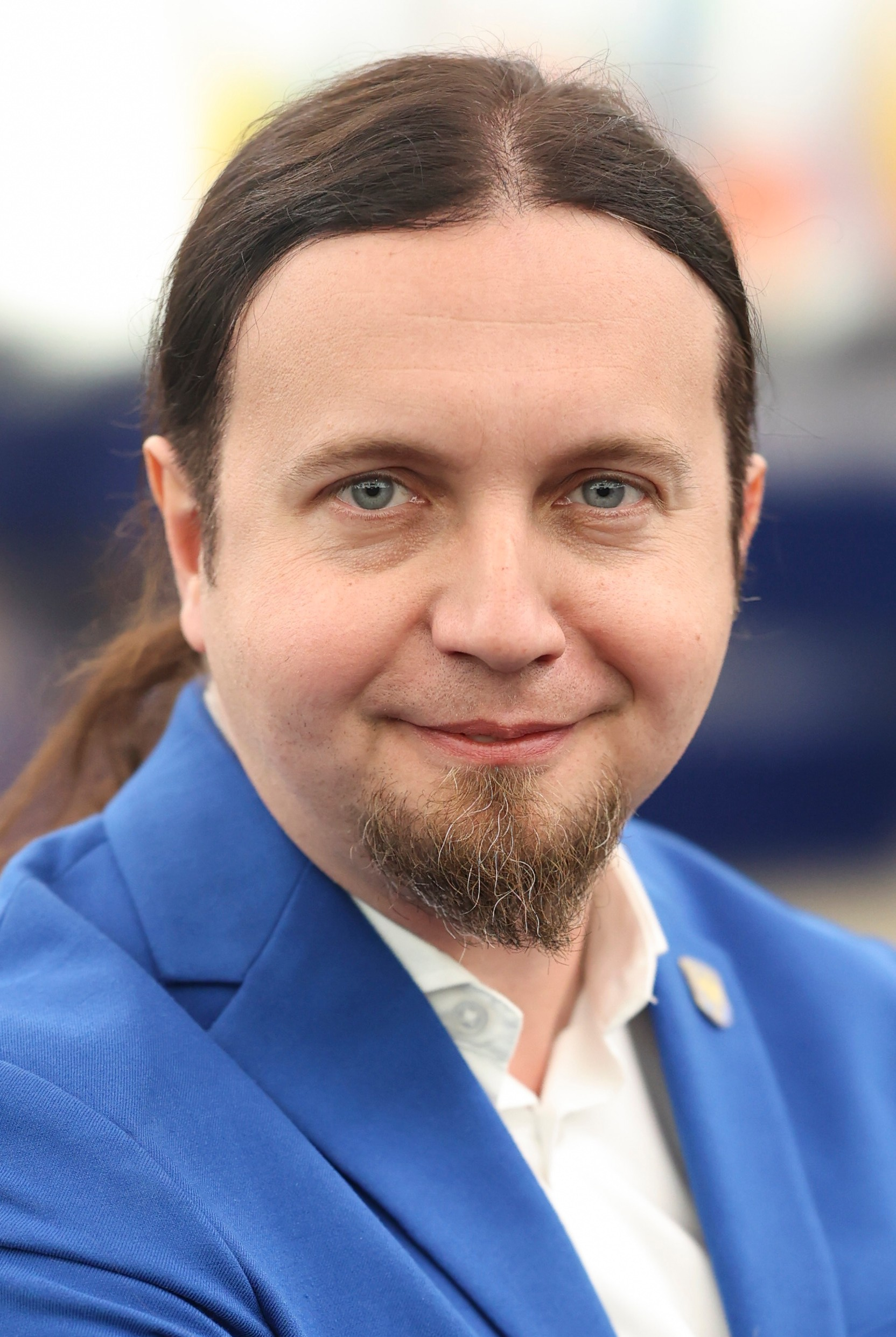

Member of the European Parliament for Poland
- Incumbent
- Assumed office 2 July 2019

Personal details
- Born: 10 September 1982 (age 43) Katowice, Poland
- Party: New Left (2021-2024); Independent (Since 2024)
- Other political affiliations: Poland: The Left (2019-2024); Civic Coalition (Since 2024); EU: Progressive Alliance of Socialists and Democrats (2019-2024); European People's Party Group (Since 2024)

Łukasz Marcin Kohut (born 10 September 1982) is a Silesian politician who has been serving as a Member of the European Parliament since the 2019 elections.

In parliament, Kohut has since been serving on the Committee on Industry, Research and Energy. He later also joined the Committee on Civil Liberties, Justice and Home Affairs (2020) and the Committee of Inquiry to investigate the use of Pegasus and equivalent surveillance spyware (2022).

In addition to his committee assignments, Kohut is part of the parliament's delegations to the EU-Serbia Stabilisation and Association Parliamentary Committee, for relations with Switzerland and Norway and to the EU-Iceland Joint Parliamentary Committee and the European Economic Area (EEA) Joint Parliamentary Committee. He is also a member of the European Parliament Intergroup on Western Sahara, the European Parliament Intergroup on Traditional Minorities, National Communities and Languages, and the URBAN Intergroup.

He was born in Katowice.
