= András László (politician) =

Hungarian politician

András László MEP
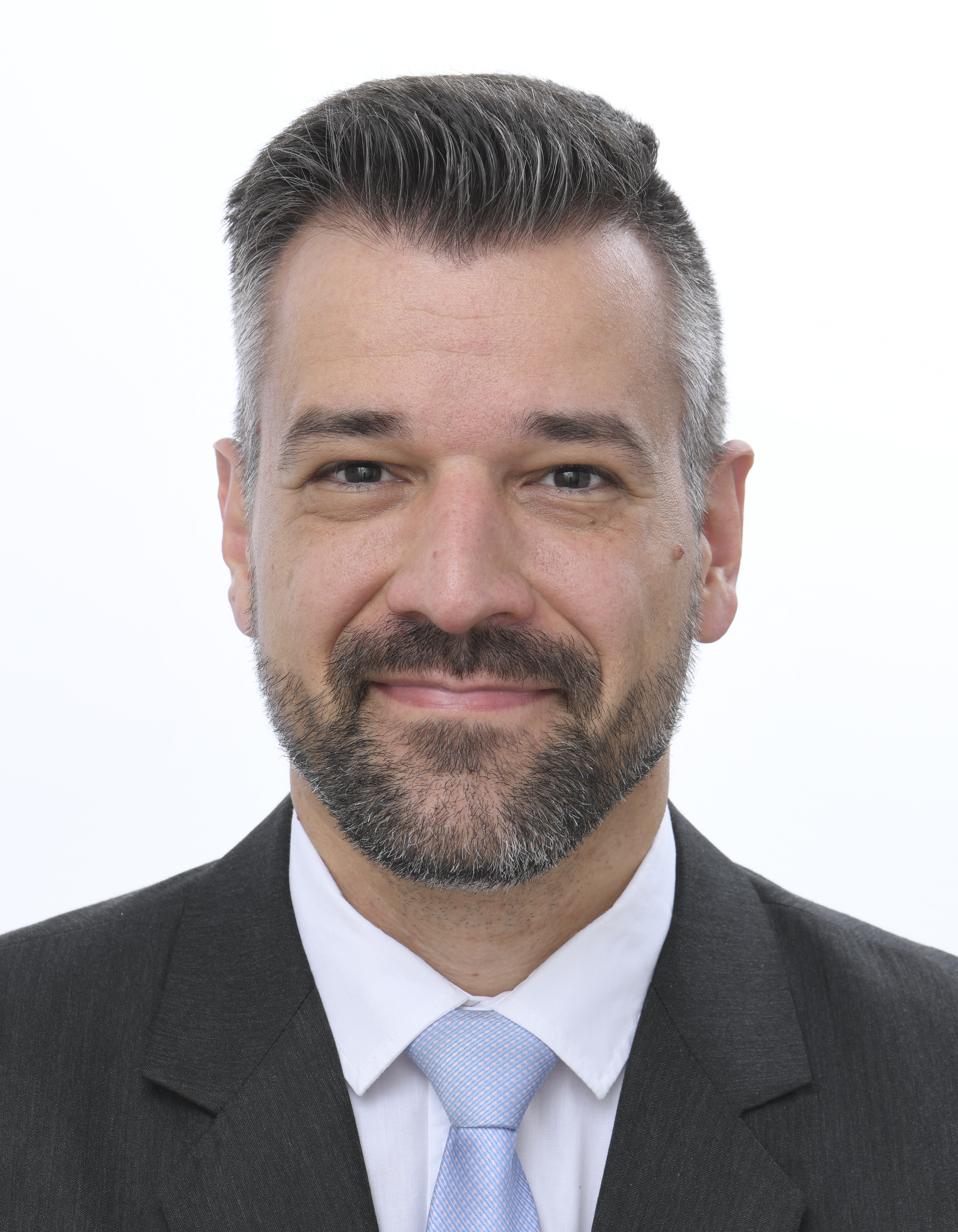
- Official portrait, 2024

Member of the European Parliament for Hungary
- Incumbent
- Assumed office 16 July 2024

Personal details
- Born: 16 February 1984 (age 42) Budapest, Hungary
- Party: Fidesz
- Other political affiliations: Patriots for Europe

András László (born 16 February 1984) is a Hungarian politician of Fidesz who was elected member of the European Parliament in 2024. He previously worked at the Ministry of Human Resources, the European People's Party Group, the Ministry for Innovation and Technology, and the Foreign Affairs Secretariat of Fidesz. András László is also a web and social media influencer, working for the platform Megafon, which promotes pro-government conservative and nationalist narratives.
