= Matthieu Valet =

French politician (born 1986)

Matthieu Valet MEP
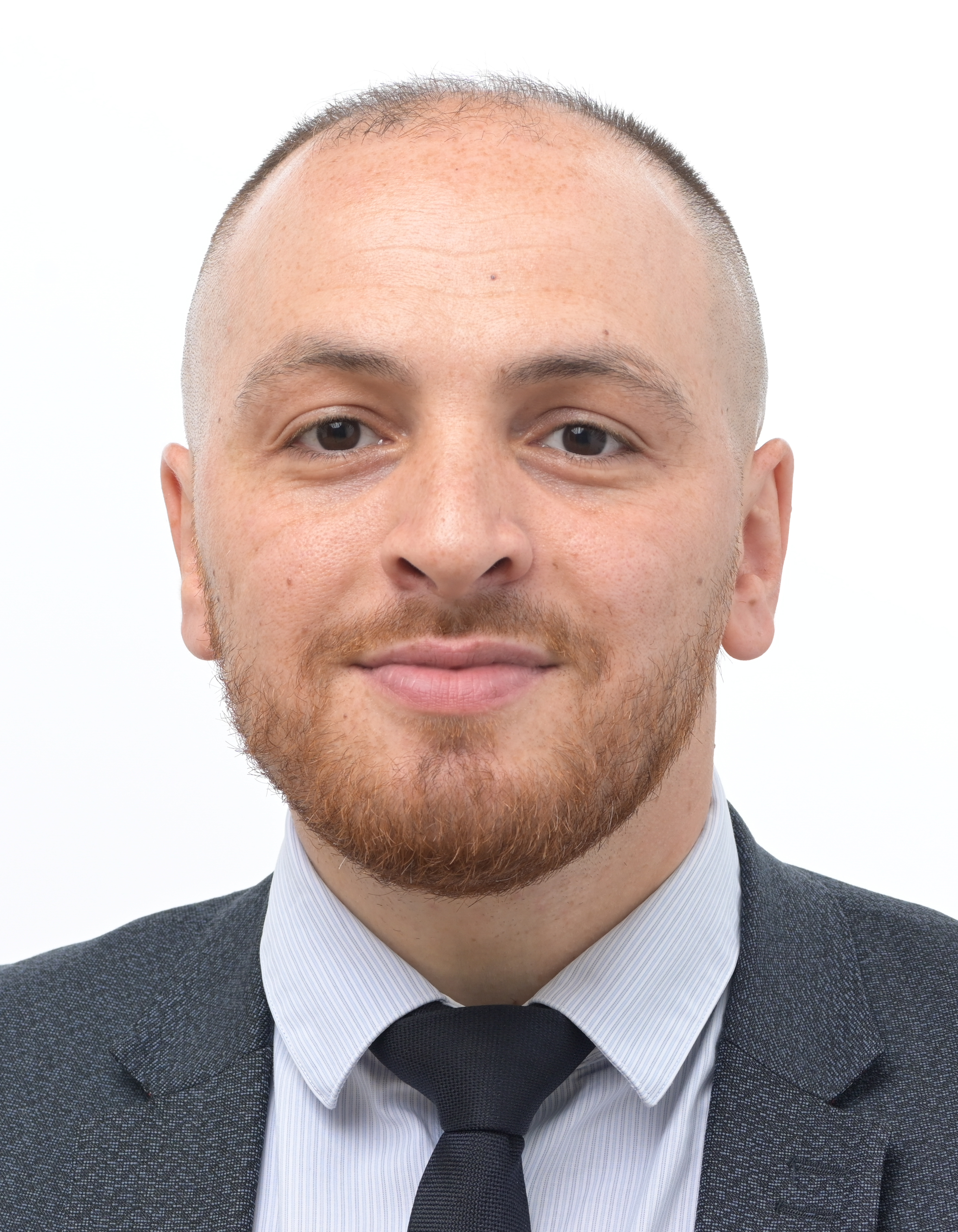

Member of the European Parliament
- Incumbent
- Assumed office 16 July 2024
- Constituency: France

Personal details
- Born: 4 January 1986 (age 40) Lille, France
- Party: National Rally (since 2024)
- Other political affiliations: Identity and Democracy Party
- Occupation: Police officer

Matthieu Valet (French pronunciation: [matjø valɛ]; born 4 January 1986) is a French police officer and politician of the National Rally (RN) who was elected a member of the European Parliament (MEP) in 2024.

== Career ==
Valet was born grew up in Lille. A former police officer, he served in Val-d'Oise, Seine-Saint-Denis and Bouches-du-Rhône. In 2018 he was promoted to the rank of commissaire de police. He was deputy chief of the Brigade anti-criminalité in Val-de-Marne during the 2023 Nahel Merzouk riots. Prior to his political career, he appeared in media as spokesperson of the Independent Union of Police Commissioners.

Before joining the National Rally, Valet sought to run for Renaissance in the 2022 legislative election, and was offered a candidacy in several constituencies, finally declining to run. He was elected to the European Parliament in 2024 on the National Rally list led by Jordan Bardella.

In 2025 he announced his candidacy for mayor of Lille in 2026.
