= Alice Teodorescu Måwe =

Romanian-Swedish politician

Alice Teodorescu Måwe MEP
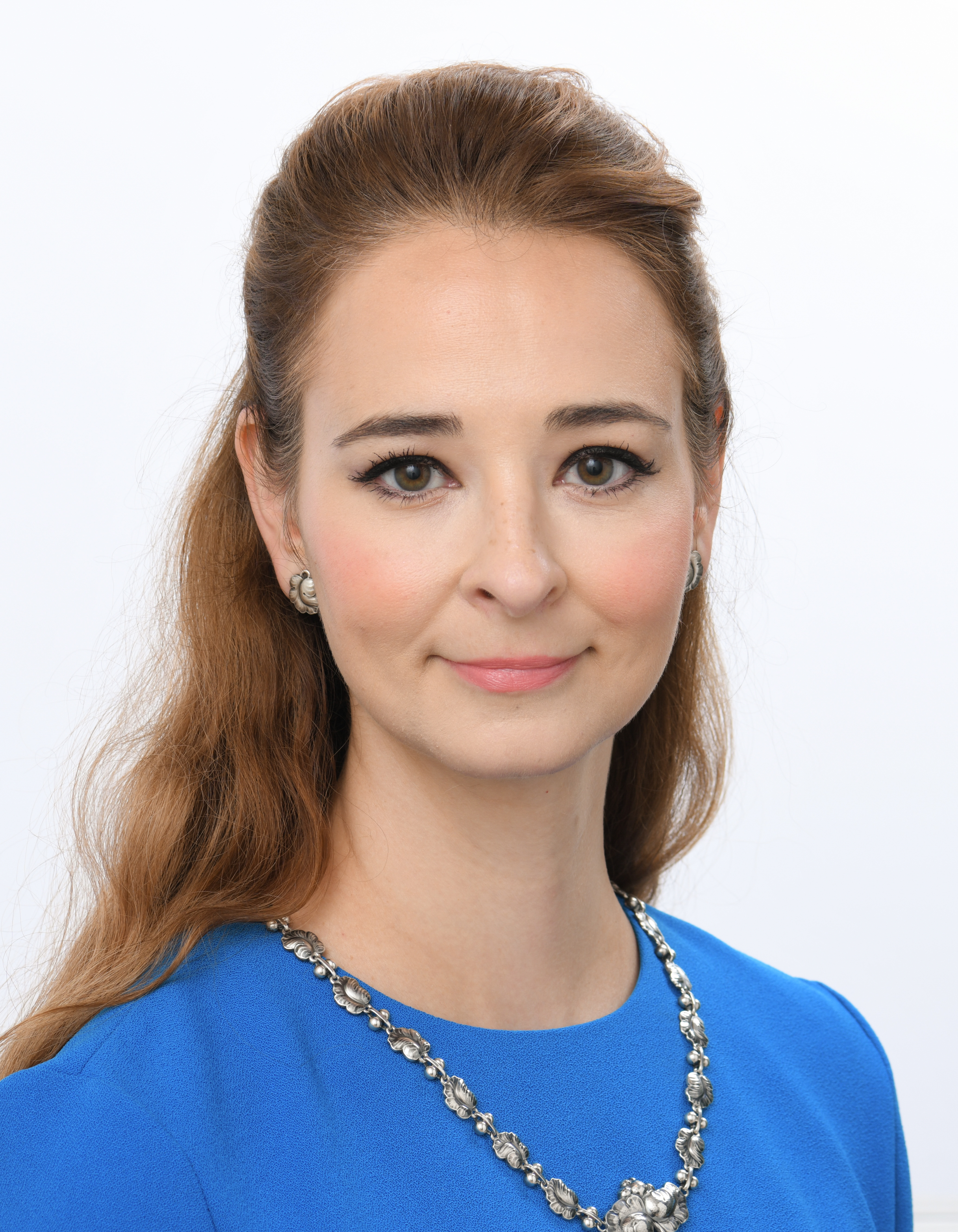
- Official portrait, 2024

Member of the European Parliament for Sweden
- Incumbent
- Assumed office 16 July 2024

Personal details
- Born: Alice Alexandra Teodorescu; 2 May 1984 (age 42) Bucharest, Romania
- Citizenship: Sweden • Romania
- Party: Christian Democrats (since 2024)
- Other political affiliations: Moderate (2019–2024)
- Spouse: Henrik Måwe (m. 2019)
- Education: Lund University
- Occupation: Politician

Alice Alexandra Teodorescu Måwe (born 2 May 1984) is a Romanian-Swedish politician, former legal professional with the Företagarna organisation of Swedish entrepreneurs and a liberal-conservative commentator. Since 2024, she is a Member of the European Parliament.

== Early life ==
Alice Teodorescu was born in Bucharest, Romania. She attended the Sture Academy, a training programme for young people run by liberal think tank Timbro.

== Career ==
After completing her legal training, she worked as an intern in the Brussels office of the Confederation of Swedish Enterprise and then became a communication strategist for the newspaper. She has also been an editorial writer for newspapers including Barometern in Oskarshamn and Gotlands Allehanda. In 2009, she founded a women's network called "En plats i himlen för kvinnor som hjälper varandra" ("A place in heaven for women who help each other").

Teodorescu criticised gender quotas on corporate boards and advocated a policy of equality based on individualism rather than collectivism. She has also written on integration and education. In February 2014 she attracted much attention by calling in a debate on the Sveriges Radio channel 1 programme P1 Debatt for a clear definition of the term "racism" and questioning whether racism in Sweden was structural. She also argued that it was time for a more nuanced, less dogmatic and polarising debate on the issue. During the Almedalen week in June and July 2014 Ali Esbati refused to shake hands with Teodorescu after a live broadcast debate between the two, this after a discussion about racism in Sweden. After the debate both Teodorescu and Esbati received criticism for not considering each other's opinions. In a subsequent opinion piece in Svenska Dagbladet, Teodorescu complained about what she saw as the lenient treatment of the Green Party by the press.

Teodorescu Måwe was running to become a Member of the European Parliament for the Christian Democrats in the upcoming EP elections for 2024. She replaced Sara Skyttedal as the party's top name for the election. She was voted into the parliament as the only Christian Democrat and took office on 16 July 2024.

During the ongoing war in the Middle East since 2023, Teodorescu Måwe has taken a strong pro-Israel stance in the public debate in Sweden. In 2024, she proposed that everyone, especially immigrants from the Levant who becomes a citizen of Sweden must recognize Israel as a state. In an interview with Swedish Television, she said: "Many of those who engage in 'Hamas-hugging' in these demonstrations also do not support other values that we take for granted in a Swedish context".

She is a parliamentary candidate in the 2026 Swedish general election.

== Allegations of antisemitism and anonymous donor ==
In 2018, Måwe wrote that Holocaust survivors were “fronts” for the political left. The statement was criticized by Dagens Nyheter’s Johan Hilton, who described it as ”shocking” and ”an appallingly vulgar statement”.

Måwe has also received criticism for accepting financial support from an anonymous donor. According to SVT Nyheter, the support is disclosed in a transparency document submitted to the European Parliament, but Måwe has declined to identify the donor or disclose the amount.

== Personal life ==
In 2019 Teodorescu married pianist Henrik Måwe at Lund Cathedral, after which she also assumed his surname.
