= Ruth Firmenich =

German politician (born 1964)

Ruth Firmenich MEP
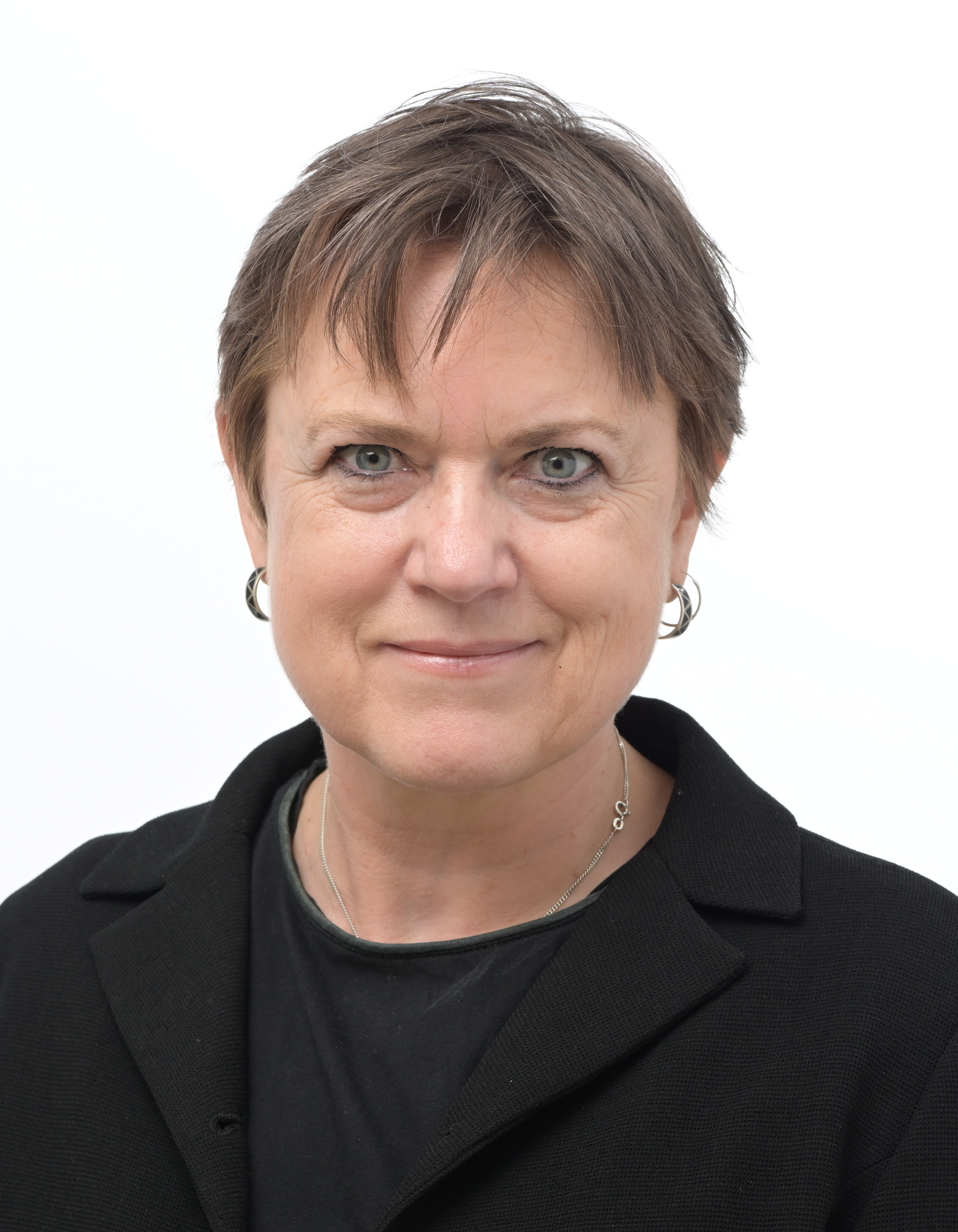

Member of the European Parliament for Germany
- Incumbent
- Assumed office 16 July 2024

Personal details
- Born: Ruth Christina Margarete Firmenich; 1964 (age 61–62) Cologne, West Germany
- Party: BSW (since 2024)
- Other political affiliations: Die Linke (2007-2024); PDS (until 2007)
- Education: University of Bonn

Ruth Christina Margarete Firmenich (born 1964) is a German politician from Bündnis Sahra Wagenknecht. In the 2024 European Parliament election she was elected a Member of the European Parliament (MEP).

== Life ==
Ruth Firmenich was born in Cologne in 1964. She studied political science, American studies and German studies at the University of Bonn from 1988 to 1998.

From 1995 to 1998 she worked as an assistant to Steffen Tippach, and from 1998 to 2000 as a research assistant to Fred Gebhardt. From 2000 to 2002 she worked as a human rights and Europe advisor for the Party of Democratic Socialism. From 2003 to 2004 she was a research assistant to MEP Feleknas Uca. She was president of the European Parliament Assistants Association (EPAA). Since 2004, Firmenich has worked for Sahra Wagenknecht, initially as a research assistant and since 2009 as head of her Bundestag office in Berlin. From 2012 she was an executive officer, a member of the federal committee until 2016 and a member of the federal executive board of Die Linke until 2018.

In the European elections in 2009 and 2014, she ran unsuccessfully as a candidate for the Die Linke on list position 13. In 2024, she left Die Linke and became a founding member of the Bündnis Sahra Wagenknecht. In the 2024 European elections, Firmenich was elected to the European Parliament as fourth place on BSW's list.

== See also ==
- List of members of the European Parliament (2024–2029)
