= List of members of the European Parliament for France, 1994–1999 =

Members of the European Parliament from France
ECSC delegation	(1952)
EP delegation	(1958)
1st term	(1979)
2nd term	(1984)
3rd term	(1989)
4th term	(1994)
5th term	(1999)
6th term	(2004)
7th term	(2009)
8th term	(2014)
9th term	(2019)
10th term	(2024)

This is a list of the members of the European Parliament for France in the 1994 to 1999 session.

== List ==
Name	National party	EP Group	Constituency
Sylviane Ainardi	Communist Party	GUE/NGL	
Francis Wurtz	Communist Party	GUE/NGL	
Philippe Herzog	Communist Party	GUE/NGL	
Gisèle Moreau	Communist Party	GUE/NGL	
René Piquet (until 30 April 1997) Jean Querbes	Communist Party	GUE/NGL	
Mireille Elmalan	Communist Party	GUE/NGL	
Aline Pailler	Communist Party	GUE/NGL	
Jean-Marie Le Pen	National Front	NI	
Bruno Mégret	National Front	NI	
Bruno Gollnisch	National Front	NI	
Jean-Claude Martinez	National Front	NI	
Carl Lang	National Front	NI	
Marie-France Stirbois	National Front	NI	
Bernard Antony	National Front	NI	
Yvan Blot	National Front	NI	
Jean-Marie Le Chevallier	National Front	NI	
Fernand Le Rachinel	National Front	NI	
Jean-Yves Le Gallou	National Front	NI	
Bernard Tapie (until 4 February 1997) Michel-Ange Scarbonchi (from 5 February 1997)	Movement of Radicals of the Left (until 4 February 1997) Radical Socialist Party	ERA	
Jean-François Hory	Radical Energy (until 11 March 1996) Radical Party	ERA	
Catherine Lalumière	Radical Energy	ERA	
Christiane Taubira-Delannon	Radical Energy	ERA	
Noël Mamère (until 11 August 1997) Henri de Lassus Saint-Geniès (from 13 August 1997)	Radical Energy (until 11 August 1997) Radical Socialist Party	ERA (until 30 December 1996) G (until 11 August 1997) ERA	
Michel Dary	Movement of Radicals of the Left	ERA	
André Sainjon	Movement of Radicals of the Left (until 11 March 1996) Radical Party	ERA	
Bernard Castagnède	Movement of Radicals of the Left	ERA	
Odile Leperre-Verrier	Movement of Radicals of the Left	ERA	
Pierre Pradier	Movement of Radicals of the Left (until 11 March 1996) Radical Party	ERA	
Christine Barthet-Mayer	Radical Energy	ERA	
Dominique Saint-Pierre	Movement of Radicals of the Left (until 11 March 1996) Radical Party	ERA	
Antoinette Fouque	Radical Energy	ERA (until 16 July 1996) PES	
Philippe de Villiers (until 15 June 1997) Éric Pinel	Union for French Democracy - Republican Party (until 15 June 1997) Movement for France	EN (until 10 November 1996) NI (until 12 January 1997) I-EN (until 12 May 1998) NI	
Jimmy Goldsmith (until 19 July 1997) Stéphane Buffetaut	Majority for a Different Europe (until 19 July 1997) Movement for France	EN (until 10 November 1996) NI (until 12 January 1997) I-EN	
Charles de Gaulle	Majority for a Different Europe	EN (until 10 November 1996) NI (until 12 January 1997) I-EN (until 18 April 1999) NI	
Thierry Jean-Pierre	Majority for a Different Europe	EN (until 10 November 1996) NI (until 12 January 1997) I-EN (until 18 November 1998) EPP	
Philippe Martin	Majority for a Different Europe (until 14 April 1996) Rally for the Republic	EN (until 14 April 1996) UPE	
Françoise Seillier	Majority for a Different Europe	EN (until 10 November 1996) NI (until 12 January 1997) I-EN	
Georges Berthu	Majority for a Different Europe	EN (until 10 November 1996) NI (until 12 January 1997) I-EN	
Hervé Fabre-Aubrespy	Majority for a Different Europe	EN (until 10 November 1996) NI (until 12 January 1997) I-EN	
Dominique Souchet	Majority for a Different Europe	EN (until 10 November 1996) NI (until 12 January 1997) I-EN	
Anne-Christine Poisson	Majority for a Different Europe	EN (until 31 October 1996) UPE	
Frédéric Striby	Majority for a Different Europe	EN (until 10 November 1996) NI (until 12 January 1997) I-EN	
Édouard des Places	Rally for the Republic	EN (until 10 November 1996) NI (12 January 1997) I-EN	
Marie-France de Rose	Majority for a Different Europe	EN (until 10 November 1996) NI (until 12 January 1997) I-EN (until 1 December 1998) EPP	
Michel Rocard	Socialist Party	PES	
Catherine Trautmann (until 5 June 1997) Georges Garot	Socialist Party	PES	
Bernard Kouchner (until 5 June 1997) Marie-Noëlle Lienemann (from 6 June 1997)	Socialist Party	PES (31 December 1996) ERA (until 5 June 1997) PES	
Danielle Darras	Socialist Party	PES	
André Laignel	Socialist Party	PES	
Nicole Péry (until 14 July 1997) Marie-José Denys (from 17 July 1997)	Socialist Party	PES	
Jack Lang (until 31 July 1997) Henri Weber (from 2 August 1997 until 17 September 1997) Marie-Thérèse Mutin (from 18 September 1997)	Socialist Party	PES	
Frédérique Bredin (until 19 July 1996) Marie-Arlette Carlotti (from 20 July 1997)	Socialist Party	PES	
Pierre Moscovici (until 5 June 1997) Olivier Duhamel (from 6 June 1997)	Socialist Party	PES	
Élisabeth Guigou (until 5 June 1997) Jean-Louis Cottigny (from 6 June 1997)	Socialist Party	PES	
Jean-Pierre Cot	Socialist Party	PES	
Pervenche Berès	Socialist Party	PES	
François Bernardini	Socialist Party	PES	
Michèle Lindeperg	Socialist Party	PES	
Gérard Caudron	Socialist Party	PES	
Dominique Baudis (until 2 October 1997) Roger Karoutchi (from 3 October 1999)	Union for French Democracy - Centre of Social Democrats (until 16 June 1996) Union for French Democracy - Democratic Force (until 2 October 1997) Rally for the Republic	EPP (until 2 October 1997) UPE	
Hélène Carrère d'Encausse	Rally for the Republic	EDA (until 4 July 1995) UPE	
Yves Galland (until 18 May 1995) Jean-Thomas Nordmann (from 19 May 1995)	Union for French Democracy - Radical Party (until 18 May 1995)	ELDR	
Christian Jacob (31 August 1997) Pierre Lataillade (19 July 1999)	Rally for the Republic	EDA (until 4 July 1995) UPE	
Jean-Pierre Raffarin (18 May 1995) Jean-Antoine Giansily (from 19 May 1995)	Union for French Democracy - Republican Party (until 18 May 1995) National Centre of Independents	EPP (until 18 May 1995) EDA (until 4 July 1995) UPE	
Armelle Guinebertière	Rally for the Republic	EDA (until 4 July 1995) UPE	
Nicole Fontaine	Union for French Democracy - Centre of Social Democrats (until 16 June 1996) Union for French Democracy - Democratic Force (until 2 October 1997)	EPP	
Alain Pompidou	Rally for the Republic	EDA (until 4 July 1995) UPE	
Yves Verwaerde	Union for French Democracy - Republican Party (until 15 May 1998) Liberal Democracy	EPP	
Marie-Thérèse Hermange	Rally for the Republic	EDA (until 4 July 1995) UPE	
Jean-Louis Bourlanges	Union for French Democracy	EPP	
Jacques Donnay	Rally for the Republic	EDA (until 4 July 1995) UPE	
Françoise Grossetête	Union for French Democracy - Republican Party (until 21 June 1998) Union for French Democracy - Liberal Democracy (until 11 March 1999) Liberal Democracy	EPP	
Blaise Aldo	Rally for the Republic	EDA (until 4 July 1995) UPE	
Robert Hersant (until 21 April 1996) André Fourçans (from 22 April 1996)	Union for French Democracy - Perspectives and Realities Clubs (until 21 October 1995) Union for French Democracy - Popular Party for French Democracy (until 21 April 1996) Union for French Democracy	EPP	
Anne-Marie Schaffner	Rally for the Republic	EDA (until 4 July 1995) UPE	
Francis Decourrière	Social Democratic Party (until 16 November 1996) Union for French Democracy - Democratic Force	EPP	
Christian Cabrol	Rally for the Republic	EDA (until 4 July 1995) UPE	
Bernard Stasi (until 24 April 1998) Bernard Lehideux (from 25 April 1998)	Union for French Democracy - Centre of Social Democrats (until 16 June 1996) Union for French Democracy - Democratic Force (until 24 April 1998) Union for French Democracy - Liberal Democracy	EPP	
Jean-Claude Pasty	Rally for the Republic	EDA (until 4 July 1995) UPE	
André Soulier	Union for French Democracy - Republican Party (until 8 December 1997) Union for French Democracy - Liberal Democracy	EPP	
Jean-Pierre Bazin	Rally for the Republic	EDA (until 4 July 1995) UPE	
Pierre Bernard-Reymond	Union for French Democracy - Centre of Social Democrats (until 16 June 1996) Union for French Democracy - Democratic Force (until 24 April 1998)	EPP	
Raymond Chesa	Rally for the Republic	EDA (until 4 July 1995) UPE (28 December 1998) I-EN	
Georges de Brémond d'Ars	Union for French Democracy - Perspectives and Realities Clubs (until 21 October 1995) Union for French Democracy - Popular Party for French Democracy	EPP	
Jean Baggioni	Rally for the Republic	EDA (until 4 July 1995) UPE	
Jean-Pierre Bébéar	Union for French Democracy - Republican Party (until 15 May 1998) Liberal Democracy	EPP	
Gérard d'Aboville	Rally for the Republic	EDA (until 4 July 1995) UPE	
