= List of members of the European Parliament for the Netherlands, 1994–1999 =

Below is a list of the 31 members of the European Parliament for the Netherlands in the 1994 to 1999 session.

== Party representation ==
National party	EP Group	Seats	±
Christian Democratic Appeal	EPP	10 / 31	0
Labour Party	PES	8 / 31	0
People's Party for Freedom and Democracy	ELDR	6 / 31	3 ▲
Democrats 66	ELDR	4 / 31	3 ▲
SGP, GPV and RPF	EN /I-EN	2 / 31	1 ▲
GreenLeft	G–EFA	1 / 31	1 ▼

== Mutations ==
=== 1994 ===
- 9 June: Election for the European Parliament in the Netherlands.
- 19 July: The Europe of Nations Group (EN) was founded and Reformed Political Party and Reformed Political League join.
- 19 July: Begin 4th European Parliament session. (1994–1999)

=== 1996 ===
- 10 November: Europe of Nations Group (EN) dissolves
- 2 December: Jim Janssen van Raaij leaves the Christian Democratic Appeal party and continues as an independent.
- 20 December: The Independents for a Europe of Nations group (I-EN) was founded and Reformed Political Party, Reformed Political League and Reformatory Political Federation join.

=== 1997 ===
- 1 September: Leen van der Waal (SGP, GPV and RPF) leaves the European Parliament. In his place Rijk van Dam is installed the same day.

=== 1998 ===
- 3 August: Gijs de Vries (VVD) leaves the European Parliament, because he became an undersecretary in the Second Kok cabinet.
- 30 September: Robert Jan Goedbloed (VVD) is installed in the European Parliament as a replacement for Gijs de Vries
- 1 September: Nel van Dijk (GL) leaves the European Parliament. In her place Joost Lagendijk is installed the same day.

=== 1999 ===
- 8 June: Laurens Jan Brinkhorst (D66) leaves the European Parliament, because he became a minister in the Second Kok cabinet. (no successor was installed, because it's days before the end of this parliament session.)

== Alphabetical ==
MEPs for the Netherlands elected to the 4th European Parliament session
1994–1999
Name	Sex	National party	EP Group	Period	Preference vote
Hedy d'Ancona	Female	Labour Party	PES	19 July 1994 – July 1999	
Jan-Willem Bertens	Male	Democrats 66	ELDR	24 July 1989 – 20 July 1999	
Leonie van Bladel	Female	Labour Party	PES	19 July 1994 – 20 July 1999	
Hans Blokland	Male	Reformed Political Alliance	EN /I-EN	19 July 1994 – 14 July 2009	
Johanna Boogerd-Quaak	Female	Democrats 66	ELDR	5 February 2003 – 20 July 2004	
Laurens Jan Brinkhorst	Male	Democrats 66	ELDR	19 July 1994 – 8 June 1999	
Frits Castricum	Male	Labour Party	PES	19 July 1994 – 20 July 1999	
Pam Cornelissen	Male	Christian Democratic Appeal	EPP	24 July 1984 – 20 July 1999	
Rijk van Dam	Male	Reformatory Political Federation	I-EN	September 1997 – 20 July 2004	
Piet Dankert	Male	Labour Party	PES	19 July 1994 – 20 July 1999	
Nel van Dijk	Female	GreenLeft	G	January 1987 – 1 September 1998	
Doeke Eisma	Male	Democrats 66	ELDR	19 July 1994 – 20 July 1999	
Robert Jan Goedbloed	Male	People's Party for Freedom and Democracy	ELDR	September 1998 – 20 July 1999	
Elly Plooij-van Gorsel	Female	People's Party for Freedom and Democracy	ELDR	19 July 1994 – 20 July 2004	
Joost Lagendijk	Male	GreenLeft	G	1 September 1998 – 14 July 2009	
Jessica Larive	Female	People's Party for Freedom and Democracy	ELDR	24 July 1984 – 20 July 1999	
Hanja Maij-Weggen	Female	Christian Democratic Appeal	EPP	19 July 1994 – 1 October 2003	
Alman Metten	Male	Labour Party	PES	24 July 1984 – 20 July 1999	
Jan Mulder	Male	People's Party for Freedom and Democracy	ELDR	19 July 1994 – 14 July 2009; 22 June 2010 – 1 July 2014	
Ria Oomen-Ruijten	Female	Christian Democratic Appeal	EPP	25 July 1989 – 1 July 2014	
Arie Oostlander	Male	Christian Democratic Appeal	EPP	25 July 1989 – 20 July 2004	
Karla Peijs	Female	Christian Democratic Appeal	EPP	25 July 1989 – 27 May 2003	
Peter Pex	Male	Christian Democratic Appeal	EPP	19 July 1994 – 20 July 1999	
Bartho Pronk	Male	Christian Democratic Appeal	EPP	20 November 1989 – 20 July 2004	
Maartje van Putten	Female	Labour Party	PES	25 July 1989 – 20 July 1999	
Jim Janssen van Raaij	Male	Christian Democratic Appeal	EPP	17 July 1979 – 24 July 1984; October 1986 – 20 July 1999	
Jan Sonneveld	Male	Christian Democratic Appeal	EPP	25 July 1989 – 20 July 1999	
Wim van Velzen	Male	Labour Party	PES	25 July 1989 – 20 July 1999	
Wim van Velzen	Male	Christian Democratic Appeal	EPP	19 July 1994 – 20 July 2004	
Gijs de Vries	Male	People's Party for Freedom and Democracy	ELDR	24 July 1984 – 2 August 1998	
Leen van der Waal	Male	Reformed Political Party	EN /I-EN	24 July 1984 – 2 September 1997	
Jan-Kees Wiebenga	Male	People's Party for Freedom and Democracy	ELDR	19 July 1994 – October 2001	
Jan Marinus Wiersma	Male	Labour Party	PES	19 July 1994 – 14 July 2009	
Florus Wijsenbeek	Male	People's Party for Freedom and Democracy	ELDR	24 July 1984 – 20 July 1999	
