= 1999 European Parliament election =

- 10–13 June 1999

All 626 seats to the European Parliament 314 seats needed for a majority
- Turnout: 49.8% (▼7.0 pp)
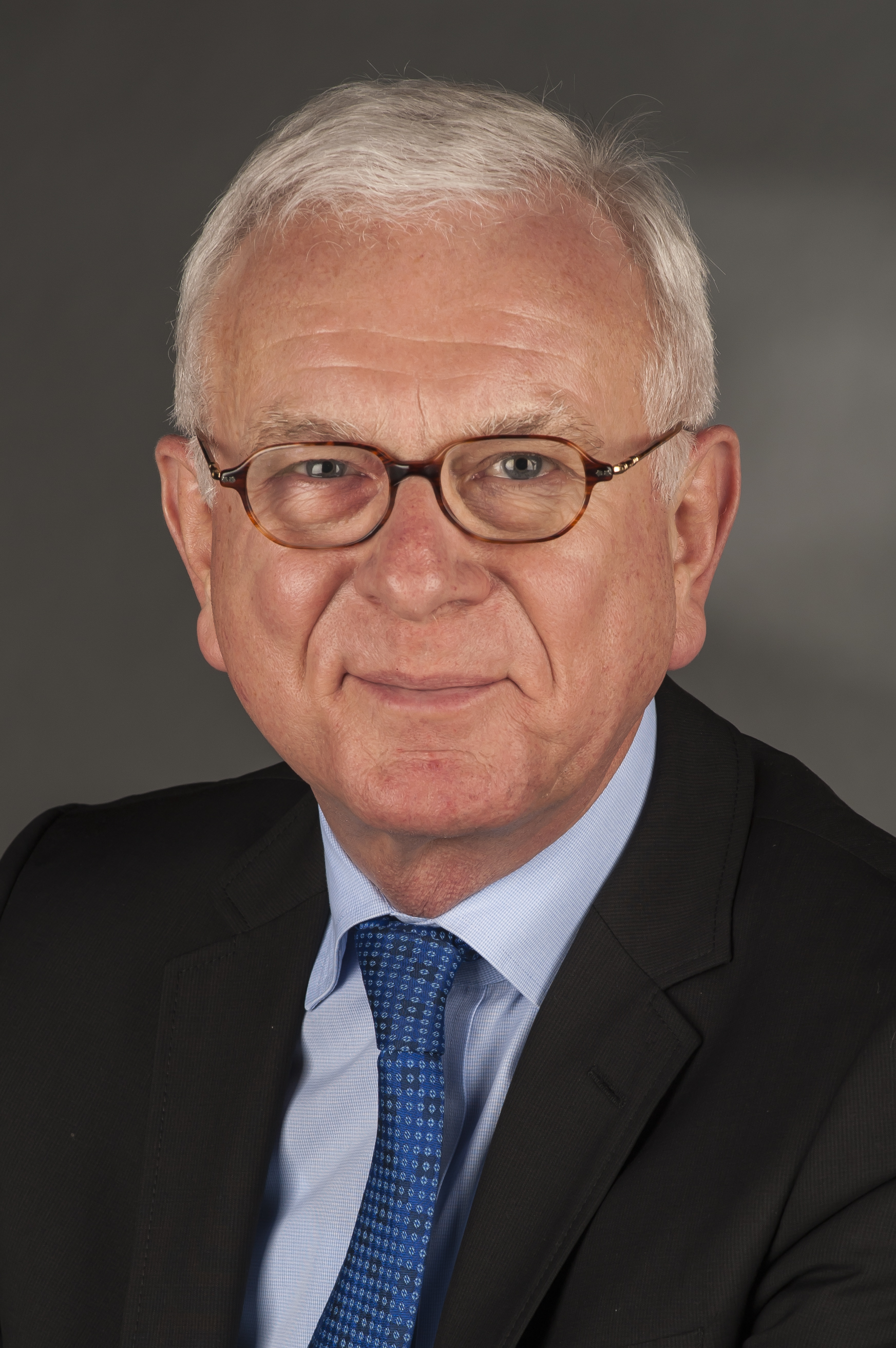

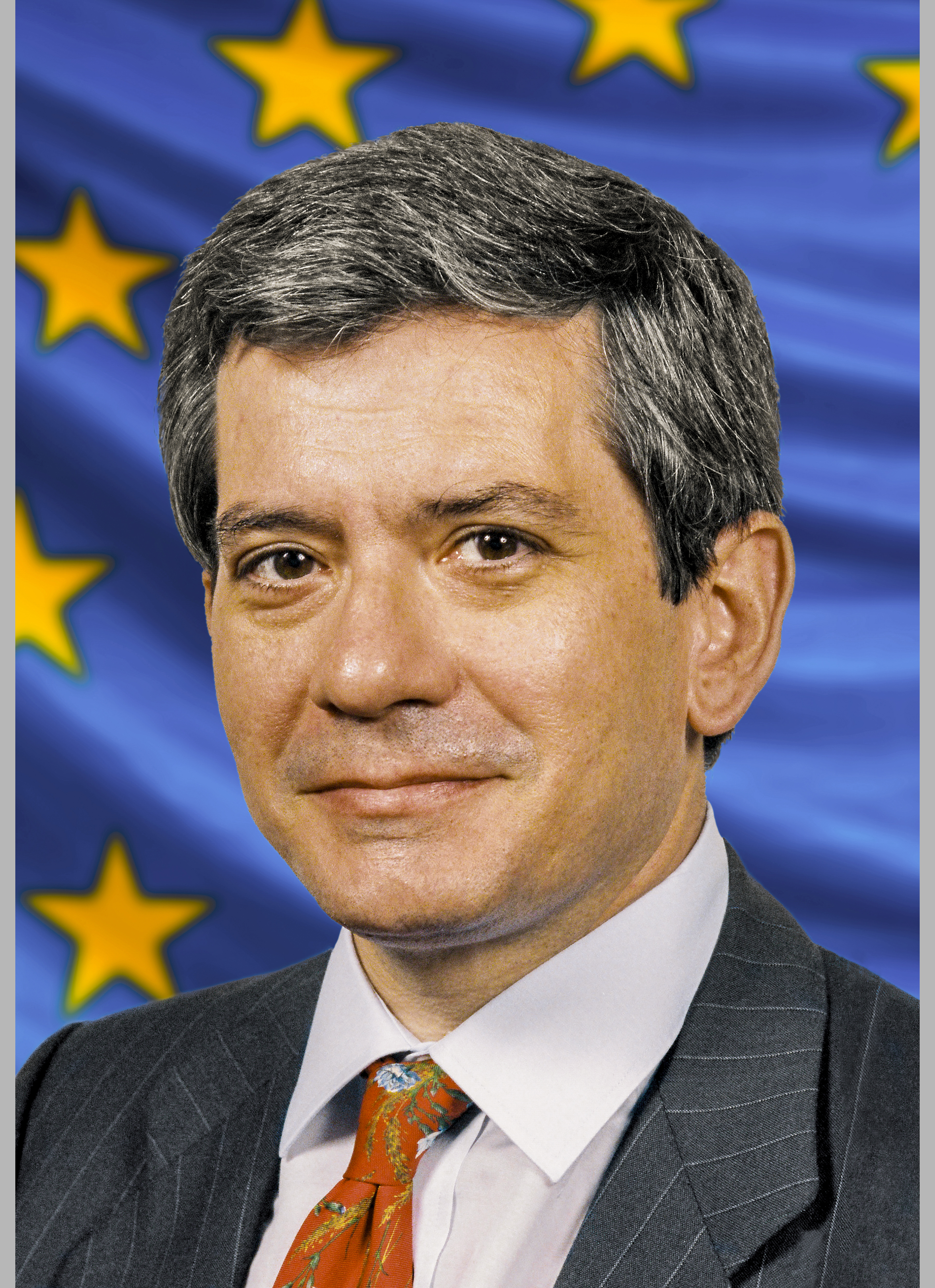

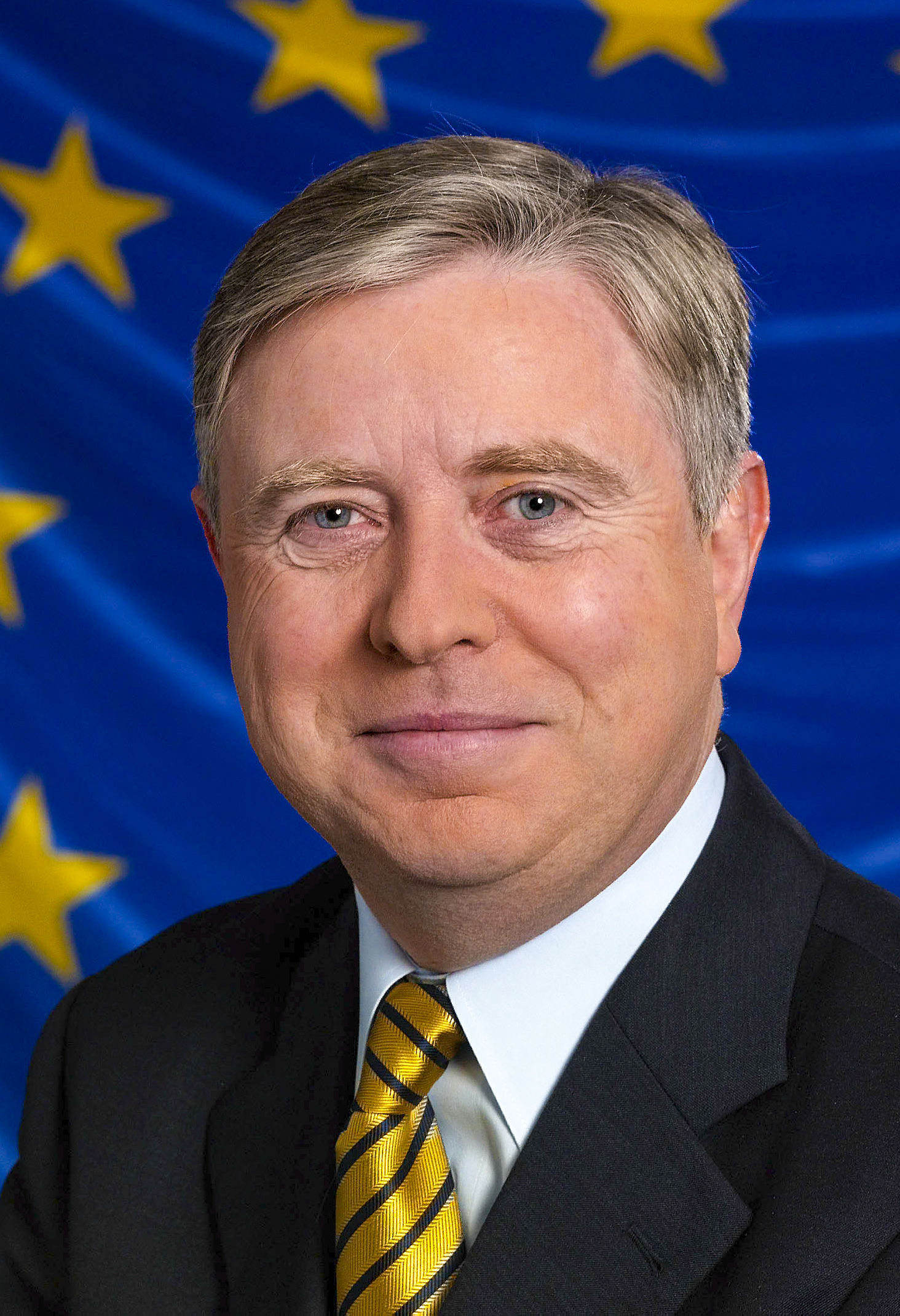

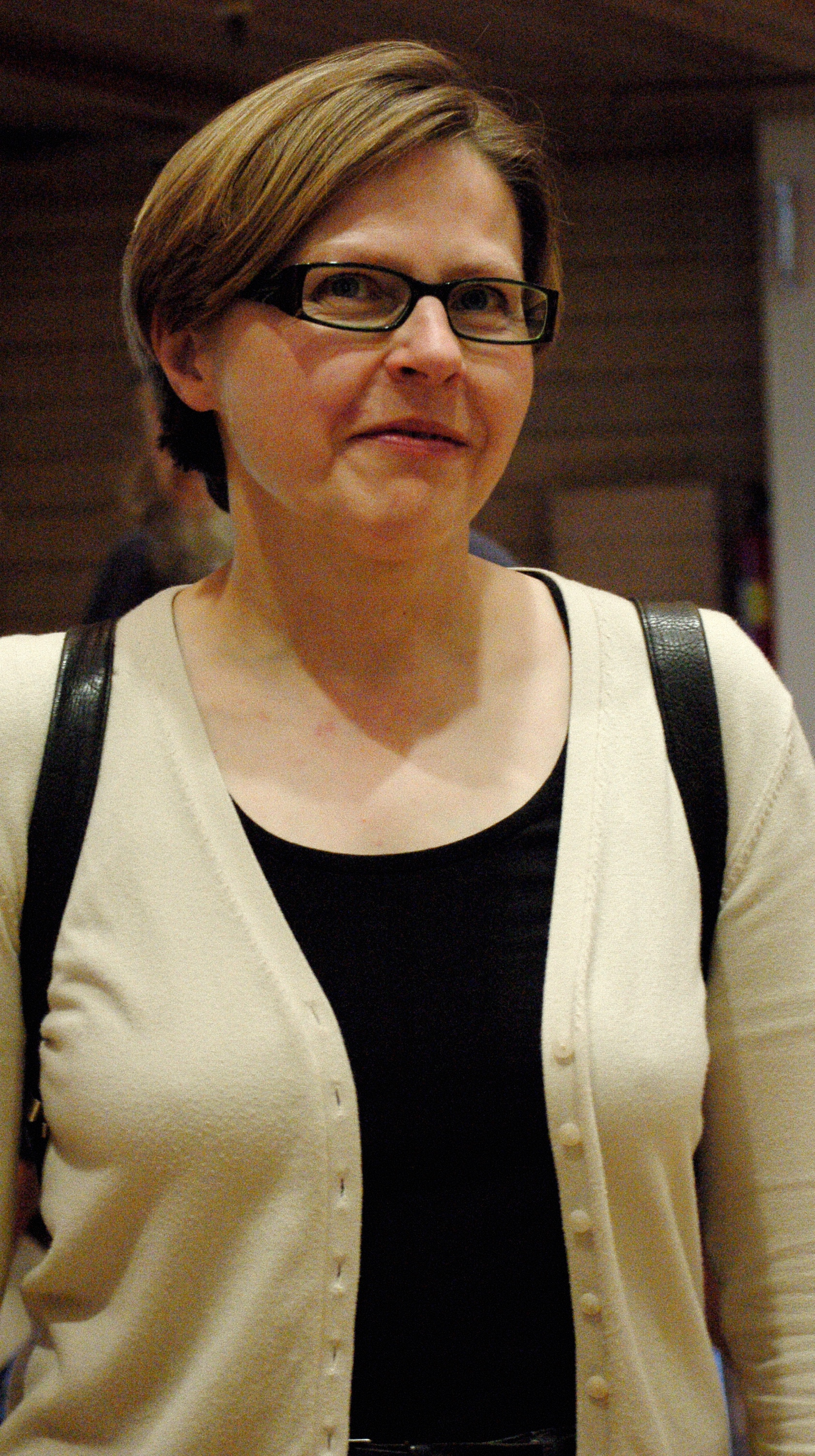

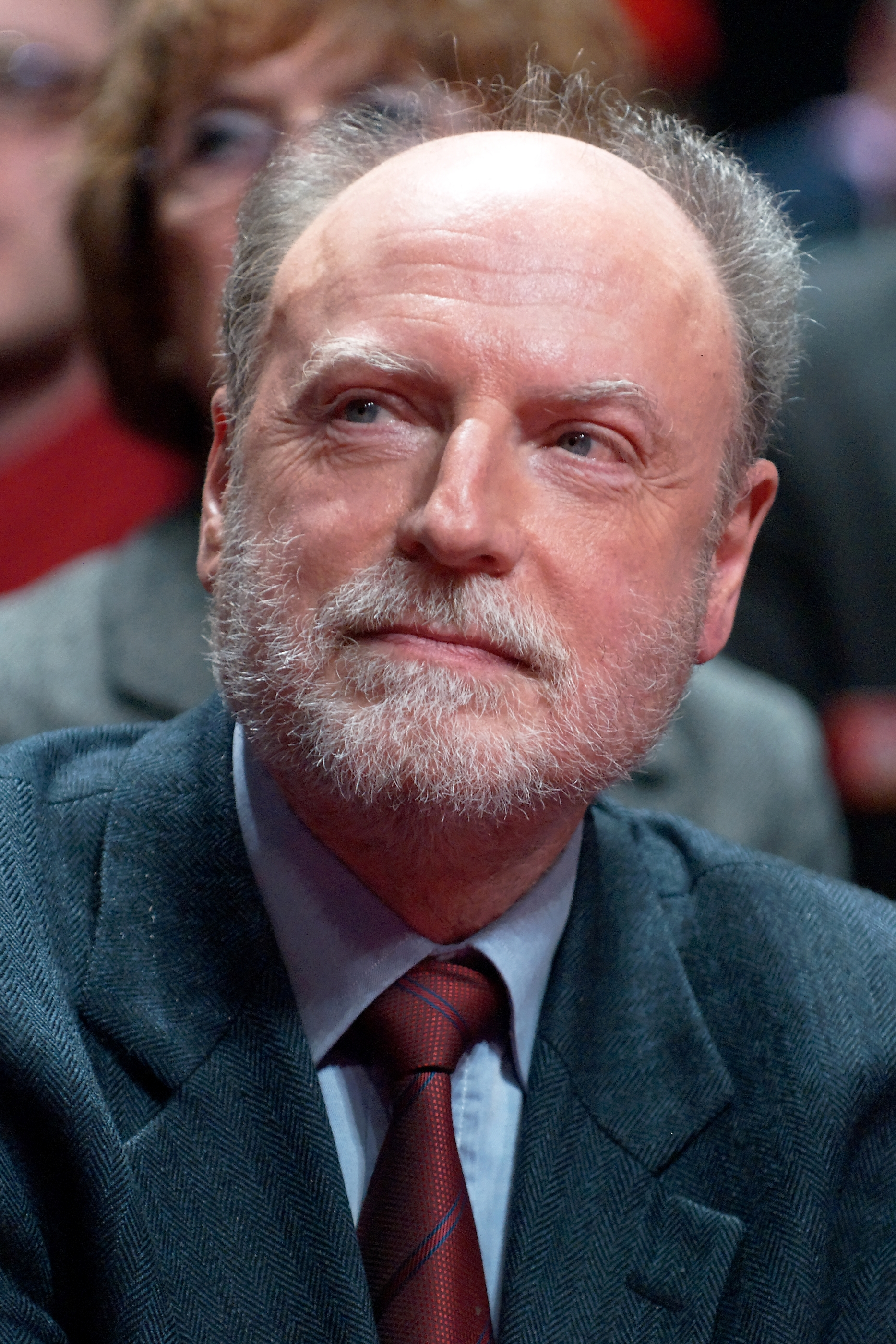

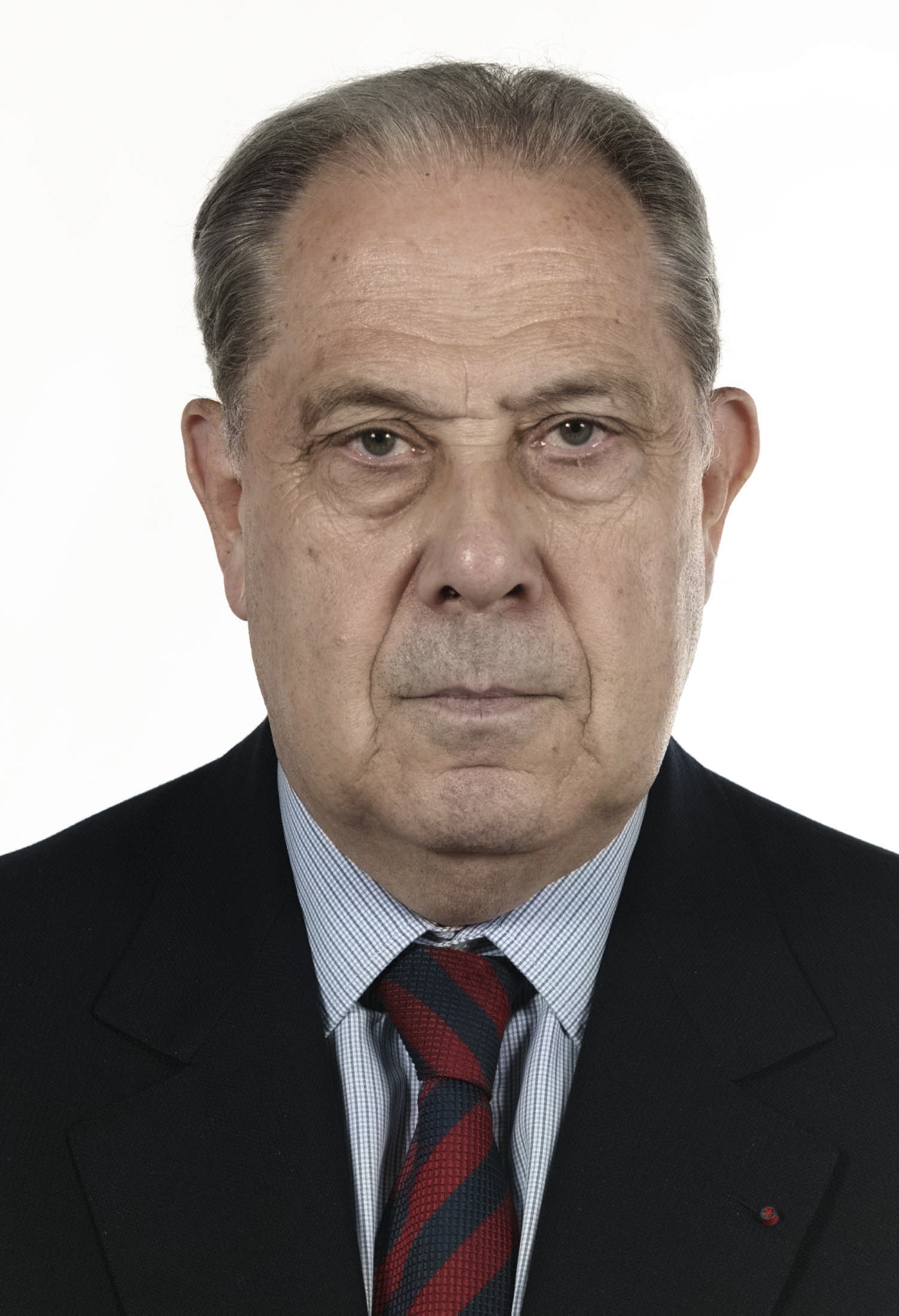
	First party	Second party	Third party
Leader	Hans-Gert Pöttering	Enrique Barón Crespo	Pat Cox
Party	EPP–ED	PES	ELDR
Leader's seat	Germany	Spain	Munster
Last election	157, 27.7%	198, 34.9%	43, 7.6%
Seats won	233*	180*	50*
Seat change	▲76	▼18	▲18
Percentage	37.2%	28.8%	8.0%
Swing	▲9.5%	▼6.1%	▲0.4%
	Fourth party	Fifth party	Sixth party
Leader	Heidi Hautala	Francis Wurtz	Charles Pasqua
Party	Greens/EFA	GUE/NGL	UEN
Leader's seat	Finland	Île-de-France	France
Last election	23, 4.1%	28, 4.9%	26, 4.6%
Seats won	48	42*	30
Seat change	▲25	▲14	▲4
Percentage	7.7%	6.7%	4.8
Swing	▲3.6%	▲1.8%	▲0.2%
- Post-election composition of each member state's delegation
President of the European Parliament before election
José María Gil-Robles
EPP
President of the European Parliament after election
Nicole Fontaine
EPP–ED

The 1999 European Parliament election was a European election for all 626 members of the European Parliament held across the 15 European Union member states on 10, 11 and 13 June 1999. The voter turn-out was generally low, except in Belgium and Luxembourg, where voting is compulsory and where national elections were held that same day. This was the first election where Austria, Finland and Sweden voted alongside the other member states, having joined in 1995 and voted separately. The next election was held in 2004.

== Final results ==
European Parliament election, 1999 - Final results at 20 July 1999
Group	Description	Chaired by	MEPs		
EPP-ED	Conservatives and Christian Democrats	Hans-Gert Pöttering	233		
PES	Social Democrats	Enrique Barón Crespo	180		
ELDR	Liberals and Liberal Democrats	Pat Cox	50		
G–EFA	Greens and Regionalists	Heidi Hautala; Paul Lannoye	48		
EUL–NGL	Communists and the Far left	Francis Wurtz	42		
UEN	National Conservatives	Charles Pasqua	31		
EDD	Eurosceptics	Jens-Peter Bonde	16		
TGI	Mixed	Gianfranco Dell'Alba; Francesco Speroni	18		
NI	Independents and Far right	none	8	Total: 626	Sources:

Seats summary
EPP–ED	37.22%
PES	28.75%
ELDR	7.99%
G–EFA	7.67%
GUE/NGL	6.71%
UEN	4.95%
TGI	2.88%
EDD	2.56%
NI	1.28%

== Results by country ==
The national results as at 13 June 1999 are as follows:

Group Nation	EPP-ED	PES	ELDR	Greens-ALE	GUE-NGL	UEN	EDD	NI	Total
Austria	7 ÖVP 30,7%	7 SPÖ 31,7%		2 GRÜNEN 9,3%				5 FPÖ 23,4%	21
Belgium	3 CVP 13,5% 1 PSC 5,2% 1 CSP 0,1%	3 PS 9,7% 2 SP 8,8%	3 VLD 13,6% 2 PRL 10,2% 1 FDF	3 ECOLO 8,6% 2 AGALEV 7,5% 2 VU 7,6%				2 VB 9,4%	25
Denmark	1 KF 8,5%	3 S 16,5%	5 V 23,4% 1 B 9,1%	1 SF 7,1%		1 DF 5,8%	3 JB 16,1% 1 N 7,3%		16
Finland	4 KOK 25,3% 1 SKL 2,4%	3 SDP 17,9%	4 KESK 21,3% 1 SF 6,8%	2 Vihr. 13,4%	1 Vasem. 9,1%				15
France	12 RPR 12,8% 9 UDF 9,3%	22 PS 22,0%		9 Verts 9,7%	6 PCF 6,8% 5 LO-LCR 5,2%	13 RPF 13,1%	6 CPNT 6,8%	5 FN 5,7%	87
Germany	43 CDU 39,3% 10 CSU 9,4%	33 SPD 30,7%		7 Greens 6,4%	6 PDS 5,8%				99
Greece	9 ND 36,0%	9 PASOK 32,9%			3 KKE 8,7% 2 DIKKI 6,9% 2 Synaspismos 5,2%				25
Ireland	4 FG 24,6% 1 Ind.	1 Lab 8,7%	1 Ind.	2 GP 6,7%		6 FF 38,6%			15
Italy	22 FI 25,2% 4 PPI 4,53% 2 CCD 2,6% 2 CDU 2,2% 1 UDEUR 1,6% 1 PP 0,8% 1 RI 1,1% 1 SVP 0,5%	15 DS 17,4% 2 SDI 2,2%	6 DEM 7,7% 1 PRI 0,5%	2 FdV 1,8%	4 PRC 4,3% 2 PdCI 2,0%	9 AN–PS 10,3%		7 LB 8,5% 4 LN 4,5% 1 FT 1,6%	87
Luxembourg	2 CSV 31,7%	2 LSAP 23,6%	1 DP 20,5%	1 Gréng 10,7%					6
Netherlands	9 CDA 26,9%	6 PvdA 20,1%	6 VVD19,7% 2 D66 5,8%	4 GL 11,9%	1 SP 5,0%		3 SGP-GPV-RPF 8,7%		31
Portugal	9 PSD 32,14%	12 PS 44,55%			2 CDU (PCP) 10,7%	2 PP 8,4%			25
Spain	27 PP 40,4% 1 CiU (UDC)	24 PSOE 35,9%	2 CiU (CDC); 1 CE: CC	1 CN (EA); 1 CN (PNV); 1 CE (PA); 1 BNG 1,7%	4 IU 5,9%			1 EH 1,5%	63
Sweden	5 M 20,8% 2 KD 7,6%	6 S 26,0%	3 FP 13,8% 1 C 6,0%	2 MP 9,5%	3 V 15,8%				22
United Kingdom	36 CON 33,5% 1 UUP 1,1%	29 LAB 26,3% 1 SDLP 1,8%	10 LD 11,9%	2 GPEW 5,9% 2 SNP 2,5% 2 PC 1,7%			3 UKIP 6,5%	1 DUP 1,8%	87
Total	233	180	50	48	42	31	16	26	626
Group	PPE	PSE	ELDR	Greens-ALE	GUE-NGL	UEN	EDD	NI	

== Results by group ==
=== Communists/Far Left ===
The EUL/NGL group picked up one seat in the election and seven in the subsequent regrouping, raising its total from 34 to 42.

=== Social Democrats ===
The PES group did badly, losing 34 of its seats in the election and slipping to the second-biggest group.

=== Liberals/Liberal Democrats ===
The ELDR group did moderately well, picking up one seat in the election and seven in the regrouping, giving a total of 50 seats and retaining its place as the third biggest group. The European Radical Alliance (ERA) were not so fortunate and slipped badly, losing eight of its 21 members in the election.

=== Conservatives/Christian Democrats ===
The EPP group did well, picking up 23 seats in the election and nine in the regrouping, giving a total of 233 seats and overtaking the left to become the biggest group. To placate the increasingly eurosceptic British Conservatives, the group was renamed "EPP-ED" for the new Parliament, partly resurrecting the name of the former European Democrat group which was merged with the EPP in 1992.

=== National Conservatives ===
The Union for Europe (UFE) group slipped during the election and lost 17 seats. The group split during the regrouping, with Ireland's Fianna Fáil and Portugal's CDS/PP forming a new group called "Union for Europe of the Nations". UEN started the Fifth Parliament with 31 MEPs.

=== Far-Right Nationalists ===
No explicitly far-right group per se was in existence immediately before or after the election. All far-right MEPs that were elected sat as independents (see below).

=== Greens/Regionalists ===
The Green Group solidified its position, picking up 11 seats in the election to give it 38 MEPs. The European Free Alliance members of the ERA joined with the Green Group to create the Greens/EFA group, which started the Fifth Parliament with 48 MEPs.

=== Eurosceptics ===
The I-EN group trod water, gaining six members in the election but losing five in the regrouping, leaving it with 16 members. The group was renamed "Europe of Democracies and Diversities" (EDD) for the new Parliament.

=== Independents ===
The Non-Inscrits did badly, losing 20 MEPs to the election. Disparate members (two from Belgium, five from France and eleven from Italy) tried to gain Group privilege by creating a group called the "Technical Group of Independent Members" (full title "Group for the technical co-ordination of groups and the defence of independent members", abbreviated to "TGI" or "TDI"). The attempt initially succeeded, with the group allowed to start the Fifth Parliament until the legal position could be checked. In September, the Constitutional Affairs Committee ruled that they lacked a coherent position ("political affinity", the basis for forming a group) and were disbanded - the only group ever to be forcibly dissolved. The TGI members returned to the Non-Inscrits, increasing their number to 27.

== See also ==
- Members of the European Parliament 1999–2004

== Statistics ==
European Parliament election, 1999 - Statistics
Area	European Union (EU-15)	Sources
Dates	Thursday 10 June: Netherlands, United Kingdom, Denmark; Friday 11 June: Ireland; Sunday 13 June: Austria, Belgium, Finland, France, Germany, Greece, Italy, Luxembourg, Portugal, Spain, Sweden	
Seats	626	
Candidates	over 10,000	
Electorate	288 million	
Turnout	49.8%	
Previous	1994 European Parliament election	n/a
Next	2004 European Parliament election	n/a
Election methods	All proportional representation.	
Preference voting allowed?	Yes, via open list: Austria, Belgium, Denmark, Finland, Italy, Luxembourg (with panachage), Netherlands, Sweden.; Yes, via STV: Ireland, United Kingdom (NI only); No: the rest	
Cutoff?	5%: France, Germany; 4%: Austria, Sweden; 3%: Greece; none: the rest	
Seat allocation	Sainte-Laguë method: Sweden; STV method: Ireland, United Kingdom (NI only); Hare-Niemeyer method: Germany; Pro-rata: Greece; Largest remainder method: Italy; D'Hondt method: the rest	
Constituency boundaries	Member state subdivided into multiple constituencies: Belgium (3), Ireland (4), Italy (5), United Kingdom (12); Mixture: Germany (candidate lists at Länder or national level), Finland (candidate lists at electoral district or national level); Member state as single constituency: the rest	
Minimum voting age	18	

European Parliament election, 1999 - Timeline
Fourth Parliament		1999 Election		Regrouping		Fifth Parliament				
Groups	Pre-elections May 5	Change	Results June 13	Change	Results July 20	New Groups	First session July 20	Break up of TGI Sept 13	New Groups	New session Sept 13
EPP	201	+23	224	+9	233	EPP-ED	233	+0	EPP-ED	233
PES	214	-34	180	+0	180	PES	180	+0	PES	180
ELDR	42	+1	43	+7	50	ELDR	50	+0	ELDR	50
ERA	21	-8	13	-3	48	G/EFA	48	+0	G/EFA	48
G	27	+11	38	-3	48	G/EFA	48	+0	G/EFA	48
EUL-NGL	34	+1	35	+7	42	EUL-NGL	42	+0	EUL-NGL	42
I-EN	15	+6	21	-5	16	EDD	16	+0	EDD	16
NI	38	-20	18	-10	8	NI	8	+19	NI	27
Others	0	+37	37	-19	18	TGI	18	-18	NI	27
UFE	34	-17	17	+14	31	UEN	31	-1	UEN	30
Total	626	0	626	0	626	Total	626	0	Total	626

European Parliament election, 1999 - Delegation at 20 July 1999
Group	Description	Details	%	MEPs
EPP-ED	Conservatives and christian democrats	Germany 53, Belgium 5, Denmark 1, France 21, Ireland 5, Italy 34, Luxembourg 2, Netherlands 9, UK 37, Greece 9, Spain 29, Portugal 9, Austria 7, Finland 5, Sweden 5	37%	233
PES	Social democrats	Germany 33, Belgium 5, Denmark 3, France 22, Ireland 1, Italy 17, Luxembourg 2, Netherlands 6, UK 30, Greece 9, Spain 24, Portugal 12, Austria 7, Finland 3, Sweden 6	29%	180
ELDR	Liberals and liberal democrats	Belgium 5, Denmark 6, Ireland 1, Italy 7, Luxembourg 1, Netherlands 8, UK 10, Spain 3, Finland 5, Sweden 4	8%	50
G/EFA	Greens and regionalists	Germany 7, Belgium 7, France 9, Ireland 2, Italy 2, Luxembourg 1, Netherlands 4, UK 6, Spain 4, Austria 2, Finland 2, Sweden 2	8%	48
EUL/NGL	Left-wing group	Germany 6, Denmark 1, France 11, Italy 6, Netherlands 1, Greece 7, Spain 4, Portugal 2, Finland 1, Sweden 3	7%	42
UEN	National conservatives	Denmark 1, France 13, Ireland 6, Italy 9, Portugal 2	5%	31
NI & TGI	Independents	Belgium 2, France 5, Italy 12, UK 1, Spain 1, Austria 5	4%	26 (18+8)
EDD	Eurosceptics	Denmark 4, France 6, Netherlands 3, UK 3	3%	16
Sources:			100%	626
