= Members of the European Parliament (1994–1999) =

This is a list giving breakdowns of the European Parliamentary session from 1994 to 1999.

- MEPs for Austria 1996–1999
- MEPs for Belgium 1994–1999
- MEPs for Denmark 1994–1999
- MEPs for Finland 1994–1999
- MEPs for France 1994–1999
- MEPs for Greece 1994–1999
- MEPs for Germany 1994–1999
- MEPs for Ireland 1994–1999
- MEPs for Italy 1994–1999
- MEPs for Luxembourg 1994–1999
- List of members of the European Parliament for the Netherlands, 1994–1999
- MEPs for Portugal 1994–1999
- MEPs for Spain 1994–1999
- MEPs for Sweden 1995
  - MEPs for Sweden 1995–1999
- MEPs for the UK 1994–1999
