= Rainbow Group =

Rainbow Group may refer to two political groups of the European Parliament:

- Rainbow Group (1984–1989)
- Rainbow Group (1989–1994)

== See also ==
- Political groups of the European Parliament
