= Christian Union–SGP =

Electoral alliance in the Netherlands

Christian Union – Reformed Political Party ChristenUnie–SGP
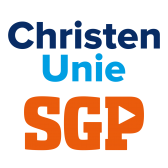
- Abbreviation: CU–SGP
- Provincial councils (Note: North Brabant): 1 / 548
- Municipal Councils (Note: Not counting seats in municipalities where the parties ran on separate lists (Christian Union 305 seats, SGP 229 seats)): 101 / 7,991

Christian Union–SGP (Dutch: ChristenUnie – Staatkundig Gereformeerde Partij) is a collaboration between the Dutch political parties Christian Union (CU) and Reformed Political Party (SGP). In some municipal elections and Provincial Council elections, the parties submit a joint list. Before the merger of the Reformed Political Alliance (GPV) and the Reformatory Political Federation (RPF) into Christian Union in 2000, these parties also participated in various combinations, including SGP/RPF/GPV. From 1984 to 2019, the parties (or the predecessors of Christian Union) participated jointly in the European Parliament elections.

== General ==
List combinations in municipal elections (1978–1998).
| Election | SGP/GPV | SGP/RPF | GPV/RPF | SGP/GPV/RPF | Total |
|---|---|---|---|---|---|
| 1978 | 23 | 33 | 5 | 9 | 70 |
| 1982 | 8 | 38 | 34 | 43 | 123 |
| 1986 | 8 | 37 | 26 | 38 | 109 |
| 1990 | 9 | 33 | 35 | 48 | 125 |
| 1994 | 8–9 | 36–37 | 51–52 | 51–52 | 148 |
| 1998 | 3 | 22 | 62–63 | 47–8 | 135 |

The RPF, GPV, and SGP differed in their attitudes towards electoral cooperation. Since its founding in 1975, the RPF aimed for "cooperation with other [...] political groups that, like the RPF, advocate policies based on God's Word." The SGP was traditionally committed to independence but collaborated locally with ARP and CHU in the 1950s until they merged into the CDA. The GPV had long-standing principled objections to list combinations but became increasingly open to them from the 1980s. For the 1984 European Parliament elections, the GPV – after much internal controversy – agreed to a list combination for the first time.

In the following years, the GPV began to take a more flexible stance towards cooperation. In 1994, objections arose from the SGP after the RPF proposed a female candidate for the joint list for the European Parliament elections. Ultimately, the candidate withdrew, allowing for joint participation. The SGP board then declared that participation in a joint list with a woman remained unacceptable in principle. Only if a joint seat could yield an extra seat or a better position in the composition of the executive board were negotiations possible, but women were still not allowed in an electable position. The RPF and GPV responded by setting rules ensuring they would not be forced to exclude women from joint lists.

Number of municipalities with cooperation between Christian Union and SGP during regular elections.
| Election | Municipalities | Percentage |
|---|---|---|
| 2006 | 41 | 9.8 |
| 2010 | 38 | 9.7 |
| 2014 | 38 | 10 |
| 2018 | 39 | 11.6 |
| 2022 | 34 | 10.2 |

== European Parliament ==
In the first European Parliament elections in 1979, the SGP and GPV participated independently. Both parties did not win a seat. Starting in 1984, the parties, together with the RPF, formed a joint list, which did win a seat.

After the first two successful elections, Leen van der Waal was not part of a faction (Non-Inscrits). In 1994, Van der Waal joined the faction Europe of Nations and in 1996 its successor, Independents for a Europe of Nations. Hans Blokland and Van der Waal joined Europe of Democracies and Diversities (EDD) in 1999 when the previous faction reorganized.

In 2004, GPV and RPF merged to form the Christian Union. That year, EDD reorganized again into the Independence/Democracy (IND/DEM).

In 2009, the MEPs from the shared list split into two different factions. Peter van Dalen (CU) joined the European Conservatives and Reformists (ECR). The SGP, due to its stance on women, was not allowed in the ECR. Bas Belder therefore joined the successor of IND/DEM, Europe of Freedom and Democracy (EFD). In 2014, the SGP softened its stance on female candidacy, and the party was subsequently admitted into the ECR.

In 2019, however, there was another split when Christian Union left the ECR for the European People's Party Group, because radical-right parties like Forum for Democracy (FvD) had joined the ECR. Due to growing disagreements, Christian Union decided in 2022 not to form a joint list in the European Parliament elections on 6 June 2024. SGP managed to get enough votes for a seat, while Christian Union fell just below the threshold.

== House of Representatives ==
In 1973, electoral alliances became possible, and in 1977 the parties formed an electoral alliance at the initiative of the RPF, despite the GPV wanting to ally only with the SGP and not with the RPF. Due to poor results, the GPV chose not to participate in an electoral alliance with the RPF in 1981, leading to an alliance only between the SGP and the RPF. This was so successful for the RPF that the GPV decided to participate again the following year. Since then, there was always an electoral alliance between the three parties (or two parties, after the RPF and GPV merged into the Christian Union) until the abolition of electoral alliances after the 2017 general election.

== Election results ==
| Election | List | Votes | % | Seats | +/– | Ref. |
|---|---|---|---|---|---|---|
| 1984 | List | 275,786 | 5.21 | 1 / 25 | 1 ▲ | |
| 1989 | List | 309,060 | 5.90 | 1 / 25 | 0 | |
| 1994 | List | 322,793 | 7.81 | 2 / 31 | 1 ▲ | |
| 1999 | List | 309,612 | 8.74 | 3 / 31 | 1 ▲ | |
| 2004 | List | 279,880 | 5.87 | 2 / 27 | 1 ▼ | |
| 2009 | List | 310,540 | 6.82 | 2 / 25 | 0 | |
| 2014 | List | 364,843 | 7.67 | 2 / 26 | 0 | |
| 2019 | List | 375,660 | 6.83 | 2 / 26 | 0 | |
