= Political groups of the European Parliament =

Groups of aligned legislators in European Parliament

The political groups of the European Parliament are the officially recognised parliamentary groups consisting of legislators of aligned ideologies in the European Parliament. Majorities in the Parliament depend on how each group vote and what deals are negotiated among them. The European Parliament is unique among supranational assemblies in that its members (MEPs) organise themselves into ideological groups, rather than national cleavages.

Each political group is assumed to have a set of core principles, and political groups that cannot demonstrate this may be disbanded. A political group of the European Parliament usually constitutes the formal parliamentary representation of one or two of the European political parties (Europarty), sometimes supplemented by members from other national political parties or independent politicians. In contrast to the European political parties, it is strictly forbidden for political groups to organise or finance the political campaign during the European elections since this is the exclusive responsibility of the parties.

There are other incentives for MEPs to organise in parliamentary groups: besides the political advantages of working together with like-minded colleagues, groups have some procedural privileges within Parliament (such as group spokespersons speaking first in debates, group leaders representing the group in the Parliament's Conference of Presidents), and groups receive a staff allocation and financial subsidies.

== Status ==
Although most of the political groups in the European Parliament correlate to a corresponding political party, there are cases where members from two political parties come together in a shared political group. For example, the European Free Alliance (half a dozen MEPs in the ninth Parliament) and the European Green Party (over 50 MEPs in the ninth Parliament) have, since 1999, felt they are stronger by working together in the European Greens–European Free Alliance group than they would have as stand-alone groups (especially for the EFA, which would not otherwise have enough members to constitute a group). The same is true of the Renew Europe group, most of whose members are from the Alliance of Liberals and Democrats for Europe Party, but also includes a dozen from the small European Democratic Party. Both have also had independents and MEPs from minor parties also join their group. For a group to be formally recognised in Parliament, it must fulfil the conditions laid down in the relevant European Parliament Rule of Procedure.

This lays down the minimum criteria a group must meet to qualify as a group. The numerical criteria are 23 MEPs (at 3.3 percent, a lower threshold than in most national parliaments), but they must come from at least one-quarter of Member States (so currently at least seven). They must also share a political affinity and submit a political declaration, setting out the purpose of the group, the values that it stands for and the main political objectives which its members intend to pursue together. While 23 MEPs from one-quarter of Member States would also be sufficient to register a European political party, forming a European party is not a requirement to form a group, as long as the criteria of political affinity is met. The requirement of political affinity was put to the test in July 1999, when a varied group of non-attached members, ranging from the liberal Bonino List in Italy to the French National Front, tried to create a new technical group, but Parliament decided that the new group did not, by its own admission, meet the requirement for political affinity. This decision was challenged at the CJEU, which found in Parliament's favour. Further questions were asked when MEPs attempted to create a far-right group called Identity, Tradition, Sovereignty (ITS). This generated controversy and there were concerns about public funds going towards a far-right group.

Attempts to block the formation of ITS were unsuccessful, but ITS were blocked from leading positions on committees, when members from other groups declined to vote for their candidates, despite a previous tradition of sharing such posts among members from all groups. These events spurred MEPs, mainly from the largest two groups, to approve a rise in the threshold for groups to its current levels, having previously been even lower. This was opposed by many MEPs, notably from smaller Groups but also from the Liberal Group, arguing that it would be detrimental to democracy, whilst supporters argued that the change made it harder for a small number of members, possibly on the extremes (including the far right), to claim public funds.

== Internal structure ==
Groups are often based around a single European political party (e.g. the European People's Party or the Party of European Socialists), joined by other national parties and independent MEPs. Other groups include more than one European party, such as the Greens–European Free Alliance group. While there is no group not centred on at least one European party, the presence of a European party is not a requirement. Each group appoints a leader, referred to as a "president", "coordinator", or "chair". The chairs of each group meet in the Conference of Presidents to decide what issues would be dealt with at the plenary session of the European Parliament. Groups can table motions for resolutions and table amendments to reports.

== Spectrum ==
=== Composition of the 10th European Parliament ===
| Political group | European political parties | MEPs |
|---|---|---|
| European People's Party Group (EPP Group) | European People's Party (EPP); European Christian Political Party (ECPP) | 184 / 720 (26%) |
| Progressive Alliance of Socialists and Democrats (S&D) | Party of European Socialists (PES) | 135 / 720 (19%) |
| Patriots for Europe (PfE) | Patriots.eu | 85 / 720 (12%) |
| European Conservatives and Reformists Group (ECR Group) | European Conservatives and Reformists Party (ECR); European Free Alliance (EFA); European Christian Political Party (ECPP) | 84 / 720 (12%) |
| Renew Europe (Renew) | Alliance of Liberals and Democrats for Europe Party (ALDE Party); European Democratic Party (EDP) | 78 / 720 (11%) |
| Greens/European Free Alliance (Greens/EFA) | European Green Party (EGP); European Free Alliance (EFA) | 53 / 720 (7%) |
| The Left in the European Parliament (The Left) | European Left Alliance for the People and the Planet (ELA); Party of the European Left (PEL) | 45 / 720 (6%) |
| Europe of Sovereign Nations Group (ESN) | Europe of Sovereign Nations (ESN) | 27 / 720 (4%) |
| Non-attached members (Non-Inscrits) | | 28 / 720 (4%) |
| Vacant | | 1 / 720 |

=== Positions ===
Ideological spectrum of the European Parliament
| Group | Ideology | Left–right spectrum | European integration |
|---|---|---|---|
| The Left in the European Parliament (The Left) | Democratic socialism | Left-wing | Soft Eurosceptic |
| Greens–European Free Alliance (Greens/EFA) | Green politics | Centre-left to left-wing | Pro-European |
| Progressive Alliance of Socialists and Democrats (S&D) | Social democracy | Centre-left | Pro-European |
| Renew Europe (Renew) | Liberalism | Centre to centre-right | Pro-European |
| European People's Party Group (EPP) | Christian democracy, conservatism | Centre-right | Pro-European |
| European Conservatives and Reformists Group (ECR) | National conservatism, Atlanticism, right-wing populism | Right-wing to far-right | Soft Eurosceptic |
| Patriots for Europe (PfE) | National conservatism, right-wing populism | Right-wing to far-right | Eurosceptic |
| Europe of Sovereign Nations Group (ESN) | Ultranationalism, ultraconservatism, right-wing populism, neo-fascism | Far-right | Hard Eurosceptic |

== Analyses ==
National media focus on the MEPs and national parties of their own member state, neglecting the group's activities and poorly understanding their structure or even existence. Transnational media coverage of the groups per se is limited to those organs such as the Parliament itself, or those news media (e.g. EUObserver or theParliament.com) that specialise in the Parliament. These organs cover the groups in detail but with little overarching analysis. So although such organs make it easy to find out how a group acted on a specific vote, they provide little information on the voting patterns of a specific group. As a result, the only bodies providing analysis of the voting patterns and Weltanschauung of the groups are academics. Academics analysing the European political groups include Simon Hix (London School of Economics and Political Science), Amie Kreppel University of Florida, Abdul Noury (Free University of Brussels), Gérard Roland, (University of California, Berkeley), Gail McElroy (Trinity College Dublin, Department of Political Science), Kenneth Benoit (Trinity College Dublin – Institute for International Integration Studies, IIIS), Friedrich Heinemann, Philipp Mohl, and Steffen Osterloh (University of Mannheim – Centre for European Economic Research).

=== Groups cohesion ===
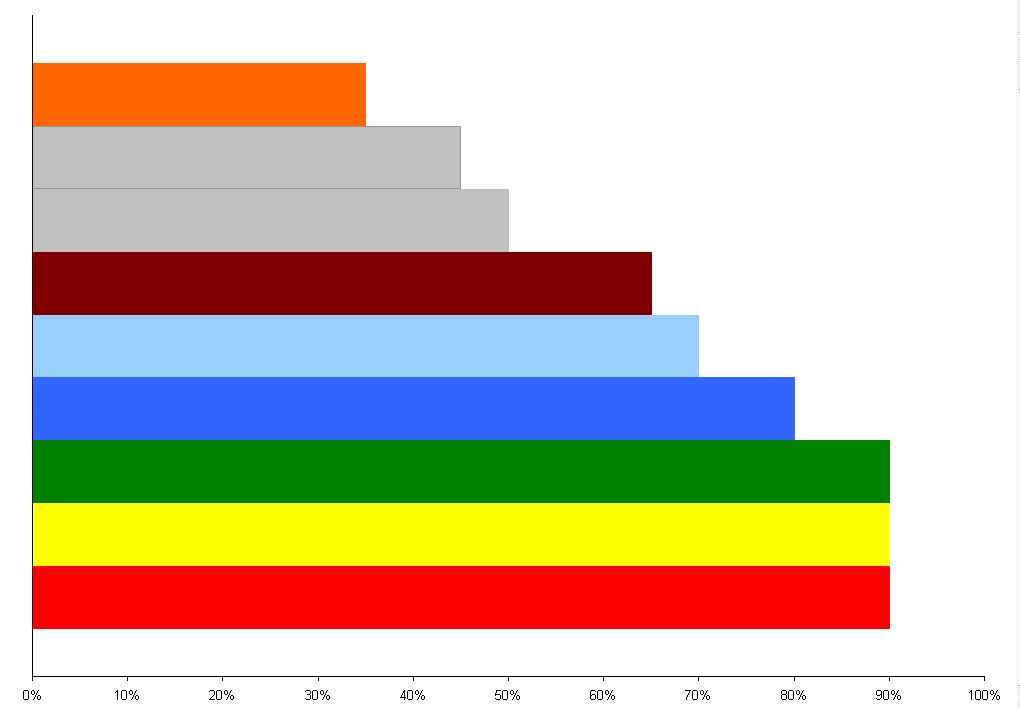
2002 Group cohesion (see description for sources)

Cohesion is the term used to define whether a group is united or divided amongst itself. Figure 1 of a 2002 paper from European Integration online Papers (EIoP) by Thorsten Faas analysed the groups as they stood in 2002. The results for each group are given in the adjacent diagram with the horizontal scale scaled so that 0% = totally split, 100% = totally united.

Group cohesion (2002)
| Group | Cohesion | Source |
|---|---|---|
| PES | approx 90% | |
| ELDR | approx 90% | |
| G/EFA | approx 90% | |
| EPP-ED | approx 80% | |
| UEN | approx 70% | |
| EUL/NGL | approx 65% | |
| TGI | approx 50% | |
| NI | approx 45% | |
| EDD | approx 35% | |

G/EFA, PES, and ELDR were the most united groups, with EDD the most disunited.

=== Proportion of female MEPs ===
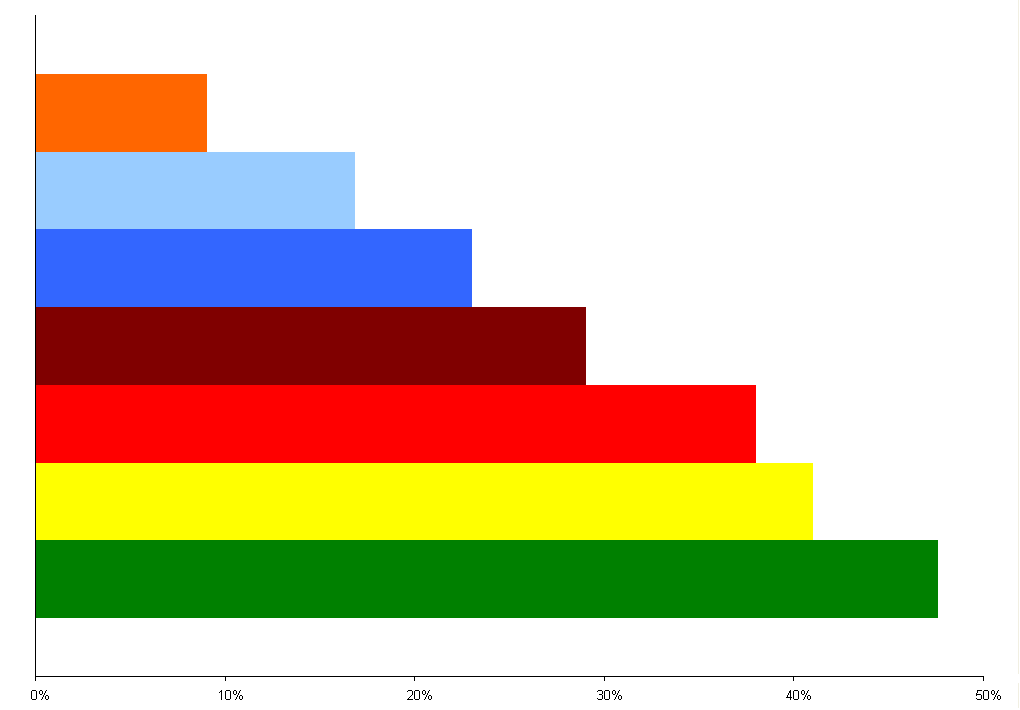
2006 Group gender balance (see description for sources)

The March 2006 edition of Social Europe: the Journal of the European Left included a chapter called "Women and Social Democratic Politics" by Wendy Stokes. That chapter gave the proportion of female MEPs in each Group in the European Parliament. The results for each Group are given in the adjacent diagram. The horizontal scale denotes gender balance (0% = totally male, 100% = totally female, but no Group has a female majority, so the scale stops at 50%).

Group percentage female (2006)
| Group | Percentage female | Source |
|---|---|---|
| G/EFA | 47.6% | |
| ALDE | 41% | |
| PES | 38% | |
| EUL/NGL | 29% | |
| EPP-ED | 23% | |
| UEN | 16.8% | |
| IND/DEM | 9% | |

G/EFA, PES, and ALDE were the most balanced groups in terms of gender, with IND/DEM being the most unbalanced.

=== Party relations ===
The European Parliament does not form a government in the traditional sense and its politics have developed over consensual rather than adversarial lines as a form of consociationalism. No single group has ever held a majority in Parliament. Historically, the two largest parliamentary formations have been the EPP Group and the PES Group, which are affiliated to their respective European political parties, the European People's Party (EPP) and the Party of European Socialists (PES). These two groups have dominated the Parliament for much of its life, continuously holding between 50 and 70 percent of the seats together. The PES were the largest single party grouping up to 1999, when they were overtaken by the centre-right EPP.

In 1987, the Single European Act came into force and under the new cooperation procedure the European Parliament needed to obtain large majorities to make the most impact. So the EPP and PES came to an agreement to cooperate in the Parliament. This agreement became known as the grand coalition. Aside from a break in the fifth Parliament, it has dominated the Parliament for much of its life, regardless of necessity. The grand coalition is visible in the agreement between the two groups to divide the five-year term of the President of the European Parliament equally between them, with an EPP president for half the term and a PES president for the other half, regardless of the actual election result.

==== Group cooperation ====
Table 3 of 21 August 2008 version of working paper by Hix and Noury gave figures for the level of cooperation between each group (how many times they vote with a group, and how many times they vote against) for the Fifth and Sixth Parliaments, where 0% = never votes with, 100% = always votes with.

Group cooperation (Sixth Parliament)
| Group | Number of times voted with (%) | | | | | | | | Sources |
|---|---|---|---|---|---|---|---|---|---|
| Group | EUL/NGL | G/EFA | PES | ALDE | EPP-ED | UEN | IND/DEM | NI | Sources |
| EUL/NGL | n/a | 75.4 | 62.0 | 48.0 | 39.6 | 42.2 | 45.5 | 48.6 | |
| G/EFA | 75.4 | n/a | 70.3 | 59.2 | 47.4 | 45.1 | 40.3 | 43.0 | |
| PES | 62.0 | 70.3 | n/a | 75.3 | 68.4 | 62.8 | 42.9 | 52.3 | |
| ALDE | 48.0 | 59.2 | 75.3 | n/a | 78.0 | 72.4 | 48.0 | 53.7 | |
| EPP-ED | 39.6 | 47.4 | 68.4 | 78.0 | n/a | 84.3 | 54.0 | 64.1 | |
| UEN | 42.2 | 45.1 | 62.8 | 72.4 | 84.3 | n/a | 56.8 | 64.7 | |
| IND/DEM | 45.5 | 40.3 | 42.9 | 48.0 | 54.0 | 56.8 | n/a | 68.1 | |
| NI | 48.6 | 43.0 | 52.3 | 53.7 | 64.1 | 64.7 | 68.1 | n/a | |

Group cooperation (Fifth Parliament)
| Group | Number of times voted with (%) | | | | | | | | Sources |
|---|---|---|---|---|---|---|---|---|---|
| Group | EUL/NGL | G/EFA | PES | ELDR | EPP-ED | UEN | EDD | NI | Sources |
| EUL/NGL | n/a | 79.3 | 69.1 | 55.4 | 42.4 | 45.9 | 59.2 | 52.4 | |
| G/EFA | 79.3 | n/a | 72.0 | 62.3 | 47.1 | 45.2 | 55.5 | 51.0 | |
| PES | 69.1 | 72.0 | n/a | 72.9 | 64.5 | 52.6 | 52.6 | 56.8 | |
| ELDR | 55.4 | 62.3 | 72.9 | n/a | 67.9 | 55.0 | 52.3 | 60.0 | |
| EPP-ED | 42.4 | 47.1 | 64.5 | 67.9 | n/a | 71.2 | 52.0 | 68.2 | |
| UEN | 45.9 | 45.2 | 52.6 | 55.0 | 71.2 | n/a | 62.6 | 73.8 | |
| EDD | 59.2 | 55.5 | 52.6 | 52.3 | 52.0 | 62.6 | n/a | 63.8 | |
| NI | 52.4 | 51.0 | 56.8 | 60.0 | 68.2 | 73.8 | 63.8 | n/a | |

EUL/NGL and G/EFA voted closely together, as did PES and ALDE, and EPP-ED and UEN. Surprisingly, given that PES and EPP-ED are partners in the grand coalition, they were not each other's closest allies, although they voted with each other about two-thirds of the time. IND/DEM did not have close allies within the political groups, preferring instead to cooperate most closely with the Non-Inscrits.

==== Breaking coalitions ====
During the fifth term the ELDR Group were involved in a break in the grand coalition when they entered into an alliance with the European People's Party, to the exclusion of the Party of European Socialists. This was reflected in the Presidency of the Parliament with the terms being shared between the EPP and the ELDR, rather than the EPP and PES as before.

ELDR intervention was not the only cause for a break in the grand coalition. There have been specific occasions where real left-right party politics have emerged, notably the resignation of the Santer Commission. When the initial allegations against the Commission Budget emerged, they were directed primarily against the PES Édith Cresson and Manuel Marín. PES supported the commission and saw the issue as an attempt by the EPP to discredit their party ahead of the 1999 elections. EPP disagreed. Whilst the Parliament was considering rejecting the community budget, President Jacques Santer argued that a "No" vote would be tantamount to a vote of no confidence. PES leader Pauline Green MEP attempted a vote of confidence and the EPP put forward countermotions. During this period the two Groups adopted a government-opposition dynamic, with PES supporting the executive and EPP renouncing its previous coalition support and voting it down.

In 2004, there was another notable break in the grand coalition. It occurred over the nomination of Rocco Buttiglione as European Commissioner for Justice, Freedom and Security. The EPP supported the appointment of Buttiglione, while the PES, who were also critics of the President-designate Jose Manuel Barroso, led the parties seeking Buttiglione's removal following his rejection (the first in EU history) by a Parliamentary committee. Barroso initially stood by his team and offered only small concessions, which were rejected by the PES. The EPP demanded that if Buttiglione were to go, then a PES commissioner must also be sacrificed for balance. In the end, Italy withdrew Buttiglione and put forward Franco Frattini instead. Frattini won the support of the PES and the Barroso Commission was finally approved, albeit behind schedule. Politicisation such as the above has been increasing, with Simon Hix of the London School of Economics noting in 2007:

Our work also shows that politics in the European Parliament is becoming increasingly based around party and ideology. Voting is increasingly split along left-right lines, and the cohesion of the party groups has risen dramatically, particularly in the fourth and fifth parliaments. So there are likely to be policy implications here too.

The dynamical coalitions in the European Parliament show year-to-year changes.

==== Group switching ====
Party group switching in the European Parliament is the phenomenon where parliamentarians individually or collectively switch from one party group to the other. The phenomenon of EP party group switching is a well-known contributor to the volatility of the EP party system and highlights the fluidity that characterizes the composition of European political groups. On average, 9% of MEPs switch during legislative terms. Party group switching is a phenomenon that gained force especially in the legislatures during the 1990s, up to a maximum of 18% for the 1989–1994 term, with strong prevalence among representatives from France and Italy, though by no means limited to those two countries. There is a clear tendency of party group switches from the ideological extremes, both left and right, toward the center. Most switching takes place at the outset of legislative terms, with another peak around the half-term moment, when responsibilities rotate within the EP hierarchy.

== History ==
The composition of the European Parliament with regard to percentage share of deputies for each political group, 1979 to 2024. Left to right:

Left-wing
Social democrats
Greens and regionalists
Liberals and centrists
Christian democrats and conservatives
Eurosceptics
Eurosceptic conservatives
Right-wing nationalists
Heterogeneous
Non-inscrits

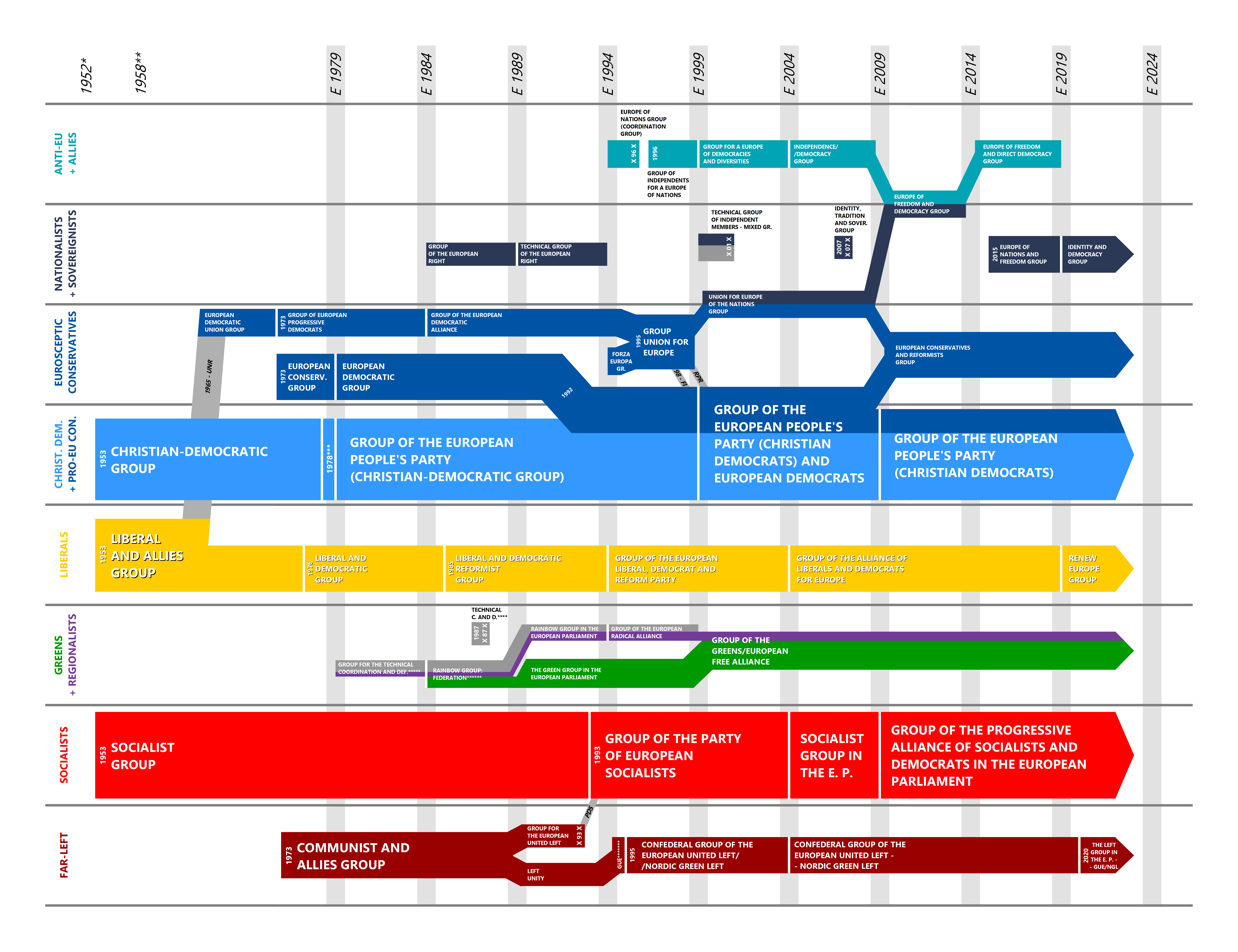
Development of political groups in the European Parliament

The political groups of the European Parliament have been around in one form or another since September 1952 and the first meeting of the Parliament's predecessor, the Common Assembly. The groups are coalitions of MEPs and the European parties and national parties that those MEPs belong to. The groups have coalesced into representations of the dominant schools of European political thought and are the primary actors in Parliament. The first three groups were established in the earliest days of the Parliament. They were the Socialist Group (which eventually became the S&D Group), the Christian Democrat Group (later EPP Group), and the Liberals and Allies Group (later Renew Europe). As the Parliament developed, other groups emerged. Gaullists from France founded the European Democratic Union group. When Conservatives from Denmark and the United Kingdom joined, they created the European Conservatives group, which (after some name changes) eventually merged with the group of the EPP. The 1979 first direct election established further groups and strengthened the role of their corresponding European political parties such as the European People's Party.

Since even before the first elections, the five political groups on the left, centre, and moderate right have had continuous existence for over 50 years (or 1989 in the case of the Greens). By contrast, on the right and far-right of the political spectrum (i.e. to the right of the EPP), there has been an unstable and frequently changing situation. Some 18 groups have been created to the right of the EPP, some very short-lived. Even when a group has existed for several years, its composition has often varied as their member parties or individual MEPs leave to join another group. The trajectories of some national parties has been striking. Lega from Italy has been in no fewer than 8 political groups (plus 4 years when they were "non-attached" and not in any group). Alternative for Germany (AfD), which joined Parliament since 2014, has already been in 4 different groups. The Finns Party has also been in 4, while the Law and Justice (PiS) party from Poland in 2 and the National Fronte (FN) from France in 5 and a long spell as "non-attached". This instability "reflects major differences on many key issues and on strategy".

=== Compositions of past European Parliaments ===
==== Fifth European Parliament ====
Group positions (end of Fifth Parliament, 2004)
| Group | Issue on which position was analysed | | | | | | | | |
| Group | Left-Right | Tax | Deeper Europe | Federal Europe | Deregulation | Common Foreign and Security Policy | Fortress Europe (immigration) | Green issues | Homosexual equality, abortion, euthanasia |
|---|---|---|---|---|---|---|---|---|---|
| EUL/NGL | 18.0% | 75.5% | 52.5% | 46.0% | 20.0% | 39.0% | 30.5% | 65.5% | 78.5% |
| G/EFA | 25.5% | 71.5% | 63.5% | 58.0% | 33.5% | 44.0% | 32.5% | 85.5% | 80.0% |
| PES | 37.0% | 68.0% | 68.5% | 69.5% | 37.0% | 71.5% | 36.5% | 57.0% | 72.0% |
| Renew | 59.0% | 34.5% | 62.5% | 68.5% | 71.0% | 68.5% | 37.0% | 45.5% | 78.0% |
| EPP-ED | 63.0% | 33.0% | 63.0% | 63.0% | 67.5% | 70.0% | 60.0% | 39.5% | 30.5% |
| UEN | 82.5% | 30.5% | 11.5% | 17.0% | 65.0% | 16.0% | 87.5% | 36.0% | 24.5% |
| EDD | 85.5% | 29.5% | 5.5% | 5.5% | 73.0% | 7.5% | 87.5% | 35.5% | 24.5% |
| Source | | | | | | | | | |

==== Sixth European Parliament ====
The mandate of the previous European Parliament ran from 2004 and 2009. It was composed of the following political groups.

| Group | Parties | Leader(s) | Est. | MEPs |
|---|---|---|---|---|
| European People's Party–European Democrats (EPP–ED) | European People's Party (EPP); European Democrats (ED) | Joseph Daul | 1999 | 288 |
| Party of European Socialists (PES) | Party of European Socialists (PES) | Martin Schulz | 1953 | 217 |
| Alliance of Liberals and Democrats for Europe (ALDE) | European Liberal Democrat and Reform Party (ELDR); European Democratic Party (EDP) + 2 unaffiliated national parties + 2 independent politicians | Graham Watson | 2004 | 104 |
| Union for Europe of the Nations (UEN) | Alliance for Europe of the Nations (AEN) + 6 unaffiliated national parties | Cristiana Muscardini | 1994 | 40 |
| The Greens–European Free Alliance (Greens–EFA) | European Green Party (EGP); European Free Alliance (EFA) + 2 unaffiliated national parties | Monica Frassoni; Daniel Cohn-Bendit | 1999 | 43 |
| European United Left–Nordic Green Left (GUE–NGL) | Party of the European Left (PEL); Nordic Green Left Alliance (NGLA) + 5 unaffiliated national parties | Francis Wurtz | 1994 | 41 |
| Independence/Democracy (IND/DEM) | Alliance of Independent Democrats in Europe (AIDE); EUDemocrats (EUD) + 2 unaffiliated national parties | Nigel Farage; Kathy Sinnott | 2004 | 22 |
| Non-Inscrits (NI) | Euronat + 11 unaffiliated national parties + 3 independent politicians | N/A | | 30 |
| Source for MEPs: European Parliament | | Total | | 785 |

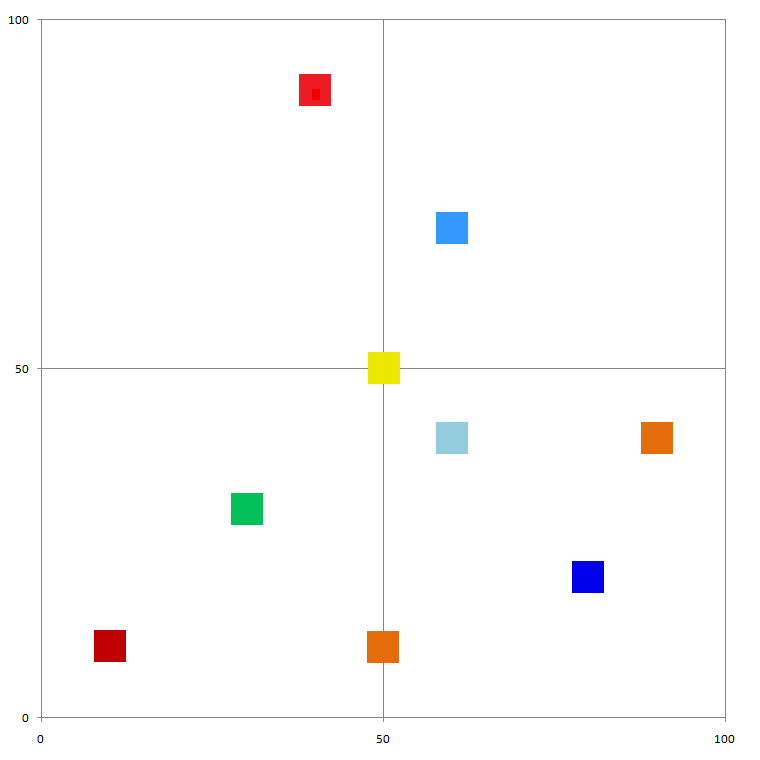
Hix-Lord model for first half of the Sixth Parliament (see description for sources)

Table 3 of the 3 January 2008 version of a working paper from the London School of Economics/Free University of Brussels by Hix and Noury considered the positions of the groups in the Sixth Parliament (2004–2009) by analysing their roll-call votes. The results for each group are shown in the adjacent diagram. The vertical scale is the anti-pro Europe spectrum, (0% = extremely anti-Europe, 100% = extremely pro), and the horizontal scale is the economic left-right spectrum, (0% = extremely economically left-wing, 100% = extremely economically right-wing).

Group positions (Sixth Parliament)
| Group | Left-right spectrum | Eurosceptic spectrum | Sources |
|---|---|---|---|
| EUL/NGL | very left-wing | Eurosceptic | |
| PES | centre-left | very Europhile | |
| G/EFA | left-wing | Europhile | |
| Renew | centre | Europhile | |
| EPP-ED (EPP subgroup) | centre-right | Europhile | |
| EPP-ED (ED subgroup) | right-wing | Eurosceptic | |
| IND/DEM (reformist subgroup) | centre | very Eurosceptic | |
| IND/DEM (secessionist subgroup) | very right-wing | Secessionist | |
| UEN | centre-right | Eurosceptic | |

Two of the groups (EPP-ED and IND/DEM) were split. EPP-ED are split on Euroscepticism: the EPP subgroup ( ) were centre-right Europhiles, whereas the ED subgroup ( ) were right-wing Eurosceptics. IND/DEM was also split along its subgroups: the reformist subgroup ( , bottom-center) voted as centrist Eurosceptics, and the secessionist subgroup ( , middle-right) voted as right-wing Euroneutrals. The reformist subgroup was able to pursue a reformist agenda via the Parliament. The secessionist subgroup was unable to pursue a secessionist agenda there (it is out of the Parliament's purview) and pursued a right-wing agenda instead. This resulted in the secessionist subgroup being less Eurosceptic in terms of roll-call votes than other, non-eurosceptic parties. UKIP (the major component of the secessionist subgroup) was criticised for this seeming abandonment of its Eurosceptic core principles.

Table 2 of a 2005 discussion paper from the Institute for International Integration Studies by Gail McElroy and Kenneth Benoit analysed the group positions between April and June 2004, at the end of the Fifth Parliament and immediately before the 2004 elections. The results are given below, with 0% = extremely against, 100% = extremely for (except for the left-right spectrum, where 0% = extremely left-wing, 100% = extremely right-wing).

==== Seventh European Parliament ====
| Group | Parties | Leader(s) | Est. | MEPs |
|---|---|---|---|---|
| European People's Party (EPP) | European People's Party (EPP) +1 unaffiliated national party | Joseph Daul | 2009 | 274 |
| Progressive Alliance of Socialists and Democrats (S&D) | Party of European Socialists (PES) +3 unaffiliated national parties | Hannes Swoboda | 2009 | 195 |
| Alliance of Liberals and Democrats for Europe (ALDE) | Alliance of Liberals and Democrats for Europe (ALDE); European Democratic Party (EDP) + 3 independent politicians | Guy Verhofstadt | 2004 | 85 |
| The Greens–European Free Alliance (Greens–EFA) | European Green Party (EGP); European Free Alliance (EFA) + 2 unaffiliated national parties + 2 independent politicians | Daniel Cohn-Bendit; Rebecca Harms | 1999 | 58 |
| European Conservatives and Reformists Group (ECR) | Alliance of European Conservatives and Reformists (AECR); European Christian Political Movement (ECPM) + 1 unaffiliated national party + 2 independent politicians | Martin Callanan | 2009 | 56 |
| European United Left–Nordic Green Left (GUE-NGL) | Party of the European Left (PEL); Nordic Green Left Alliance (NGLA) + 10 unaffiliated national parties | Gabi Zimmer | 2009 | 35 |
| Europe of Freedom and Democracy (EFD) | Movement for a Europe of Liberties and Democracy (MELD) + 2 unaffiliated national parties + 2 independent politicians | Nigel Farage; Francesco Speroni | 2009 | 33 |
| Non-Inscrits (NI) | Alliance of European National Movements (AENM) +14 unaffiliated national parties + 3 independent politicians | N/A | | 30 |
| Source for MEPs: European Parliament | | Total | | 766 |

==== Eighth European Parliament ====
Major changes compared to the period 2004–2009 were:

- The formation of a new political group, the European Conservatives and Reformists (ECR). This conservative, Eurosceptic group was headed by 26 MEPs from the UK's Conservative Party.
- The Eurosceptic Independence/Democracy (IND/DEM) and Union for Europe of the Nations (UEN) groups suffered heavy losses in the election. On their own, they no longer had enough MEPs to form a separate group. MEPs formerly from these groups formed the Europe of Freedom and Democracy (EFD) group on 1 July 2009.
- The centre-right European People's Party now formed its own political group in its entirety, as the former members of the European Democrats left the group to join the ECR.
- The political group of the Party of European Socialists renamed itself to the Progressive Alliance of Socialists and Democrats or Socialists and Democrats (S&D) to accommodate the Democratic Party of Italy. The Democratic Party did not become member of the Party of European Socialists until February 2014.

| Group | Parties | Leader(s) | Est. | MEPs |
|---|---|---|---|---|
| European People's Party (EPP) | European People's Party (EPP); +1 unaffiliated national party; +4 independent politicians | Manfred Weber | 2009 | 216 |
| Progressive Alliance of Socialists and Democrats (S&D) | Party of European Socialists (PES); +3 unaffiliated national parties | Gianni Pittella | 2009 | 185 |
| European Conservatives and Reformists Group (ECR) | Alliance of Conservatives and Reformists in Europe (ACRE); European Christian Political Movement (ECPM); + 1 unaffiliated national party; + 2 independent politicians | Syed Kamall | 2009 | 77 |
| Alliance of Liberals and Democrats for Europe (ALDE) | Alliance of Liberals and Democrats for Europe (ALDE); European Democratic Party (EDP); + 5 unaffiliated national parties | Guy Verhofstadt | 2004 | 69 |
| European United Left–Nordic Green Left (GUE-NGL) | Party of the European Left (PEL); European Anti-Capitalist Left (EACL); Nordic Green Left Alliance (NGLA); Maintenant le Peuple (MLP); + 10 unaffiliated national parties | Gabi Zimmer | 1995 | 52 |
| Greens–European Free Alliance (Greens–EFA) | European Green Party (EGP); European Free Alliance (EFA); + 3 unaffiliated national parties; + 2 independent politicians | Rebecca Harms; Philippe Lamberts | 1999 | 52 |
| Europe of Freedom and Direct Democracy (EFDD) | Alliance for Direct Democracy in Europe (ADDE); + 1 unaffiliated national party; + 1 independent politician | Nigel Farage | 2014 | 42 |
| Europe of Nations and Freedom (ENF) | European Alliance for Freedom (EAF); Movement for a Europe of Nations and Freedom (MENF); + 2 unaffiliated national parties; + 2 independent politicians | Marine Le Pen; Marcel de Graaff | 2015 | 36 |
| Non-Inscrits (NI) | Alliance for Peace and Freedom (APF); Alliance of European National Movements (AENM); Initiative of Communist and Workers' Parties (INITIATIVE); +3 unaffiliated national parties; +4 independent politicians | N/A | | 20 |
| Source for MEPs: Seats by Member State | | Total | | 749 |

==== Ninth European Parliament ====
| Political group | | Presidents | | Vice Presidents | |
|---|---|---|---|---|---|
| EPP | Group of the European People's Party | Manfred Weber | GER | Dubravka Šuica until 30 November 2019 | CRO |
| EPP | Group of the European People's Party | Manfred Weber | GER | Željana Zovko from 13 October 2021 | CRO |
| EPP | Group of the European People's Party | Manfred Weber | GER | Esteban González Pons | ESP |
| EPP | Group of the European People's Party | Manfred Weber | GER | Ewa Kopacz until 16 September 2019 | POL |
| EPP | Group of the European People's Party | Manfred Weber | GER | Jan Olbrycht from 16 September 2019 | POL |
| EPP | Group of the European People's Party | Manfred Weber | GER | Siegfried Mureșan | ROU |
| EPP | Group of the European People's Party | Manfred Weber | GER | Mairead McGuinness until 12 October 2020 | IRL |
| EPP | Group of the European People's Party | Manfred Weber | GER | Frances Fitzgerald from 24 March 2021 | IRL |
| EPP | Group of the European People's Party | Manfred Weber | GER | Esther de Lange | NED |
| EPP | Group of the European People's Party | Manfred Weber | GER | Arnaud Danjean | FRA |
| EPP | Group of the European People's Party | Manfred Weber | GER | Andrey Kovatchev until 13 October 2021 | BUL |
| EPP | Group of the European People's Party | Manfred Weber | GER | Vangelis Meimarakis | GRE |
| EPP | Group of the European People's Party | Manfred Weber | GER | Paulo Rangel | POR |
| EPP | Group of the European People's Party | Manfred Weber | GER | Sandra Kalniete from 17 September 2019 until 13 October 2021 | LAT |
| EPP | Group of the European People's Party | Manfred Weber | GER | Rasa Juknevičienė from 13 October 2021 | LIT |
| S&D | Group of the Progressive Alliance of Socialists and Democrats in the European Parliament | Iratxe García | ESP | Éric Andrieu until 15 December 2021 | FRA |
| S&D | Group of the Progressive Alliance of Socialists and Democrats in the European Parliament | Iratxe García | ESP | Alex Agius Saliba from 15 December 2021 | MLT |
| S&D | Group of the Progressive Alliance of Socialists and Democrats in the European Parliament | Iratxe García | ESP | Biljana Borzan | CRO |
| S&D | Group of the Progressive Alliance of Socialists and Democrats in the European Parliament | Iratxe García | ESP | Miriam Dalli until 18 October 2020 | MLT |
| S&D | Group of the Progressive Alliance of Socialists and Democrats in the European Parliament | Iratxe García | ESP | Pedro Marques from 8 December 2020 | POR |
| S&D | Group of the Progressive Alliance of Socialists and Democrats in the European Parliament | Iratxe García | ESP | Heléne Fritzon | SWE |
| S&D | Group of the Progressive Alliance of Socialists and Democrats in the European Parliament | Iratxe García | ESP | Kati Piri until 31 March 2021 | NED |
| S&D | Group of the Progressive Alliance of Socialists and Democrats in the European Parliament | Iratxe García | ESP | Mohammed Chahim from 22 April 2021 | NED |
| S&D | Group of the Progressive Alliance of Socialists and Democrats in the European Parliament | Iratxe García | ESP | Rovana Plumb | ROU |
| S&D | Group of the Progressive Alliance of Socialists and Democrats in the European Parliament | Iratxe García | ESP | Bernd Lange until 11 September 2019 | GER |
| S&D | Group of the Progressive Alliance of Socialists and Democrats in the European Parliament | Iratxe García | ESP | Ismail Ertug from 11 September 2019 until 15 December 2021 | GER |
| S&D | Group of the Progressive Alliance of Socialists and Democrats in the European Parliament | Iratxe García | ESP | Gabriele Bischoff from 15 December 2021 | GER |
| S&D | Group of the Progressive Alliance of Socialists and Democrats in the European Parliament | Iratxe García | ESP | Roberto Gualtieri until 5 September 2019 | ITA |
| S&D | Group of the Progressive Alliance of Socialists and Democrats in the European Parliament | Iratxe García | ESP | Simona Bonafé from 11 September 2019 | ITA |
| S&D | Group of the Progressive Alliance of Socialists and Democrats in the European Parliament | Iratxe García | ESP | Claude Moraes until 31 January 2020 | UK |
| S&D | Group of the Progressive Alliance of Socialists and Democrats in the European Parliament | Iratxe García | ESP | Marek Belka from 26 May 2021 | POL |
| RE | Renew Europe Group | Dacian Cioloș until 19 October 2021 | ROU | Malik Azmani | NED |
| RE | Renew Europe Group | Dacian Cioloș until 19 October 2021 | ROU | Katalin Cseh | HUN |
| RE | Renew Europe Group | Dacian Cioloș until 19 October 2021 | ROU | Luis Garicano | ESP |
| RE | Renew Europe Group | Dacian Cioloș until 19 October 2021 | ROU | Morten Løkkegaard | DEN |
| RE | Renew Europe Group | Dacian Cioloș until 19 October 2021 | ROU | Iskra Mihaylova | BUL |
| RE | Renew Europe Group | Dacian Cioloș until 19 October 2021 | ROU | Frédérique Ries | BEL |
| RE | Renew Europe Group | Dacian Cioloș until 19 October 2021 | ROU | Dominique Riquet until 19 October 2021 | FRA |
| RE | Renew Europe Group | Valérie Hayer from 25 January 2024 | FRA | Nicola Danti from 19 October 2021 | ITA |
| RE | Renew Europe Group | Valérie Hayer from 25 January 2024 | FRA | Sylvie Brunet | FRA |
| RE | Renew Europe Group | Valérie Hayer from 25 January 2024 | FRA | Fredrick Federley until 11 December 2020 | SWE |
| RE | Renew Europe Group | Valérie Hayer from 25 January 2024 | FRA | Michal Šimečka from 4 February 2021 until 19 October 2021 | SVK |
| RE | Renew Europe Group | Valérie Hayer from 25 January 2024 | FRA | Dragoș Tudorache from 19 October 2021 | ROU |
| RE | Renew Europe Group | Valérie Hayer from 25 January 2024 | FRA | Martin Horwood until 31 January 2020 | UK |
| RE | Renew Europe Group | Valérie Hayer from 25 January 2024 | FRA | Abir Al-Sahlani from 18 November 2021 | SWE |
| G/EFA | Group of the Greens/European Free Alliance | Ska Keller | GER | Alyn Smith until 12 December 2019 | UK |
| G/EFA | Group of the Greens/European Free Alliance | Ska Keller | GER | Jordi Solé (Note: Acting from 7 January 2020 for Oriol Junqueras who has been prevented from travelling to the European Parliament due to his detention by Spanish authorities following Catalonia's independence referendum) from 8 September 2020 | ESP |
| G/EFA | Group of the Greens/European Free Alliance | Ska Keller | GER | Alice Bah Kuhnke | SWE |
| G/EFA | Group of the Greens/European Free Alliance | Ska Keller | GER | Gwendoline Delbos-Corfield until 14 December 2021 | FRA |
| G/EFA | Group of the Greens/European Free Alliance | Ska Keller | GER | Marie Toussaint from 14 December 2021 | FRA |
| G/EFA | Group of the Greens/European Free Alliance | Philippe Lamberts | BEL | Bas Eickhout | NED |
| G/EFA | Group of the Greens/European Free Alliance | Philippe Lamberts | BEL | Terry Reintke | GER |
| G/EFA | Group of the Greens/European Free Alliance | Philippe Lamberts | BEL | Ernest Urtasun | ESP |
| G/EFA | Group of the Greens/European Free Alliance | Philippe Lamberts | BEL | Molly Scott Cato until 31 January 2020 | UK |
| G/EFA | Group of the Greens/European Free Alliance | Philippe Lamberts | BEL | Kira Peter Hansen from 14 December 2021 | DEN |
| ID | Identity and Democracy Group | Marco Zanni | ITA | Nicolas Bay | FRA |
| ID | Identity and Democracy Group | Marco Zanni | ITA | Jörg Meuthen | GER |
| ECR | European Conservatives and Reformists | Raffaele Fitto | ITA | Roberts Zīle | LAT |
| ECR | European Conservatives and Reformists | Raffaele Fitto | ITA | Assita Kanko | BEL |
| ECR | European Conservatives and Reformists | Raffaele Fitto | ITA | Peter Lundgren | SWE |
| ECR | European Conservatives and Reformists | Raffaele Fitto | ITA | Derk Jan Eppink until 31 March 2021 | NED |
| ECR | European Conservatives and Reformists | Ryszard Legutko | POL | Rob Roos from 20 April 2021 | NED |
| ECR | European Conservatives and Reformists | Ryszard Legutko | POL | Hermann Tertsch | ESP |
| ECR | European Conservatives and Reformists | Ryszard Legutko | POL | Daniel Hannan until 31 January 2020 | UK |
| ECR | European Conservatives and Reformists | Ryszard Legutko | POL | Beata Szydło from 10 March 2020 | POL |
| GUE/NGL | Confederal Group of the European United Left - Nordic Green Left | Manon Aubry | FRA | João Ferreira until 5 July 2021 | POR |
| GUE/NGL | Confederal Group of the European United Left - Nordic Green Left | Manon Aubry | FRA | João Pimenta Lopes from 6 July 2021 | POR |
| GUE/NGL | Confederal Group of the European United Left - Nordic Green Left | Manon Aubry | FRA | Marisa Matias | POR |
| GUE/NGL | Confederal Group of the European United Left - Nordic Green Left | Martin Schirdewan | GER | Sira Rego | ESP |
| GUE/NGL | Confederal Group of the European United Left - Nordic Green Left | Martin Schirdewan | GER | Nikolaj Villumsen | DEN |

=== History according to group ===
Some of the groups (such as the PES and S&D Group) have become homogeneous units coterminous with their European political party, some (such as IND/DEM) have not. They are still coalitions, not parties in their own right, and do not issue manifestos of their own. It may therefore be difficult to discern how the groups intend to vote without first inspecting the party platforms of their constituent parties, and then with limited certainty.

==== Christian democrats and conservatives ====
In European politics, the centre-right is usually occupied by Christian democrats and conservatives. These two ideological strands have had a tangled relationship in the Parliament. The first Christian Democrat Group was founded in 1953, and stayed with that name for a quarter of a century. Meanwhile, outside the Parliament, local Christian-democratic parties were organising and eventually formed the pan-national political party called the European People's Party on 29 April 1976. Since all the Christian-democratic MEPs were members of this European political party, the group's name was changed to indicate this: first to the Christian-Democratic Group (Group of the European People's Party), on 14 March 1978, and then to Group of the European People's Party (Christian Democrats), on 17 July 1979. Meanwhile, on 16 January 1973, the European Conservative Group was formed, including the British and Danish Conservative parties, which had recently joined the EEC. This group was renamed to the European Democratic Group, starting on 17 July 1979. The EPP Group grew during the 1980s, with conservative parties such as New Democracy of Greece and the People's Party of Spain joining the Group. In contrast, the number of MEPs in the European Democratic Group fell over the same period and it eventually merged with the EPP Group on 1 May 1992.

This consolidation of the centre-right continued during the 1990s, with MEPs from the Italian centre-right party Forza Italia being admitted into the EPP Group on 15 June 1998, after spending nearly a year in their own group (starting in 19 July 1994, and ending on 6 July 1995), which was self-referentially called Forza Europa, and nearly three years, starting on 6 July 1995, and ending on 15 June 1998, in the national-conservative group called Union for Europe. As Conservatives were growing, starting on 20 July 1999, the EPP Group was renamed, with the chosen name, Group of the European People's Party (Christian Democrats) and European Democrats (EPP-ED), to identify the Conservative parties within the group. The group remained under that name until after the 2009 European elections, when it reverted to Group of the European People's Party (Christian Democrats) upon the exit of the European Democrats subgroup and the formation of the European Conservatives and Reformists group in June 2009.

| Group name | English abbr. | French abbr. | Formal European Parliament name | From | To |
|---|---|---|---|---|---|
| Christian Democratic Group | CD | DC | Christian Democratic Group | 23 June 1953 | 14 March 1978 |
| Christian Democratic Group | CD | DC | Christian Democratic Group (Group of the European People's Party) | 14 March 1978 | 17 July 1979 |
| European Conservatives | C | N/A | European Conservative Group | 16 January 1973 | 17 July 1979 |
| European Democrats | ED | DE | European Democratic Group | 17 July 1979 | 1 May 1992 |
| European People's Party | EPP | PPE | Group of the European People's Party (Christian Democrats) | 17 July 1979 | 1 May 1999 |
| Forza Europa | FE | N/A | Forza Europa | 19 July 1994 | 6 July 1995 |
| European People's Party–European Democrats | EPP-ED | PPE-DE | Group of the European People's Party (Christian Democrats) and European Democrats | 20 July 1999 | 22 June 2009 |
| European People's Party | EPP | PPE | Group of the European People's Party (Christian Democrats) | 22 June 2009 | present |

==== Social democrats ====
The S&D has MEPs from 25 of the 27 EU states, including 22 with more than one MEP (in red) and three (Ireland, Latvia and Slovenia) with exactly one MEP (pink). Czechia and Slovakia have no S&D MEPs.

In Western Europe, social-democratic parties have been the dominant centre-left force since the dawn of modern European cooperation. The Socialist Group was one of the first Groups to be founded when it was created on 23 June 1953 in the European Parliament's predecessor, the Common Assembly of the European Coal and Steel Community, and continued through the creation of the appointed Parliament in 1958 and the elected Parliament in 1979. Meanwhile, the national parties making up the group were also organising themselves on a European level outside the Parliament, with the parties creating the Confederation of Socialist Parties of the European Community in 1974, and its successor, the Party of European Socialists, in 1992.

As a result, the group (which had kept its Socialist Group name all along) was renamed to the Group of the Party of European Socialists on 21 April 1993, and it became difficult to distinguish between the Party of European Socialists party and the political group. The group reverted to the Socialist Group in the European Parliament, which was close to its former name, on 20 July 2004. Despite all this, the group was still universally referred to as PES, notwithstanding the 2009 name change to the Progressive Alliance of Socialists and Democrats to accommodate the Democratic Party of Italy.

| Group name | English abbr. | French abbr. | Formal European Parliament name | From | To |
|---|---|---|---|---|---|
| Socialist Group | S | N/A | Group of the Socialists | 23 June 1953 | 1958 |
| Socialist Group | SOC | N/A | Socialist Group | 1958 | 21 April 1993 |
| Party of European Socialists | PES | PSE | Group of the Party of European Socialists (until 20 July 2004); Socialist Group in the European Parliament (since 20 July 2004) | 21 April 1993 | 23 June 2009 |
| Progressive Alliance of Socialists and Democrats | S&D | S&D | Group of the Progressive Alliance of Socialists and Democrats in the European Parliament | 23 June 2009 | present |

==== Liberals and centrists ====
Renew Europe has MEPs in 24 member states. Yellow indicates member states sending multiple MEPs, light yellow indicates member states sending a single MEP.

In European politics, liberalism tends to be associated with ideas inspired by classical and economic liberalism, which advocates limited government intervention in society. The Liberal Group contains diverse parties, including conservative-liberal, social-liberal and Nordic agrarian parties. It has previously been home to parties such as the minor French Gaullist party Union for the New Republic and the Social Democratic Party of Portugal, which were not explicitly liberal parties, but who were not aligned with either the Socialist or the Christian Democratic Groups. The Liberal Group was founded on 23 June 1953, under the name of the Group of Liberals and Allies. As the Parliament grew, it changed its name to the Liberal and Democratic Group.

This name change occurred in 1976; and was followed by the change to the Liberal and Democratic Reformist Group, which occurred on 13 December 1985; then to the Group of the European Liberal Democrat and Reform Party, which occurred on 19 July 1994; before settling on the name of the Group of the Alliance of Liberals and Democrats for Europe, starting from 20 July 2004, when the group was joined by the centrist parties that formed the European Democratic Party. As of 2020, its name is Renew Europe. ELDR Group leader Graham Watson MEP denounced the grand coalition in 2007 and expressed a desire to ensure that the posts of Commission President, Council President, Parliament President, and High Representative were not divided based on agreement between the two largest groups to the exclusion of third parties. Between 1994 and 1999, there was a separate European Radical Alliance, which consisted of MEPs of the French Energie Radicale, the Italian Bonino List, and regionalists aligned with the European Free Alliance.

| Group name | English abbr. | French abbr. | Formal European Parliament name | From | To |
|---|---|---|---|---|---|
| Liberal Group | L | N/A | Group of Liberals and Allies | 23 June 1953 | 1976 |
| Liberal and Democratic Group | LD | N/A | Liberal and Democratic Group | 1976 | 13 December 1985 |
| Liberal and Democratic Reformist Group | LDR | N/A | Liberal and Democratic Reformist Group | 13 December 1985 | 19 July 1994 |
| European Liberal Democratic and Reform Party | ELDR | N/A | Group of the European Liberal Democrat and Reform Party | 19 July 1994 | 20 July 2004 |
| European Radical Alliance | ERA | ARE | Group of the European Radical Alliance | 1994 | 1999 |
| Alliance of Liberals and Democrats for Europe | ALDE | ADLE | Group of the Alliance of Liberals and Democrats for Europe | 20 July 2004 | June 2019 |
| Renew Europe | RE | RE | Renew Europe group | 20 June 2019 | present |

==== Eurosceptic conservatives ====
European Conservatives and Reformists MEPs (2024-2029) has MEPs in 18 member states. Dark blue indicates member states sending multiple MEPs, light blue indicates member states sending a single MEP.

Parties from certain European countries have been unwilling to join the centre-right European People's Party Group. These parties generally have a liberal conservative but eurosceptic agenda. The first such Group was formed when the French Gaullists split from the Liberal Group on 21 January 1965, and created a new Group called the European Democratic Union, which is not to be confused with the association of conservative and Christian-democratic parties founded in 1978 called the European Democrat Union nor the Conservative Group called the European Democratic Group founded in 1979. The group was renamed on 16 January 1973, under the name Group of European Progressive Democrats, when the Gaullists were joined by the Irish Fianna Fáil and Scottish National Party, and renamed itself again on 24 July 1984, under the name Group of the European Democratic Alliance.

The European Democratic Alliance joined with MEPs from Forza Italia to become the Union for Europe, which occurred on 6 July 1995. This did not last and the Forza Italia MEPs left on 15 June 1998 to join the EPP, leaving Union for Europe to struggle on until it split on 20 July 1999. The French Rally for the Republic members joined the EPP, but Fianna Fáil and the Portuguese CDS–PP members joined a new group called the "Union for Europe of the Nations". After the 2009 Parliament elections, the Union for Europe of Nations was disbanded due to a lack of members, with the remaining members splitting into factions, with some joining with the remaining members of Independence/Democracy to form Europe of Freedom and Democracy, a new Eurosceptic group, and the remaining members joining with the former members of the European Democrat subgroup of the EPP-ED to form the European Conservatives and Reformists.

| Group name | English abbr. | French abbr. | Formal European Parliament name | From | To |
|---|---|---|---|---|---|
| European Democratic Union | N/A | UDE | European Democratic Union Group | 21 January 1965 | 16 January 1973 |
| European Progressive Democrats | EPD | DEP | Group of European Progressive Democrats | 16 January 1973 | 24 July 1984 |
| European Democratic Alliance | EDA | RDE | Group of the European Democratic Alliance | 24 July 1984 | 6 July 1995 |
| Union for Europe | UFE | UPE | Group Union for Europe | 6 July 1995 | 20 July 1999 |
| Union for Europe of the Nations | UEN | N/A | Union for Europe of the Nations Group | 20 July 1999 | 11 June 2009 |
| European Conservatives and Reformists | ECR | CRE | European Conservatives and Reformists Group | 24 June 2009 | present |

==== Greens and regionalists ====
Greens–European Free Alliance has MEPs in 17 member states. Dark green indicates member states sending multiple MEPs, light green indicates member states sending a single MEP.

In European politics, there has been a coalition between the greens and the stateless nationalists or regionalists (who also support devolution). In 1984, Greens and regionalists gathered into the Rainbow Group, a coalition of Greens, regionalists, and other parties of the left unaffiliated with any of the international organisations. In 1989, the group split: the Greens went off to form the "Green Group", whilst the regionalists stayed in Rainbow. Rainbow collapsed in 1994, and its members joined the European Radical Alliance under the French Energie Radicale. The Greens and regionalists stayed separate until 1999, when they reunited under the Greens/European Free Alliance banner.

| Group name | English abbr. | French abbr. | Formal European Parliament name | From | To |
|---|---|---|---|---|---|
| Rainbow Group | RBW | ARC | Rainbow Group: Federation of the Green Alternative European Left, Agalev-Ecolo, the Danish People's Movement against Membership of the European Community and the European Free Alliance in the European Parliament | 1984 | 1989 |
| Rainbow Group | RBW | ARC | Rainbow Group in the European Parliament | 1989 | 1994 |
| The Green Group | G | V | The Green Group in the European Parliament | 1989 | 1999 |
| The Greens–European Free Alliance | G/EFA, | Verts/ALE | Group of the Greens–European Free Alliance | 1999 | present |

==== Communists and socialists ====
The Left has MEPs in 14 member states. Dark red indicates member states sending multiple MEPs, light red indicates member states sending a single MEP.

The first communist group in the European Parliament was the Communist and Allies Group, which was founded on 16 October 1973. It stayed together until 25 July 1989, when it split into two groups, the Left Unity Group, which included 14 members, and the Group of the European United Lef (EUL), whch had 28 members. EUL collapsed in January 1993, after the Italian Communist Party became the Democratic Party of the Left and its MEPs joined the PES Group, leaving Left Unity as the only leftist group before the 1994 elections. The name was resurrected immediately after the elections when the Confederal Group of the European United Left was formed on 19 July 1994. On 6 January 1995, when parties from Sweden and Finland joined, the group was further renamed to the Confederal Group of the European United Left–Nordic Green Left (GUE/NGL). In January 2021, the GUE/NGL changed its name to The Left in the European Parliament – GUE/NGL.

| Group name | English abbr. | French abbr. | Formal European Parliament name | From | To |
|---|---|---|---|---|---|
| Communists and Allies | COM | N/A | Communist and Allies Group | 16 October 1973 | 25 July 1989 |
| European United Left | EUL | GUE | Group for the European United Left | 25 July 1989 | January 1993 |
| Left Unity | LU | CG | Left Unity | 25 July 1989 | 19 July 1994 |
| European United Left | EUL | GUE | Confederal Group of the European United Left | 19 July 1994 | 6 January 1995 |
| The Left in the European Parliament | EUL/NGL | GUE/NGL | Confederal Group of the European United Left–Nordic Green Left | 6 January 1995 | present |

==== Right-wing nationalists ====
Patriots for Europe has MEPs in 13 member states. Dark purple indicates member states sending multiple MEPs, light purple indicates member states sending a single MEP.

Europe of Sovereign Nations has MEPs in 8 member states. Dark blue indicates member states sending multiple MEPs, light blue indicates member states sending a single MEP.

In European politics, a grouping of nationalists has thus far found it difficult to cohere in a continuous group. The first nationalist group was founded by the French National Front and the Italian Social Movement in 1984, under the name of the Group of the European Right, and it lasted until 1989. Its successor, the "Technical Group of the European Right, existed from 1989 to 1994. There was then a gap of thirteen years until Identity, Tradition, Sovereignty, which was founded on 15 January 2007. This group lasted for nearly eleven months until it fell apart on 14 November 2007 due to in-fighting. A new radical right group was formed during the 8th parliament on 16 June 2015 under the name Europe of Nations and Freedom.

| Group name | English abbr. | French abbr. | Formal European Parliament name | From | To |
|---|---|---|---|---|---|
| European Right | ER | N/A | Group of the European Right | 24 July 1984 | 24 July 1989 |
| European Right | DR | N/A | Technical Group of the European Right | 25 July 1989 | 18 July 1994 |
| Identity, Tradition, Sovereignty | ITS | N/A | Identity, Tradition and Sovereignty Group | 15 January 2007 | 14 November 2007 |
| Europe of Nations and Freedom | ENF | ENL | Europe of Nations and Freedom Group | 16 June 2015 | 13 June 2019 |
| Identity and Democracy | ID | ID | Identity and Democracy Group | 13 June 2019 | 8 July 2024 |
| Patriots for Europe | PfE | PfE | Patriots for Europe Group | 8 July 2024 | Present |
| Europe of Sovereign Nations | ESN | ENS | Europe of Sovereign Nations Group | 10 July 2024 | Present |

==== Eurosceptics ====
The school of political thought that states that the competences of the European Union should be reduced or prevented from expanding further, is represented in the European Parliament by the Eurosceptics. The first Eurosceptic group in the European Parliament was founded on 19 July 1994. It was called the European Nations Group, and it lasted until 10 November 1996. Its successor was the Group of Independents for a Europe of Nations, founded on 20 December 1996. Following the 1999 European elections, the group was reorganised into the Group for a Europe of Democracies and Diversities, which occurred on 20 July 1999, and similarly reorganised after the 2004 election into the "Independence/Democracy Group", which occurred on 20 July 2004. The group's leaders were Nigel Farage (UKIP) and Kathy Sinnott (independent, Ireland). After the 2009 European elections, a significant proportion of the IND/DEM members joined the Europe of Freedom and Democracy, which included parties formerly part of the Union for a Europe of Nations. The EFD group's leaders were Farage and Francesco Speroni of the Lega Nord (Italy). With significant changes in membership after the 2014 European elections, the group was re-formed as Europe of Freedom and Direct Democracy, led by Farage and David Borrelli (Five Star Movement, Italy).

| Group name | English abbr. | French abbr. | Formal European Parliament name | From | To |
|---|---|---|---|---|---|
| Europe of Nations | EN | EDN | Europe of Nations Group (Coordination Group) | 19 July 1994 | 10 November 1996 |
| Independents for a Europe of Nations | I-EN | I-EDN | Group of Independents for a Europe of Nations | 20 December 1996 | 20 July 1999 |
| Europe of Democracies and Diversities | EDD | n/a | Group for a Europe of Democracies and Diversities | 20 July 1999 | 20 July 2004 |
| Independence/Democracy | IND/DEM | n/a | Independence/Democracy Group | 20 July 2004 | 11 June 2009 |
| Europe of Freedom and Democracy | EFD | ELD | Europe of Freedom and Democracy Group | 1 July 2009 | 24 June 2014 |
| Europe of Freedom and Direct Democracy | EFDD | ELDD | Europe of Freedom and Direct Democracy Group | 24 June 2014 | 26 June 2019 |

==== Heterogeneous ====
A group is assumed to have a set of core principles ("affinities" or "complexion") to which the full members are expected to adhere. This throws up an anomaly as groups get money and seats on committees that independent members do not get, but the total number of independent members may be greater than the members of the smaller groups. In 1979, MEPs got around this by forming a technical group, formally called the Group for the Technical Coordination and Defence of Independent Groups and Members, or CDI for short, as a coalition of parties ranging from centre-left to far-left, which were not aligned with any of the major international organizations. The CDI lasted until 1984.

On 20 July 1999, another technical group was formed, formally called the Technical Group of Independent Members – mixed group, or TGI for short. Since it contained far-right MEPs and centre-left MEPs, it could not possibly be depicted as having a common outlook. The Committee on Constitutional Affairs ruled that TGI did not have a coherent political complexion. The Parliament upheld (412 to 56 with 36 abstentions) the ruling, and TGI was thus disbanded on 13 September 1999, the first group to be forcibly dissolved. The ruling was appealed to the European Court of First Instance, and the group was temporarily resurrected on 1 December 1999, until the Court of First Instance came to a decision. On 3 October 2001, president Fontaine announced that the Court of First Instance had declared against the appeal, and that the disbandment was back in effect from 2 October 2001, the date of the declaration. Since then, the requirement that groups have a coherent political complexion has been enforced (for example with ITS), and gixed groups are not expected to appear again. TGI appeared on the list of political groups in the European Parliament for the last time on 4 October 2001.

| Group name | English abbr. | French abbr. | Formal European Parliament name | From | To |
|---|---|---|---|---|---|
| Technical Group of Independents | N/A | CDI | Group for the Technical Coordination and Defence of Independent Groups and Members | 20 July 1979 | 24 July 1984 |
| Technical Group of Independents | TGI | TDI | Technical Group of Independent Members – mixed group | 20 July 1999 | 4 October 2001 |

==== Independents ====
Independent MEPs that are not in a group are categorised as "Non-Inscrits" (the French term is universally used, even in English translations). This non-group has no group privileges or funding.

== See also ==
- Apportionment in the European Parliament
- Political organisations at European Union level
