= Independents for a Europe of Nations =

- European Parliament group
- I-EN logo
- Name: Independents for a Europe of Nations
- English abbr.: I-EN
- French abbr.: I-EDN
- Formal name: Group of Independents for a Europe of Nations
- Ideology: Euroscepticism
- From: 20 December 1996
- To: 20 July 1999
- Preceded by: Europe of Nations
- Succeeded by: Europe of Democracies and Diversities
- Chaired by: James Goldsmith (20 December 1996 to 12 May 1997); Jens-Peter Bonde (13 May 1997 to 19 July 1999); Johannes Blokland (18 September 1997 to 19 July 1999); Georges Berthu (13 May 1997 to 19 July 1999)
- MEP(s): 15 (5 May 1999)

Independents for a Europe of Nations was a Eurosceptic political group with seats in the European Parliament between 1996 and 1999.

== History ==
"Group of Independents for a Europe of Nations" was founded on 20 December 1996, succeeding the Europe of Nations group. Following the 1999 European elections, the Group was reorganised into the "Group for a Europe of Democracies and Diversities" on 20 July 1999.

== MEPs ==
MEPs in Independents for a Europe of Nations on 14 December 1998 were as follows:

Member state	MEPs	Party	MEPs	Notes
Denmark	4	June Movement	2	Ulla Margrethe Sandbæk, Jens-Peter Bonde
Denmark	4	People's Movement against the EU	2	Ole Krarup, Lis Jensen
France	8	Majorité pour l'autre Europe	8	Georges Berthu, Stéphane Buffetaut, Hervé Fabre-Aubrespy, Charles De Gaulle, Edouard C.M.P. Des Places, Françoise Seillier, Dominique F.C. Souchet, Frédéric Striby
Netherlands	2	SGP - GPV - RPF	2	Rijk Van Dam, Johannes Blokland
United Kingdom	1	Ulster Unionist Party	1	James Nicholson

MEPs in Independents for a Europe of Nations on 4 May 1999 were as follows:

Member state	MEPs	Party	MEPs	Notes
Denmark	4	June Movement	2	Ulla Margrethe Sandbæk, Jens-Peter Bonde
Denmark	4	People's Movement against the EU	2	Ole Krarup, Lis Jensen
France	8	Majorité pour l'autre Europe	8	Georges Berthu, Stéphane Buffetaut, Hervé Fabre-Aubrespy, Raymond Chesa, Edouard C.M.P. Des Places, Françoise Seillier, Dominique F.C. Souchet, Frédéric Striby
Netherlands	2	SGP - GPV - RPF	2	Rijk Van Dam, Johannes Blokland
United Kingdom	1	Ulster Unionist Party	1	James Nicholson

== Sources ==
- Konrad-Adenauer-Stiftung
- European Parliament
- Europe Politique
- BBC News
