= List of members of the European Parliament for Luxembourg, 1994–1999 =

This is a list of the 6 members of the European Parliament for Luxembourg in the 1994 to 1999 session.

== List ==
Name	National party	EP Group
Ben Fayot	Socialist Workers' Party	PES
Charles Goerens	Democratic Party	ELDR
Astrid Lulling	Christian Social People's Party	EPP
Viviane Reding	Christian Social People's Party	EPP
Marcel Schlechter	Socialist Workers' Party	PES
Jup Weber	The Greens	G

=== Party representation ===
National party	EP Group	Seats	±
Christian Social People's Party	EPP	2 / 6	▼1
Socialist Workers' Party	PES	2 / 6	Steady
Democratic Party	LD	1 / 6	Steady
The Greens	G	1 / 6	▲1
