= Ole Krarup =

Danish politician and professor

Dr Ole Krarup MEP
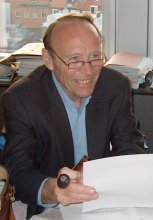

Member of the European Parliament
- In office 1994–2007
- Constituency: Denmark

Personal details
- Born: 17 March 1935 Aarhus
- Died: 7 October 2017 (aged 82)
- Party: People's Movement against the EU
- Education: University of Copenhagen
- Profession: Professor, law
- Website: www.olekrarup.dk

Ole Krarup (17 March 1935 – 7 October 2017) was a Danish EU politician and former professor of law at the University of Copenhagen.

== Political career ==
From 1994 through 2006 he was Member of the European Parliament with the Folkebevægelsen mod EU (People's Movement against the EU), Member of the Bureau of the European United Left - Nordic Green Left and sat on the European Parliament's Committee on Civil Liberties, Justice and Home Affairs and its Committee on Budgetary Control. Krarup was a substitute for the Committee on Constitutional Affairs and a member of the Delegation for relations with South Africa.

Krarup resigned as an MEP on 1 January 2007 due to medical consequences after a traffic accident while riding his bicycle in Strasbourg in 2006. He was succeeded by MEP Søren Bo Søndergaard.

== Death ==
Krarup died on 7 October 2017 at the age of 82.
