= Henri de Lassus Saint-Geniès =

French politician

Henri de Lassus Saint-Geniès (born 2 April 1938) is a French politician.

== Early life and education ==
de Lassus Saint-Geniès was born in Paris on 2 April 1938. He studied at the Central School for Arts and Manufacturing Industries and the Massachusetts Institute of Technology.

== Political career ==
From 1977 to 1989, de Lassus Saint-Geniès served on the Toulouse municipal council. Between 1997 and 1999, he was a Member of the European Parliament for France. He additionally served as vice president of the Radical Socialist Party.
