= Lis Jensen =

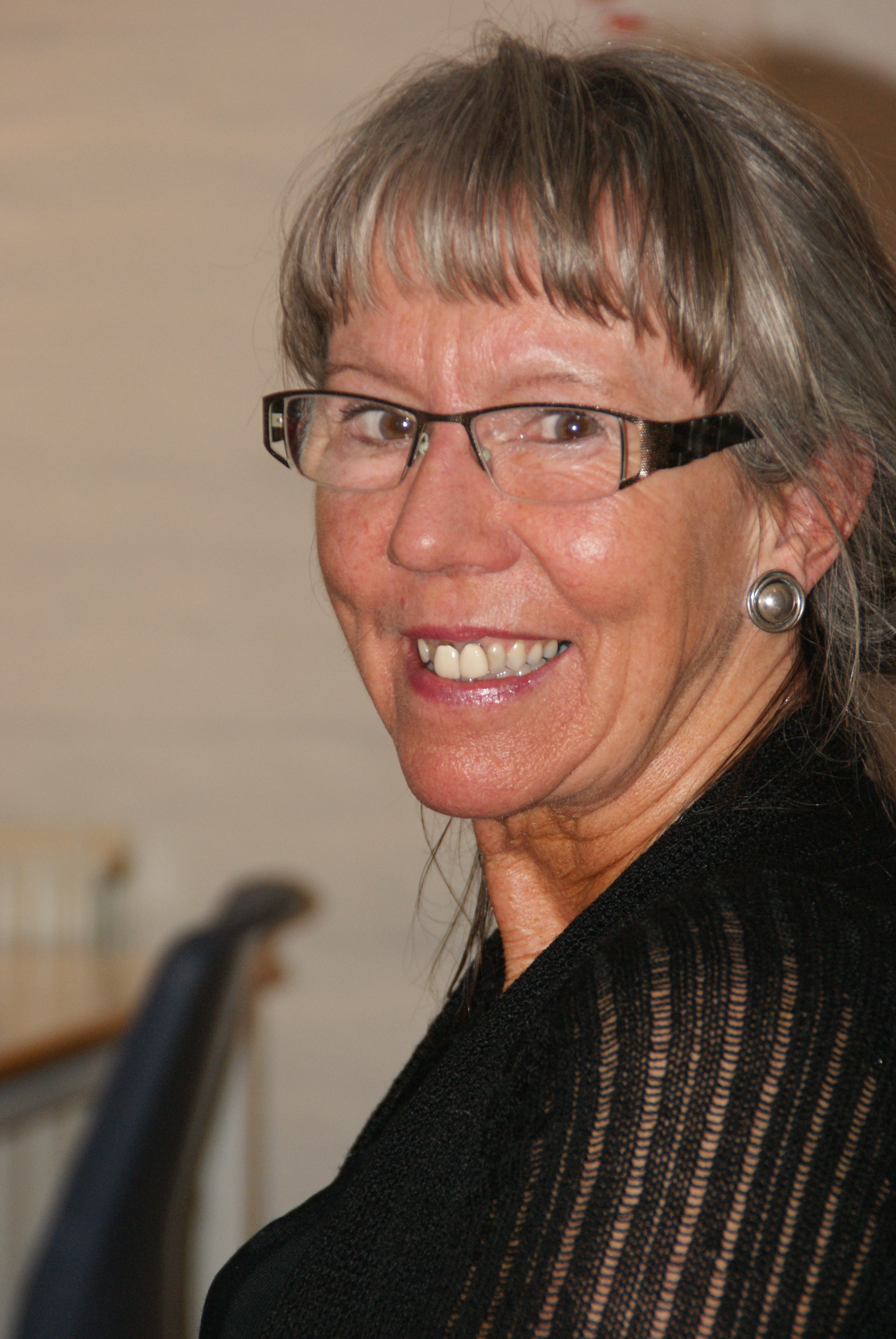

Member of the European Parliament
- In office 1994–1999
- Constituency: Denmark

Personal details
- Born: 6 July 1952 (age 73)
- Party: People's Movement against the EU

Lis Jensen (Danish pronunciation: [ˈlis ˈjensn̩]; born 1952 in Kås) is a Danish social worker and former member of the European Parliament for the People's Movement against the EU.

She was a member of the social affairs committee in the European Parliament and her political motive was fear of how European Union legislation could affect the Danish welfare state and unions
