= European Radical Alliance =

Former regionalist political group of the European Parliament (1994–1999)

- European Parliament group
- ERA logo
- Name: European Radical Alliance
- English abbr.: ERA
- French abbr.: ARE
- Formal name: Group of the European Radical Alliance
- Ideology: Regionalism
- Associated organisations: European Free Alliance
- From: 19 July 1994
- To: 20 July 1999
- Preceded by: Rainbow Group
- Succeeded by: Greens–European Free Alliance
- Chaired by: Catherine Lalumière
- MEP(s): 19 (19 July 1994), 21 (5 May 1999), 13 (13 June 1999)

The Group of the European Radical Alliance (ERA) was a heterogeneous political group with seats in the European Parliament between 1994 and 1999. It was formed by regionalist parties from the former Rainbow Group, although its largest and dominant member party was the French Energie Radicale.

== History ==
In 1989 the Rainbow Group split. The Greens went off to form the Green Group, whilst the Regionalists stayed in the rump of Rainbow Group. The 1994 elections saw a considerable reduction in Regionalist representation in the Parliament, with only the Canary Isles autonomists, Lega Nord, the Scottish National Party (SNP) and People's Union (VU) keeping their MEPs. But Lega Nord had been suspended from the European Free Alliance following its decision to join the coalition Italian government alongside the right-wing National Alliance. Given this reduction in numbers, the weakened EFA were no longer able to maintain their own group.

The French Energie Radicale were considered centrist enough to be possible members of the ELDR Group (their successors, the Radical Party of the Left, became observers in the ELDR Party in 2006) but instead they allied themselves with the members of the Pannella-Reformers List and the rump EFA to form the Group of the European Radical Alliance.

The ERA stayed in existence until 1999, when a loss of support forced the European Free Alliance members of the ERA to rejoin with the Green Group to create the Greens–European Free Alliance (Greens/EFA) group.

== Member parties on 19 July 1994 ==
Member state	Party	MEPs	Notes
France	Energie Radicale	13	
United Kingdom	Scottish National Party	2	
Italy	Pannella-Reformers List	2	
Belgium	People's Union/Flemish Free Democrats	1	
Spain	Canarian Coalition	1	Isidoro Sánchez García

== Sources ==
- "Regionalist Parties in Western Europe", ISBN 0-415-16437-0, de Winter & Türsan 1998
- Democracy in the European Parliament
- Development of Political Groups in the European Parliament
- Group names 1999
- Europe Politique
- European Parliament MEP Archives
- European Union Basics FAQ, by Roland Siebelink & Bart Schelfhout
- OneEurope magazine
- ELDR
