= Europe of Democracies and Diversities =

Former Eurosceptic political group of the European Parliament (1999–2004)

- European Parliament group
- Name: Europe of Democracies and Diversities
- English abbr.: EDD
- French abbr.: EDD
- Formal name: Europe of Democracies and Diversities Group
- Ideology: Euroscepticism
- European parties: Alliance of Independent Democrats in Europe
- From: 20 July 1999
- To: 20 July 2004
- Preceded by: Group of Independents for a Europe of Nations
- Succeeded by: Independence/Democracy
- Chaired by: Jens-Peter Bonde
- MEP(s): 16 (20 July 1999)
- Website: europarl.eu.int/edd

Europe of Democracies and Diversities (EDD) was a Eurosceptic political group with seats in the European Parliament between 1999 and 2004. Following the 2004 European elections, the group reformed as Independence/Democracy (IND/DEM).

== Members ==
Country	Name		Ideology	Membership	MEPs
France	Hunting, Fishing, Nature, Tradition	CPNT	Agrarianism; Euroscepticism	1999–2004	6 / 626
Denmark	June Movement	JB	Euroscepticism	1999–2004	3 / 626
Netherlands	Christian Union – Reformed Political Party	CU–SGP	Christian democracy Euroscepticism	1999–2004	3 / 626
United Kingdom	UK Independence Party	UKIP	Right-wing populism Euroscepticism	1999–2004	3 / 626
Denmark	People's Movement against the EU	FmEU	Euroscepticism	1999–2004	1 / 626
France	Combats Souverainistes	CS	Conservatism; Euroscepticism	2001–2004	1 / 626
Poland	League of Polish Families	LPR	National conservatism Euroscepticism	May–July 2004	1 / 626
