= Rainbow Group (1989–1994) =

- European Parliament group
- Name: Rainbow Group (1989–1994)
- English abbr.: RBW
- French abbr.: ARC
- Formal name: Rainbow Group in the European Parliament
- Ideology: Regionalism
- Associated organisations: European Free Alliance
- From: 1989
- To: 1994
- Preceded by: Rainbow Group
- Succeeded by: European Radical Alliance
- Chaired by: Jaak Vandemeulebroucke
- MEP(s): 13 (25 July 1989)

The Rainbow Group in the European Parliament was a regionalist political group in the European Parliament from 1989 to 1994.

== History ==
In 1989 the previous Rainbow Group split. For the third term of the European Parliament, the green parties formed The Green Group, whilst the regionalist parties stayed in the remaining Rainbow Group.

This second Rainbow Group was the highpoint of the European Free Alliance (EFA) to that date.

But the 1994 elections saw a considerable reduction in Regionalist representation in the Parliament, with only the Canarian Coalition, Lega Nord, Scottish National Party and People's Union keeping their MEPs. But Lega Nord had been suspended from the EFA following its decision to join the Italian coalition government alongside the right-wing National Alliance. The weakened EFA was no longer able to maintain their own group, and instead allied with members of the French Energie Radicale to form the Group of the European Radical Alliance.

== Sources ==
- "Regionalist Parties in Western Europe", ISBN 0-415-16437-0, de Winter & Türsan 1998
- Development of Political Groups in the European Parliament
- Europe Politique
- Democracy in the European Parliament
- European Parliament MEP Archives
