= Europe of Nations =

European Parliament group

European Nations Group
- European Parliament group
- EN logo
- Name: European Nations Group
- English abbr.: EN
- French abbr.: EDN
- Formal name: Europe of Nations Group (Coordination Group)
- Ideology: Euroscepticism
- From: 19 July 1994
- To: 10 November 1996
- Preceded by: n/a
- Succeeded by: Independents for a Europe of Nations
- Chaired by: James Goldsmith (19 July 1994 to 10 November 1996)
- MEP(s): 19 (19 July 1994)

The Europe of Nations Group was a Eurosceptic political group with seats in the European Parliament between 1994 and 1996.

== History ==
The Europe of Nations Group (Coordination Group) was formed on 19 July 1994. It was the first Eurosceptic Group in the Parliament. It lasted until 10 November 1996. The group was succeeded by the Independents for a Europe of Nations from 20 December 1996.

== MEPs ==
MEPs in Europe of Nations Group (Coordination Group) on 1 August 1994 were as follows:

Country	Name		Ideology	MEPs	Notes
France	Movement for France	MPF	Conservatism; Social conservatism	13 / 567	Charles De Gaulle, Georges Berthu, James Goldsmith, Françoise Seillier, Hervé Fabre-Aubrespy, Frédéric Striby, Philippe de Villiers, Anne Christine Poisson, Marie-France De Rose, Edouard C.M.P. Des Places, Dominique F.C. Souchet, Philippe-Armand Martin, Thierry Jean-Pierre
Netherlands	SGP–GPV		Social conservatism Euroscepticism	2 / 567	Leen Van Der Waal, Johannes Blokland
Denmark	June Movement	JB	Euroscepticism	2 / 567	Ulla Margrethe Sandbæk, Jens-Peter Bonde
Denmark	People's Movement against the EU	FmEU	Euroscepticism	2 / 567	Ole Krarup, Lis Jensen

== See also ==
- Europe of Nations and Freedom (2015-2019)
- Democracy in the European Parliament
- Europe Politique
- France Politique
- Archive of European Integration
- European Parliament
