= Hans Blokland (politician) =

Dutch politician (born 1943)

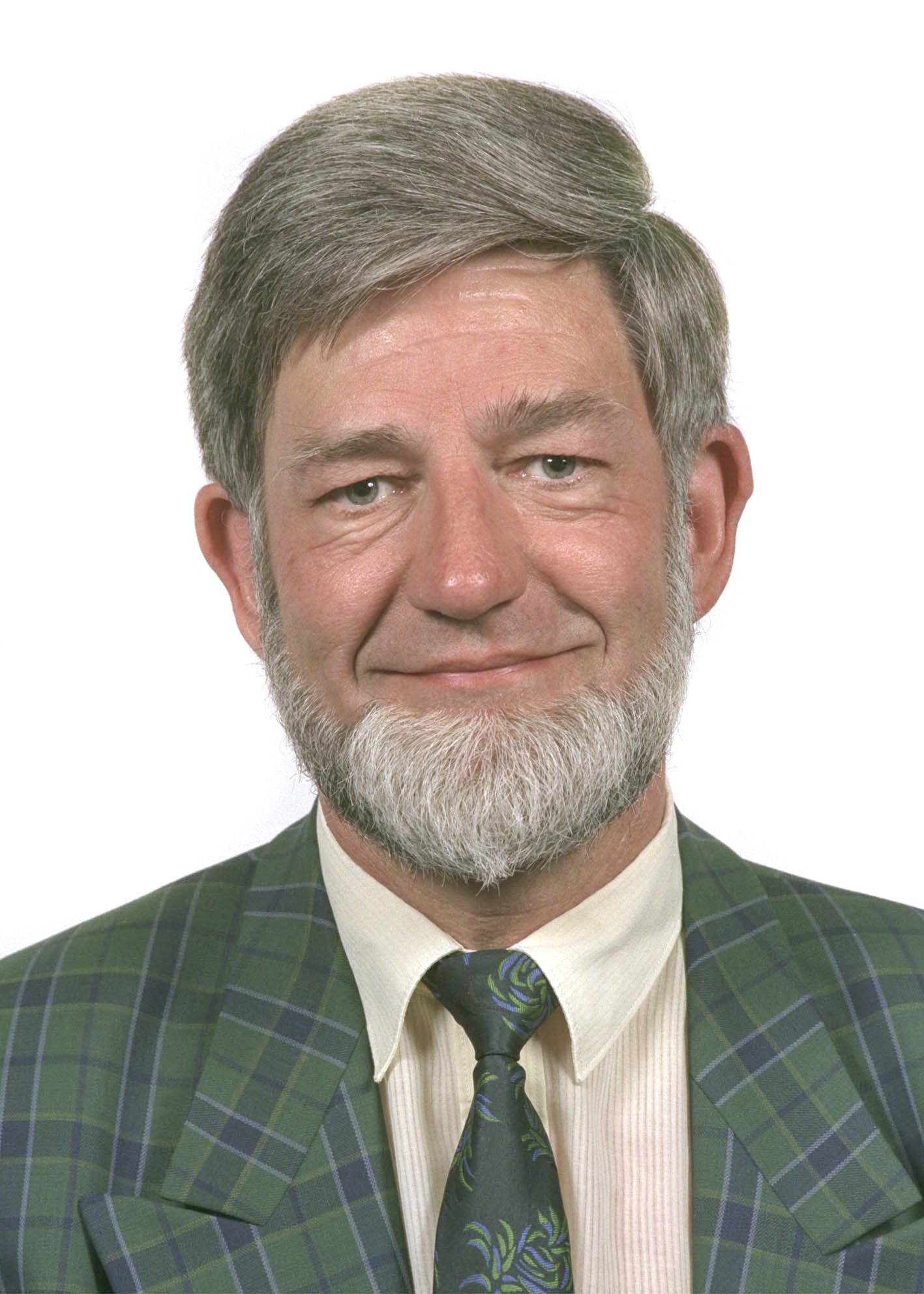
- Blokland in 1994

Member of the European Parliament
- In office 1994–2009

Personal details
- Born: Johannes Blokland; 5 March 1943 (age 83) Oegstgeest, Netherlands
- Party: Christian Union

Johannes (Hans) Blokland (born 5 March 1943) is a Dutch former politician who was a Member of the European Parliament. He is a member of the ChristianUnion, former treasurer of the Independence and Democracy group, and former vice-chair of the European Parliament's Committee on the Environment, Public Health and Food Safety.

He is also a former member of the Committee on Civil Liberties, Justice and Home Affairs, a former substitute for the Committee on Transport and Tourism, a former member of the delegation to the EU–Armenia, EU–Azerbaijan and EU–Georgia Parliamentary Cooperation Committees, a former member of the delegation to the EU–Kazakhstan, EU–Kyrgyzstan and EU–Uzbekistan Parliamentary Cooperation Committees, and for relations with Tajikistan, Turkmenistan and Mongolia, and a former substitute for the delegation for relations with the People's Republic of China.

== Education ==
- Higher degree in economics (1970)
- Doctorate in economics (1976)

== Career ==
- Researcher, Netherlands Economic Institute (1969–1976)
- Lecturer, Erasmus University (1971–1988)
- Head of the planning department, National Land Use Planning Agency (1976–1980)
- Head of the research department, Central Statistical Office (1980–1982)
- Member of the Advisory Committee on Foreigners, Ministry of Justice (1987–2000)
- Vice-Chairman of the GPV local party (1973–1974)
- Member of the executive, GPV provincial party (1976–1977)
- provincial chairman, GPV (1977–1981)
- Member of the GPV administrative committee (1978–1984)
- Chairman of the GPV (1984–1994)
- Member of the Capelle aan den IJssel Municipal Council (1974–1994)
- Alderman of Capelle aan den IJssel (1982–1986)
- Member of the South Holland Provincial Council (1982–1995)
- Member of the European Parliament (1994–2009)
- Co-Chairman of the EDN Group (1997–1999)
- Co-Chairman of the EDD Group (1999–2004)
- Vice-Chairman and Treasurer of the IND/DEM Group (?–2009)
