= Francis Wurtz =

French politician

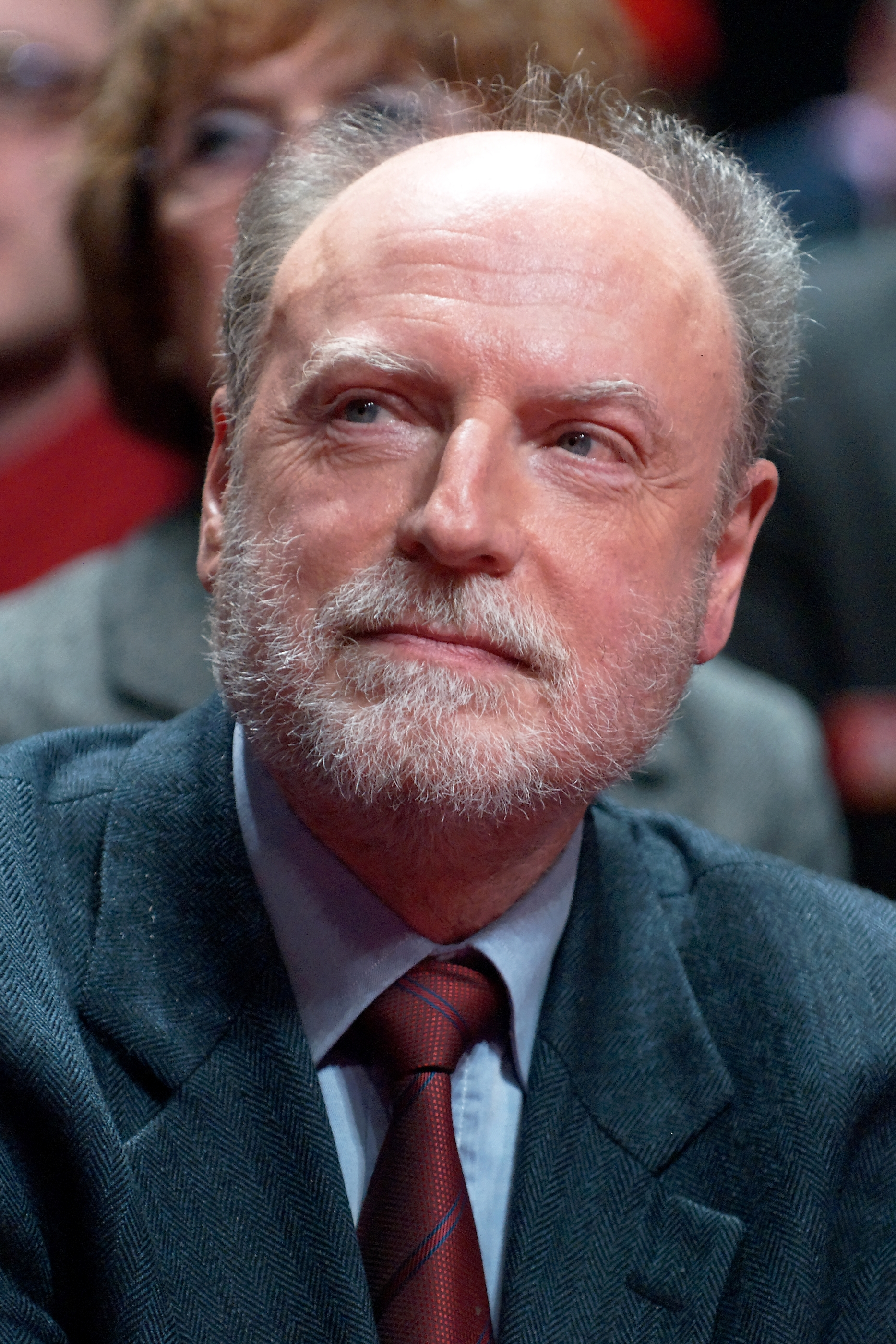
Francis Wurtz during a rally for the 2009' European Parliament elections in France, 8 March 2009

Francis Wurtz (born 3 January 1948 in Strasbourg) is a former French Member of the European Parliament, serving from 1979 until 2009. Elected in the Île-de-France constituency on the French Communist Party (PCF) ticket, he sat with the European United Left - Nordic Green Left (GUE/NGL) group, and was its President. He was nominated by GUE/NGL as their candidate for President of the European Parliament in the 2004 election, where he received 51 votes.

A university graduate in literature (philosophy), he worked for a time as a State school teacher. He has been a member of the central committee of the PCF since 1979.
