= The Green Group in the European Parliament =

Former green political group of the European Parliament (1989–1999)

The Green Group
- European Parliament group
- The Green Group logo
- Name: The Green Group
- English abbr.: G
- French abbr.: V
- Formal name: The Green Group in the European Parliament
- Ideology: Green politics
- Associated organisations: European Federation of Green Parties
- From: 25 July 1989
- To: 20 July 1999
- Preceded by: Rainbow Group
- Succeeded by: Greens–European Free Alliance
- Chaired by: Maria Amélia Santos, Alexander Langer, Claudia Roth
- MEP(s): 30 (25 July 1989), 27 (30 May 1994), 23 (19 July 1994), 27 (5 May 1999), 38 (13 June 1999)

The Green Group in the European Parliament was a Green political group with seats in the European Parliament between 1989 and 1999.

== History ==
In 1989 the Rainbow Group split, with the Greens forming a group called "The Green Group in the European Parliament", and the Regionalists remaining within a continuing but diminished Rainbow Group. The Greens and Regionalists stayed within separate parliamentary groups until 1999, when the two Groups reunited under the European Greens–European Free Alliance banner.

== Nomenclature ==
The group's formal name was "The Green Group in the European Parliament", not the "Green Group in the European Parliament". Unlike other groups, "The" was part of the formal name of the group.
