= Turing scheme =

UK student exchange programme

Logo of the Turing scheme

The Turing scheme is a student exchange programme. It was established by the United Kingdom Department for Education in 2021 as a replacement for the European Union Erasmus Programme. The scheme aims to fund the advantages of overseas learning to three categories of participants, young students at primary and secondary schools, older sixth form students and further education university students.

The Turing scheme will be discontinued after the 2026-2027 academic year in favour of the UK's return to the Erasmus Programme which will happen on 1st January 2027.

== History ==
=== Choice of name ===
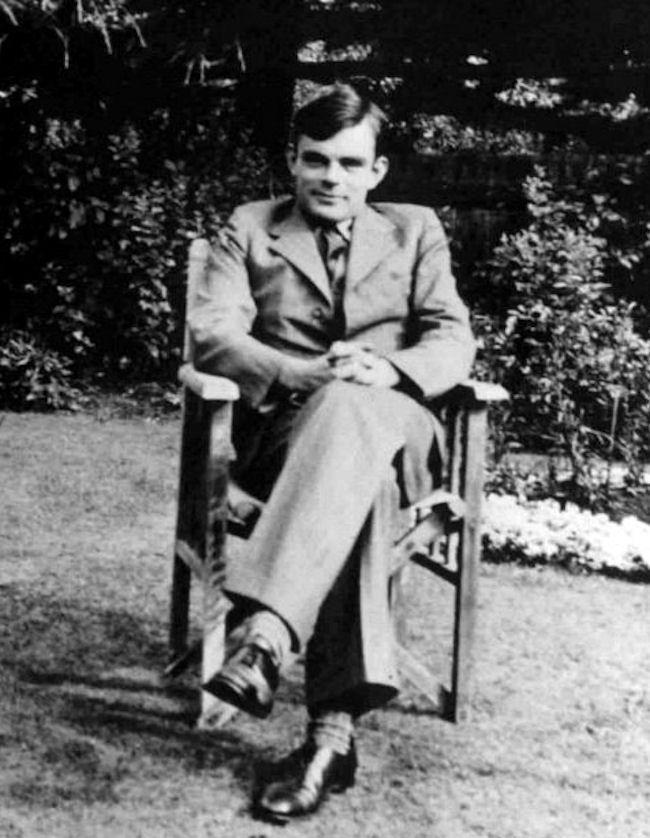
Photograph of Alan Turing in 1930

The Erasmus programme was named after the Dutch scholar Erasmus, whereas the new programme was named after Alan Turing the English mathematician, computer scientist, logician, cryptanalyst, philosopher and theoretical biologist. Turing was highly influential in the development of theoretical computer science, providing a formalisation of the concepts of algorithm and computation with the Turing machine, which can be considered a model of a general-purpose computer. Turing is widely considered to be the father of theoretical computer science and artificial intelligence. Despite these accomplishments, he was never fully recognised in his home country during his lifetime due to the prevalence of homophobia at the time and because much of his work was covered by the Official Secrets Act.

=== The proposal ===
In December 2020, following the announcement of a trade deal with the EU and the decision to no longer participate in the EU's Erasmus Programme which has seen over 200,000 UK students benefit from the scheme since 1987, the British government announced the funding of £100m a year to enable up to 35,000 UK students, especially those from deprived backgrounds, to study abroad at some of the best universities in the world, not just limited to EU universities, or undertake work placements abroad, starting in September 2021.

Michel Barnier, the EU's chief negotiator, expressed regret at the UK's decision not to participate in Erasmus, a decision Boris Johnson said had been hard to take, but the UK could not justify staying in the "extremely expensive" Erasmus+ scheme that saw twice as many EU students coming to the UK compared to UK students going to universities elsewhere in the EU.

The original proposal was expanded to include children as young as 4 on school organised trips or exchange programmes abroad lasting up to two months and older sixth form students on higher education or vocational courses, with the possibility of undertaking longer experiences of up to a year overseas.

== Operation ==
From 2014 to 2020, the British Council and Ecorys UK jointly administered the Erasmus programme. Initially the Turing scheme was administered by the same organisations. They launched the Turing scheme website in February 2021.

The Turing scheme set out to provide grants to students to help fund their international experience from September 2021. Successful applicants included primary schools in County Durham.

After a procurement exercise in 2021, the delivery of the Turing scheme was awarded to Capita Business Services, who delivered it until December 2023. From the 2024 to 2025 academic year, the scheme was delivered directly by the Department for Education (DfE).

Wales decided to opt out of the Turing system, creating their own called "Taith", which became operational in September 2022 with all eight Welsh universities receiving funding. Welsh students can still participate in Turing.

In Scotland, students at universities have access to Turing for international experience.

Northern Ireland university students can utilise the Turing scheme and from September 2023 are also able to access Erasmus+ through the Irish government's offer of funding assistance.

There were 159 countries participating in the Turing scheme in 2022.

== Higher education scheme ==
Open to British Overseas Territories and UK higher education and training organisations.

Proposals are submitted by each institution for all their students who are seeking to receive grants towards travel and a daily subsistence for an overseas placement to gain international experience for enhanced skills. Additional grants are available for students with limited family resources or disabilities.

=== Participation in the higher education scheme ===
In 2023–2024, 124 institutions successfully bid for funding from the Turing scheme to support nearly 23,000 higher education students to travel abroad, the most popular country was the United States with 2,057 students, France, Spain and Germany were close behind. 84% of students go to countries where English is not the main language.

== Further education and Vocational education and training ==
Open to UK and British Overseas Territories Further Education, Vocational Education and traineeships in the post-16, sixth form college area, with companies who have trainees and apprentices also welcome to apply for grants for overseas learning or placement in a work experience environment.

Open to eligible students or recent graduates and those not in permanent education or training who may be re-training or up-skilling. Whilst overseas, participants will undertake studies or training for 2 weeks to 12 months or for skills competitions abroad for 1 to 10 days, provided by further education or vocational training providers or companies. For trips outside Europe the minimum time must be 15 days.

The establishment must submit a proposal for their students seeking grants to help with travel and a daily subsistence, with additional help available for eligible students.

== Schools funding projects ==
Primary and Secondary Schools can submit a proposal to take groups of pupils overseas, seeking grants towards the travel and subsistence, with additional funds for the organisers.

Students aged 4 to 13 are limited to short term placements, 3 days to 2 months whilst older students can also go on longer placements of up to 6 months. Pupils do not need to be UK nationals.

== Statistics ==
Year	Successful applications	Participants				Destination countries	Funding	Note
Year	Successful applications	Higher Education	Further & Vocational	Schools	Total	Destination countries	Funding	Note
2021–2022	373	28,997	6,888	5,139	41,024	>150	£98.5m	
2022–2023	316	23,472	9,958	4,944	38,374	>160	£106.1m	
2023–2024	474	22,847	10,570	6,789	40,206	>160	£104.6m	

== Sources ==
- Beavers, Anthony (2013). "Alan Turing: Mathematical Mechanist". In Cooper, S. Barry; van Leeuwen, Jan (eds.). Alan Turing: His Work and Impact. Waltham: Elsevier. pp. 481–485. ISBN 978-0-12-386980-7.
- Sipser, Michael (2012). Introduction to the Theory of Computation. Cengage Learning. ISBN 9781285401065.
