= CETS141 =

1990 Council of Europe convention

Strasbourg Convention
Convention on Laundering, Search, Seizure and Confiscation of the Proceeds from Crime (CETS 141)
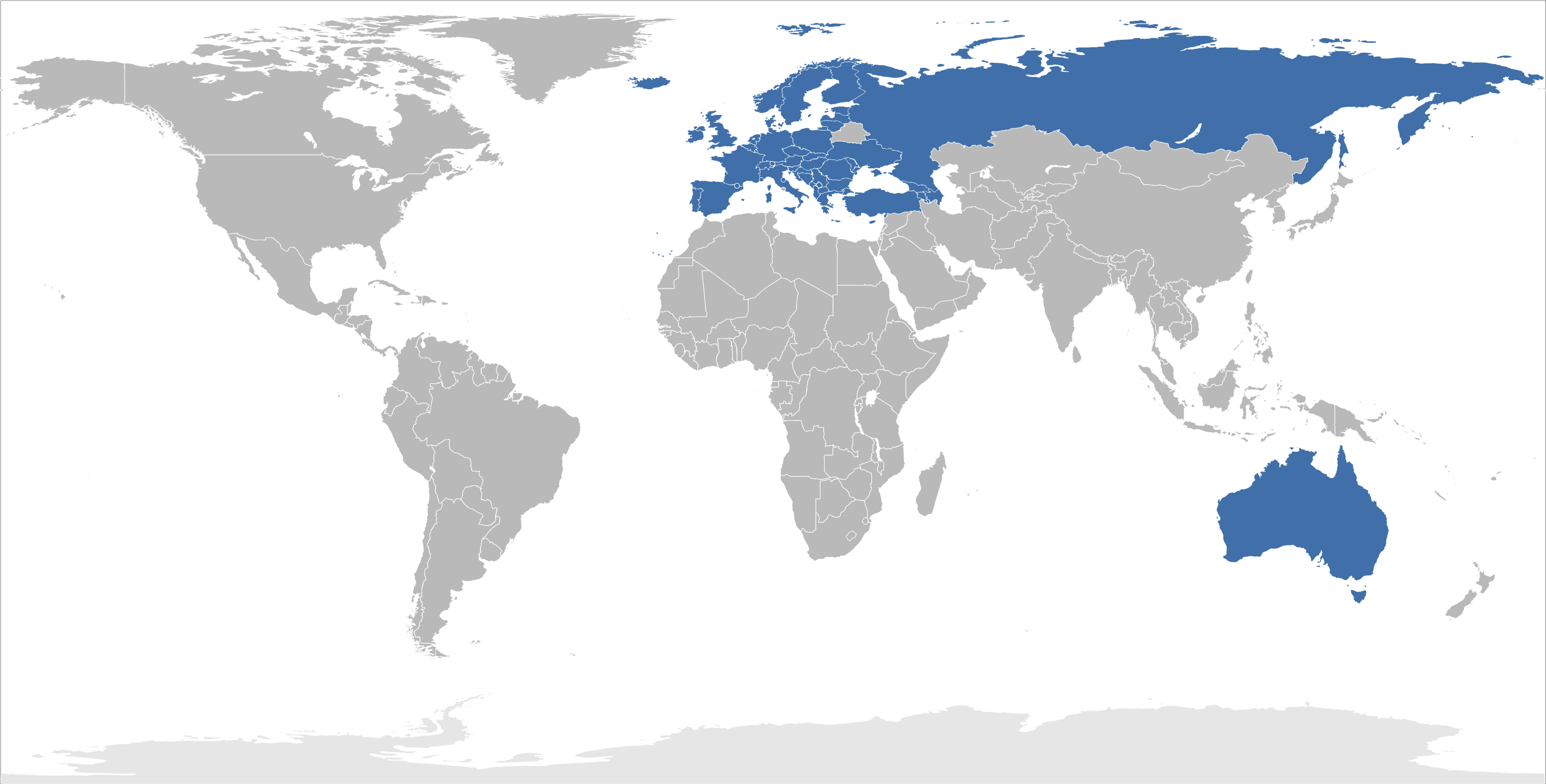
- Participation in the Strasbourg Convention Signed and ratified Only signed
- Type: Money laundering; International criminal law
- Signed: 8 November 1990
- Location: Strasbourg, France
- Effective: 1 September 1993
- Condition: Ratification by 3 Council of Europe member States
- Parties: 48: Albania; Andorra; Armenia; Australia; Austria; Azerbaijan; Belgium; Bosnia and Herzegovina; Bulgaria; Croatia; Cyprus; Czech Republic; Denmark; Estonia; Finland; France; Georgia; Germany; Greece; Hungary; Iceland; Ireland; Italy; Latvia; Liechtenstein; Lithuania; Luxembourg; Macedonia; Malta; Moldova; Monaco; Montenegro; Netherlands; Norway; Poland; Portugal; Romania; Russia; San Marino; Serbia; Slovakia; Slovenia; Spain; Sweden; Switzerland; Turkey; Ukraine; United Kingdom
- Depositary: Secretary General of the Council of Europe
- Languages: English and French

The Convention on Laundering, Search, Seizure and Confiscation of the Proceeds from Crime, also known as the Strasbourg Convention or CETS 141, is a Council of Europe convention which aims to facilitate international co-operation and mutual assistance in investigating crime and tracking down, seizing and confiscating the proceeds thereof. The convention is intended to assist States in attaining a similar degree of efficiency even in the absence of full legislative harmony.

Parties undertake in particular to criminalise the laundering of the proceeds of crime and to confiscate instrumentalities and proceeds (or property the value of which corresponds to such proceeds).

For the purposes of international co-operation, the Convention provides for forms of investigative assistance (assistance in procuring evidence, transfer of information to another State without a request, adoption of common investigative techniques, lifting of bank secrecy etc.), provisional measures (freezing of bank accounts, seizure of property to prevent its removal) and measures to confiscate the proceeds of crime (enforcement by the requested State of a confiscation order made abroad, institution by the requested State, of domestic proceedings leading to confiscation at the request of another State).

The convention was drafted between October 1987 and June 1990 by a committee of governmental experts under the authority of the European Committee on Crime Problems (CDPC) and was approved by the Committee of Ministers in September 1990. It was opened for signature on 8 November 1990 and subsequently entered into force on 1 September 1993. The convention was last ratified by Georgia on 13 May 2004, bringing the number of parties to 48.

The scope of the Strasbourg Convention has been further expanded by the 2005 Warsaw Convention.

== History ==
At their 15th Conference in Oslo (17-19 June 1986), the European Ministers of Justice discussed the penal aspects of drug abuse and drug trafficking, including the need to combat drug abuse by smashing the drugs market, which was often linked with organised crime and even terrorism, for example by freezing and confiscating the proceeds from drug trafficking. The creation of a Select Committee of Experts on international cooperation as regards search, seizure and confiscation of the proceeds from crime (PC-R-SC) was proposed by the CDPC at its 36th Plenary Session in June 1987 and authorised by the Committee of Ministers in September 1987. The PC-R-SC's terms of reference were to examine the applicability of European penal law conventions to the search, seizure and confiscation of the proceeds from crime – and consider this question, in the light of the ongoing work of the Pompidou Group and the United Nations, in particular as regards the financial assets of drug traffickers. The PC-R-SC could prepare, if needed, an appropriate European legal instrument in this field.

The draft convention was prepared at nine meetings of the Select Committee between October 1987 and April 1990. The draft convention was finalised by the CDPC at its 39th Plenary Session in June 1990 and forwarded to the Committee of Ministers. At the 443rd meeting of their Deputies in September 1990, the Committee of Ministers approved the text of the convention and decided to open it for signature on 8 November 1990.

== Purpose of the Convention ==
One of the purposes of the convention was to facilitate international co-operation for investigative assistance, search, seizure and confiscation of the proceeds from all types of criminality, and in particular drug offences, arms dealing, terrorist offences, trafficking in children and young women and other offences which generate large profits. The committee noted that not all States possessed domestic laws which would enable them to combat serious criminality efficiently. Investigations, searches, seizures and other measures were often carried out on the basis of codes of criminal procedure which were drafted a number of years ago. In respect of confiscation, the member States' legislation differed widely, in respect of both substantive and procedural rules. As a result, it was felt that international cooperation which traditionally depends on shared concepts and principles of law might be seriously impaired.

Another of the main purposes of the convention is to provide an instrument obliging States to adopt efficient measures in their national laws to combat serious crime and to deprive criminals of the fruits of their illicit activities. Once again, wide discrepancy in national legislations and lack of powers for some law enforcement agencies was sometimes exploited by criminals to avoid detection and punishment.

A third purpose of the convention was to complement already existing instruments, drawn up within the framework of the Council of Europe, such as the European Convention on Mutual Assistance in Criminal Matters, the European Convention on the International Validity of Criminal Judgments and the European Convention on the Transfer of Proceedings in Criminal Matters.

In order to overcome certain shortcomings encountered in the above-mentioned European penal law conventions, CETS 141 sought to provide a complete set of rules, covering all the stages of the procedure from the first investigations to the imposition and enforcement of confiscation sentences and to allow for flexible but effective mechanisms of international co-operation to the widest extent possible. The goal was, in effect, to take the profit out of crime.

This goal was attained through the adoption of several types of measures, including mutual assistance in order to secure evidence about instrumentalities and proceeds; co-operation upon learning about events in relation to criminal activity, even without a request; and measures to ensure that the offender does not remove the instruments and proceeds of his criminal activities, such as through the "freezing" of bank accounts, seizure of property or other measures of conservancy.

== General considerations ==
=== Cooperation ===
In order to secure the confiscation of the instruments and proceeds from crime, the Convention provides two forms of international co-operation. Firstly, the execution by the requested State of a confiscation order made abroad and, secondly, the institution, under its own law, of national proceedings leading to a confiscation by the requested State at the request of another State.

International co-operation need not only be effective, it must also be flexible. The Convention provides therefore for the possibility of refusal and postponement of co-operation. Flexibility is also shown in the distinction between the grounds for refusal, only some of which are valid for all kinds of international co-operation. Moreover, the grounds for refusal are all optional at the international level. Only a limited number of the grounds will be mandatory at national level. The Convention provides also that the Parties shall, before refusing or postponing co-operation, consult each other and consider whether the request may be granted partially or subject to conditions.

In order to protect the legitimate interests of third parties, the Convention provides for certain notification requirements and for situations where it may not be possible to recognise decisions concerning third parties. Moreover, the Convention imposes an obligation on each Party to provide in its domestic legislation for effective legal remedies available to third parties to have their rights (which may be affected by provisional or confiscation measures) preserved.

=== National legislation ===
The need for efficient national legal remedies was considered by the PC-R-SC from the point of view of international cooperation. Differences in legislation may impede the successful fight against more organised, international and increasingly dangerous forms of criminality. The PC-R-SC considered it necessary for member States to align their respective legislations and to adopt efficient measures to investigate offences, to take provisional measures and to confiscate the instruments and fruits of illegal activity. Although this did not entail a complete harmonisation of States’ legislation, it did require States to find ways and means to enable them to co-operate more effectively.

=== Confiscation mechanisms ===
The PC-R-SC identified considerable differences with regard to the basic systems of confiscation at national level in the member States of the Council of Europe. All States have a system of so-called property confiscation, that is, the confiscation of specific property, with respect to the instrumentalities used in the commission of offences, including items or substances whose uncontrolled possession is in itself illegal. Some States also know property confiscation for the proceeds, directly or indirectly derived from offences, or their substitutes. As a result of property confiscation, the ownership rights in the specific property concerned are transferred to the State.

With regard to the proceeds from offences, another system of confiscation is widely used in some States: so-called value confiscation, which consists of the requirement to pay a sum of money based on an assessment of the value of the proceeds directly derived from offences, or their substitutes. As a result of a value confiscation, the State can exert a financial claim against the person against whom the order is made, which, if not paid, may be realised in any property (no matter whether legally or illegally acquired) belonging to that person. The order is thus executed in a similar way to fines or court orders in civil cases.

Some States have, as far as the confiscation of proceeds is concerned, the two systems (both property and value confiscation) available under their domestic law. In order to properly take into account these basic differences in national legislation, it was agreed to put the two systems (value and property confiscation) of confiscation on an equal footing and to make the text unambiguous on this point.

The PC-R-SC also stressed that the successful fight against serious criminality required the introduction of a laundering offence in States which had not already introduced such an offence.

International co-operation relating to confiscation requires that efficient instruments be put at the disposal of law enforcement agencies. Since property (aircraft, vessels, money, etc.) might be moved from one country to another in a matter of days, hours and sometimes minutes, it is necessary that rapid measures may be taken in order to "freeze" a current situation to enable the authorities to take the necessary steps.

== Structure of the Convention ==
Note: This section summarizes the articles of the Strasbourg Convention. For more information, see the full text of the Convention.

PREAMBLE
CHAPTER I – USE OF TERMS

- Article 1 – Use of terms

CHAPTER II – MEASURES TO BE TAKEN AT NATIONAL LEVEL

- Article 2 – Confiscation measures
- Article 3 – Investigative and provisional measures
- Article 4 – Special investigative powers and techniques
- Article 5 – Legal remedies
- Article 6 – Laundering offences

CHAPTER III – INTERNATIONAL CO-OPERATION

Section 1 – Principles of international co-operation

- Article 7 – General principles and measures for international co-operation

Section 2 – Investigative assistance

- Article 8 – Obligation to assist
- Article 9 – Execution of assistance
- Article 10 – Spontaneous information

Section 3 – Provisional measures

- Article 11 – Obligation to take provisional measures
- Article 12 – Execution of provisional measures

Section 4 – Confiscation

- Article 13 – Obligation to confiscate
- Article 14 – Execution of confiscation
- Article 15 – Confiscated property
- Article 16 – Right of enforcement and maximum amount of confiscation
- Article 17 – Imprisonment in default

Section 5 – Refusal and postponement of co-operation

- Article 18 – Grounds for refusal
- Article 19 – Postponement
- Article 20 – Partial or conditional granting of a request

Section 6 – Notification and protection of third parties' rights

- Article 21 – Notification of documents
- Article 22 – Recognition of foreign decisions

Section 7 – Procedural and other general rules

- Article 23 – Central authority
- Article 24 – Direct communication
- Article 25 – Form of request and languages
- Article 26 – Legalisation
- Article 27 – Content of request
- Article 28 – Defective requests
- Article 29 – Plurality of requests
- Article 30 – Obligation to give reasons
- Article 31 – Information
- Article 32 – Restriction of use
- Article 33 – Confidentiality
- Article 34 – Costs
- Article 35 – Damages

CHAPTER IV – FINAL PROVISIONS

- Article 36 – Signature and entry into force
- Article 37 – Accession to the Convention
- Article 38 – Territorial application
- Article 39 – Relationship to other conventions and agreements
- Article 40 – Reservations
- Article 41 – Amendments
- Article 42 – Settlement of disputes
- Article 43 – Denunciation
- Article 44 – Notifications

== Participation ==
=== Modalities ===
Under Article 36 of CETS 141, the convention was opened for signature by the member States of the Council of Europe and non-member States which participated in its elaboration. Instruments of ratification, acceptance or approval are deposited with the Secretary General of the Council of Europe. The Convention entered into force on the first day of the month following the expiration of a period of three months after the date on which three States, of which at least two are member States of the Council of Europe, expressed their consent to be bound by the convention. Following the ratifications of the United Kingdom, Switzerland and the Netherlands, the Convention entered into force on 1 September 1993. For any signatory State subsequently expressing its consent to be bound by it, the Convention enters into force on the first day of the month following the expiration of a period of three months after the date of the expression of its consent to be bound by the convention.

=== Participation by Council of Europe members ===
The Strasbourg Convention has currently been signed and ratified by all 47 Council of Europe member States.

- Albania
- Andorra
- Armenia
- Austria
- Azerbaijan
- Belgium
- Bosnia and Herzegovina
- Bulgaria
- Croatia
- Cyprus
- Czech Republic
- Denmark
- Estonia
- Finland
- France
- Georgia
- Germany
- Greece
- Hungary
- Iceland
- Ireland
- Italy
- Latvia
- Liechtenstein
- Lithuania
- Luxembourg
- Macedonia
- Malta
- Moldova
- Monaco
- Montenegro
- Netherlands
- Norway
- Poland
- Portugal
- Romania
- Russia
- San Marino
- Serbia
- Slovakia
- Slovenia
- Spain
- Sweden
- Switzerland
- Turkey
- Ukraine
- United Kingdom

=== Participation by non-Council of Europe members ===
Under Article 37 of CETS 141, the Committee of Ministers of the Council of Europe, after consulting the Contracting States to the convention, may invite any State not a member of the council and not having participated in its elaboration to accede to this convention, by a decision taken by the majority provided for in Article 20.d. of the Statute of the Council of Europe and by the unanimous vote of the representatives of the Contracting States entitled to sit on the committee.

It is nevertheless customary for the non-member State to request accession in a letter addressed to the Secretary General of the Council of Europe. The letter should be signed by the Minister for Foreign Affairs or a diplomatic representative acting upon instructions of his/her government.

In respect of any acceding State the Convention shall enter into force on the first day of the month following the expiration of a period of three months after the date of deposit of the instrument of accession with the Secretary General of the Council of Europe.

Australia is currently the only non-Council of Europe member to have signed and ratified the convention. Australia signed the convention on 28 September 1992, ratified it on 31 July 1997 and the Convention subsequently entered into force on 1 November 1997.

== See also ==
- Asset forfeiture
