= 2005 Warsaw Convention =

Council of Europe convention about money laundering and crime investigation

Warsaw Convention
Council of Europe Convention on Laundering, Search, Seizure and Confiscation of the Proceeds from Crime and on the Financing of Terrorism
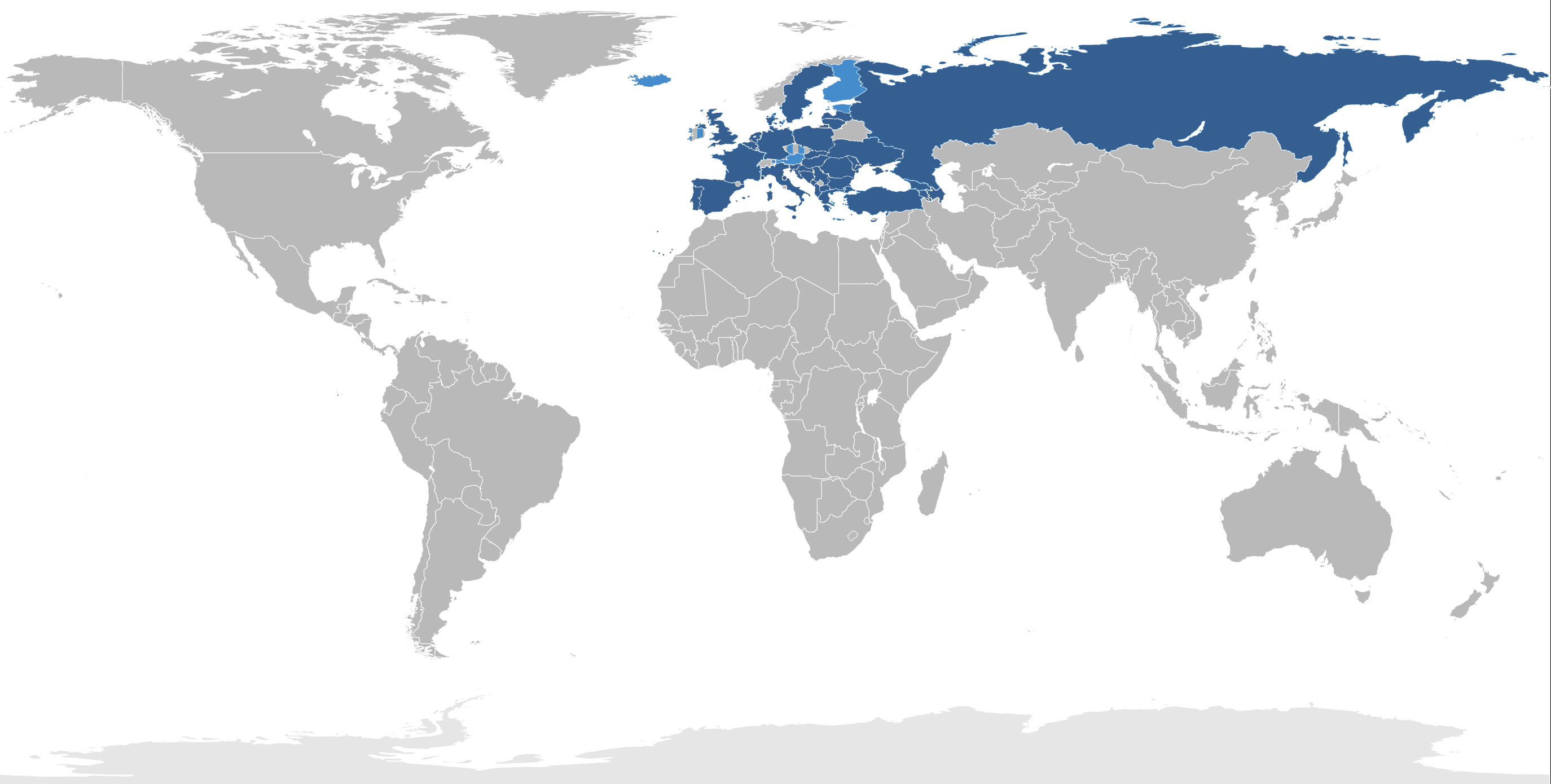
- Participation in the Warsaw Convention Signed and ratified Only signed Affected by the EU's signature
- Type: Money laundering; International criminal law
- Drafted: 3 May 2005
- Signed: 16 May 2005
- Location: Warsaw, Poland
- Effective: 1 May 2008
- Condition: Six ratifications, including four Council of Europe States
- Signatories: 39
- Parties: 28
- Depositary: Secretary General of the Council of Europe
- Languages: English and French

The Council of Europe Convention on Laundering, Search, Seizure and Confiscation of the Proceeds from Crime and on the Financing of Terrorism, also known as the Warsaw Convention or CETS 198, is a Council of Europe convention which aims to facilitate international co-operation and mutual assistance in investigating crime and tracking down, seizing and confiscating the proceeds thereof.

This convention is the first international treaty covering both the prevention and the control of money laundering and the financing of terrorism. This instrument recognises that quick access to financial information or information on assets held by criminal organisations, including terrorist groups, is the key to successful preventive and repressive measures, and, ultimately, is the best way to stop them.

CETS 198 builds on and updates the 1990 Strasbourg Convention; it takes into account the fact that terrorism can be financed not only through money laundering from criminal activity, but also through legitimate activities. The convention also includes a mechanism to ensure the proper implementation by Parties of its provisions.

The convention was opened for signature in Warsaw on 16 May 2005 and entered into force on 1 May 2008. It was last ratified by Turkey in May 2016, bringing the number of parties to 28. It has been signed but not ratified by another 11 states plus the European Union.

== History ==
=== Context ===
Money laundering involves a series of complicated financial operations (deposit, withdrawals, bank transfers, etc.) which ultimately results in criminal money becoming "clean" and acceptable for legitimate business purposes. This laundered criminal money is recycled through normal businesses and thus may penetrate legitimate markets and corrupt entire economies.

Misuse of the financial system is not limited to money laundering schemes designed to preserve and maximise proceeds from crimes which have been committed. The financial system is misused in similar ways to fund terrorist atrocities. After the September 11 attacks, the international community rapidly recognised the important similarities between the processes involved in money laundering and in the financing of terrorism. Traditionally, the financing of terrorism stemmed from illegal activities, e.g. bank robberies, weapons and drug trafficking, etc. However, in recent years, a new phenomenon had grown: the carrying out of legitimate activities to finance terrorist actions. In this case, the phenomenon is the opposite of money laundering: the "clean" money collected through charities, legitimate commercial activities and so on, can be used to finance terrorist actions. The above considerations led to the Council of Europe's decision to update the 1990 Strasbourg Convention.

=== Updating the 1990 Strasbourg Convention ===
One of the major purposes of the 1990 Strasbourg Convention was to facilitate international cooperation in the area of money laundering, which could only be accomplished if steps were taken to minimise the significant differences of approach which then existed in the domestic legal systems of member States. CETS 198 has left the general structure of the 1990 Convention untouched.

At the time of its elaboration, the Select Committee of Experts which drafted the 1990 Convention was not in a position to draw upon a settled and developed body of domestic law and practice. International cooperation in this sphere was relatively unknown. Indeed, save for the limited scope provided by the 1988 United Nations Convention Against Illicit Traffic in Narcotic Drugs and Psychotropic Substances, the area was a new one for the vast majority of members of the international community.

In the period of over ten years which had elapsed since the text of the 1990 Convention was adopted, valuable experience had been gained. The mutual evaluation procedures of the Financial Action Task Force on Money Laundering (FATF), which updated its Recommendations in 1996 and 2003, and added 8 Special Recommendations in 2001 and one more in 2004, and the similar work undertaken by the MONEYVAL, had provided valuable insights into the problems which had arisen both in the domestic implementation of anti-money laundering measures, and in international cooperation. The remits of these two evaluative bodies had also been extended to cover assessment of the effectiveness of measures taken in jurisdictions to counter terrorist financing.

Further debate on this issue had been stimulated by developments in other fora. On 26 June 2001, the European Union had adopted the Framework Decision on money laundering, the identification, tracing, freezing, seizing and confiscation of instrumentalities and the proceeds from crime. This includes, inter alia, significant movement towards a harmonised implementation of certain critical provisions of the 1990 Convention concerning action at the domestic level as well as embodying agreement on practices designed to enhance the effectiveness of international cooperation. The European Union Council Directive of June 1991 on prevention of the use of the financial system for the purpose of money laundering was also substantially amended in December 2001. At the time, the commission had presented a proposal for a Third Money Laundering Directive and a Regulation on control of cash entering or leaving the Community; these proposals were being discussed in the European Parliament and the Council of the EU and the Third EU AML Directive was adopted in 2005.

Other important initiatives that have taken place in recent years include the development and expansion of the Egmont Group of Financial Intelligence Units, the adoption of the United Nations Convention against Transnational Organized Crime, Convention against Corruption and Terrorist Financing Convention as well as the emergence of international pressure through the imposition of counter-measures on "non-cooperative countries and territories", which were not in conformity with international standards.

=== Drafting of the Warsaw Convention ===
Discussion within the Council of Europe started as early as 1998 on the advisability of drafting an updating Protocol to the 1990 Convention and on the scope of such an exercise should it be undertaken. Given differences of view among member States, a questionnaire-based enquiry was conducted on the subject in 2000. It emerged from this enquiry that a clear majority of States were in support of an early opening of negotiations on a protocol. The Reflection Group on the advisability of drawing up an additional protocol to the convention on laundering, search, seizure and confiscation of the proceeds from crime (PC-S-ML) submitted its report to the CDPC at its 51st plenary session on 17–21 June 2002 and made specific suggestions as to the possible content of such a treaty.

The European Committee on crime problems (CDPC) entrusted at the end of 2003, the Committee of experts on the revision of the convention on laundering, search, seizure and confiscation of the proceeds from crime (PC-RM) to draw up such a protocol.

These terms of reference were revised in March 2004 and read as follows:

"Within the context of the negotiations of the draft Protocol, consideration should be given to the introduction of provisions concerning the prevention of money laundering and the financing of terrorism:

a. as regards preventive measures, consideration should be given, for instance, to introducing a context-setting provision or provisions on measures of prevention to facilitate subsequent coverage of the treatment of the powers and duties of FIUs, particularly those dealing with the duty to control (identification and verification of the identity of clients, identification of beneficial owners, suspicious transactions' reports), the definition of FIUs and the principles of co-operation between them, as well as transparency of legal entities. Such provision or provisions, if introduced, should make appropriate reference to existing international standards and, particularly, a reference to the FATF recommendations on money laundering and terrorist financing either in the Preamble to the Protocol or as a self-standing provision;

b. as regards financing of terrorism, consideration should be given to introducing one or several provisions ensuring the application of the provisions of the 1990 Money Laundering Convention to the fight against the financing of terrorism and which, while giving added value, are in full conformity with internationally accepted standards, including the UN International Convention on the suppression of the financing of terrorism;

c. a mechanism should also be found to ensure that the Convention, as revised by the Protocol, could be adapted accordingly, should the internationally accepted standards referred to therein be changed."

The PC-RM developed a text which both added to and modified provisions of the 1990 Convention. Owing to the extent of the modifications envisaged and the enlargement of the scope of the treaty to include issues concerning the financing of terrorism, the drafters felt that this text should be a self-standing Convention, rather than a Protocol to 1990 Convention. The CDPC approved this convention on 11 March 2005 and transmitted it to the Committee of Ministers for adoption. The Committee of Ministers adopted this convention on 3 May 2005.

== General considerations ==
At the time of drafting, there was no single dedicated international treaty covering both the prevention and the control of money laundering and the financing of terrorism. The existing legally binding international instruments provided for a range of specific measures which focused on law enforcement and international cooperation (e.g. criminalisation of money laundering, confiscation, provisional measures, international cooperation), but the preventative aspects were mostly left unregulated by international law or addressed in somewhat general terms.

Since the adoption of the 1990 Convention, money laundering techniques and anti-money laundering strategies had significantly evolved. For example, laundering techniques increasingly targeted the non-financial sector and used professional intermediaries to invest criminal proceeds in the legitimate economy. Many jurisdictions had set up Financial Intelligence Units to process suspicious or unusual transaction reports and thus triggered more laundering investigations. Those changes needed to be followed up by reassessing the convention's focus, adjusting some of its requirements and supplementing it with additional provisions. In addition, some of these changes had already been included in standards set by other international fora (European Union, United Nations, FATF), which a new convention could not ignore. Rather, the text of the new Convention brought into line with these new developments to ensure mutual consistency with these standards and to make possible harmonised domestic responses in an appropriate legal format.

Owing to the efficiency shown in practice of anti-money laundering techniques to combat also the financing of terrorism, the Warsaw aimed to expand the scope of its predecessor in order to be used in the fight against terrorism and its financing, while taking into account existing international instruments (e.g. the 1999 UN Terrorist Financing Convention). The events of 11 September 2001 had forced countries around the globe to take quick action to freeze terrorist funds and it appeared that many of them had serious difficulties in coping with this requirement: some were unable to rapidly trace property or bank accounts; others had to stretch the limits of legality to respond to requests or provide the evidence requested. The world had realised that quick access to financial information or information on assets held by criminal organisations, including terrorist groups, was a key to successful preventive and repressive measures and for disrupting their activities.

The main reasons for including provisions concerning the financing of terrorism in the Warsaw Convention were the following:

a. the clear link between the financing of terrorism and money laundering is internationally recognised, particularly in the context of the mandate of the FATF and its 40 + 9 Recommendations, the UN, the EU, the World Bank, the IMF and the mandate of MONEYVAL;
b. the tools which have proved effective to counter money laundering should be equally effective in combating the financing of terrorism;
c. the current co-operation between FIUs already covers, in practice, questions relating to the financing of terrorism;
d. as this Convention includes provisions on the role and functioning of FIUs, it would have been difficult to de-couple questions relating to the financing of terrorism;
e. information exchanged by FIUs is now used and may also be used in the future for the purposes of fighting the financing of terrorism.

The remit of CETS 198 is therefore wider than that of the 1990 Convention, as it covers laundering and confiscation, but also financing of terrorism. As to the latter, the Convention first stresses the necessity for States to take immediate steps to ratify and implement fully the 1999 UN Terrorist Financing Convention, thereby recognizing its fundamental value in defining an international legal framework to cut terrorists off from their funds. The reference to the UN Convention aims at stressing the crucial importance of this treaty in the global fight against the financing of terrorism. It recognises that the 1999 UN Terrorist Financing Convention provides, for the first time, an agreed global framework within which the international community can collaborate more effectively in seeking to fight the financing of terrorism.

Finally, the Warsaw Convention aimed to improve international co-operation, inter alia, by taking into account the development of new investigative techniques adopted in other international fora, as those contained in the EU Protocol of 16 October 2001 to the European Convention on Mutual Assistance in Criminal Matters.

The Warsaw Convention brings added value to the current international standards in the following areas:

- proof of the predicate offence;
- the mental element for the money laundering offence, which may be mere suspicion;
- the liability of legal persons;
- the lack of supervision or control by a natural person over a legal person;
- the definition of laundered property;
- confiscation of property;
- the reversibility of the burden of proof;
- management of frozen or seized property;
- the granting of supervisory and monitoring powers to non-banking financial institutions;
- international assistance and cooperation between FIUs;
- the postponement of suspicious transactions on request of a foreign FIU.

== Conference of the Parties ==
To achieve all these objectives, the Warsaw Convention provides for a separate monitoring mechanism for States parties, the "Conference of the Parties" (COP198) which ensures that the provisions of CETS 198 are applied.

In order to lead its activities, and according to its Rules of Procedure, the Conference of the Parties elects a Bureau from among its Parties, for a period of two years, a president and vice-president, as well as three other members, for the term of office of one year, who together constitute the Bureau. The Bureau assists the President and ensures the preparation and continuity of meetings. The Conference of the Parties may appoint scientific experts whose role is to provide neutral, experienced opinions where necessary and to assist the President and Secretariat in ensuring the consistency of the Conference's outputs. The Conference of the Parties is also assisted by a Secretariat provided by the Council of Europe.

At its first meeting, the COP agreed that it would not duplicate the assessments of MONEYVAL or the FATF, and therefore that it would only assess those parts of CETS 198 that add value to the current global standards. The assessment is undertaken by rapporteurs for legal, FIU and international co-operation issues, and is based on the replies by the assessed country to a detailed questionnaire. COP assessment reports are subject to discussion and approval by the Conference of the Parties, in accordance with its Rules of Procedure. All adopted reports of the Conference of the Parties are automatically published within four weeks of adoption, together with any comments from the relevant Party.

The COP meets once a year at its plenary meeting. Its activities include and are not limited to: the discussion and adoption of assessment reports in respect of contracting Parties; progress made by States in signing/ratifying the CETS No. 198; and possible amendments to the convention.

The COP also liaises and cooperates with other anti-money laundering bodies, including MONEYVAL and the FATF.

== Structure of the Convention ==
Note: This section summarizes the articles of the Strasbourg Convention. For more information, see the full text of the Convention.

PREAMBLE
CHAPTER I – USE OF TERMS

- Article 1 – Use of terms

CHAPTER II – FINANCING OF TERRORISM

- Article 2 – Application of the Convention to the financing of terrorism

CHAPTER III – MEASURES TO BE TAKEN AT NATIONAL LEVEL

Section 1 – General provisions

- Article 3 – Confiscation measures
- Article 4 – Investigative and provisional measures
- Article 5 – Freezing, seizure and confiscation
- Article 6 – Management of frozen or seized property
- Article 7 – Investigative powers and techniques
- Article 8 – Legal remedies
- Article 9 – Laundering offences
- Article 10 – Corporate liability
- Article 11 – Previous decisions

Section 2 – Financial intelligence unit (FIU) and prevention

- Article 12 – Financial intelligence unit (FIU)
- Article 13 – Measures to prevent money laundering
- Article 14 – Postponement of domestic suspicious transactions

CHAPTER IV – INTERNATIONAL CO-OPERATION

Section 1 – Principles of international co-operation

- Article 15 – General principles and measures for international co-operation

Section 2 – Investigative assistance

- Article 16 – Obligation to assist
- Article 17 – Requests for information on bank accounts
- Article 18 – Requests for information on banking transactions
- Article 19 – Requests for the monitoring of banking transactions
- Article 20 – Spontaneous information

Section 3 – Provisional measures

- Article 21 – Obligation to take provisional measures
- Article 22 – Execution of provisional measures

Section 4 – Confiscation

- Article 23 – Obligation to confiscate
- Article 24 – Execution of confiscation
- Article 25 – Confiscated property
- Article 26 – Right of enforcement and maximum amount of confiscation
- Article 27 – Imprisonment in default

Section 5 – Refusal and postponement of co-operation

- Article 28 – Grounds for refusal
- Article 29 – Postponement
- Article 30 – Partial or conditional granting of a request

Section 6 – Notification and protection of third parties' rights

- Article 31 – Notification of documents
- Article 32 – Recognition of foreign decisions

Section 7 – Procedural and other general rules

- Article 33 – Central authority
- Article 34 – Direct communication
- Article 35 – Form of request and languages
- Article 36 – Legalisation
- Article 37 – Content of request
- Article 38 – Defective requests
- Article 39 – Plurality of requests
- Article 40 – Obligation to give reasons
- Article 41 – Information
- Article 42 – Restriction of use
- Article 43 – Confidentiality
- Article 44 – Costs
- Article 45 – Damages

CHAPTER V – CO-OPERATION BETWEEN FIUS

- Article 46 – Co-operation between FIUs
- Article 47 – International co-operation for postponement of suspicious transactions

CHAPTER VI – MONITORING MECHANISM AND SETTLEMENT OF DISPUTES

- Article 48 – Monitoring mechanism and settlement of disputes

CHAPTER VII – FINAL PROVISIONS

- Article 49 – Signature and entry into force
- Article 50 – Accession to the Convention
- Article 51 – Territorial application
- Article 52 – Relationship to other conventions and agreements
- Article 53 – Declarations and reservations
- Article 54 – Amendments
- Article 56 – Notifications

== Participation ==
=== Modalities ===
Under Article 49, CETS 198 was opened for signature by the member States of the Council of Europe, the European Community and non‑member States which had participated in its elaboration. Instruments of ratification, acceptance or approval are deposited with the Secretary General of the Council of Europe. The Convention entered into force on the first day of the month following the expiration of a period of three months after the date on which 6 signatories, of which at least four are member States of the Council of Europe, expressed their consent to be bound by the convention. Following the ratifications of Albania, Bosnia and Herzegovina, Malta, Moldova, Poland and Romania, the Convention entered into force on 1 May 2008. For Signatories subsequently expressing their consent to be bound by it, the Convention enters into force on the first day of the month following the expiration of a period of three months after the date of the expression of its consent to be bound by the convention.

The European Union which was associated in the drafting of the convention, signed this instrument on 2 April 2009. There is an ongoing dialogue between the Conference of the Parties to the Convention and the European Union concerning legal issues associated with the ratification of the convention.

As from its entry into force, Parties to CETS 198, which are at the same time Parties to the 1990 Convention shall apply the provisions of this Convention in their mutual relationships; and shall continue to apply the provisions of the 1990 Convention in their relations with other Parties to the said Convention, but not to CETS 198.

=== Participation by Council of Europe members ===
The Warsaw Convention has currently been ratified by 28 member States of the Council of Europe and signed but not ratified by another 11, plus the European Union. Some other states also ratified the convention.The current Parties are:

- Albania
- Armenia
- Austria
- Azerbaijan
- Belgium
- Bosnia and Herzegovina
- Bulgaria
- Croatia
- Cyprus
- Estonia
- France
- Georgia
- Hungary
- Latvia
- Malta
- Moldova
- Montenegro
- Netherlands
- North Macedonia
- Poland
- Portugal
- Romania
- San Marino
- Serbia
- Slovakia
- Slovenia
- Spain
- Sweden
- Turkey
- Ukraine
- United Kingdom

=== Participation by non–Council of Europe members ===
Since its entry into force in 2008, the convention is also open for accession by other non-member States, provided that they have been formally invited to accede by the Committee of Ministers of the Council of Europe. To date, no non-member state has signed or acceded to the convention. Article 50, paragraph 1, of the Convention concerning the accession by non-member States reads as follows:

After the entry into force of this Convention, the Committee of Ministers of the Council of Europe, after consulting the Parties to the Convention, may invite any State not a member of the Council and not having participated in its elaboration to accede to this Convention, by a decision taken by the majority provided for in Article 20.d. of the Statute of the Council of Europe and by the unanimous vote of the representatives of the Parties entitled to sit on the Committee.

The procedure for the accession of a State which is not a member of the Council of Europe and which has not participated in the elaboration of the Convention may be summarised as follows.

In principle, the Committee of Ministers may take the initiative of inviting a non-member State to accede to a specific Convention. It is nevertheless customary for the non-member State to request accession in a letter addressed to the Secretary General of the Council of Europe. The letter should be signed by the Minister for Foreign Affairs or a diplomatic representative acting upon instructions of his or her government.

In line with the constant practice of the Council of Europe and before formally inscribing the point on the agenda of the Committee of Ministers, the Secretariat informally ascertains the opinion among member States' delegations.

Requests for accession to a Council of Europe convention are examined by a Committee of Ministers' rapporteur group and, then, by the Committee of Ministers. Once there is agreement in principle within the Committee of Ministers to give a positive reply to a request, the Committee of Ministers instructs the Secretariat (Treaty Office) to consult, where relevant, the other non-member States which are Parties to the convention. The non-member States are given a precise time-limit for giving their consent, usually two months.

Following the consultation of the non-member States which are Parties to the convention, the decision inviting the non-member State becomes definitive. In the case of the Council of Europe Convention on Laundering, Search, Seizure and Confiscation of the Proceeds from Crime and on the Financing of Terrorism, the decision on whether or not to issue an invitation has to be unanimously agreed by those Council of Europe members which are Parties to the convention. This decision is usually taken at the level of the Ministers' Deputies. Then, an invitation to accede to the convention is notified to the State concerned by the Secretariat General.

It is customary for the instrument of accession to be deposited at the seat of the Council of Europe in Strasbourg, in the presence of a representative of the acceding State and of the Secretary General of the Council of Europe or his Deputy. The representative of the acceding State brings with him or her the instrument of accession and a procès-verbal of deposit is signed by both parties. Should it prove difficult for the acceding State to send a representative to Strasbourg, the instrument of accession may be sent by diplomatic courrier. Deposit of the instrument of accession is notified to the members of the Council of Europe and to the other Parties to the convention.

Article 50, paragraph 2, of the Convention provides that it enters into force on the first day of the month following the expiration of a period of three months after the date of deposit of the instrument of accession with the Secretary General of the Council of Europe.

Subject to the applicable provisions of each convention and in line with the 1969 Vienna Convention on the Law of Treaties, any declarations or reservations are to be made when depositing the instrument of accession. For reasons of legal certainty and in order to ensure the uniform implementation of Council of Europe's conventions, reservations may not be made at any later date.

Article 33 of the Council of Europe Convention on Laundering, Search, Seizure and Confiscation of the Proceeds from Crime and on the Financing of Terrorism provides for the designation of a central authority to be made imperatively at the time of deposit of the instrument of accession.

== See also ==
- Asset forfeiture
