= Charles V European Award =

Charles V European Prize
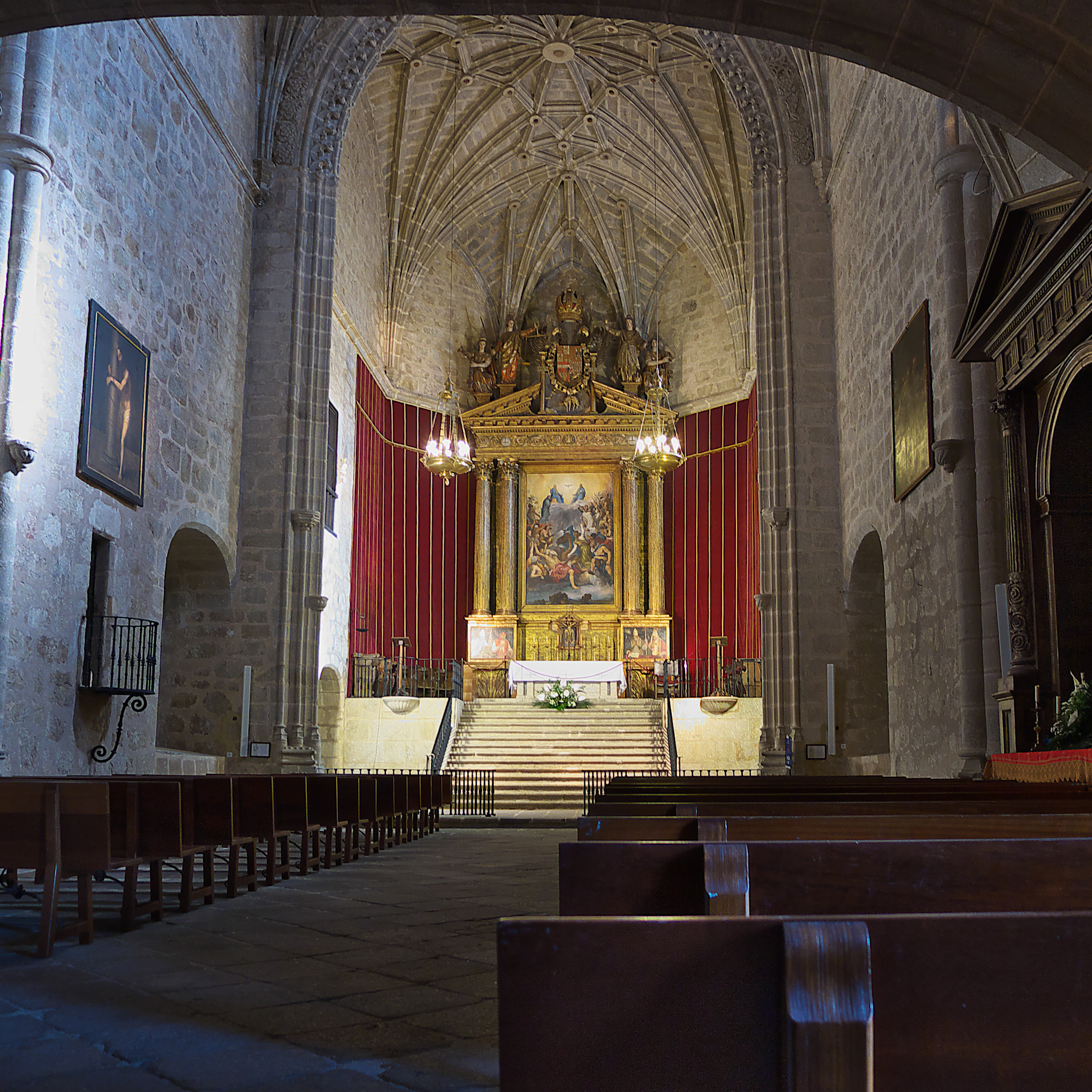
- Monastery of Yuste
- Awarded for: Commitment to the process of the European union or contribution to the exaltation of the cultural, scientific and historical values of Europe.
- Location: Yuste, Spain
- Presented by: European and Ibero-American Academy of Yuste Foundation
- First award: June 6, 1995; 31 years ago
- Website: www.fundacionyuste.org

The Charles V European Award is awarded by the European and Ibero-American Academy of Yuste Foundation. The award is delivered to those individuals, organisations, projects or initiatives who "with their effort and dedication, have contributed to the general understanding and appreciation of the cultural, scientific values, historians of Europe, as well as the process of unification of the European Community".

== History ==
The award bears the name of Charles V of Habsburg; it is given in Cuacos de Yuste, where Charles V died in 1558. Charles, born in Ghent (Flanders, Belgium) and descendant of Austrian and Spanish ancestors, ruled the Netherlands, Spain, Germany and other nations of Central Europe in the 16th century. He was a polyglot (speaking French, Dutch, Latin, Spanish, Italian, and German) and a believer in the medieval idea of a united Christian Europe. He was crowned emperor of the Holy Roman Empire, in the Aachen palatine chapel, the same place where previously Charlemagne had been crowned.

This award was established in 1995, to highlight the European spirit of Spain, similarly to other European prizes such as the Charlemagne Prize, awarded by the city of Aachen since 1950, and was presented to King Juan Carlos I in 1982.

== Recipients ==
- 1995. FRA Jacques Delors
- 1998. BEL Wilfried Martens
- 2000. ESP Felipe González Márquez
- 2002. RUS Mikhail Gorbachev
- 2004. POR Jorge Sampaio
- 2006. GER Helmut Kohl
- 2008. FRA Simone Veil
- 2011. ESP Javier Solana Madariaga
- 2013. POR José Manuel Durão Barroso
- 2016. ITA Sofia Corradi
- 2017. ESP Marcelino Oreja Aguirre
- 2018. ITA Antonio Tajani
- 2019. EUR Cultural Route of the Council of Europe
- 2021. GER Angela Merkel
- 2022. EUR European Disability Forum
- 2023. POR António Guterres
- 2024. ITA Mario Draghi
- 2025. ESP Josep Borrell

== By country ==
- Spain : 4
- Portugal, Italy : 3
- France, Germany : 2
- Belgium, Russia, Council of Europe : 1
