= Sofia Corradi =

Italian pedagogist (1934–2025)

- Born: Sofia Corradi; 5 September 1934; Rome, Italy
- Died: 17 October 2025 (aged 91); Rome, Italy
- Other names: Mother Erasmus, Mamma Erasmus
- Occupation: Pedagogist
- Known for: Instigator of the Erasmus Programme

Sofia Corradi (5 September 1934 – 17 October 2025) was an Italian pedagogist. She was born in Rome and studied law, becoming a researcher in the field of the right to education as a human right. After experiencing that a course she studied at Columbia University in the United States was not recognized by the Italian education system, she dedicated much of her life in promoting and developing what would become the Erasmus Programme, an exchange programme of students between European universities. She was nicknamed Mamma Erasmus or Mother Erasmus because of her role in promoting the programme.

== Life and career ==
Sofia Corradi was born in Rome on 5 September 1934. Her father worked for the Italian national railway company as an engineer. Her parents had an international outlook.

She studied law at the Sapienza University of Rome. In 1957, in her fourth year of studies, she received the opportunity to study in the United States thanks to a Fulbright scholarship. She spent a year at Columbia University where she attended a master’s course in comparative university legislation. Upon her return to Rome in 1958, however, her degree was not recognised by the Italian educational system. She recalled how she felt humiliated in front of other students as her time in the US was dismissed as a "vacation", and how a functionary had told her "Columbia, you say? I've never heard of that before". She had to spend an extra year to obtain her Italian degree. The experience led her to the idea of creating a system of recognition of courses taken abroad and the promotion of university exchanges.

Such ideas had already been put forward in Italy, but without any concrete results. After graduating Corradi pursued research on the right to education at the United Nations and became a scientific consultant for the Association of Rectors of Italian Universities at the age of 30. It was a post she gained in part to her diploma from Columbia, and she used her position to lobby intensively for her idea of a university exchange programme and mutual recognition. She cooperated with well-established rectors Alessandro Faedo and Vincenzo Buonocore to further her ideas.

In 1969, her ideas were outlined at the European Conference of Rectors in Geneva by Alessandro Faedo (in a note written by Corradi), and also put forward in four large Italian newspapers. That same year, she co-led an Italian-German meeting in Ettlingen to discuss mutual recognition of university studies. She later recalled that critics asked her what the point was of sending students to Germany "to chase blonde girls", to which she replied that if someone didn't want to study, they wouldn't take exams anyway. Her note was adopted by the Italian Minister of Education, Mario Ferrari Aggradi, and would form the basis of a legal act adopted years later. It also generated talks between other European countries. Corradi built on the momentum to continue lobbying for her ideas. In 1976, her principles were established at the European level with the approval of the Resolution of 9 February 1976 of the European Economic Community, that encouraged student exchanges between universities in different countries. This resolution allowed the experimentation (which lasted from 1976 to 1986, the decade of the "Joint Study Programs") of that model of "mobility with recognition of credits" which, after various delays and obstacles, would become the Erasmus Programme in 1987. Sofia Corradi was later nicknamed "Mamma Erasmus" or "Mother Erasmus".

Corradi died on 17 October 2025, at the age of 91.

== Research ==
Corradi carried out research at the UN Commission on Human Rights, where she studied the issue of the right to education as a fundamental human right. She has also worked for the Academy of International Law in The Hague, the London School of Economics in London, and for UNESCO in Paris. She taught Lifelong learning at the Faculty of Educational Sciences of the Roma Tre University from 1980 to 2004.

== Honours and awards ==
- 2016 – Charles V European Award. On 9 May, Europe Day, she received the European Charles V Award from King Felipe VI of Spain and the president of the European Parliament Martin Schulz. On that occasion Stefania Giannini, Minister of Education, thanked her "for her extraordinary work. We owe her tenacity for a Program that has completely revolutionized the lives of our children, contributing to the construction of Europe". The ceremony was widely reported in the Italian and European press.
- 2016 – Commander, Order of Merit of the Italian Republic.
- 2016 – Capo Circeo European Award, Press Release Adn KroGos
- 2018 – Grand Cross, Civil Order of King Alfonso X the Wise
- 2018 – Premio Internazionale Anna Lorenzetto
- 2018 – Alcide De Gasperi, Builders of Europe Award, Presidency of the Province of Trento and Bolzano
- 2019 – Bellisario Award
- 2023 – Premio Elena Cornaro
