= Marquess of Oreja =

Hereditary title of Spanish nobility

Marquessate of Oreja
- Creation date: 8 April 2010
- Created by: Juan Carlos I of Spain
- First holder: Marcelino Oreja
- Remainder to: Heirs of the body of the grantee

Marquess of Oreja is a hereditary title of Spanish nobility. It was created on 8 April 2010 by King Juan Carlos I of Spain in favor of Marcelino Oreja, diplomat and politician.

== Marquesses of Oreja (2010) ==
- Marcelino Oreja, 1st Marquess of Oreja (2010–)
