= Marcelino Oreja, 1st Marquess of Oreja =

Spanish lawyer, diplomat and politician

The Most Excellent The Marquess of Oreja
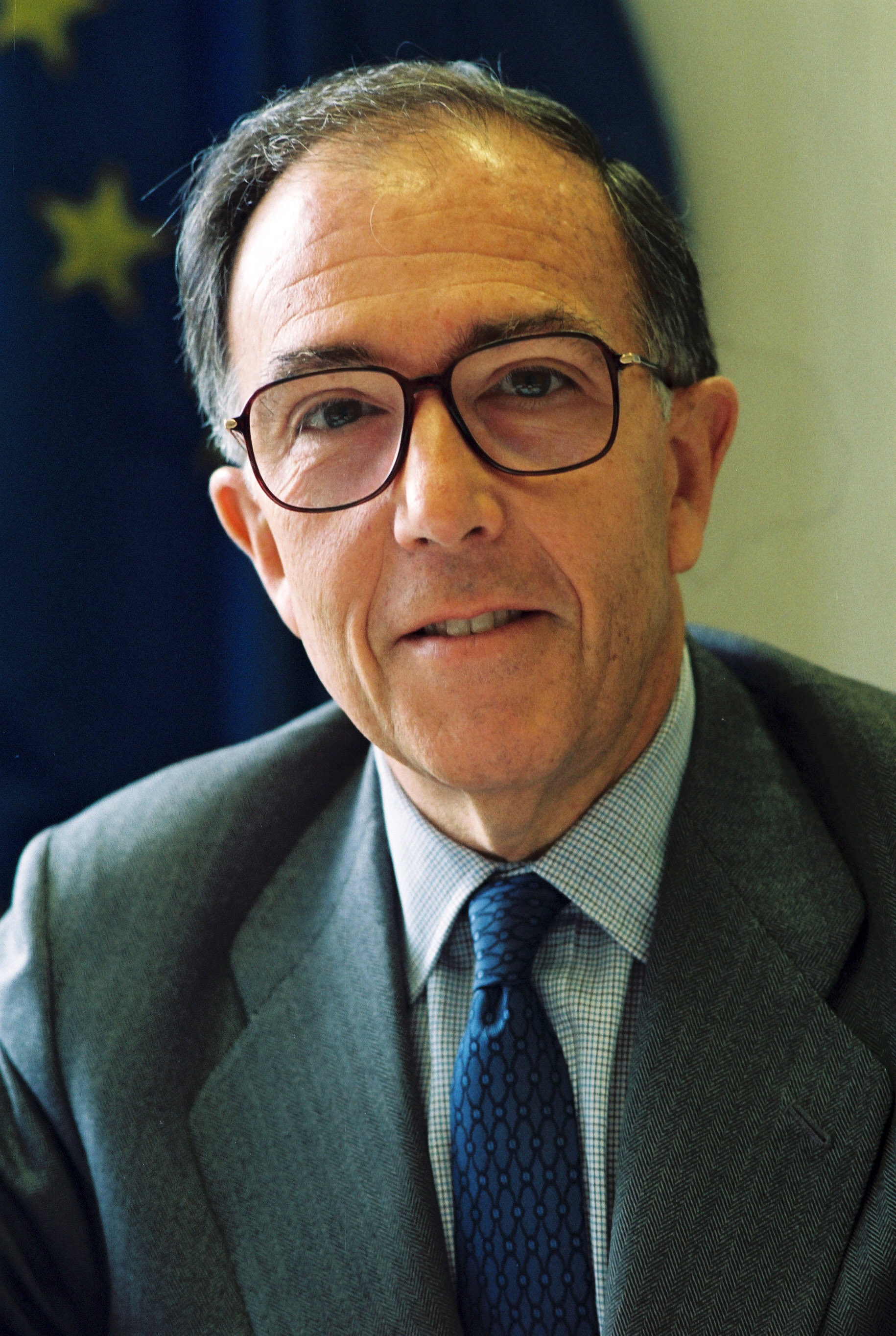
- Official portrait, 1994

European Commissioner for Transport
- In office 1994–1995
- President: Jacques Delors
- Preceded by: Abel Matutes
- Succeeded by: Neil Kinnock

Minister of Foreign Affairs
- In office 7 July 1976 – 8 September 1980
- Prime Minister: Adolfo Suárez
- Preceded by: José María de Areilza, Count of Motrico
- Succeeded by: José Pedro Pérez-Llorca

Secretary General of the Council of Europe
- In office 1 October 1984 – 1 June 1989
- Preceded by: Franz Karasek
- Succeeded by: Catherine Lalumière

Personal details
- Born: 13 February 1935 (age 91) Madrid, Spain
- Party: People's Party
- Other political affiliations: Union of the Democratic Centre
- Parent: Marcelino Oreja Elósegui

Marcelino Oreja Aguirre, 1st Marquess of Oreja (born 13 February 1935) is a Spanish diplomat and politician of the People's Party. He served as Foreign Minister of Spain between 1976 and 1980. Between 1984 and 1989 he was Secretary General of the Council of Europe. In 1989 he became member of the European Parliament and he served until 1993. In 1994 he was appointed European Commissioner for Transport and Energy and then European Commissioner for Institutional Relations and Communication Strategy.

== Career ==
Oreja was born on 13 February 1935 in Madrid, his father was Marcelino Oreja Elósegui.

In May 1973 he and a number of Madrid-based individuals founded the Grupo Tácito, a group of intellectuals, politicians and journalists, some of them coming from the Franco regime and others from the democratic and monarchist opposition to the dictatorship. They - by the prospect of Franco's death - advocated a democratic solution to the dictatorial regime and had influence in different sectors linked to the system, and where active during the period of the Spanish Transition between 1973 and 1976. Oreja came up with the name after the Roman historian Tacitus, meaning that due to government censorship not everything could be said. The Grupo Tácito had its origins in a meeting of the Asociación Católica Nacional de Propagandistas’ (Catholic National Association of Propagandists) and group's early influence was largely determined by its access to the Catholic press.

Oreja served as Spanish minister of foreign affairs from 5 July 1976 to 1980. July 1976 Oreja set out to reform Spain's 1953 Concordat with the Vatican, which resulted the same month in agreements with the Holy See laying out the separation of church and state. The Spanish chief of state no more had the right to nominate Roman Catholic bishops, in exchange the Vatican dropped its right of "ecclesiastical forum". Two months later Oreja signed the Universal Declaration of Human Rights on behalf of Spain.

On 24 November 1977, in Strasbourg, Oreja signed Spain's accession to the Council of Europe, with the European Convention on Human Rights entering into force in Spain on 4 October 1979.

He was Secretary General of the Council of Europe from 1984 to 1989.

He was elected to the European Parliament in 1989. His membership ended on 28 June 1993.

In 1994 Oreja was appointed European Commissioner for Transport and Energy and then European Commissioner for Institutional Relations and Communication Strategy.

At the end of his mandate, Oreja retired from political life, returning to Spain. He continued to be active in many fields, being appointed Head of the Institute for European Studies at the CEU San Pablo University Foundation, Vice-chair of the BBV Foundation (1996) and Doctor Honoris Causa at Zaragoza and Seville Universities (1996).

== Personal life ==
He married Silvia Arburúa, daughter of Minister Manuel Arburúa de la Miyar and has 2 sons: Marcelino and Manuel.

== Other activities ==
- Elcano Royal Institute for International and Strategic Studies, Member of the Board of Trustees
- Spanish Royal Academy of Moral and Political Sciences (RACMP), Member
- Spanish Royal Academy of Jurisprudence and Legislation (RAJL), Member

== Recognition ==
On 8 April 2010 Oreja was made Marquess of Oreja.

Political offices
Preceded by The Count of Motrico	Minister of Foreign Affairs; 7 July 1976 – 8 September 1980	Succeeded by José Pedro Pérez-Llorca
Preceded by Abel Matutes	Spanish European Commissioner; 1994–1999; Served alongside: Manuel Marín	Succeeded by
Spanish nobility
New creation	Marquess of Oreja; 2010–	Succeeded by Incumbent
