= Jacques Camille Paris =

French diplomat (1902–1953)

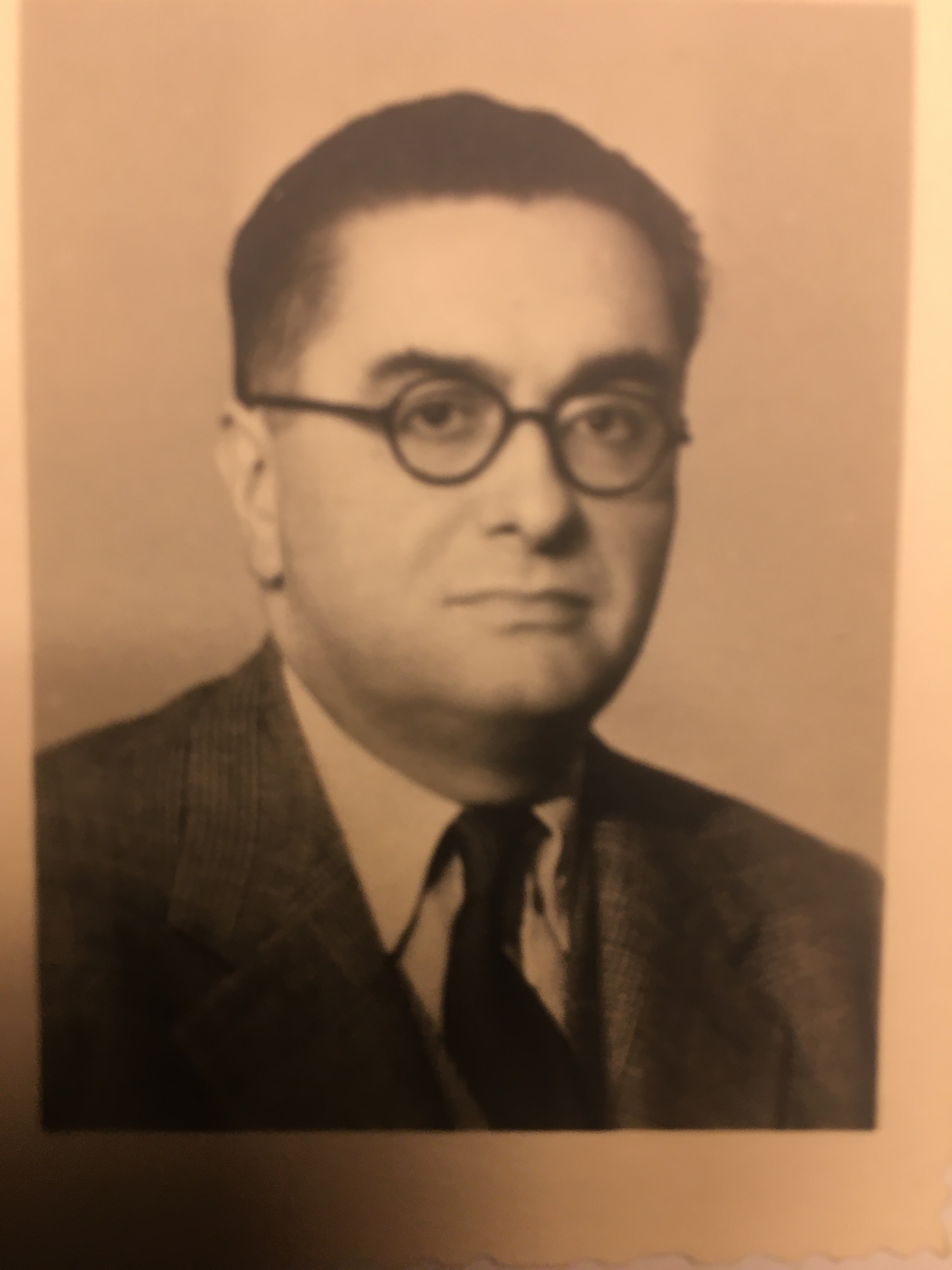
Paris in 1950

Jacques Camille Paris (2 November 1902 – 17 July 1953), was the first Secretary General of the Council of Europe from 11 August 1949 until his death.

During the Second World War he was head of the Commissariat Général aux Affaires Etrangères for the French government in London and Algiers. He was appointed Executive Secretary of the French delegation which drew up the plans for the Council of Europe in 1948 and 1949.

There is a street named after him in Bordeaux.

The Rose Window of Strasbourg Cathedral, donated by the Council of Europe in 1956 and featuring the European flag above the image of the Virgin Mary, is also dedicated to him.

Jacques Paris married Reine Claudel, the daughter of Paul Claudel. When he died in a road accident in Talence in the summer of 1953, the Pope sent Paul Claudel a letter of condolence. His daughter Reine Marie Paris was the biographer of Camille Claudel, her great-aunt.

The choice of a French national as the first Secretary General for the Council of Europe, like the choice of Strasbourg as the seat of the organisation, was the result of a deal between the British and the French. In return, the French accepted the British blueprint of an organisation with limited powers, including a parliamentary assembly that was purely consultative.
