= Erasmus Programme =

European Commission programme for education, training, youth, and sport

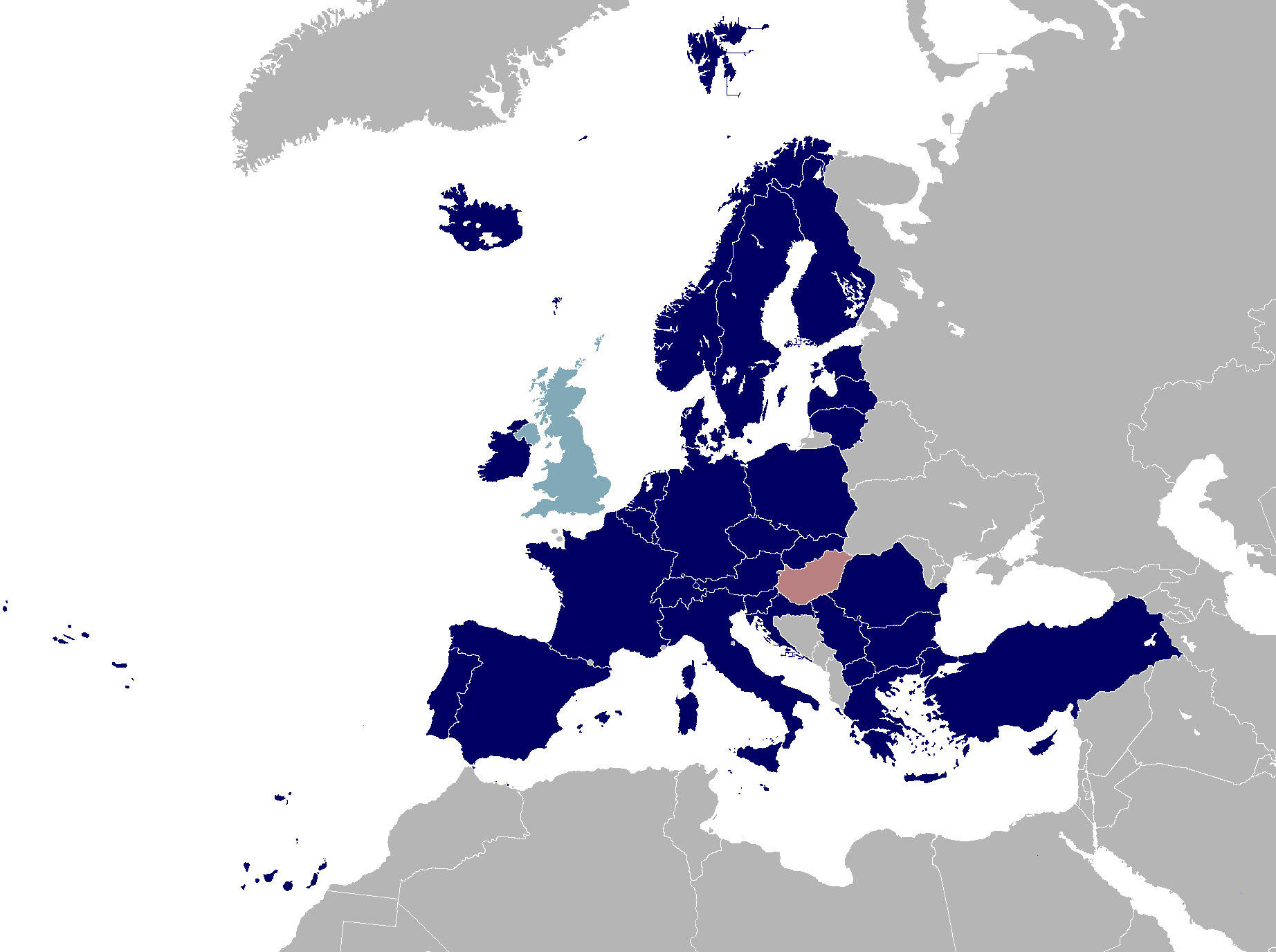
Countries participating in the Erasmus Programme

The Erasmus Programme is an educational programme named after Erasmus, combining all the EU's current schemes for education, training, youth and sport. It was created as the European Community Action Scheme for the Mobility of University Students, a European Union (EU) student exchange programme established in 1987. The original idea for the programme was first developed in the 1960s by Italian pedagogist Sofia Corradi, who advocated for the official recognition of study periods abroad.

== Overview ==
Erasmus+ is the EU's programme to support education, training, youth and sport in Europe. The programme involves the 27 EU Member States and 7 non-EU associated countries (North Macedonia, Serbia, Iceland, Liechtenstein, Norway, Turkey, and the United Kingdom (2027)), with 55 national agencies responsible for the decentralised management of most of the programme's actions. Other countries across the world may also participate in certain parts of the programme. The overall responsibility for the programme's management, direction and evaluation lies with the European Commission (Directorate-General for Education, Youth, Sport and Culture), assisted by its Education, Audio-visual and Culture Executive Agency (EACEA).

The objective of Erasmus+ is to promote transnational learning mobility and cooperation, as a mean of improving quality and excellence, supporting inclusion and equity, and boosting innovation in the fields of education, youth and sport. In all these sectors, the aim is to provide support, through lifelong learning, for the educational, professional and personal development of participants in Europe and beyond.

The programme's objective is pursued through three key actions:

- Key action 1: Learning mobility of individuals
- Key action 2: Cooperation among organisations and institutions
- Key action 3: Support to policy development and cooperation

Other activities include "Jean Monnet" actions, which support teaching, learning, research and debates on European integration matters, e.g. on the EU's future challenges and opportunities.

Full information on the current profile and the activities for which funding within the programme is available can be found in the Erasmus+ Programme Guide.

Launched in 1987, the Erasmus programme was originally established to promote closer cooperation between universities and higher education institutions across Europe. Over time, the programme has expanded and is now referred to as Erasmus+, or Erasmus Plus, combining the EU's different schemes for transnational cooperation and mobility in education, training, youth and sport in Europe and beyond. The Erasmus+ programme concluded its first funding cycle from 2014 to 2020 and is now in its second cycle, spanning from 2021 to 2027. Noted for its participation among staff, students, young people, and learners across age groups, as of 2021, the programme had engaged over 13 million participants. Its name refers to Erasmus of Rotterdam, a leading scholar and inspiring lecturer during the Renaissance period who travelled extensively in Europe to teach and study at a number of universities. At the same time, the word "Erasmus" is also an acronym for "European Community Action Scheme for the Mobility of University Students".

In 1989, the Erasmus Bureau invited 32 former Erasmus students for an evaluation meeting in Ghent, Belgium. The lack of peer-to-peer support was singled out as a major issue, but it was also a driving force behind the creation of the Erasmus Student Network. The organization supports students from the Erasmus programme and other bilateral agreements and cooperates with national agencies in order to help international students. As of 23 July 2020, the Erasmus Student Network consists of 534 local associations ("sections") in 42 countries and has more than 15,000 volunteers across Europe.

As of 2014, 27 years after its creation, the programme had promoted the mobility of more than 3.3 million students within the European community. More than 5,000 higher education institutions from 38 countries are participating in the project.

The Erasmus Programme, along with several other independent programmes, was incorporated into the Socrates programme established by the European Commission in 1994. The Socrates programme ended on 31 December 1999 and was replaced with the Socrates II programme on 24 January 2000, which in turn was replaced by the Lifelong Learning Programme 2007–2013 on 1 January 2007.

Beside the more popular student mobility (SMS), the Erasmus+ programme promotes the teacher mobility (STA), by which university teachers can spend a short period, for a minimum of 2 teaching days and a maximum of 2 months, teaching at least 8 hours in a foreign partner university. The average and suggested stay is of 5 teaching days.

== Background and history ==
=== Origins of the name ===
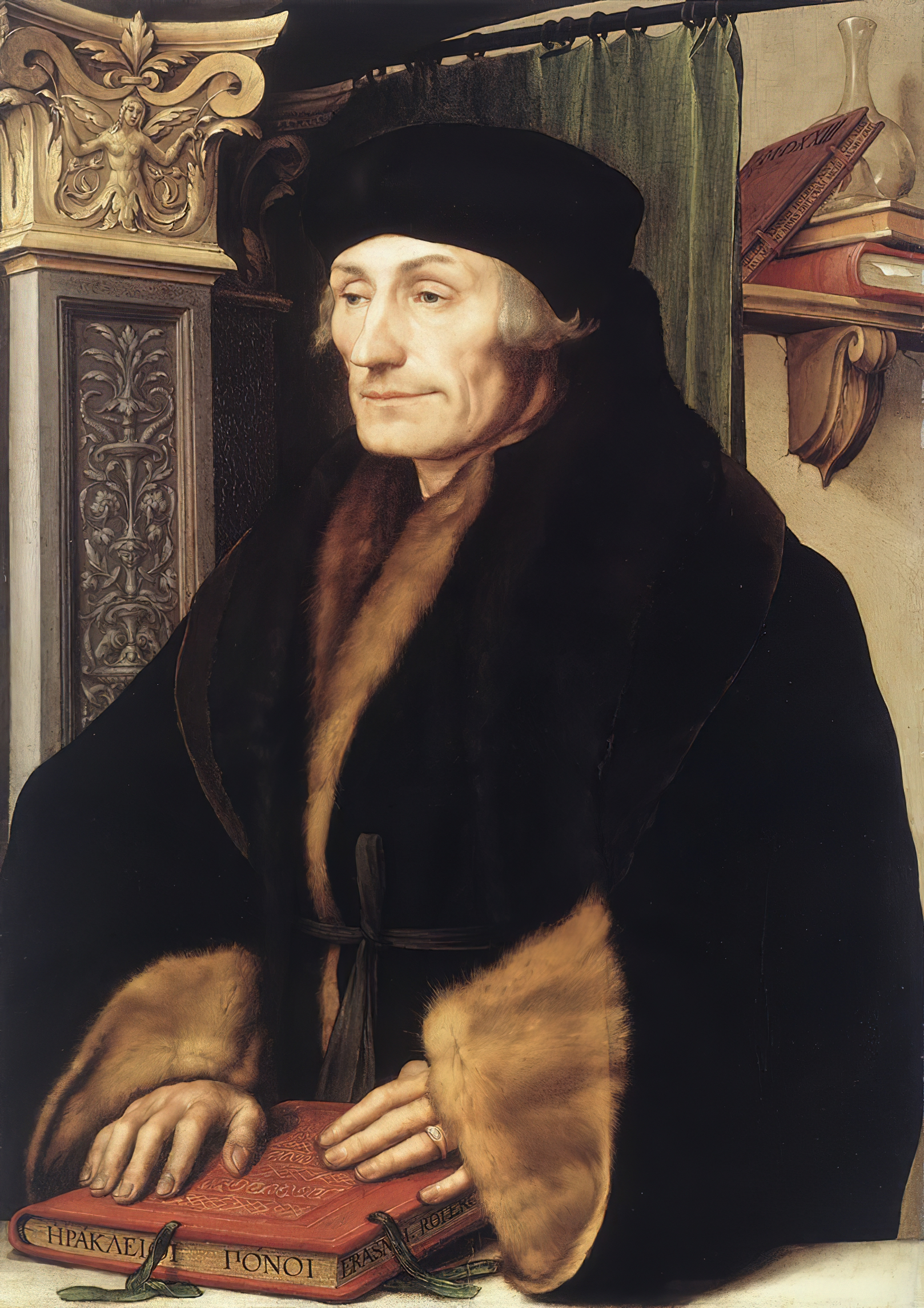
Desiderius Erasmus of Rotterdam

The programme is named after the Dutch philosopher, theologian, Renaissance humanist, monk, and devout Roman Catholic, Desiderius Erasmus of Rotterdam, called "the crowning glory of the Christian humanists". Erasmus, along with his good friend Thomas More, became one of the main figures of European intellectual life during the Renaissance. Known for his satire, Erasmus urged internal reform of the Catholic Church. He encouraged a recovery of the Catholic Patristic tradition against what he considered to be contemporary abuses of the sacraments and certain excessive devotional practices. He famously clashed with Protestant revolutionary Martin Luther on the subject of free will. ERASMUS is a backronym meaning European Community Action Scheme for the Mobility of University Students. Erasmus travelled widely across Europe and he was a pioneer of the European Republic of Letters. He was one of the first intellectuals to use as a vehicle of diffusion of his ideas a path-breaking technology, namely the movable type and spent a lot of his time inside printing workshops.

The programme's origins can be traced through a series of significant events documented on the official European Commission programme page:

- From 1973 to 1976, the first European-level education action programme was established.
- Between 1976 and 1987, the foundations for what would later become Erasmus were laid through the "Joint Study Programme" (JSP) scheme in higher education. The organisation and execution of the JSP was entrusted to the European Cultural Foundation. This initiative gained traction as more universities and students participated, contributing to the development of mobility, partnership, and joint curricula.
- From 1985 to 1987, the "Erasmus" proposal was developed and negotiated. In 1985, the Directorate for Education and Training presented the proposal to the Council and European Parliament. The Council officially adopted the "Erasmus" programme on June 15, 1987, and it was officially launched on July 1, 1987. The responsibility for the central operations office of the programme was in the hands of the European Cultural Foundation until 1995.

Italian educator and pedagogist Sofia Corradi is credited as the originator of the Erasmus Programme. In 1958, after completing a Master's degree in comparative university law at Columbia University with a Fulbright scholarship, Corradi returned to Italy to find that her American academic credits were not recognized by La Sapienza University, forcing her to repeat coursework. This experience led her to advocate for a European system of student mobility with mutual recognition of academic credits. Beginning in 1969, Corradi worked as a scientific consultant to the permanent conference of Italian university rectors (Conferenza dei Rettori delle Università Italiane). From this position, she promoted her proposals at the European Conference of Rectors in Geneva in 1969, presenting a note delivered by rector Alessandro Faedo. Her advocacy contributed to the adoption of the Resolution of 9 February 1976 by the European Economic Community, which established the framework for student exchanges and Joint Study Programs that operated from 1976 to 1986. The programme gained political momentum in 1986–1987 when the EGEE student association (now AEGEE), founded by Franck Biancheri, convinced French President François Mitterrand to support the creation of the Erasmus Programme.

This active collaboration between AEGEE and the European Commission and especially Domenico Lenarduzzi, Ministry of Public Education, allowed the approval of the Erasmus programme in 1987. It became an integral part of the Socrates I (1994–1999) and Socrates II (2000–2006) programmes. From 2007 it became one of the elements of the Lifelong Learning Programme (2007–2013).

In June 1984, the European Council decided in Fontainebleau to establish an ad-hoc European citizens' committee with the mission to make proposals to improve the image of the European Union. Each council member would select a member and together they should present a set of proposals to be approved at a future European Council. Under the chairmanship of Pietro Adonnino, the committee presented two successive reports that were approved at the Council session in Milan on the 28–29 of June 1985. Under the proposals that were advanced in these reports was the suggestion (to be found in the second report from number 5.6: University Cooperation) that the ministers for education and universities and higher-education establishments

1. should establish a cross-frontier cooperation enabling students to pursue part of their studies in an establishment in a member state other than their own;
2. should implement, a comprehensive European inter-university programme of exchanges and studies aimed at giving this opportunity to a significant section of the EU's student population.

These suggestions were advanced by the Belgian member Prosper Thuysbaert and were discussed and approved by the committee.

=== 1987 European Commission proposal ===
By the time the Erasmus Programme was adopted in June 1987, the European Commission had been supporting pilot student exchanges for six years. It proposed the original Erasmus Programme in early 1986, but reaction from the then member states varied: those with substantial exchange programmes of their own (essentially France, Germany and the United Kingdom) were broadly hostile; the remaining countries were broadly in favour. Exchanges between the member states and the European Commission deteriorated, and the latter withdrew the proposal in early 1987 to protest against the inadequacy of the triennial budget proposed by some member states.

=== European Court of Justice decision ===
This method of voting, a simple majority, was not accepted by some of the opposing member states, who challenged the adoption of the decision before the European Court of Justice. Although the court held that the adoption was procedurally flawed, it maintained the substance of the decision; a further decision, adapted in the light of the jurisprudence, was rapidly adopted by the Council of Ministers.

=== Adoption and growth ===
The programme built on the 1981–1986 pilot student exchanges, and although it was formally adopted only shortly before the beginning of the academic year 1987–1988, it was still possible for 3,244 students to participate in Erasmus in its first year. In 2006, over 150,000 students, or almost 1% of the European student population, took part. The proportion is higher among university teachers, where Erasmus teacher mobility is 1.9% of the teacher population in Europe, or 20,877 people.

From 1987 to 2006, over two million students benefited from Erasmus grants. In 2004, the Erasmus Programme was awarded the Princess of Asturias Award for International Cooperation.

=== Lifelong Learning Programme 2007–2013 ===
After 2007, the Lifelong Learning Programme 2007–2013 replaced the Socrates programme as the overall umbrella under which the Erasmus (and other) programmes operated.

=== Erasmus Mundus ===
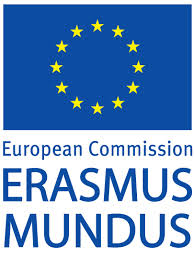
Erasmus Mundus

The Erasmus Mundus programme is a parallel scholarship programme oriented towards globalising European education and is open to non-Europeans with Europeans being exceptional cases.

=== Citizens' initiative for more money 2014–2020 ===
In May 2012, Fraternité 2020 was registered as Europe's first European Citizens' Initiative and a goal to increase the budget for EU exchange programmes like Erasmus or the European Voluntary Service starting in 2014. It ultimately collected only 71,057 signatures from citizens across the EU out of 1 million signatures needed by 1 November 2013.

=== Erasmus+ Programme 2014–2020 ===
Erasmus+, also called Erasmus Plus, has been the new 14.7 billion euro catch-all framework programme for education, training, youth and sport from 2014 to 2020. The Erasmus+ programme combined all the EU's schemes for education, training, youth and sport, including the Lifelong Learning Programme (Erasmus, Leonardo da Vinci, Comenius, Grundtvig), Youth in Action and five international co-operation programmes (Erasmus Mundus, Tempus, Alfa, Edulink and the programme for co-operation with industrialised countries). The Erasmus+ regulation was signed on 11 December 2013.

Erasmus+ provided grants for a wide range of actions including the opportunity for students to undertake work placements abroad and for teachers and education staff to attend training courses. Projects are divided into two parts – formal and non-formal education – each of them with three key actions. Erasmus+ key action one provides an opportunity for teachers, headmasters, trainers and other staff of education institutions to participate in international training courses in different European countries.

The staff home institution must apply to receive the grant to send its staff members abroad for training.

Some parts of Erasmus+ are also open to activities in countries beyond the EU. As an example, in Central Asia's Kazakhstan, 40 projects were supported involving 47 Kazakh universities with more than 35.5 million euros.

With Brexit, the UK government decision not to participate in Erasmus+ meant UK students (9,993 in 2018) lost access to the Erasmus programme and EU students (29,797 in 2018) lost access to UK universities, despite some Conservatives such as Suella Braverman having benefitted from it and promises made by then-Prime Minister Boris Johnson that "There is no threat to the ERASMUS scheme." The UK opted not to take part as an associated third country in the new Erasmus+ programme. The UK decided to utilise the funds that would have been paid into Erasmus+ to create the Turing scheme, allowing 40,000 students p.a., from age 4 to university age, to gain experience overseas, without being limited to European destinations.

=== Erasmus+ Programme 2021–Present ===
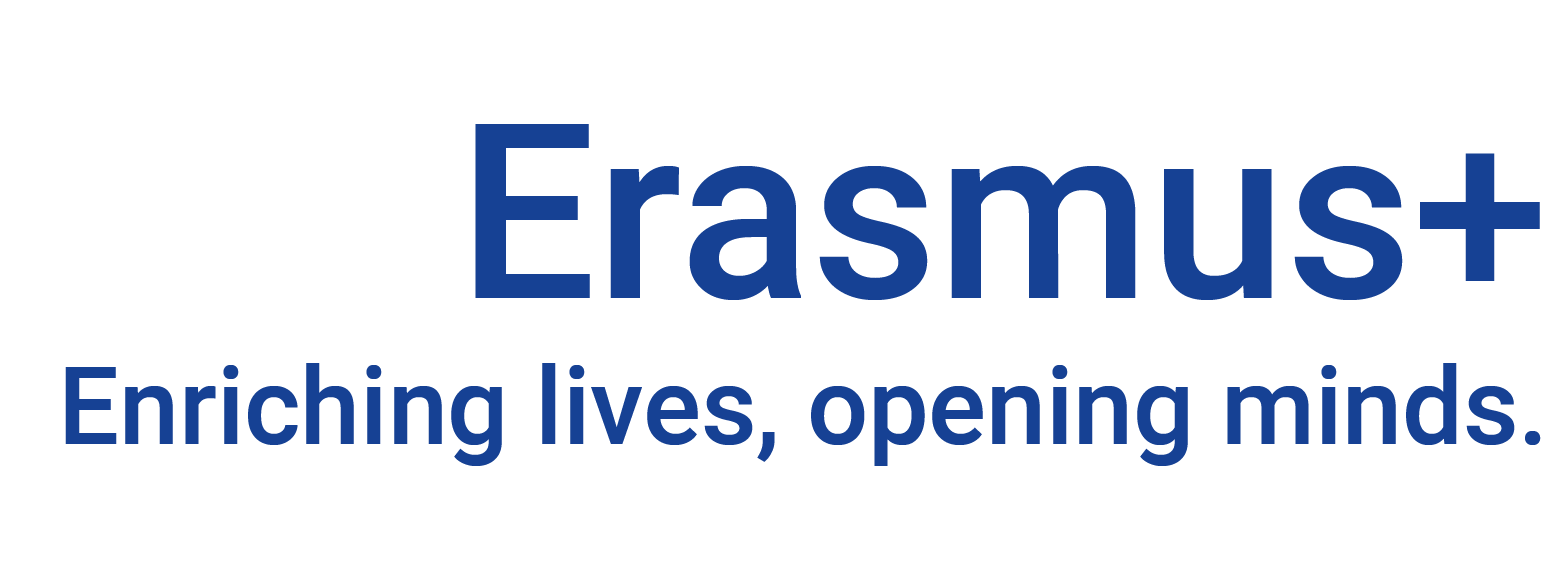
Logo of the current Erasmus+ programme (2021–2027)

On 30 May 2018, the European Commission adopted its proposal for the next Erasmus programme, with a doubling of the budget to 30 billion euros for the period 2021–2027. Further negotiations were expected to take place during the 2019–2024 European parliamentary term with the European Parliament and the European Council before the final programme is adopted. The agreement between the European Parliament and the European Council was adopted and the publication of the new regulation 2021/817 establishing the new Erasmus+ programme was made on 28 May 2021.

For the second phase of the programme, the EU has made the commitment to expand Erasmus+ further and to enrich it by introducing a new 'greening' dimension as well as a strong new digital education component. The new greening dimension is designed to contribute to combating climate change and addressing other global challenges including health, while the digital education strand seeks in particular to improve the quality of online education in Europe which has grown considerably in the aftermath of the COVID-19 pandemic. Further transversal priorities for the programme are the commitment to social inclusion and diversity, and to promoting stronger participation in democratic life, common values and civic engagement.

In December 2025, the UK government announced it would aim to secure a deal to rejoin Erasmus+, a government spokesperson stating, "At the summit in May, we agreed to work towards association to Erasmus+, ensuring it is on the right terms for the UK.".

== Participation and impact of the programme ==
Nearly 14 million people have participated in the Erasmus programme since its creation. The young participants has increased significantly since 1987. Nearly 300,000 a year compared with only 3,244 in 1987. Spain is the country that has allowed most people to participate in Erasmus with more than 40,000 per year, slightly ahead of France, Germany and Italy. The countries receiving the most Erasmus students are Spain with more than 47,000 students and Germany with 32,800. Erasmus has positively impacted higher education, bringing educational, social, cultural, and economic benefits to institutions. It professionalizes international cooperation, strengthens academic ties, fosters research collaborations, and forms informal networks, creating friendships across borders. The programme has become a valued source of 'soft power' and diplomatic value for participating countries. There are currently more than 4,000 higher institutions participating in Erasmus across the 37 countries. In 2012–13, 270,000 took part, the most popular destinations being Spain, Germany, Italy and France. Erasmus students represented 5 percent of European graduates as of 2012. EU Member States and third countries associated to the Programme can fully take part in all the Actions of Erasmus+. The third countries associated to the Programme are North Macedonia, Serbia, Iceland, Liechtenstein, Norway and Turkey. In the EU-UK summit on 19 May 2025, the UK and the European Commission agreed to work towards the association of the UK with the Erasmus+ programme.

Studies have discussed issues related to the selection into the programme and the representativeness of the participants. Some studies have raised doubts about the inclusiveness of the programme, by socio-economic background, level of study, or academic performance. Thus, one study analyses the financial issues and family background of Erasmus students, showing that despite the fact that access to the programme has been moderately widened, there are still important socio-economic barriers to participation in the programme. Another study uncovered what seems to be an adverse self-selection of Erasmus students based on their prior academic performance, with higher-performing students less likely to participate than lower-performing ones. However, this case was based on four hundred graduates in only a Spanish university. Inversely, one study looking in details at French and Italian students found that the primary predictor of participation to Erasmus was students' prior academic records, not the occupation of their parents.

=== Requirements ===
The Erasmus Programme had previously been restricted to applicants who had completed at least one year of tertiary-level study, but it is now also available to secondary school students. Indeed, non-formal education programmes for adults, can expand opportunities for its students and staff through the development of international partnerships following the priorities of the Programme, such as inclusion and diversity, digital transformation, environment and climate change or participation in democratic life.

=== Details ===
Students who join the Erasmus Programme study at least three months or do an internship for a period of at least 2 months to an academic year in another European country. The former case is called a Student Mobility for Studies or SMS, while the latter case is called a Student Mobility of Placement or SMP. The Erasmus Programme guarantees that the period spent abroad is recognised by their university when they come back, as long as they abide by terms previously agreed. Switzerland has been suspended as a participant in the Erasmus programme as of 2015, following the popular vote to limit the immigration of EU citizens into Switzerland. As a consequence, Swiss students will not be able to apply for the programme and European students will not be able to spend time at a Swiss university under that programme.

A main part of the programme is that students do not pay extra tuition fees to the university that they visit. Students can also apply for an Erasmus grant to help cover the additional expense of living abroad. Students with disabilities can apply for an additional grant to cover extraordinary expenses.

To reduce expenses and increase mobility, many students also use the European Commission-supported accommodation network, CasaSwap, FlatClub, Erasmusinn, Eurasmus, Erasmate or Student Mundial, which are free websites where students and young people can rent, sublet, offer and swap accommodation – on a national and international basis. A derived benefit is that students can share knowledge and exchange tips and hints with each other before and after going abroad.

=== Impact ===
Erasmus has positively impacted higher education, bringing educational, social, cultural, and economic benefits to institutions. It professionalises international cooperation, strengthens academic ties, fosters research collaborations, and forms informal networks, creating friendships across borders. The programme has become a valued source of 'soft power' and diplomatic value for participating countries.

External evaluations and a multitude of personal stories abound from successive generations of participants to confirm the extent to which their "Erasmus experience" provided them not only with enhanced knowledge and competence in their respective fields, but also with a transformative, life-enhancing dimension both in personal terms and for their careers. This is true of all parts of the programme forming the present Erasmus+, though most data is available for higher education.

== Erasmus in the media and popular culture ==
=== The "Erasmus experience" ===
For many higher education students, the Erasmus Programme is their first time living and studying in another country. Alongside academic study or practical training, the programme fosters learning and understanding of the host country, and the Erasmus experience is considered both a time for learning as well as a chance to socialize and experience a different culture, not to mention self-discovery. In this respect, and thanks to its popularity among students, it has emerged as a contemporary cultural phenomenon, inspiring books and films that explore the Erasmus experience.

=== Films ===
Most of the characters in the French-Spanish film L'Auberge espagnole (2002) are enrolled in the programme, which plays a central role in the film.

Various documentary films have been produced around the programme, notably the Italian documentary Erasmus 24 7 or Erasmus, notre plus belle année (2017).

=== Books ===
The self-finding experiences of Erasmus students in France form the basis for Davide Faraldi's first novel Generazione Erasmus (2008).

In David Mitchell's 2015 novel Slade House, an Erasmus party is the scene for an important experience for fresher student Sally Timms.

Pakistani novelist Nimra Ahmed's novel Jannat K Patte (Leaves of Heaven) is based on the Erasmus programme, where the protagonist Haya goes to Sabancı University in Turkey through Erasmus Mundus, which marks a turning point in her life.

In the novel Normal People (2018) written by Irish author Sally Rooney and its subsequent adaptation for television, Marianne goes to Sweden via the Erasmus programme.

=== Cafébabel ===
The online public forum Cafébabel was founded in 2001 by Erasmus exchange programme students, and is headquartered in Paris. The forum is based on the principle of participatory journalism. As of June 2020 it had over 15,000 contributors as well as a team of professional editors and journalists in Paris, Brussels, Rome, Madrid and Berlin. Volunteer contributors simultaneously translate the forum into six languages – French, English, German, Italian, Spanish and Polish.

== The Erasmus generation ==
Some academics have speculated that former Erasmus students will prove to be a powerful force in creating a pan-European identity. In 2005, the political scientist Stefan Wolff, for example, argued that "Give it 15, 20 or 25 years, and Europe will be run by leaders with a completely different socialisation from those of today", referring to the so-called 'Erasmus generation'. This term describes young Europeans who participate in Erasmus programme and are assumed to support European integration more actively when compared with their elder generations. The assumption is that young Europeans, who enjoyed the benefits of European integration, think of themselves as European citizens, and therefore create a base of support for further European integration. However, questions are raised about whether there is positive correlation between the programme and pro-European integration.

According to the former European Commissioner for Education, Culture, Youth and Sport, Tibor Navracsics, Erasmus programme is a soft power tool and it reflects the political motivation behind its creation, including the task of legitimising the European institutions. This conception has already been presented in the project of Sofia Corradi, an Italian educationalist who, from the 1960s onwards, promoted the idea of cross-border student mobility and played an important role in raising awareness about the academic benefits of transnational exchanges of the Erasmus Programme. She gives a particular attention to the need to activate an exchange between young people from all over Europe to contribute to the strengthening of its unity and integrity.

One issue discussed is whether participation in the Erasmus program helps generate more European solidarity. A study carried out by the European Commission in 2010, shows that participating to Erasmus strengthens tolerance. Another issue is whether Erasmus enables the mixing of Europeans. For example, more than a quarter of Erasmus participants meet their life partner through it and participation in Erasmus encourages mobility between European countries. Umberto Eco called it sexual integration. The European Commission estimates that the program has resulted directly in the births of over 1 million children, sometimes called "Erasmus Babies".

As to whether Erasmus fosters a sense of European identity the results are mixed. Some research indicates that those participating in Erasmus exchanges are already significantly predisposed to be pro-European, leading some scholars to conclude that such exchange programmes are 'preaching to the converted'. However, more recent research has criticised the earlier findings for being methodically flawed, relying primarily on the experience of British students and for using relatively small samples. Relying on a larger scale survey conducted on some 1700 students in six countries, Mitchell found that 'participation in an Erasmus exchange is significantly and positively related to changes in both identification as European and identification with Europe'. In addition, it has also been submitted that the earlier literature confused cause and effect, since the existence of such programmes constitutes a tangible benefit provided by the EU to prospective students interested in going abroad, which may cause them to view the EU positively even prior to participation.

=== Digital support for student mobility ===
In addition to traditional administrative procedures, digital infrastructures have been developed to support the secure transfer and recognition of academic records within Erasmus+ mobility. One such system is EMREX (European Mobility Exchange), which allows students to electronically transmit verified course and examination results between universities across borders. EMREX is particularly used in Nordic countries, where it is integrated into national higher education information systems. Reports on interoperability and student mobility cite the system as a practical measure to simplify administrative processes and reduce reliance on paper-based documentation.

== See also ==
- Academic mobility
- Comenius programme
- Swiss-European Mobility Programme
- Erasmus Student Network (ESN) – non-profit European students organisation
- Association des États Généraux des Étudiants de l'Europe (AEGEE) – non-profit European students organisation
- European Students' Union (ESU) – non-profit European students organisation
- European Medical Students' Association (EMSA) – non-profit European medical students organisation
- European Students of Industrial Engineering and Management (ESTIEM) – non-profit European students organisation
- European Credit Transfer and Accumulation System (ECTS)
- European Higher Education Area
- Socrates Network for Translator Training
- University Mobility in Asia and the Pacific
- Student exchange programme
- Public diplomacy
- Enhancing Student Mobility through Online Support
- Turing scheme
