= Walter Schwimmer =

Austrian politician and diplomat (1942–2025)

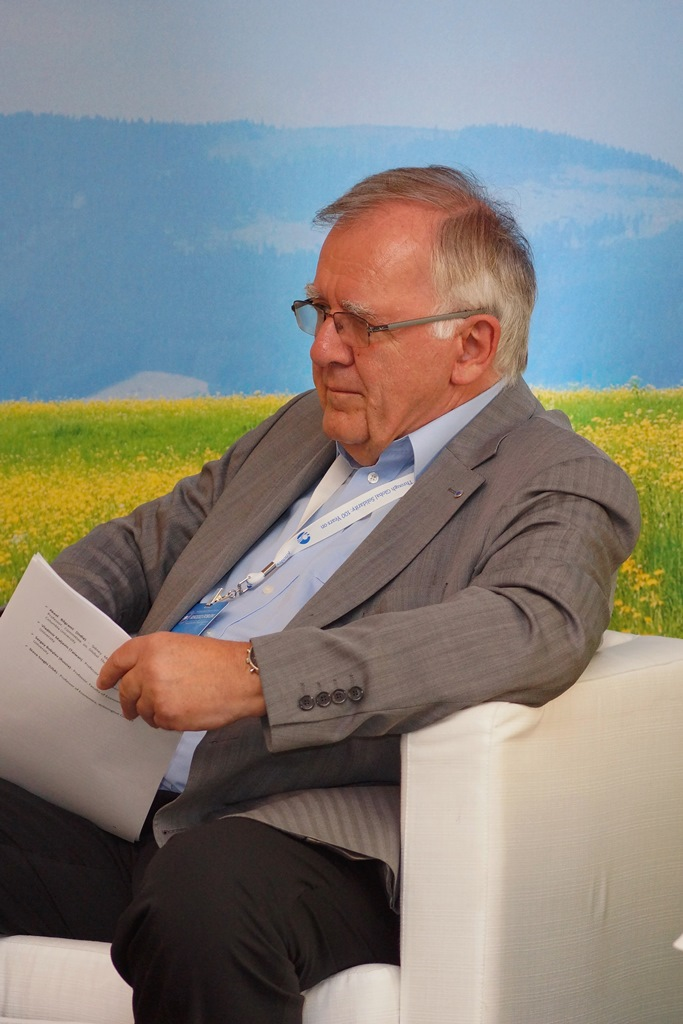
Schwimmer in 2014

Walter Schwimmer (16 June 1942 – 12 March 2025) was an Austrian politician and diplomat. He was the Secretary General of the Council of Europe from 1 September 1999 to 31 August 2004.

== Life and career ==
After being a member of the Austrian Parliament (National Council) for 28 years, serving as chairperson of several committees (Justice, Health, Housing and Construction) and deputy leader of his political group (ÖVP – Austrian People's Party), Schwimmer was elected Secretary General of the Council of Europe.

He held this post from 1 September 1999 until 31 August 2004. At the beginning of his term, The Economist accused him of being a "timid moral policeman" over his treatment of the Chechen–Russian conflict. In June 2004 his attempt to be elected to a second five-year term as secretary general failed, like all his predecessors of whom no one was reelected.

Shortly before his death, Schwimmer worked as a consultant on international relations and European affairs, based in Klosterneuburg near Vienna.

He was (honorary) Secretary General of the Maison de la Méditerranée/Fondazione Mediterraneo (Naples) and Chairman of the International Coordination Committee of the World Public Forum - Dialogue of Civilisations, a Russian vehicle.

On 15 April 2010, he became president of Megatrend University, the largest private university in Serbia. He resigned from this position in January 2013.

Schwimmer died on 12 March 2025, at the age of 82.

== Political views ==
In a 2015 with Russia Direct Schwimmer emphasized that the Euromaidan "was originally a civil society movement against corruption and had nothing to do with pro-European or anti-Russian choice. However, it was seen by Russia as a coup d'état and by the EU as a kind of strategic decision of Ukraine to go not with Russia but with Europe, which Schwimmer dismissed as a "misinterpretation" and "nonsense." In the same interview he blames poor European communication for the Russian military getting "concerned about the possibility of losing the naval base in Sevastopol." Not giving Russia a guarantee to keep the naval base in Sevastopol was a mistake, according to Schwimmer: "now Russia and the EU are trapped. Russia will not retreat from Crimea and the EU cannot acknowledge its annexation, since it was against international law. And now Russia and the EU are trapped in this escalation of sanctions that are leading to nothing."

== Honours and awards ==
=== National honours ===
- Austria: Grand Decoration of Honour in Gold with Sash for Services to the Republic of Austria (2005)

=== Foreign honours ===
- France: Chevalier of the French Legion of Honour
- Mexico: Order of the Aztec Eagle (Águila Azteca)
- Romania: Grand Cross of the Order of the Star of Romania

== Bibliography ==
- "The European Dream", Continuum Publishing, London 2004 (translated from the German "Der Traum Europa, Springer-Verlag 2003, also available in Russian, Italian and Serbian).

Political offices
| Preceded by Daniel Tarschys | Secretary General of the Council of Europe; 1 September 1999 - 31 August 2004 | Succeeded by Terry Davis |
