= Eurasmus =

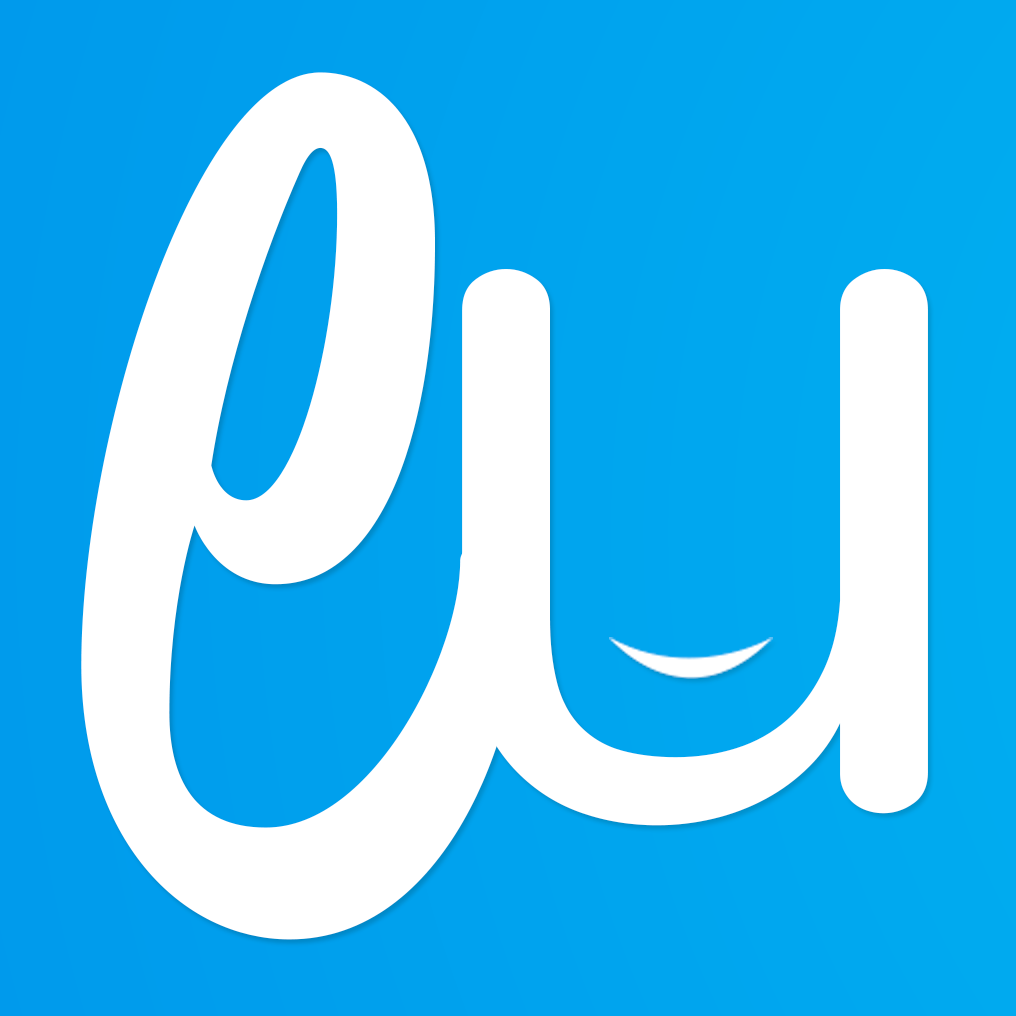
- Company type: Private limited company
- Industry: Accommodation, internships and student guides
- Founded: 2014
- Defunct: 2018
- Headquarters: Seville, Spain
- Area served: Europe
- Products: Student Services

Eurasmus was a website founded in 2014 that offered accommodation, internships and unique city guides online. It offered a system in which exchange students could view many vacancies and easily apply to them or find accommodation and book it online using a secure payment system, what allows the students to have a room or apartment before they arrive in their Erasmus destination.

== History ==
Eurasmus was founded in 2014 and was based in Seville, Spain. The company received funding from the European Regional Development Fund scheme, allowing it to expand across Europe. The company had the aim to integrate by the end of 2015 a free internship portal for students looking to find internships, work placements and even jobs across Europe.
