= Swiss-European Mobility Programme =

The Swiss-European Mobility Programme (SEMP) is Switzerland’s national student and staff mobility scheme that functions as an alternative to the European Union’s Erasmus+ programme. It enables mobility between Swiss higher education institutions and those in Erasmus+ programme countries. SEMP was introduced in response to Switzerland's suspension from Erasmus+ following a political decision in 2014.

== Background ==
Switzerland had participated in the Erasmus programme since 1992 and was fully integrated into Erasmus+ until 2014. However, after the Swiss vote on February 9, 2014, to introduce quotas on immigration from the EU, negotiations to renew Switzerland’s association with Erasmus+ were suspended. Consequently, the European Commission temporarily excluded Switzerland from full participation in Erasmus+.

In response, the Swiss government launched the Swiss-European Mobility Programme (SEMP) in 2014 to ensure continuity in student and academic staff mobility between Switzerland and European countries. It has since been managed and funded by the State Secretariat for Education, Research and Innovation (SERI).

== Structure ==
SEMP supports the mobility of Bachelor, Master, and PhD students, as well as teaching and administrative staff. It covers study exchanges, internships, and teaching assignments at higher education institutions. The programme offers financial grants to both incoming and outgoing participants to support living costs and travel.

Mobility periods can range from two months to one year. The scheme is open to public and private institutions recognized by the Swiss higher education system and cooperating institutions in Erasmus+ programme countries.

== Administration ==
SEMP is funded by the Swiss government through SERI. The programme is administered by national agencies in collaboration with higher education institutions.

Grants vary depending on the destination country and duration of stay. Administrative procedures are streamlined and follow similar principles to those of Erasmus+, including Learning Agreements, recognition of credits (ECTS), and quality assurance measures.

== Impact ==
Since its inception, SEMP has successfully maintained high levels of international mobility for Swiss institutions. Between 2014 and 2020, more than 40,000 mobilities were supported through the programme.

Although not officially part of Erasmus+, SEMP allows Swiss universities to remain closely connected to the European Higher Education Area (EHEA). There is continued advocacy from Swiss academic institutions and student organizations for the full re-association of Switzerland to Erasmus+.

== See also ==
- Erasmus Programme
- State Secretariat for Education, Research and Innovation (Switzerland)
- European Higher Education Area
- Bologna Process
