= Enhancing Student Mobility through Online Support =

European-funded international educational collaboration

ESMOS logo

The Enhancing Student Mobility through Online Support (ESMOS) project is a European-funded partnership between higher education institutions from Austria, Bulgaria, Italy, Lithuania and the United Kingdom. It has the aims of developing, evaluating and modelling the use of Virtual Learning Environments and online technologies to support students who take part in either a study exchange (ERASMUS) or work placement programme (LEONARDO), spending part of their studies overseas.

ESMOS has generated interesting and relevant research and practice results from the implementation (Case Studies) of the Methodology, IT Support Model and Guidelines for the Online Support of International Mobility Students. These results have been disseminated widely through journal papers, conference papers, presentations, workshops, training sessions, promotional leaflets and media coverage.

The two-year project is funded by the SOCRATES Programme/Minerva Action, which seeks to promote European co-operation in the field of Information and Communication Technology (ICT) and Open and Distance Learning (ODL) in education.

== Project partners ==
- University of Salford, United Kingdom
- University of Calabria, Italy
- FH Joanneum Graz, Austria
- Vytautas Magnus University, Lithuania
- Częstochowa University of Technology, Poland
- D. A. Tsenov Academy of Economics, Bulgaria

== See also ==
- Bologna Process
- Erasmus programme
- Directorate-General for Education and Culture
