= Catherine Lalumière =

French politician of the Radical Party of the Left (born 1935)

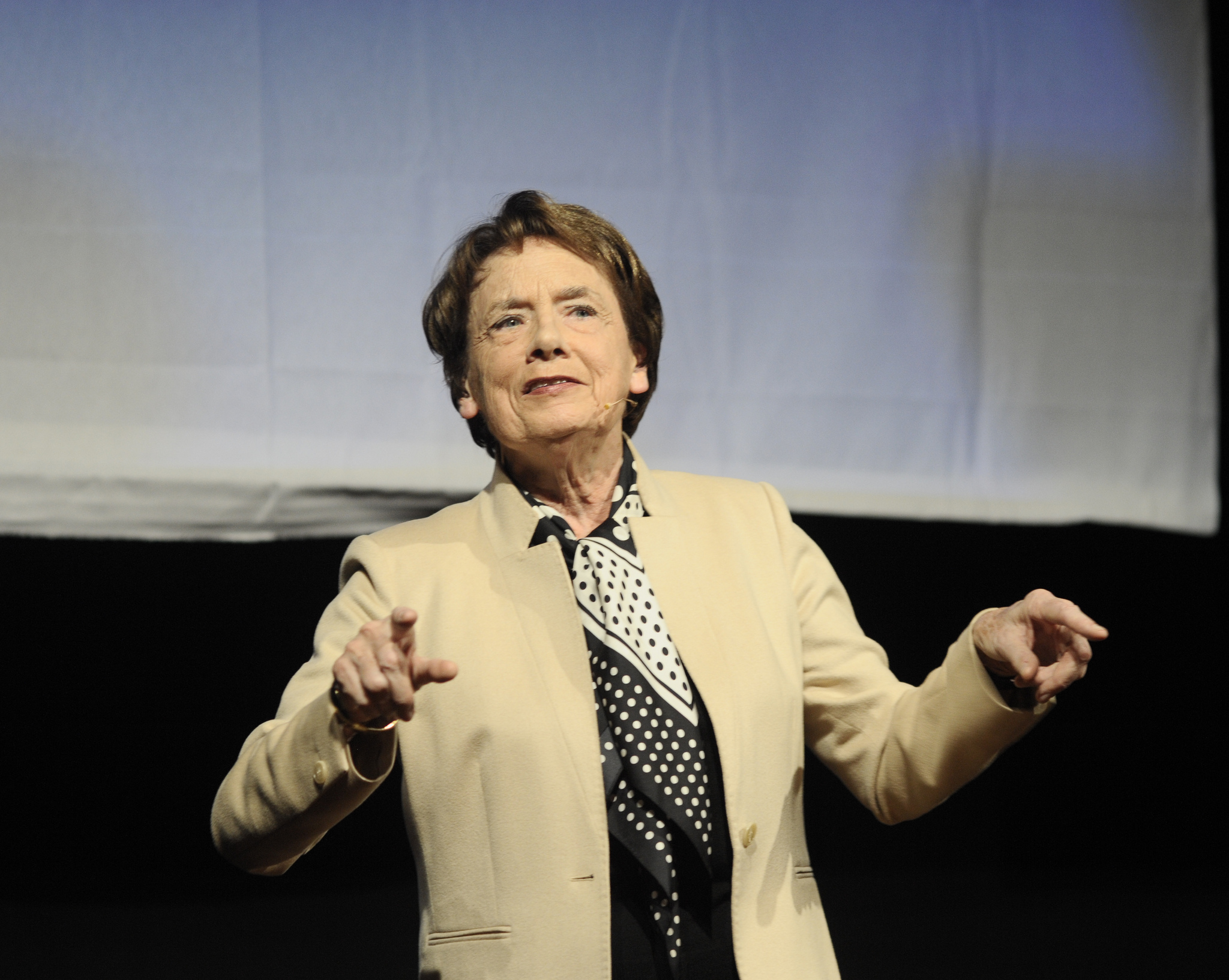
- Lalumière in 2014

Member of the European Parliament
- In office 20 July 1994 – 12 June 2004

Secretary General of the Council of Europe
- In office 1 June 1989 – 31 May 1994
- Preceded by: Marcelino Oreja
- Succeeded by: Daniel Tarschys

Personal details
- Born: 3 August 1935 (age 91) Rennes, France
- Party: Radical Party of the Left
- Education: University of Rennes

Catherine Lalumière (born 3 August 1935) is a French politician of the Radical Party of the Left.

Before her political career, she lectured on public law at the University of Rennes and Paris 1 Panthéon-Sorbonne University. She began a foray into politics in 1981 as Minister of Consumption in the cabinet of Pierre Mauroy, and held several offices throughout the 1980s.

She served as Secretary General of the Council of Europe from 1989 to 1994, and became a member of the European Parliament in 1994, re-elected in 1999 until 2004.

She served as vice-president of the International European Movement where she chaired the Working Group on Enlargement.

Lalumière is currently President of the Maison de l'Europe de Paris. Since December 2021, she is the founding president of the Pierre and Catherine Lalumière Foundation, hosted by the Fondation de France.

== Education and Academic Career ==
Catherine Lalumière holds a Doctorate in Public Law from the University of Rennes in 1968 and later became a lecturer. From 1960 to 1981, she taught at the universities of Rennes, Bordeaux, and Paris 1 Panthéon-Sorbonne. She comes from a Protestant family in Rennes and does not hide her adherence to Protestantism.

== Political career ==
Catherine Lalumière entered the national political scene following the election of François Mitterrand as President of the Republic in May 1981.

She was appointed Secretary of State for Public Service and Administrative Reform to Prime Minister Pierre Mauroy's first government in May 1981.

After being elected as a deputy for the first time in Gironde in June 1981, she was appointed Minister of Consumer Affairs in Pierre Mauroy's second government.

In 1983, following her unsuccessful bid for the mayorship of Bordeaux against incumbent mayor Jacques Chaban-Delmas, she retained the portfolio of Consumer Affairs but her ministry was transformed into a secretary of state position under the Minister of Economy, Finance, and Budget, Jacques Delors. She relied in particular on Christiane Doré, the "number 2" in the ministry.

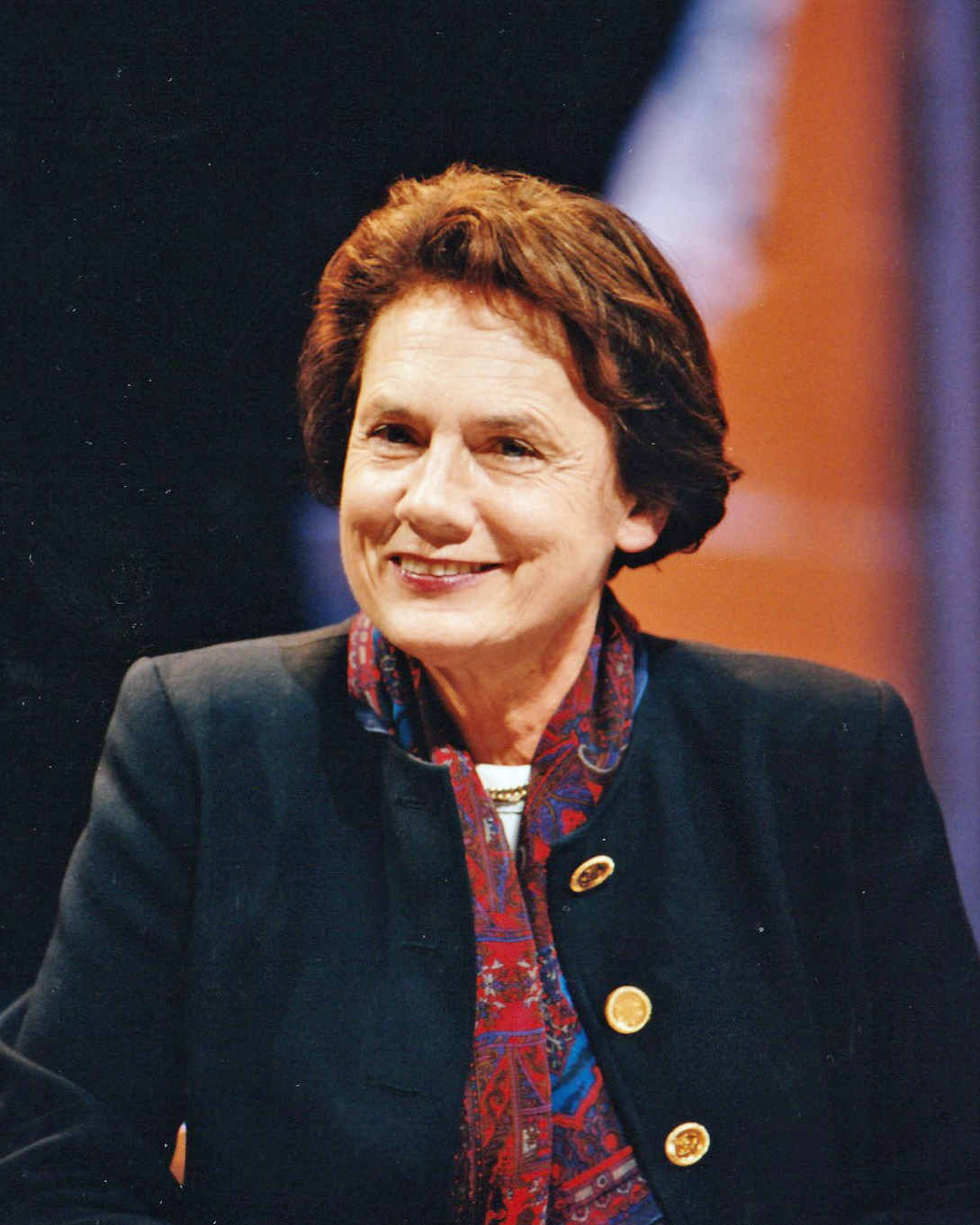
Catherine Lalumière speaking at the 1998 International Geography Festival.

On December 7, 1984, she was appointed Secretary of State for European Affairs in Laurent Fabius's government. In this capacity, she signed the Schengen Agreement on behalf of France in 1985.

She was reelected as a deputy in 1986 and 1988 and served as the Secretary-General of the Council of Europe from June 1989. In the following month, she received the Secretary-General of the Communist Party of the Soviet Union, Mikhail Gorbachev, who presented his vision of a united Europe within the "Common European Home." During her tenure, she promoted the establishment of a network of Schools of Political Studies within the Council of Europe, aimed at training young political leaders in emerging democracies of the former Eastern Bloc. She also inaugurated the new premises of the European Court of Human Rights in Strasbourg.

At the end of her term at the Council of Europe in May 1994, Catherine Lalumière was excluded from the socialist list led by Michel Rocard and subsequently distanced herself from the Socialist Party. She joined the list of Bernard Tapie's Energy Radical party. She was elected as a Member of the European Parliament in 1994 and reelected in 1999 on a list supported by the Socialist Party (PS), Radical Party of the Left (PRG), and Citizens' Movement (MDC). She served as vice-president of the European Parliament from 2001 to 2004.

In 2003, she became the head of the Maison de l'Europe de Paris, an association whose main objective is to promote European citizenship. In 2008, she was elected President of the French Federation of European Houses, an association that brings together around thirty Houses throughout France. She left her position in 2020.

In December 2021, she established the Pierre et Catherine Lalumière Foundation, hosted by the Fondation de France.

She was appointed Officer of the Legion of Honour in January 2017.

Political offices
| Preceded by Marcelino Oreja Aguirre | Secretary General of the Council of Europe; 1 June 1989 - 31 May 1994 | Succeeded by Daniel Tarschys |
