= Daniel Tarschys =

Swedish academic and politician

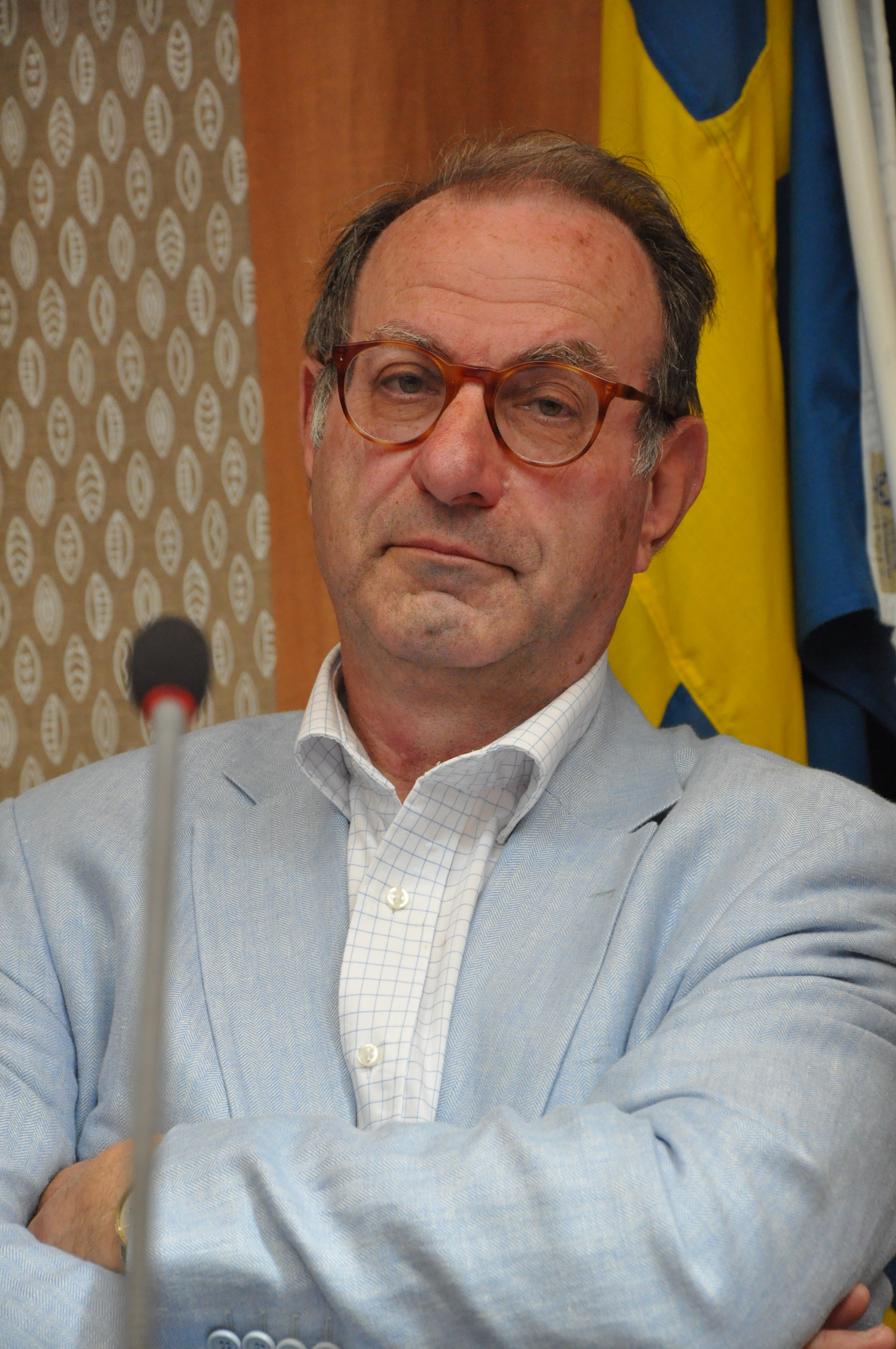
- Tarschys in 2011

Secretary General of the Council of Europe
- In office 20 June 1994 – 1 September 1999
- Preceded by: Catherine Lalumière
- Succeeded by: Walter Schwimmer

Member of Parliament
- In office 1994–1985
- Constituency: Stockholm County
- In office 1976–1982
- Constituency: Stockholm County

Personal details
- Born: 21 July 1943; Nils Daniel Tarschys
- Political party: Liberal People's Party

Nils Daniel Tarschys (born 21 July 1943) is a Swedish academic and politician who is currently professor of political science at Stockholm University. He previously served as Secretary General of the Council of Europe from 1994 to 1999.

Tarschys was born into an academic family. Both his parents taught at Swedish universities. He is married and has two daughters.

He was Secretary General of the Council of Europe from 20 June 1994 to 1 September 1999, when he was succeeded by Walter Schwimmer. His tenure was remarkable for the accession of a number of countries, notably Russia, to the Council of Europe. He is credited with the motto "Better include than exclude". He repeatedly defended the accession of Russia against criticism that it was premature and that Russia was not yet ready to embrace the standards of the Council of Europe.

In 1972 he completed his PhD thesis on "Beyond the State: The Future Polity in Classical and Soviet Marxism".

He was appointed professor of Eastern European research at Uppsala University in 1983 and professor of political science at Stockholm University in 1985.

He was a member of the Riksdag for the Liberal People's Party in 1976 to 1982 and from 1985 to 1994, representing Stockholm County. He chaired the Social Committee from 1985 to 1991 and the Foreign Affairs Committee from 1991 to 1994.

He was also a member of the Swedish delegation to the Parliamentary Assembly of the Council of Europe.

He served as State Secretary from 1978 to 1979 in the cabinet of Prime Minister Ola Ullsten.

He has published numerous papers and reports. In 2008 he was elected to the Royal Swedish Academy of Sciences.

== Bibliography ==
- The Soviet political agenda : problems and priorities, 1950–1970, Macmillan, 1979
- Promoting Cohesion: The Role of the European Union, Arena Conference, 2002
- Maximising what? On the multiple objectives of EU cohesion policy, Maribor, 2008
