= Franz Karasek =

Austrian politician (1924–1986)

Franz Karasek (22 April 1924 in Vienna – 10 March 1986 in Vienna) was an Austrian politician.

== Education ==
He studied international law in Paris and graduated as a Doctor of Law from the University of Vienna.

== Career ==
He became a diplomat and helped negotiate Austria's return to full sovereignty in 1955, the year when Austria joined the Council of Europe.

He joined the Austrian People's Party (ÖVP) in 1951. From 1950 to 1952, he was an official in the Austrian Ministry of Foreign Affairs.

From 1952 to 1953 he was secretary to Chancellor Leopold Figl. He entered the Parliamentary Assembly of the Council of Europe in 1970, four years after he was elected to the Nationalrat.

He served as president of the Cultural Commission and General Rapporteur of the Political Committee of the Parliamentary Assembly. He was Secretary General of the Council of Europe from 1 October 1979, to 1 October 1984. He was married and had two children.
