= Erasmus+ =

European Commission programme for education, training, youth, and sport

Map of Erasmus+ participation in 2026: Colour / Category; / EU Member States (Programme Countries); / Third Countries Associated with Erasmus+; / United Kingdom – joining 2027; / Non‑associated countries

Erasmus+ is the European Commission's programme for promoting education, training, youth, and sport for the 2021–2027 period, succeeding the previous Erasmus Programme (2014–2020). As an integrated programme, Erasmus+ offers more opportunities for the mobility of learners and staff and cooperation across the education, training, and youth sectors and is easier to access than its predecessors, with simplified funding rules and a structure that aims to streamline the administration of the programme. EU Member States and third countries associated with the Programme can fully take part in all the Actions of Erasmus+. The third countries associated with the Programme are North Macedonia, Serbia, Iceland, Liechtenstein, Norway and Turkey.

In the EU-UK summit on 19 May 2025, the UK and the European Commission agreed to work towards the association of the UK with the Erasmus+ programme. The UK had previously opted not to take part as an associated third country in the Erasmus+ programme 2021-27 after Brexit. In December 2025, the UK government announced it would rejoin the scheme in 2027.

The new Erasmus+ Program, running from 2021 to 2027, is more digital, inclusive and innovative, as well as greener.

== Introduction ==
The new, larger programme for the period 2021–2027 focuses on inclusion. The Programme is open to students, apprentices, teachers, lecturers, young people, volunteers, youth workers, and people working in grassroots sport. Approximately two-thirds of the budget is allocated to learning opportunities abroad for individuals, within the EU and beyond; the remainder will support partnerships between educational institutions, youth organisations, businesses, local and regional authorities and NGOs, as well as reforms to modernise education, training and youth systems.

== Scope and objectives ==
The programme's objective is pursued through three “Key Actions”:

- Key Action 1: Learning mobility of individuals
- Key Action 2: Cooperation among organisations and institutions
- Key Action 3: Support to policy development and cooperation

Other activities include “Jean Monnet” actions, which support teaching, learning, research and debates on European integration matters, such as on the EU’s future challenges and opportunities.

== Jean Monnet Chairs ==
As part of the Jean Monnet Programme, there are Chairs as teaching posts with a specialization in European Union studies for university professors or senior lecturers. Jean Monnet Chairs can:

- enhance the teaching of EU studies at your institution through the curriculum
- conduct, monitor, and supervise research on EU matters at all education levels
- be a mentor and advisor to the next generation of teachers and researchers
- provide expert guidance to future professionals about European matters

Jean Monnet Chairs are encouraged to:

- publish books within their university press during the grant period. The grant will cover part of the publication and, if need be, part of the translation costs
- participate in dissemination and information events in your country and around Europe
- organize events (lectures, seminars, workshops, etc.) with policymakers, civil society, and schools
- network with other academics and institutions supported by Jean Monnet
- apply open educational resources, and publish the summaries, content, schedule, and expected outcomes of your activities

== Gallery ==
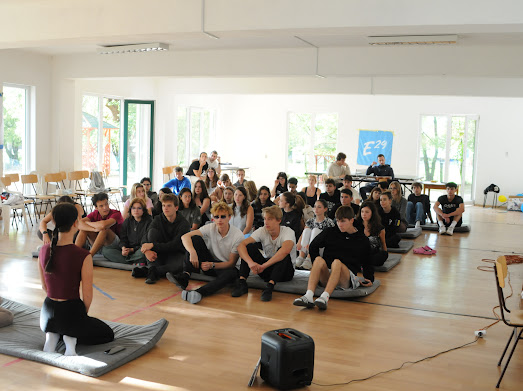
Session on Erasmus+ project

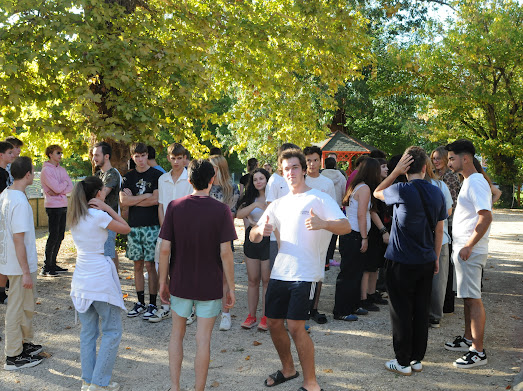
Session on Erasmus+ project

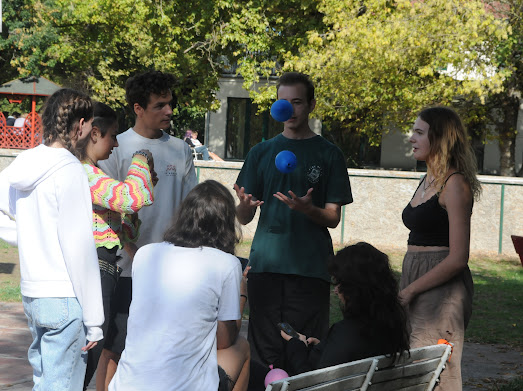
Session on Erasmus+ project

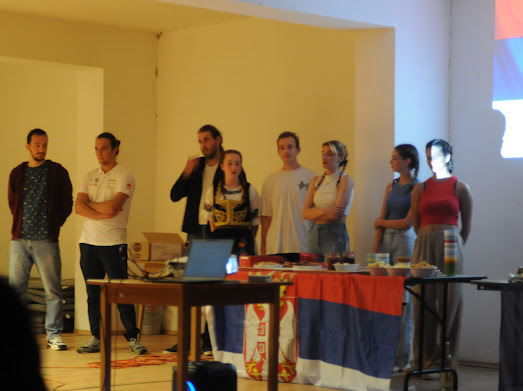
Serbian cultural night on Erasmus+ project

== See also ==
- Erasmus Mundus
- Swiss-European Mobility Programme
- TEMPUS
