= Secretary General of the Council of Europe =

Political role in the Council of Europe

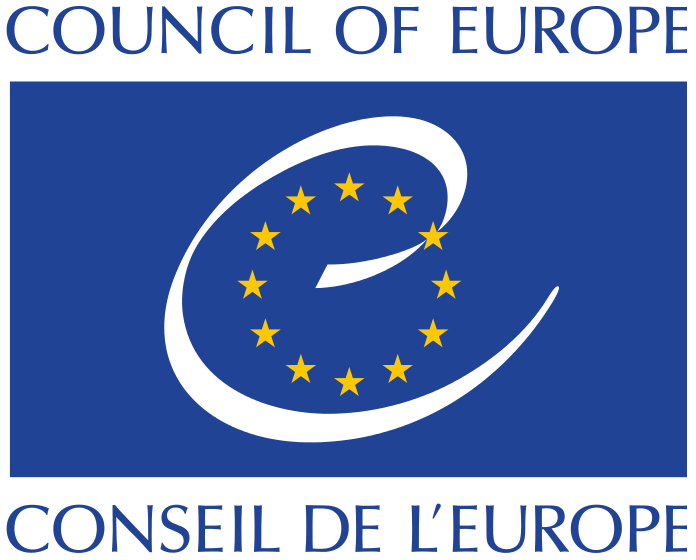
- Emblem of the Council of Europe

- Flag of Europe

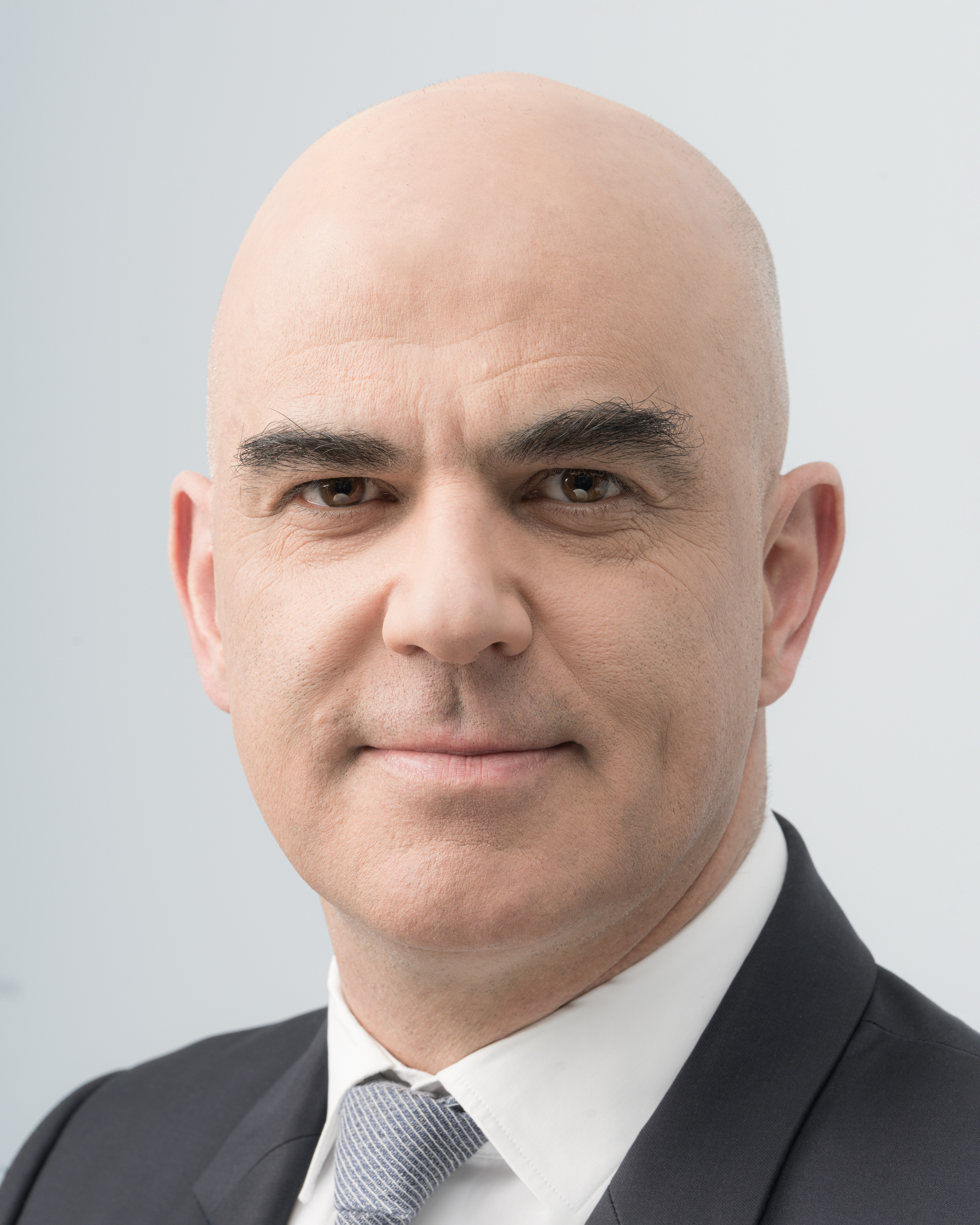
- Incumbent; Alain Berset since 18 September 2024
- Appointer: Parliamentary Assembly of the Council of Europe
- Term length: 5 years
- Inaugural holder: Jacques Camille Paris
- Formation: 1949
- Deputy: Bjørn Berge
- Website: coe.int/t/secretarygeneral

The secretary general of the Council of Europe (French: secrétaire général du Conseil de l'Europe) is elected by the Parliamentary Assembly from a shortlist proposed by the Committee of Ministers for a term of five years.

The secretary general is entrusted with the responsibility of meeting the aim for which the Council of Europe was set up in London on 5 May 1949, namely to achieve greater unity between its member states for the purpose of safeguarding and realising the ideals and principles which are their common heritage and facilitating their economic and social progress.

Although the secretary general's powers are not clearly defined, in practice the holder has overall responsibility for the strategic management of the Council of Europe's work programme and budget and oversees the day-to-day running of the Organisation and Secretariat.

== List of secretaries general ==
N.	Country	Image	Person	Took office	Left office
1	France		Jacques Camille Paris	11 August 1949	17 July 1953
2	France		Léon Marchal	21 September 1953	24 September 1956
3	Italy		Lodovico Benvenuti	19 September 1957	15 March 1964
4	United Kingdom		Peter Smithers	16 March 1964	15 September 1969
5	Austria		Lujo Tončić-Sorinj	16 September 1969	16 September 1974
6	Germany		Georg Kahn-Ackermann	17 September 1974	17 September 1979
7	Austria		Franz Karasek	1 October 1979	1 October 1984
8	Spain		Marcelino Oreja Aguirre	1 October 1984	1 June 1989
9	France		Catherine Lalumière	1 June 1989	1 June 1994
10	Sweden		Daniel Tarschys	1 June 1994	1 September 1999
11	Austria		Walter Schwimmer	1 September 1999	1 September 2004
12	United Kingdom		Terry Davis	1 September 2004	1 September 2009
13	Norway		Thorbjørn Jagland	1 October 2009	18 September 2019
14	Croatia		Marija Pejčinović Burić	18 September 2019	18 September 2024
15	Switzerland		Alain Berset	18 September 2024	In office

== Elections ==
=== 2009 ===
On 12 May 2009 the Committee of Ministers informed the Parliamentary Assembly that there would be only two candidates for the post of secretary general: Thorbjørn Jagland (former prime minister of Norway) and Włodzimierz Cimoszewicz (former Prime Minister of Poland), thus rejecting a Belgian appeal to add two more people to the list of the candidates. Coincidentally, both candidates were Prime Ministers at the same time (1996–1997) and both are social democrats. On 23 June the Council of Europe Parliamentary Assembly decided to postpone the election at least until its September session, thus leaving the chair empty from 1 September 2009.

The Parliamentary Assembly was angered by the decision of the Committee of Ministers to remove two of the four candidates from the shortlist: Belgian senator Luc Van den Brande and Hungarian parliamentarian Mátyás Eörsi, who are both members of the Parliamentary Assembly. On 11 September 2009, reporting on the election controversy, Le Monde reported that the future secretary general would inherit an institution that was in crisis.

On 30 September 2009 Thorbjørn Jagland was elected as secretary-general. On 24 June 2014 he was re-elected to a second, five-year term to start on 1 October 2014.

=== 2019 ===
Four member states proposed candidates by 10 January 2019, who were then considered by the Committee of Ministers. Among them, the two who were selected to progress to be voted on by the Parliamentary Assembly were Belgium's foreign minister Didier Reynders and Croatia's foreign minister Marija Pejčinović Burić. Pejčinvoić Burić was elected by a margin of 54 votes and took office on 15 October 2019.

Nominated for consideration by the Committee of Ministers:

- Didier Reynders (Belgium)
- Andrius Kubilius (Lithuania)
- Dora Bakoyannis (Greece)
- Marija Pejčinović Burić (Croatia)

Selected by the Committee to be voted on by the Parliamentary Assembly:

The Parliamentary Assembly voted on the candidates on 26 June 2019

- Marija Pejčinović Burić: 159 votes
- Didier Reynders: 105 votes

=== 2024 ===
The Parliamentary Assembly voted on the candidates on 25 June 2024

- Alain Berset: 114 votes
- Indrek Saar: 85 votes
- Didier Reynders: 46 votes
