= Eurodroite =

Far-right European political alliance

Euroright: Eurodroite; Eurodestra
- Abbreviation: Ed
- President: Giorgio Almirante
- Founder: Giorgio Almirante
- Founded: 19 April 1978
- Dissolved: 24 July 1984
- Succeeded by: Group of the European Right (political group)
- Ideology: Neo-fascism; Euroscepticism
- Political position: Far-right
- European Parliament group: Non-Inscrits
- 1st European Parliament: 4 / 410

Eurodroite (French pronunciation: [øʁɔdʁwat]; English: Euroright) was a far-right European political alliance that took part in the 1979 European Parliament election. It did not register as a European political party or a political group of the European Parliament because it only had four seats, all held by the neo-fascist Italian Social Movement. The Group of the European Right became its formal successor following the 1984 European Parliament election.

== History ==
Giorgio Almirante, the president of the neo-fascist Italian Social Movement (MSI), envisioned to create an alliance of far-right political parties from Europe. Almirante said that the objective of the alliance would be to "prevent the European Parliament shifting to the left" and that it would be strongly anti-communist. At the founding congress of Eurodroite on 19 April 1978, Almirante's MSI was also joined by the French Party of New Forces (PFN) of Jean-Louis Tixier-Vignancour and New Force (FN) of Blas Piñar.

Shortly before the formation of Eurodroite, Tixier-Vignancour was supposed to be a candidate of Jean-Marie Le Pen's National Front. Another meeting of the Eurodroite was held on 27 June in Paris, with about two thousand participants, according to the Le Monde diplomatique newspaper. Left-wing organisations held a counter-protest to the meeting in Paris. Le Pen was critical of the Eurodroite project because of the participation of PFN.

In the 1979 European Parliament election, MSI was the only party from the Eurodroite that crossed the threshold, obtaining four seats. It was thus unable to form a group in the European Parliament.

The Eurodroite alliance was succeeded in 1984, when the Group of the European Right was officially formed. FN and the National Political Union (EPEN) of former military dictator Georgios Papadopoulos were members of this new group, while PFN was replaced by Le Pen's National Front.

== Ideology ==
The Eurodroite was a far-right alliance composed of neo-fascist parties. It opposed the rise of Eurocommunism.

== Members ==
The following parties were members of the Eurodroite alliance. The FN and EPEN did not contest the 1979 election, as Spain and Greece were not yet member states of the European Union.

Country	Name		Ideology	MEPs
Italy	Italian Social Movement	MSI	Neo-fascism; Italian nationalism	4 / 410
France	Party of New Forces	PFN	Neo-fascism; Anti-communism	0 / 410
Belgium	Party of New Forces	PFN	Neo-fascism; Neo-Nazism	0 / 410
Greece	National Political Union	EPEN	Metaxism; Greek nationalism	Not in the EU
Spain	New Force	FN	Neo-fascism; Francoism	Not in the EU

== See also ==
- European Right (1984–1989)
- European Right (1989–1994)
- Euronat (1997-2009)
