= 1984 European Parliament election =

- 14–17 June 1984

All 434 seats to the European Parliament 218 seats needed for a majority
- Turnout: 61% ▼2.0 pp
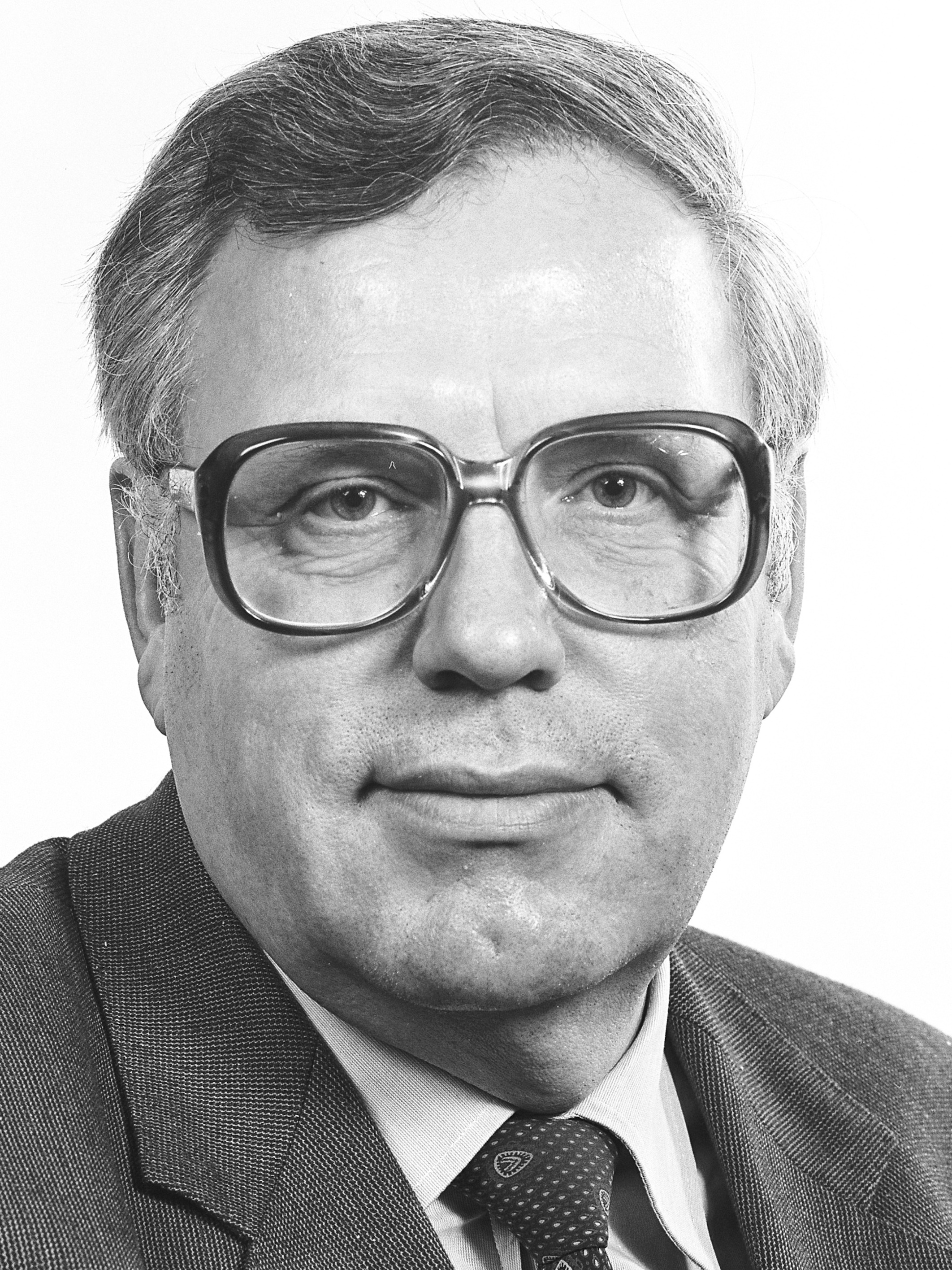

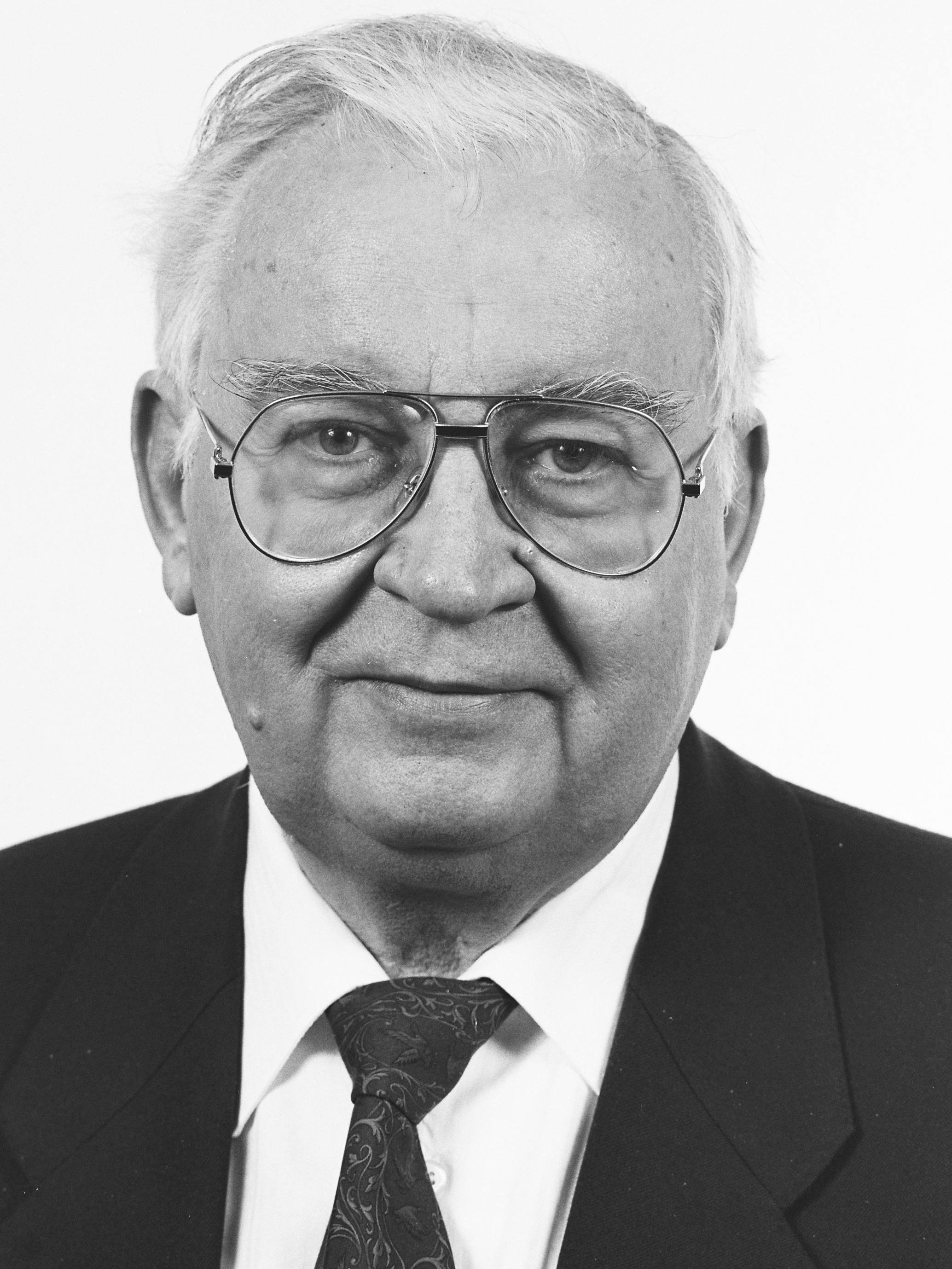

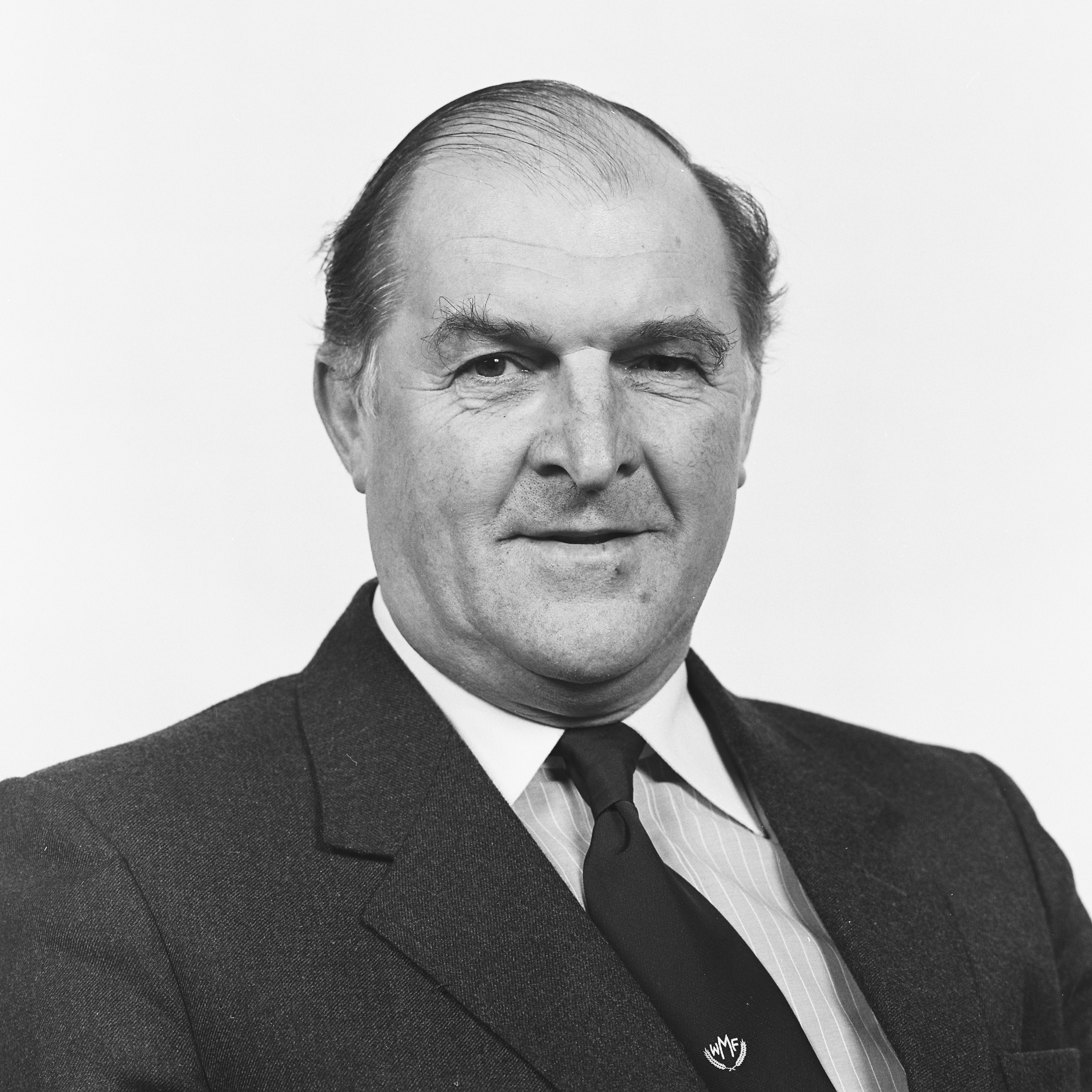

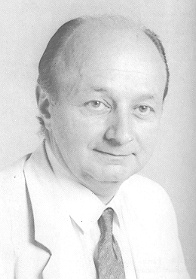

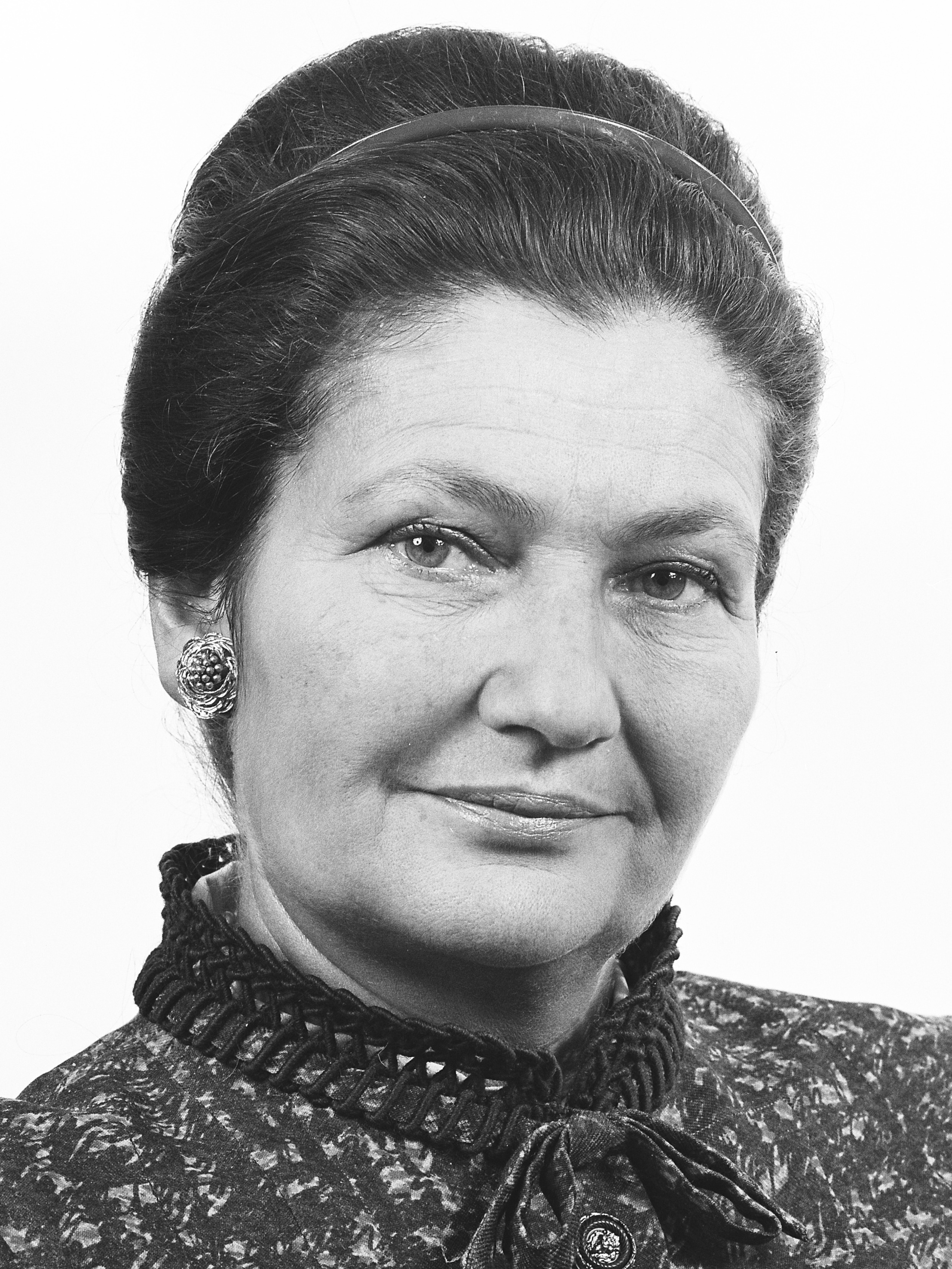

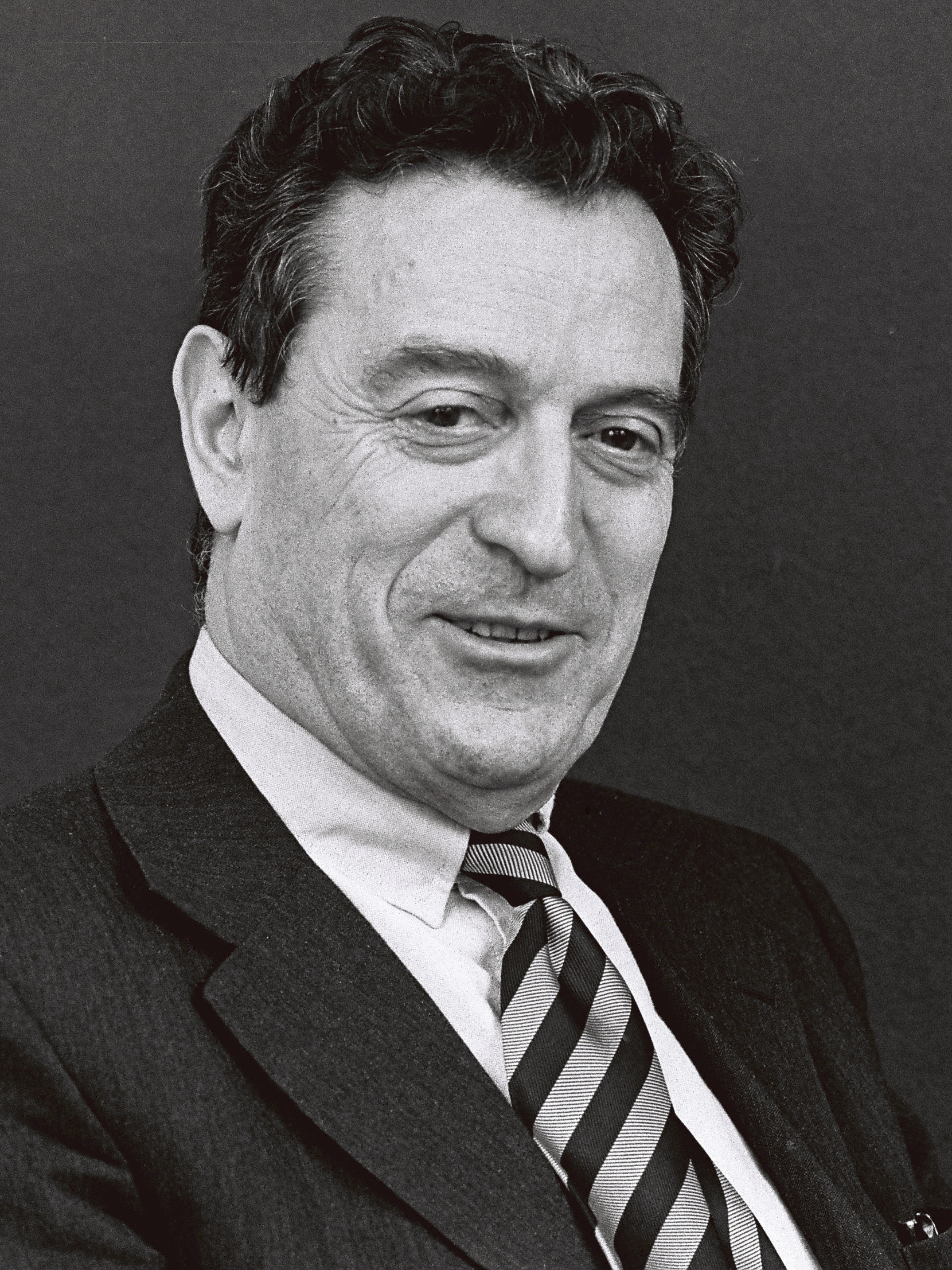
	First party	Second party	Third party
Leader	Rudi Arndt	Egon Klepsch	Henry Plumb
Party	SOC	EPP	ED
Leader's seat	Germany	Germany	Cotswolds
Last election	113, 27.6%	107, 26.1%	64, 15.6%
Seats won	130*	110*	50*
Seat change	▲17	▲3	▼14
Percentage	30%	25.3%	11.5%
Swing	▲2.4%	▼0.8%	▼4.1%
	Fourth party	Fifth party	Sixth party
Leader	Giovanni Cervetti	Simone Veil	Christian de La Malène
Party	COM	ELDR	EPD
Leader's seat	North-West Italy	France	France
Last election	44, 10.7%	40, 9.8%	22, 5.4%
Seats won	41	31	29
Seat change	▼3	▼9	▲7
Percentage	9.4%	7.1%	6.7%
Swing	▼1.3%	▼2.7%	▲1.3%
- Post-election composition of each member state's delegation * The number of seats was increased from 410 to 434 – so this is a nominal figure
President of the European Parliament before election
Piet Dankert
SOC
President of the European Parliament after election
Pierre Pflimlin
EPP

The 1984 European Parliament election was the first since the inaugural election of 1979 and the 1981 enlargement of the European Community to include Greece. It was also the last before the accession of Spain and Portugal in 1986.

Results showed centre-left and right-wing MEPs profiting at the expense of the far-left and centre-right. The Socialists consolidated their position as the biggest group in the Parliament, and there were notable changes for the smaller groups, with far-right MEPs forming a group and the coalescence of the Green and Regionalist group known as "Rainbow". The overall turnout dropped to 61%. No party could achieve majority.

== Electoral system ==
There was no single uniform voting system for all member states; each of them adopted its own method, established by national law.

The United Kingdom used a one-round (first-past-the-post) system of 78 constituencies in England, Wales and Scotland, while in Northern Ireland 3 proportional seats were allocated. Belgium, Ireland and Italy used a proportional system with subdivision of the territory into constituencies. Denmark, France, West Germany, Greece, Luxembourg and the Netherlands used a single national proportional system, although in the case of Denmark, Greenland had its own constituency with the allocation of one seat and in the case of West Germany the three seats for the West Berlin area were not directly elected but were chosen by the Berlin House of Representatives, given the particular status of the city.

== Pre-election ==
=== Seat changes ===
The number of seats was the same as before for each member state that took part in the 1979 election. Greece, which had joined in 1981, was allocated 24 new seats. This raised the number of seats to 434 from 410.

National distribution of seats
State	Seats	State	Seats
West Germany	81	Belgium	24
United Kingdom	81	Greece	24
France	81	Denmark	16
Italy	81	Ireland	15
Netherlands	25	Luxembourg	6

== Election and regrouping ==
=== Overview ===
The Socialists increased their share by six seats to 130 seats, up from 124 before the elections. The Democratic Alliance (formerly Progressive Democrats) also made gains, up by seven to 29 seats. The People's Party's, the European Democrats, Communists and Liberals all lost seats. The French National Front and the Italian Social Movement founded a group called the "European Right": the first far-right group in the Parliament. The Technical Group of Independents was replaced by the Rainbow Group, a mixture of Greens and Regionalists.

=== Final results ===
Party or alliance		Votes	%	Seats	+/–
Group of the European People's Party (EPP)	Christian Democracy (Italy) (DC)	11,583,767	10.08	26	-3
Group of the European People's Party (EPP)	Christian Democratic Union of Germany (CDU)	9,308,411	8.10	34	0
Group of the European People's Party (EPP)	New Democracy (Greece) (ND)	2,266,568	1.97	9	+1
Group of the European People's Party (EPP)	Christian Social Union in Bavaria (CSU)	2,109,130	1.83	7	-1
Group of the European People's Party (EPP)	Union for French Democracy (UDF)	1,831,599	1.59	9	+1
Group of the European People's Party (EPP)	Christian Democratic Appeal (CDA)	1,590,218	1.38	8	-2
Group of the European People's Party (EPP)	Christian People's Party (Flanders) (CVP)	1,132,682	0.99	4	-3
Group of the European People's Party (EPP)	Christian Social Party (Wallonia) (PSC)	436,108	0.38	2	-1
Group of the European People's Party (EPP)	Fine Gael	361,034	0.31	6	+2
Group of the European People's Party (EPP)	Christian Social People's Party (Luxembourg) (CSV)	345,586	0.30	3	0
Group of the European People's Party (EPP)	South Tyrolean People's Party (SVP)	198,220	0.17	1	0
Group of the European People's Party (EPP)	Centre Democrats (Denmark) (CD)	131,984	0.11	1	0
Group of the European People's Party (EPP)	Total	31,295,307	27.22	110	-5
Socialist Group (SOC)	Social Democratic Party of Germany (SPD)	9,296,417	8.09	33	-2
Socialist Group (SOC)	Labour Party (UK)	4,865,224	4.23	32	+15
Socialist Group (SOC)	Socialist Party (France) (PS)	4,188,875	3.64	20	0
Socialist Group (SOC)	Italian Socialist Party (PSI)	3,940,445	3.43	9	0
Socialist Group (SOC)	PASOK (Greece)	2,476,491	2.15	10	0
Socialist Group (SOC)	Labour Party (Netherlands) (PvdA)	1,785,165	1.55	9	0
Socialist Group (SOC)	Italian Democratic Socialist Party (PSDI)	1,225,462	1.07	3	-1
Socialist Group (SOC)	Socialist Party (Flanders) (SP)	956,518	0.83	3	0
Socialist Group (SOC)	Socialist Party (Wallonia) (PS)	527,297	0.46	4	0
Socialist Group (SOC)	Social Democrats (Denmark)	387,098	0.34	3	0
Socialist Group (SOC)	Luxembourg Socialist Workers' Party (LSAP)	211,106	0.18	2	+1
Socialist Group (SOC)	Social Democratic and Labour Party (SDLP)	140,622	0.12	1	0
Socialist Group (SOC)	Labour Party (Ireland)	93,656	0.08	0	-4
Socialist Group (SOC)	Siumut	7,364	0.01	1	0
Socialist Group (SOC)	Total	30,101,740	26.18	130	+7
Communists and Allies Group (COM)	Italian Communist Party (PCI)	11,624,430	10.11	26	+2
Communists and Allies Group (COM)	French Communist Party (PCF)	2,261,312	1.97	10	-9
Communists and Allies Group (COM)	Communist Party of Greece	693,304	0.60	3	0
Communists and Allies Group (COM)	Communist Party of Greece (Interior)	203,813	0.18	1	0
Communists and Allies Group (COM)	Socialist People's Party (Denmark) (SF)	183,580	0.16	1	0
Communists and Allies Group (COM)	Communist Party of Belgium (KPB/PCB)	87,379	0.08	0	0
Communists and Allies Group (COM)	Communist Party of Luxembourg (KPL)	40,395	0.04	0	0
Communists and Allies Group (COM)	Total	15,094,213	13.13	41	-7
Liberal and Democratic Group (LD)	SDP–Liberal Alliance (UK)	2,591,659	2.25	0	0
Liberal and Democratic Group (LD)	Union for French Democracy (UDF)	2,569,499	2.24	12	-5
Liberal and Democratic Group (LD)	Italian Liberal Party – Italian Republican Party (PLI–PRI)	2,140,501	1.86	5	0
Liberal and Democratic Group (LD)	Free Democratic Party (Germany) (FDP)	1,192,624	1.04	0	-4
Liberal and Democratic Group (LD)	People's Party for Freedom and Democracy (VVD)	1,002,685	0.87	5	+1
Liberal and Democratic Group (LD)	Liberal Reformist Party (Wallonia) (PRL)	540,610	0.47	3	+1
Liberal and Democratic Group (LD)	Party for Freedom and Progress (Flanders) (PVV)	494,277	0.43	2	0
Liberal and Democratic Group (LD)	Venstre (Denmark)	248,397	0.22	2	-1
Liberal and Democratic Group (LD)	Democratic Party (Luxembourg) (DP)	218,481	0.19	1	-1
Liberal and Democratic Group (LD)	Thomas Joseph Maher (Independent from Ireland)	55,079	0.05	1	–
Liberal and Democratic Group (LD)	Liberal Party (Greece) (RV)	20,908	0.02	0	0
Liberal and Democratic Group (LD)	Total	11,074,720	9.63	31	-9
European Democratic Group (ED)	Conservative Party (UK)	5,426,866	4.72	45	-15
European Democratic Group (ED)	Conservative People's Party (Denmark) (DKF)	414,177	0.36	4	+2
European Democratic Group (ED)	Ulster Unionist Party (UUP)	147,169	0.13	1	0
European Democratic Group (ED)	Total	5,988,212	5.21	50	-14
Group of the European Democratic Alliance (EDA)	Rally for the Republic (France) (RPR)	4,282,498	3.73	20	+5
Group of the European Democratic Alliance (EDA)	Fianna Fáil	438,946	0.38	8	+3
Group of the European Democratic Alliance (EDA)	Scottish National Party (SNP)	230,594	0.20	1	0
Group of the European Democratic Alliance (EDA)	Total	4,952,038	4.31	29	+7
Group of the European Right (DR)	Italian Social Movement (MSI)	2,274,556	1.98	5	+1
Group of the European Right (DR)	National Front (FN)	2,210,334	1.92	10	New
Group of the European Right (DR)	National Political Union (Greece) (EPEN)	136,642	0.12	1	New
Group of the European Right (DR)	Total	4,621,532	4.02	16	New
Rainbow Group (RBW)	The Greens (West Germany)	2,025,972	1.76	7	+7
Rainbow Group (RBW)	Proletarian Democracy (DP)	506,753	0.44	1	0
Rainbow Group (RBW)	People's Union (Flanders) (VU)	484,494	0.42	2	+1
Rainbow Group (RBW)	People's Movement against the EEC (Denmark)	413,808	0.36	4	0
Rainbow Group (RBW)	Green Progressive Accord (Netherlands)	296,488	0.26	2	New
Rainbow Group (RBW)	Agalev	246,712	0.21	1	+1
Rainbow Group (RBW)	Ecolo	220,663	0.19	1	+1
Rainbow Group (RBW)	Federalism - Europe of the Peoples (Italy)	193,430	0.17	1	+1
Rainbow Group (RBW)	Proletarian Unity Party (Italy) (PdUP)	89,998	0.08	1	0
Rainbow Group (RBW)	Independent Fianna Fáil	32,504	0.03	0	-1
Rainbow Group (RBW)	Total	4,510,822	3.92	20	New
Non-Inscrits (NI)	Radical Party (Italy) (PR)	1,199,876	1.04	3	0
Non-Inscrits (NI)	SGP–GPV–RPF (Netherlands)	275,786	0.24	1	New
Non-Inscrits (NI)	José Happart (Independent from Belgium, Wallonia)	234,996	0.20	1	–
Non-Inscrits (NI)	Democratic Unionist Party (DUP)	230,251	0.20	1	0
Non-Inscrits (NI)	Jef Ulburghs (Independent from Belgium, Flanders)	23,184	0.02	1	–
Non-Inscrits (NI)	Total	1,964,093	1.71	7	-2
Other parties and independents		5,363,569	4.67	0	-9
Total		114,966,246	100.00	434	–
Source: Belgian Elections, Folketingsårbog, France Politique, jcautran.free.fr, Politiquemania, ElectionsIreland.org, ElectionsIreland.org, Ikaria, Italian Ministry of the Interior, Public.lu, Kiesraad, UK Parliament briefing, Federal Statistics Office, Wahlen-in-Deutschland.de, Europe Politique

1984 European Parliament election - Groups at 23–26 July 1984
Group	Description	Chaired by	MEPs		
SOC	Social Democrats	Rudi Arndt	130		
EPP	Christian Democrats	Egon Klepsch	110		
ED	Conservatives	Henry Plumb	50		
COM	Communists and the Far Left	Gianni Cervetti	41		
LD	Liberals and Liberal Democrats	Simone Veil	31		
EDA	National Conservatives	Christian de La Malène	29		
RBW	Greens and Regionalists	Else Hammerich; Jaak Vandemeulebroucke; Bram van der Lek; Paul Staes	20		
DR	Far Right Nationalists	Jean-Marie Le Pen	16		
NI	Independents	none	7	Total: 434	Sources:

Votes summary
EPP	27.22%
SOC	26.18%
COM	13.13%
LD	9.63%
ED	5.21%
EDA	4.31%
DR	4.02%
RBW	3.92%
NI	1.71%
Others	4.67%

Seats summary
SOC	29.95%
EPP	25.35%
ED	11.52%
COM	9.45%
LD	7.14%
EDA	6.68%
RBW	4.61%
DR	3.69%
NI	1.61%

=== Results by country ===
Group Nation	SOC	EPP	ED	COM	LD	EDA	RBW	DR	NI	Total
Belgium	4 PS; 3 SP	4 CVP; 2 PSC			3 PRL; 2 PVV		2 VU; 1 Agalev; 1 Ecolo		2 Ind.	24
Denmark	3 A 1 Siu	1 D	4 C	1 SF	2 V		4 N			16
France	20 PS	7 UDF; 2 UDF (CDS)		10 PCF	6 UDF (PR); 5 UDF; 1 UDF (PRV)	20 RPR	UPC	10 FN		81
Greece	10 PASOK	9 ND		3 KKE; 1 KKE–E				1 EPEN		24
Ireland		6 FG			1 Ind.	8 FF				15
Italy	9 PSI; 3 PSDI	26 DC; 1 SVP		26 PCI	3 PLI; 2 PRI		1 PdUP; 1 DP; 1 PSd'Az	5 MSI	3 PR	81
Luxembourg	2 LSAP	3 CSV			1 DP					6
Netherlands	9 PvdA	8 CDA			5 VVD		1 PSP; 1 PPR		1 SGP	25
United Kingdom	32 LAB; 1 SDLP		45 CON; 1 UUP			1 SNP			1 DUP	81
West Germany	33 SPD	34 CDU; 7 CSU					7 Grünen			81
Total	130	110	50	41	31	29	20	16	7	434

=== Statistics ===
European Parliament election, 1984 - statistics
Area	Dates	Seats	Electorate	Turnout	Previous	Next	Election methods	Sources
European Community (EC-10)	14, 17 June 1984	434	200,505,752	61%	1979	1989	All PR, except UK (not NI) which used FPTP	

European Parliament election, 1984 - timeline
First Parliament		1984 election and regrouping		Second Parliament	
Groups	Pre-elections 1 January	Change	Results 23 July	New groups	First session 23 July
SOC	124	+6	130	SOC	130
EPP	117	-7	110	EPP	110
ED	63	-13	50	ED	50
COM	48	-7	41	COM	41
LD	38	-7	31	LD	31
EPD	22	+7	29	EDA	29
CDI	12	+8	20	RBW	20
NI	10	+13	7	NI	7
NI	10	+13	16	DR	16
Total	434	+0	434	Total	434

European Parliament election, 1984 - Delegation at 23 July 1984
Group	Description	Details	%	MEPs
SOC	Social Democrats	West Germany 33, Belgium 7, Denmark 4, France 20, Italy 12, Luxembourg 2, Netherlands 9, UK 33, Greece 10	30%	130
EPP	Christian Democrats	West Germany 41, Belgium 6, Denmark 1, France 9, Ireland 6, Italy 27, Luxembourg 3, Netherlands 8, Greece 9	25%	110
ED	Conservatives	Denmark 4, UK 46	12%	50
COM	Communists and the Far Left	Denmark 1, France 10, Italy 26, Greece 4	9%	41
LD	Liberals and Liberal Democrats	Belgium 5, Denmark 2, France 12, Ireland 1, Italy 5, Luxembourg 1, Netherlands 5	7%	31
EDA	National Conservatives	France 20, Ireland 8, UK 1	7%	29
RBW	Greens and Regionalists	West Germany 7, Belgium 4, Denmark 4, Italy 3, Netherlands 2	5%	20
DR	Far-Right Nationalists	France 10, Italy 5, Greece 1	4%	16
NI	Independents	Belgium 2, Italy 3, Netherlands 1, UK 1	2%	7
Sources:			100%	434
