= Franza =

Franza is an Italian surname. Notable people with the surname include:

- Enea Franza (1907–1986), Italian politician
- Luigi Franza (1939–2020), Italian politician, son of Enea
