= European Right =

European Right may refer to:

- European Right (1984–1989), European political group
- European Right (1989–1994), European political group
