= 1979 European Parliament election =

First election to the European Parliament

- 7–10 June 1979

All 410 seats to the European Parliament 206 seats needed for a majority
- Turnout: 114,340,366 / 184,414,900 (62.0%)
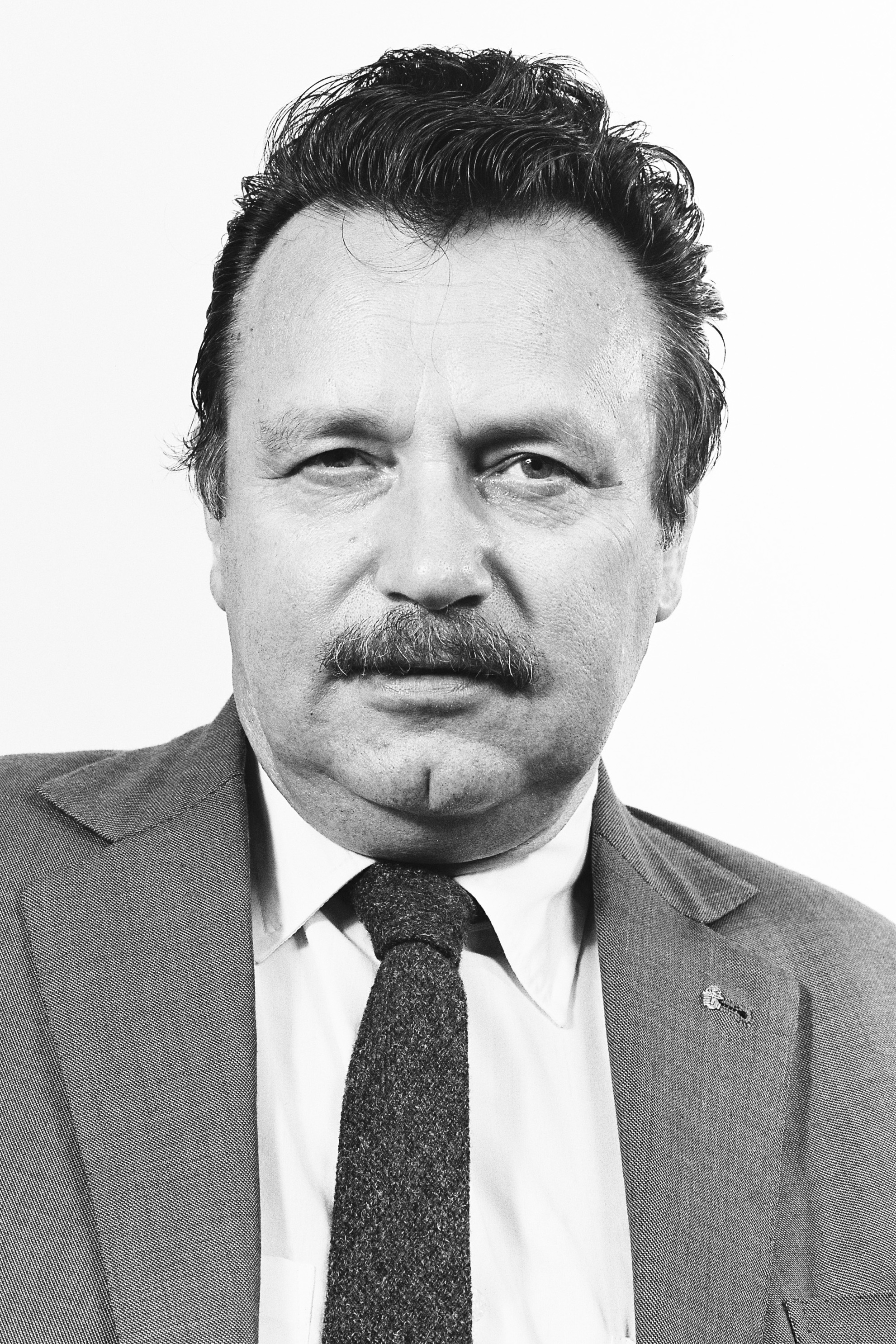

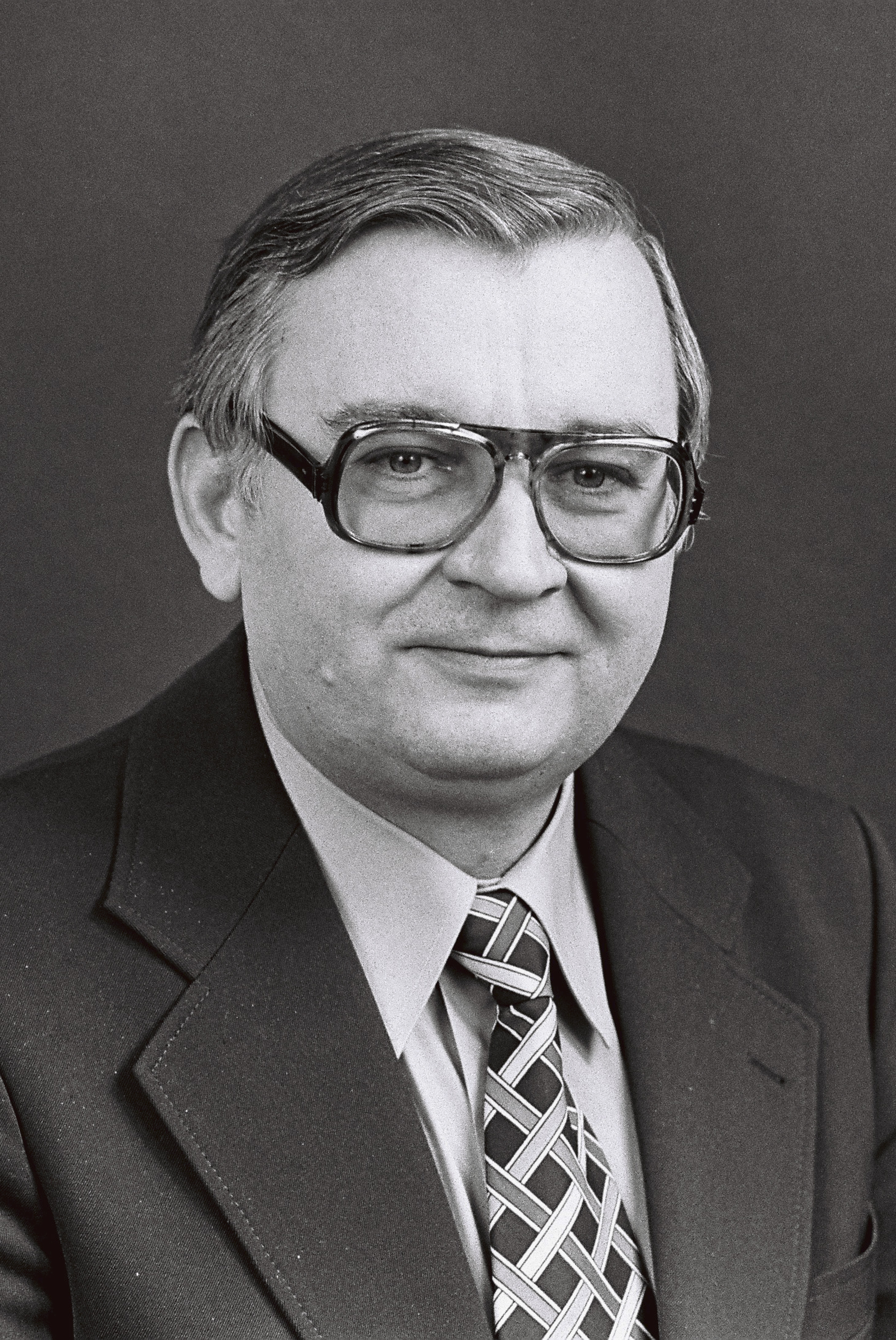

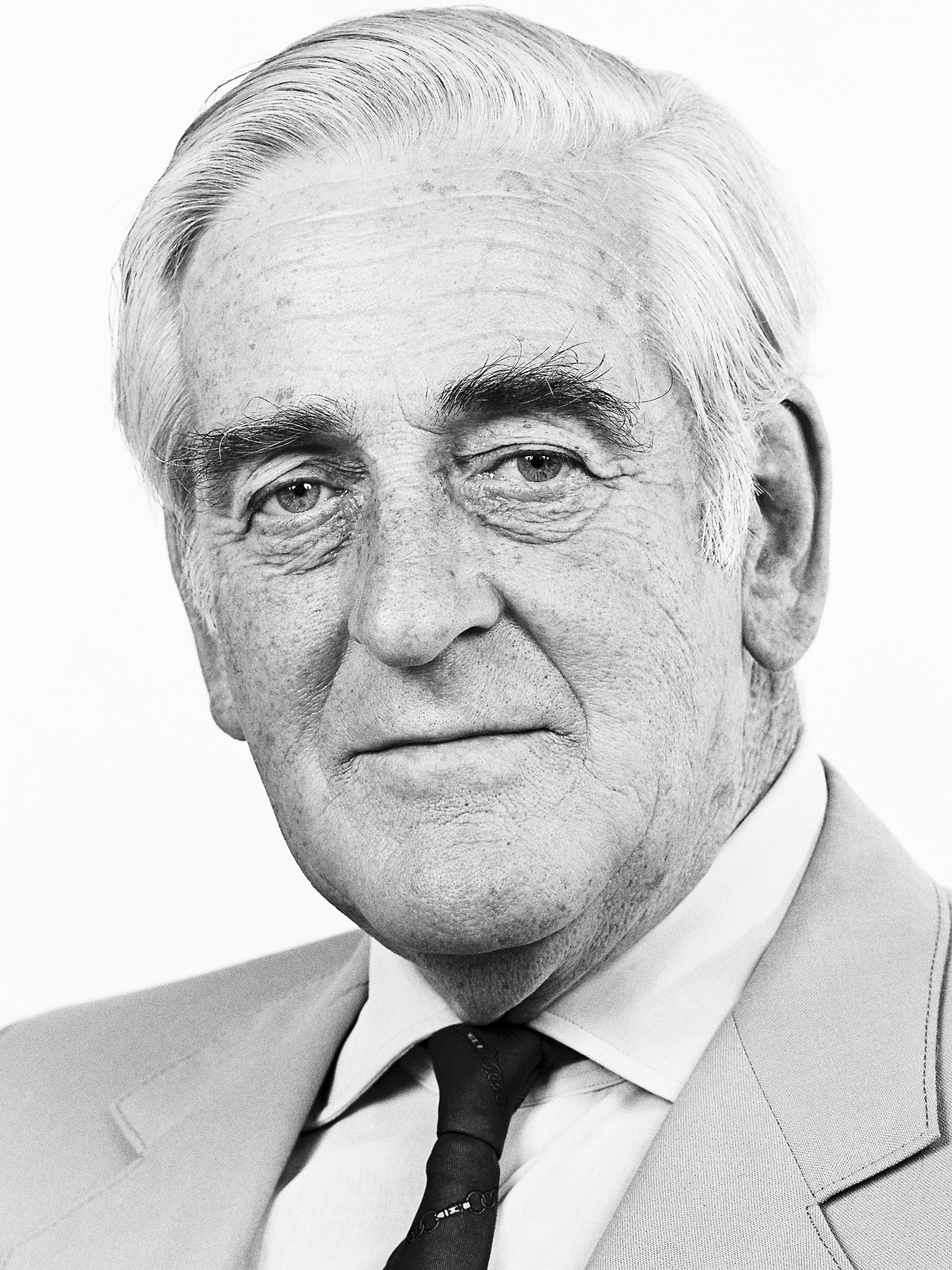

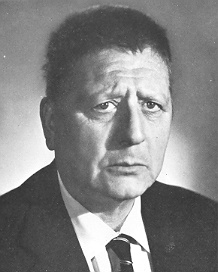

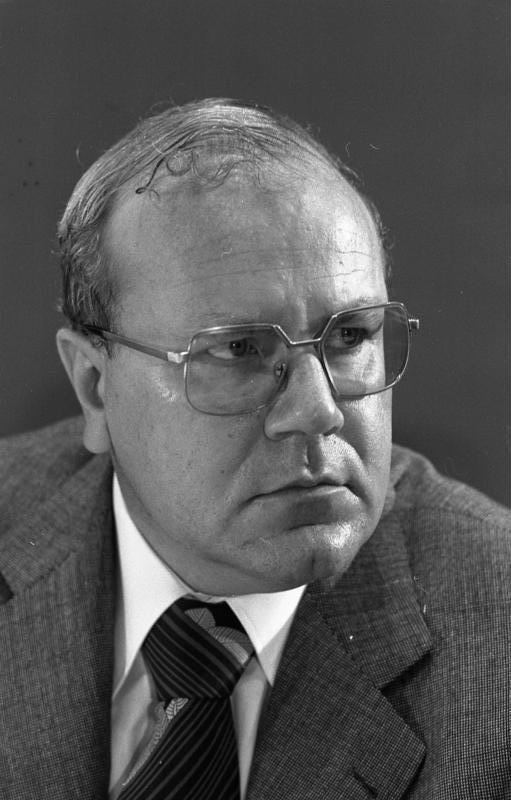

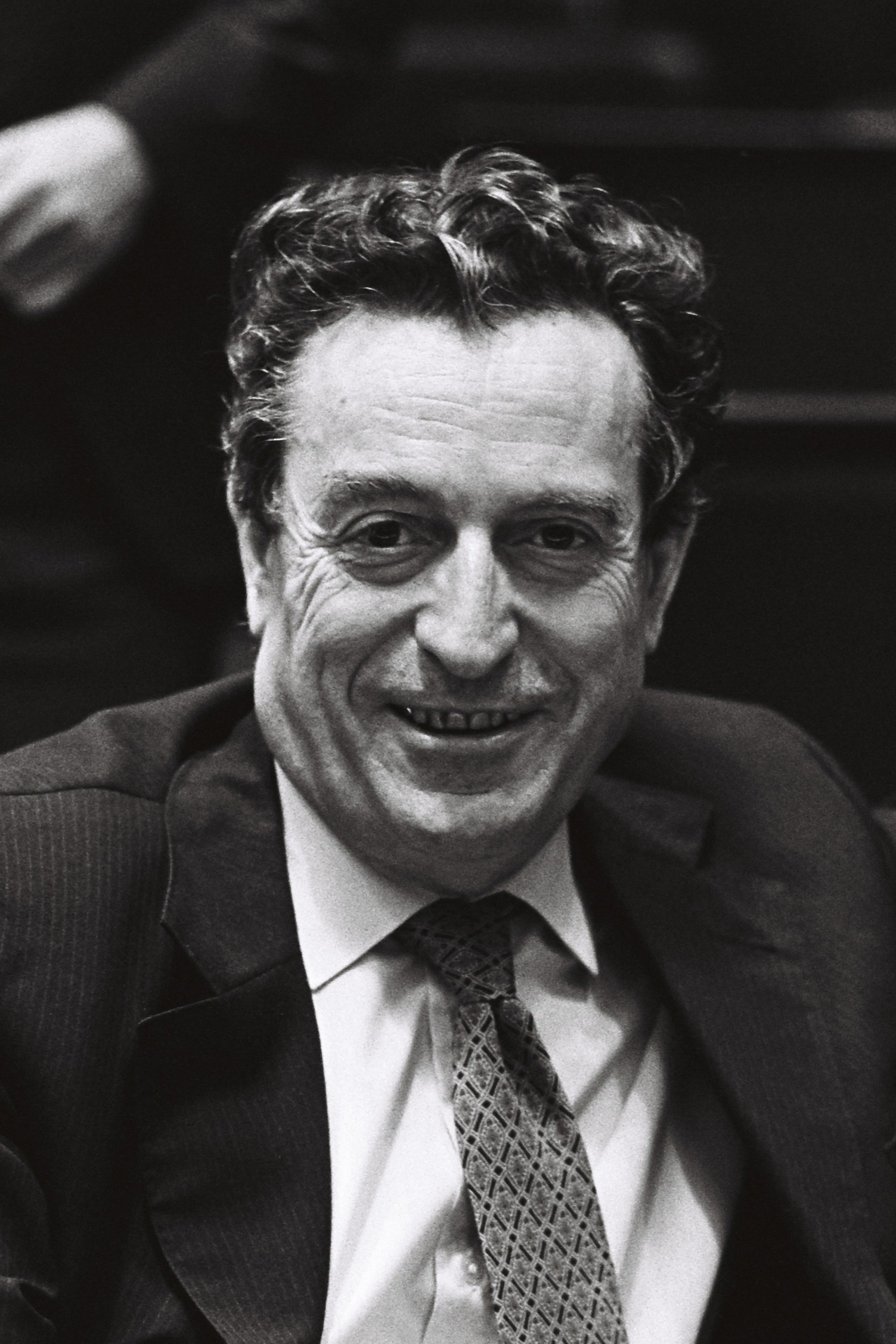
	First party	Second party	Third party
Leader	Ernest Glinne	Egon Klepsch	James Scott-Hopkins
Party	S&D	EPP	ED
Leader's seat	Belgium (French)	Germany	Hereford and Worcester
Seats won	113 / 410	107 / 410	64 / 410
Popular vote	29,530,418	31,355,631	6,878,970
Percentage	26.62%	28.26%	6.20%
	Fourth party	Fifth party	Sixth party
Leader	Giorgio Amendola	Martin Bangemann	Christian de La Malène
Party	COM	ELDR	EPD
Leader's seat	Central Italy	Germany	France
Seats won	44 / 410	40 / 410	22 / 410
Popular vote	14,908,281	11,520,616	4,114,969
Percentage	13.44%	10.38%	3.71%
- Post-election composition of each member state's delegation
President of the European Parliament
Simone Veil
ELDR

The 1979 European Parliament election was a series of parliamentary elections held across all 9 (at the time) European Community member states. They were the first European elections to be held, allowing citizens to elect 410 MEPs to the European Parliament, and also the first international election in history.

Seats in the Parliament had been allocated to the states according to population, and in some cases were divided into constituencies, but members sat according to political groups.

== Background ==
The Treaty of Rome which established the Communities specified that the European Parliament must be elected by universal suffrage using a common voting system. The Council of the European Union was responsible for setting up the elections but it had procrastinated. As a stop-gap measure, members were appointed to the Parliament by the member states from their own national parliaments, as they had done since the Common Assembly. The Parliament was unhappy with this and threatened to take the Council to the European Court of Justice. The Council eventually agreed to elections and the first European Parliament elections were held in 1979 after proposals were put forward in the mid-1970s. The issue of a common voting method was left undecided, and even to this day the voting methods vary from member state to member state, although all have used some form of proportional representation since 1999.

== Campaigns ==
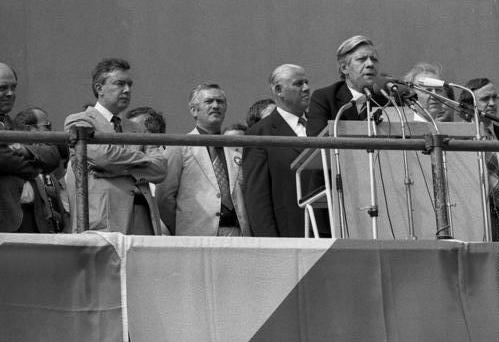
Helmut Schmidt on the campaign trail in 1979

The campaigns varied. The former Social Democrat German Chancellor Willy Brandt took an international campaign to France, Italy, Luxembourg and the Netherlands to boost the Socialist group. On the other hand, the former Prime Minister of France Jacques Chirac used the election to gauge his popularity against the then-President of France Valéry Giscard d'Estaing, in anticipation of a presidential bid in 1981.

== Election ==
In June, the 410 members were elected by universal suffrage. At the time there were no rules on the system of election to be used. The United Kingdom used a plurality voting system for multiple small constituencies in Great Britain but the other member states used proportional representation for fewer larger constituencies (usually the member state itself as a single constituency), albeit with different methods of seat allocation.

The electorate took little interest but average voter turnout was 63%. The lowest turn out was in the United Kingdom with 32.2%: all others were above 50% apart from Denmark. Aside from Belgium and Luxembourg, where voting is compulsory, the highest turnout was in Italy with 84.9%.

== Result ==
Socialist parties working together under the Europe-wide Confederation of Socialist Parties won the most seats: the resultant Socialist group had 113 MEPs. Christian Democrat parties united within the pan-European European People's Party came second, with the resultant group having 107 MEPs. The largest third force was the Conservative European Democrats with 64, followed by Communists with 44. The Liberal Democrats had 40 seats, although their candidate was elected as President.

The groups formed were loose coalitions based on the groups founded in previous years, but they soon became the basis for modern European political parties.

National distribution of seats
State	Seats	State	Seats
France	81	West Germany	81
Italy	81	United Kingdom	81
Netherlands	25	Belgium	24
Denmark	16	Ireland	15
Luxembourg	6		

Party or alliance		Votes	%	Seats
Group of the European People's Party (EPP)	Christian Democracy (Italy) (DC)	12,774,320	11.42	29
Group of the European People's Party (EPP)	Christian Democratic Union of Germany (CDU)	10,883,085	9.73	34
Group of the European People's Party (EPP)	Christian Social Union in Bavaria (CSU)	2,817,120	2.52	8
Group of the European People's Party (EPP)	Christian Democratic Appeal (CDA)	2,017,743	1.80	10
Group of the European People's Party (EPP)	Union for French Democracy (UDF)	1,851,460	1.66	8
Group of the European People's Party (EPP)	Christian People's Party (Flanders) (CVP)	1,607,941	1.44	7
Group of the European People's Party (EPP)	Christian Social Party (Wallonia) (PSC)	445,912	0.40	3
Group of the European People's Party (EPP)	Fine Gael	443,652	0.40	4
Group of the European People's Party (EPP)	Christian Social People's Party (Luxembourg) (CSV)	352,296	0.31	3
Group of the European People's Party (EPP)	South Tyrolean People's Party (SVP)	196,373	0.18	1
Group of the European People's Party (EPP)	Christian Democrats (Denmark)	30,985	0.03	0
Group of the European People's Party (EPP)	Total	33,420,887	29.88	107
Socialist Group (SOC)	Social Democratic Party of Germany (SPD)	11,370,045	10.17	35
Socialist Group (SOC)	Socialist Party (France) (PS) – Movement of Radicals of the Left (MRG)	4,763,026	4.26	22
Socialist Group (SOC)	Labour Party (UK)	4,253,247	3.80	17
Socialist Group (SOC)	Italian Socialist Party (PSI)	3,866,946	3.46	9
Socialist Group (SOC)	Labour Party (Netherlands) (PvdA)	1,722,240	1.54	9
Socialist Group (SOC)	Italian Democratic Socialist Party (PSDI)	1,514,272	1.35	4
Socialist Group (SOC)	Belgian Socialist Party (Flanders) (BSP)	698,889	0.62	3
Socialist Group (SOC)	Belgian Socialist Party (Wallonia) (PSB)	575,824	0.51	4
Socialist Group (SOC)	Social Democrats (Denmark)	382,487	0.34	3
Socialist Group (SOC)	Luxembourg Socialist Workers' Party (LSAP)	211,106	0.19	1
Socialist Group (SOC)	Labour Party (Ireland)	193,898	0.17	4
Socialist Group (SOC)	Social Democratic and Labour Party (SDLP)	140,622	0.13	1
Socialist Group (SOC)	Siumut	5,118	0.00	1
Socialist Group (SOC)	Total	29,697,720	26.55	113
Communists and Allies Group (COM)	Italian Communist Party (PCI)	10,361,344	9.26	24
Communists and Allies Group (COM)	French Communist Party (PCF)	4,153,710	3.71	19
Communists and Allies Group (COM)	Communist Party of Belgium (KPB/PCB)	145,796	0.13	0
Communists and Allies Group (COM)	German Communist Party (DKP)	112,055	0.10	0
Communists and Allies Group (COM)	Communist Party of the Netherlands (CPN)	97,343	0.09	0
Communists and Allies Group (COM)	Socialist People's Party (Denmark) (SF)	81,991	0.07	1
Communists and Allies Group (COM)	Communist Party of Luxembourg (KPL)	48,813	0.04	0
Communists and Allies Group (COM)	Total	15,001,052	13.41	44
Liberal and Democratic Group (LD)	Union for French Democracy (UDF)	3,815,524	3.41	17
Liberal and Democratic Group (LD)	Liberal Party (UK)	1,690,638	1.51	0
Liberal and Democratic Group (LD)	Free Democratic Party (Germany) (FDP)	1,662,621	1.49	4
Liberal and Democratic Group (LD)	Italian Liberal Party (PLI)	1,271,159	1.14	3
Liberal and Democratic Group (LD)	People's Party for Freedom and Democracy (VVD)	914,787	0.82	4
Liberal and Democratic Group (LD)	Italian Republican Party (PRI)	896,139	0.80	2
Liberal and Democratic Group (LD)	Party for Freedom and Progress (Flanders) (PVV)	512,363	0.46	2
Liberal and Democratic Group (LD)	Liberal Reformist Party (Wallonia) (PRL)	372,904	0.33	2
Liberal and Democratic Group (LD)	Democratic Party (Luxembourg) (DP)	274,307	0.25	2
Liberal and Democratic Group (LD)	Venstre (Denmark)	252,767	0.23	3
Liberal and Democratic Group (LD)	Thomas Joseph Maher (Independent from Ireland)	86,208	0.08	1
Liberal and Democratic Group (LD)	Total	11,749,467	10.50	40
European Democratic Group (ED)	Conservative Party (UK)	6,508,492	5.82	60
European Democratic Group (ED)	Conservative People's Party (Denmark) (DKF)	245,309	0.22	2
European Democratic Group (ED)	Ulster Unionist Party (UUP)	125,169	0.11	1
European Democratic Group (ED)	Centre Democrats (Denmark) (CD)	107,790	0.10	1
European Democratic Group (ED)	Total	6,986,760	6.25	64
Group of European Progressive Democrats (EPD)	Rally for the Republic (France) (RPR)	3,301,980	2.95	15
Group of European Progressive Democrats (EPD)	Fianna Fáil	464,451	0.42	5
Group of European Progressive Democrats (EPD)	Scottish National Party (SNP)	247,836	0.22	1
Group of European Progressive Democrats (EPD)	Progress Party (Denmark) (FrP)	100,702	0.09	1
Group of European Progressive Democrats (EPD)	Total	4,114,969	3.68	22
Group for the Technical Coordination and Defence of Independent Groups and Members (CDI)	Radical Party (Italy) (PR)	1,285,065	1.15	3
Group for the Technical Coordination and Defence of Independent Groups and Members (CDI)	Proletarian Unity Party (Italy) (PdUP)	406,656	0.36	1
Group for the Technical Coordination and Defence of Independent Groups and Members (CDI)	People's Movement against the EEC (Denmark)	365,760	0.33	4
Group for the Technical Coordination and Defence of Independent Groups and Members (CDI)	People's Union (Flanders) (VU)	324,540	0.29	1
Group for the Technical Coordination and Defence of Independent Groups and Members (CDI)	Proletarian Democracy (DP)	252,342	0.23	1
Group for the Technical Coordination and Defence of Independent Groups and Members (CDI)	Independent Fianna Fáil	81,522	0.07	1
Group for the Technical Coordination and Defence of Independent Groups and Members (CDI)	Total	2,715,885	2.43	11
Non-Inscrits (NI)	Italian Social Movement (MSI)	1,909,055	1.71	4
Non-Inscrits (NI)	Democrats 66 (D66)	511,967	0.46	2
Non-Inscrits (NI)	Democratic Front of Francophones–Walloon Rally (DéFI-RW)	414,603	0.37	2
Non-Inscrits (NI)	Democratic Unionist Party (DUP)	170,688	0.15	1
Non-Inscrits (NI)	Total	3,006,313	2.69	9
Other parties and independents		5,154,957	4.61	0
Total		111,847,960	100.00	410
Source: Belgian Elections, Folketingsårbog, France Politique, jcautran.free.fr, France Politique, ElectionsIreland.org, Irish Elections, Italian Ministry of the Interior, Public.lu, Kiesraad, UK Parliament Briefing, House of Commons Library, CAIN Archive, Federal Statistics Office, Wahlen-in-Deutschland.de, Europe Politique

1979 European Parliament election – Groups at 17 July 1979
Group	Description	Chaired by	MEPs	
SOC	Social Democrats	Ernest Glinne	113	
EPP	Christian Democrats	Egon Klepsch	107	
ED	Conservatives	James Scott-Hopkins	64	
COM	Communists and the Far Left	Giorgio Amendola	44	
LD	Liberals and Liberal Democrats	Martin Bangemann	40	
EPD	National Conservatives	Christian de La Malène	22	
CDI	Heterogeneous	Marco Pannella; Neil Blaney; Jens-Peter Bonde	11	
NI	Independents	none	9	Total: 410

Votes summary
EPP	29.88%
SOC	26.55%
COM	13.41%
LD	10.50%
ED	6.25%
EPD	3.68%
NI	2.69%
CDI	2.43%
Others	4.61%

Seats summary
SOC	27.56%
EPP	26.10%
ED	15.61%
COM	10.73%
LD	9.76%
EPD	5.37%
CDI	2.68%
NI	2.20%

=== Result by country ===
Group Nation	SOC	EPP	ED	COM	LD	EPD	CDI	NI	Total
Belgium	4 PS; 3 SP	7 CVP; 3 PSC			2 PVV; 2 PRL		1 VU	2 FDF	24
Denmark	3 A 1 Siu	1 D	2 C	1 SF	3 V	1 FP	4 N		16
France	22 PS+MRG	8 UDF		19 PCF	17 UDF	15 RPR			81
Ireland	4 LAB	4 FG			1 Ind.	5 FF	1 Ind. FF		15
Italy	9 PSI; 4 PSDI	29 DC; 1 SVP		24 PCI	3 PLI; 2 PRI		3 PR; 1 PdUP; 1 DP	4 MSI	81
Luxembourg	1 LSAP	3 CSV			2 DP				6
Netherlands	9 PvdA	10 CDA			4 VVD			2 D66	25
United Kingdom	17 LAB; 1 SDLP		60 CON; 1 UUP			1 SNP		1 DUP	81
West Germany	35 SPD	34 CDU; 8 CSU			4 FDP				81
Total	113	107	64	44	40	22	11	9	410

== Post election ==
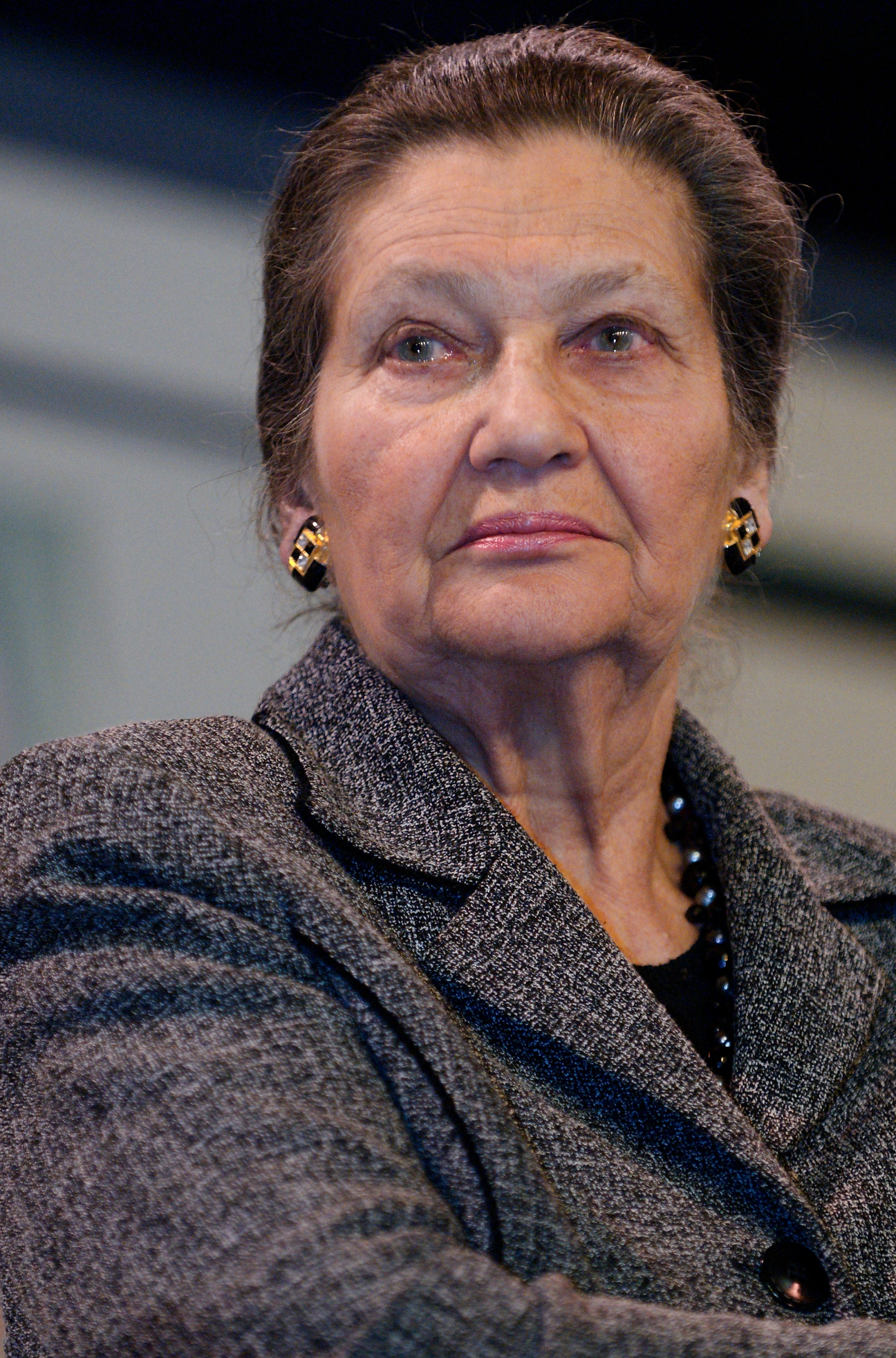
Simone Veil, elected as the first female President

Louise Weiss, who was born in 1893 and thus 86 at the time, was found to be Parliament's oldest member and hence presided over the chamber while the election of the President took place (July 1979). Before that could happen however, she immediately had to deal with Ian Paisley MEP who, in the first speech of the session, protested that the British flag outside the building was flying upside down. She dealt with the interruption swiftly. The confrontation was seen as one of her finest hours and she later confided that, as a grandmother, she was used to dealing with "recalcitrant youngsters".

There were five candidates for President of the European Parliament: Giorgio Amendola, Italian Communist; Emma Bonino, Italian Technical Independent; Christian de La Malène, French Progressive Democrat; Simone Veil, French Liberal, and Mario Zagari, Italian Socialist.

In the first ballot, Veil secured 183 of the 380 votes cast – eight short of the absolute majority needed. The next closest contender was Zagari with 118 votes, then Amendola with 44, de la Malène with 26 and Bonino with 9. Bonino and de la Malène dropped out and Veil secured an absolute majority in the second ballot with 192 of the 377 votes cast (Zagari gained 128 and Amendola 47). Veil was elected as the first President of the elected Parliament, and first female President of the Parliament since it was founded in 1952.

The following were elected as Vice-Presidents: Danielle De March, Basil de Ferranti, Bruno Friedrich, Guido Gonella, Gérard Jacquet, Hans Katzer, Poul Møller, Pierre Pflimlin, Bríd Rodgers, Marcel Albert Vandewiele, Anne Vondeling and Mario Zagari.

Previously the Parliament was a weak consultative assembly, the members of which were part-time. With the elections the new body of MEPs were full-time, energetic and more diverse. As soon as the Parliament was established the "old guard" MEPs of the larger parties sought to raise the bar at which a European Parliament political group could be formed (the status gave financial support and representation in committees). This move was quickly blocked by smaller groups working together and filibustering the proposal. The ties formed at this time laid the foundations of the Rainbow group: an alliance of left-wing and green parties which later became the European Greens–European Free Alliance group.

=== Statistics ===
European Parliament election, 1979 – Electoral map at 17 July 1979
European Parliament election, 1979 - electoral map
Key	Group	Description
	SOC	Social Democrats
	EPP	Christian Democrats
	ED	Conservatives
	COM	Communists and the Far Left
	LD	Liberals and Liberal Democrats
	EPD	National Conservatives
	CDI	Heterogeneous
	NI	Independents

European Parliament election, 1979 - Statistics
Area	Dates	Seats	Electorate	Turnout	Previous	Next	Election methods	Sources
European Community (EC-9)	7, 10 June 1979	410	191,783,528	63%	Inaugural	1981	All PR, except UK (not NI) which used FPTP	

European Parliament election, 1979 - Timeline
Appointed Parliament		1979 Election		Regrouping		First Parliament	
Groups	Pre-elections 13 February 1978	Change	Results 7 July	Change	Results 17 July	New Groups	First session 17 July
SOC	63	+48	111	+2	113	SOC	113
CD	52	+54	106	+1	107	EPP	107
C	18	+45	63	+1	64	ED	64
COM	17	+27	44	+0	44	COM	44
LD	24	+17	41	-1	40	LD	40
EPD	19	+2	21	+1	22	EPD	22
NI	3	+21	24	+11	11	CDI	11
NI	3	+21	24	-15	9	NI	9
Total	196	+214	410	+0	410	Total	410

European Parliament election, 1979 - Delegation at 17 July 1979
Group	Description	Details	%	MEPs
SOC	Social Democrats	West Germany 35, Belgium 7, Denmark 4, France 22, Ireland 4, Italy 13, Luxembourg 1, Netherlands 9, UK 18	28%	113
EPP	Christian Democrats	West Germany 42, Belgium 10, France 8, Ireland 4, Italy 30, Luxembourg 3, Netherlands 10	26%	107
ED	Conservatives	Denmark 3, UK 61	16%	64
COM	Communists and the Far Left	Denmark 1, France 19, Italy 24	11%	44
LD	Liberals and Liberal Democrats	West Germany 4, Belgium 4, Denmark 3, France 17, Ireland 1, Italy 5, Luxembourg 2, Netherlands 4	10%	40
EPD	National Conservatives	Denmark 1, France 15, Ireland 5, UK 1	5%	22
CDI	Heterogeneous	Belgium 1, Denmark 4, Ireland 1, Italy 5	3%	11
NI	Independents	Belgium 2, Italy 4, Netherlands 2, UK 1	2%	9

European Parliament election, 1979 - Votes by national party at unknown 1979 date
Country	Party	Abbr.	Group	Votes	% (nat.)	Seats
Italy	Christian Democracy	DC	EPP	12,753,708	36.45	29
West Germany	Social Democratic Party of Germany	SPD	SOC	11,370,045	40.83	35
West Germany	Christian Democratic Union	CDU	EPP	10,883,085	39.08	34
Italy	Italian Communist Party	PCI	COM	10,345,284	29.57	24
United Kingdom	Conservative Party	CP	ED	6,508,493	48.40	60
France	Union for French Democracy	UDF	LD	5,666,984	27.87	25
France	Socialist Party – Movement of Left Radicals	PS-MRG	SOC	4,763,026	23.43	22
United Kingdom	Labour Party	LP	SOC	4,253,207	31.63	17
France	French Communist Party	PCF	COM	4,153,710	20.43	19
Italy	Italian Socialist Party	PSI	SOC	3,858,295	11.03	9
France	Rally for the Republic	RPR	EPD	3,301,980	16.24	15
West Germany	Christian Social Union of Bavaria	CSU	EPP	2,817,120	10.12	8
Netherlands	Christian Democratic Appeal	CDA	EPP	2,017,743	35.60	10
Italy	Italian Social Movement	MSI	NI	1,907,880	5.45	4
Netherlands	Labour Party	PvdA	SOC	1,722,240	30.39	9
United Kingdom	Liberal Party	L		1,691,531	12.58	
West Germany	Free Democratic Party	FDP	LD	1,662,621	5.97	4
Belgium	Christian People's Party	CVP	EPP	1,607,941	29.54	7
Italy	Italian Democratic Socialist Party	PSDI	SOC	1,512,425	4.32	4
Italy	Radical Party	PR	CDI	1,283,512	3.67	3
Italy	Italian Liberal Party	PLI	LD	1,270,152	3.63	3
Netherlands	People's Party for Freedom and Democracy	VVD	LD	914,787	16.14	4
Italy	Italian Republican Party	PRI	LD	895,558	2.56	2
West Germany	The Greens	GRÜNE		893,683	3.21	
France	Ecological Europe	VERTS		891,683	4.39	
Belgium	Socialist Party	SP	SOC	698,889	12.84	3
France	Workers' Struggle – Revolutionary Communist League	LO-LCR		623,663	3.07	
Belgium	Socialist Party	PS	SOC	575,824	10.58	4
Belgium	Party for Freedom and Progress	PVV	LD	512,363	9.41	2
Netherlands	Democracy 66	D66	NI	511,967	9.03	2
Ireland	Fianna Fáil	FF	EPD	464,451	34.68	5
Belgium	Christian Social Party	PSC	EPP	445,912	8.19	3
Ireland	Fine Gael	FG	EPP	443,652	33.13	4
Belgium	Democratic Front of Francophones	FDF	NI	414,603	7.62	2
Italy	Proletarian Unity Party	PdUP	CDI	406,007	1.16	1
Denmark	Social Democrats	S	SOC	382,487	21.80	3
France	5th List: Employment. Equality. Europe	5-EEE		373,259	1.84	
Belgium	Liberal Reformist Party	PRL	LD	372,904	6.85	2
Denmark	People's Movement against the EU	FolkeB	CDI	365,760	20.85	4
Luxembourg	Christian Social People's Party	CSV	EPP	352,296	36.12	3
Belgium	People's Union	VU	CDI	324,540	5.96	1
France	Inter-Professional Union for an Independent France in a Solidary Europe	UDIP-FIDES		290,555	1.43	
Luxembourg	Democratic Party	DP	LD	274,307	28.12	2
France	Party of New Forces	PFN		265,911	1.31	
Denmark	Venstre	V	LD	252,767	14.41	3
Italy	Proletarian Democracy	DP	CDI	251,927	0.72	1
United Kingdom	Scottish National Party	SNP	EPD	247,836	1.84	1
Denmark	Conservative People's Party	KF	EPP	245,309	13.98	2
Luxembourg	Luxembourg Socialist Workers' Party	LSAP	SOC	211,106	21.64	1
Italy	South Tyrolean People's Party	SVP	EPP	196,277	0.56	1
Ireland	Irish Labour Party	ILP	SOC	193,898	14.48	4
Ireland	Independents	Ind.	NI	189,499	14.15	2
United Kingdom	Democratic Unionist Party	DUP	NI	170,688	1.27	1
Italy	Valdostan Union – Sardinian Action Party	UV-PSd'Az		166,194	0.47	
Belgium	Communist Party of Belgium	PCB-KPB		145,796	2.68	
Italy	National Democracy	DN		142,354	0.41	
United Kingdom	Social Democratic and Labour Party	SDLP	SOC	140,622	1.05	1
Netherlands	Reformed Political Party	SGP		126,412	2.23	
United Kingdom	Ulster Unionist Party	UUP	ED	125,169	0.93	1
United Kingdom	Independents	Ind.		112,366	N/A	
West Germany	German Communist Party	DKP		112,055	0.40	
Belgium	Confederated Ecologists	ECOLO		107,833	1.98	
Denmark	Centre Democrats	CD	ED	107,790	6.14	1
Denmark	Progressive Party	FP	EPD	100,702	5.74	1
Netherlands	Communist Party of the Netherlands	CPN		97,343	1.72	
Netherlands	Pacifist Socialist Party	PSP		97,243	1.72	
Netherlands	Political Party of Radicals	PPR		92,055	1.62	
United Kingdom	Plaid Cymru	PC		83,399	0.62	
Denmark	Socialist People's Party	SF	COM	81,991	4.67	1
Belgium	Another way of Living	AGALEV		77,986	1.43	
Luxembourg	Social Democratic Party	SDP		68,289	7.00	
Netherlands	Reformed Political League	GPV		62,610	1.10	
Denmark	Justice League	DR		60,954	3.47	
Denmark	Left Socialists	VS		59,379	3.38	
Denmark	Radical Left	RV		56,944	3.25	
Luxembourg	Communist Party of Luxembourg	KPL		48,813	5.00	
Belgium	All Power to the Workers	TPO-AMADA		45,423	0.83	
West Germany	Christian Bavarian People's Party	CBV		45,311	0.16	
Ireland	Sinn Féin – The Workers Party	SFWP		43,942	3.28	
United Kingdom	Alliance Party of Northern Ireland	A		39,026	0.29	
Belgium	Flemish People's Party	VVP		34,706	0.64	
West Germany	European Workers Party	EAP		31,822	0.11	
West Germany	German Centre Party	ZENTRUM		31,367	0.11	
Denmark	Christian People's Party	KrF		30,985	1.77	
United Kingdom	United Against the Common Market	UACM		27,506	N/A	
Netherlands	Leschot List	LL		24,903	0.44	
Belgium	E-NON	E-NON		22,187	0.41	
United Kingdom	Ecology Party	EP		17,953	0.13	
Belgium	PLW-PLE	PLW-PLE		17,566	0.32	
Belgium	Workers Revolutionary League	LRT-RAL		16,911	0.31	
United Kingdom	Mebyon Kernow	MK		10,205	N/A	
Luxembourg	Alternative List	AL		9,845	1.01	
Belgium	PPB	PPB		9,704	0.18	
Belgium	PFU	PFU		7,273	0.13	
United Kingdom	United Labour Party	ULP		6,122	1.1	
Luxembourg	Liberal Party	LP		5,610	0.58	
Luxembourg	Revolutionary Socialist Party	RSP		5,085	0.52	
Belgium	POE	POE		4,617	0.08	
United Kingdom	Workers' Party	WP		4,418	0.8	
United Kingdom	Unionist Party of Northern Ireland	UPNI		3,712	0.6	
Ireland	CDI	CDI		3,630	0.27	
United Kingdom	International Marxist Group	IMG		1,635	N/A	
United Kingdom	Ulster Liberal Party	ULP		932	0.2	
United Kingdom	EFP	EFP		497	N/A	
France	Europe – Self-Management List	PSU		382	0.00	
France	Regions-Europe	RE		337	0.00	

== See also ==
- List of members of the European Parliament (1979–1984)
- History of the European Communities (1973–93)
- Eurodroite
