= 1989 European Parliament election =

- 15–18 June 1989

All 518 seats to the European Parliament 260 seats needed for a majority
- Turnout: 58.5% ▼2.5 pp
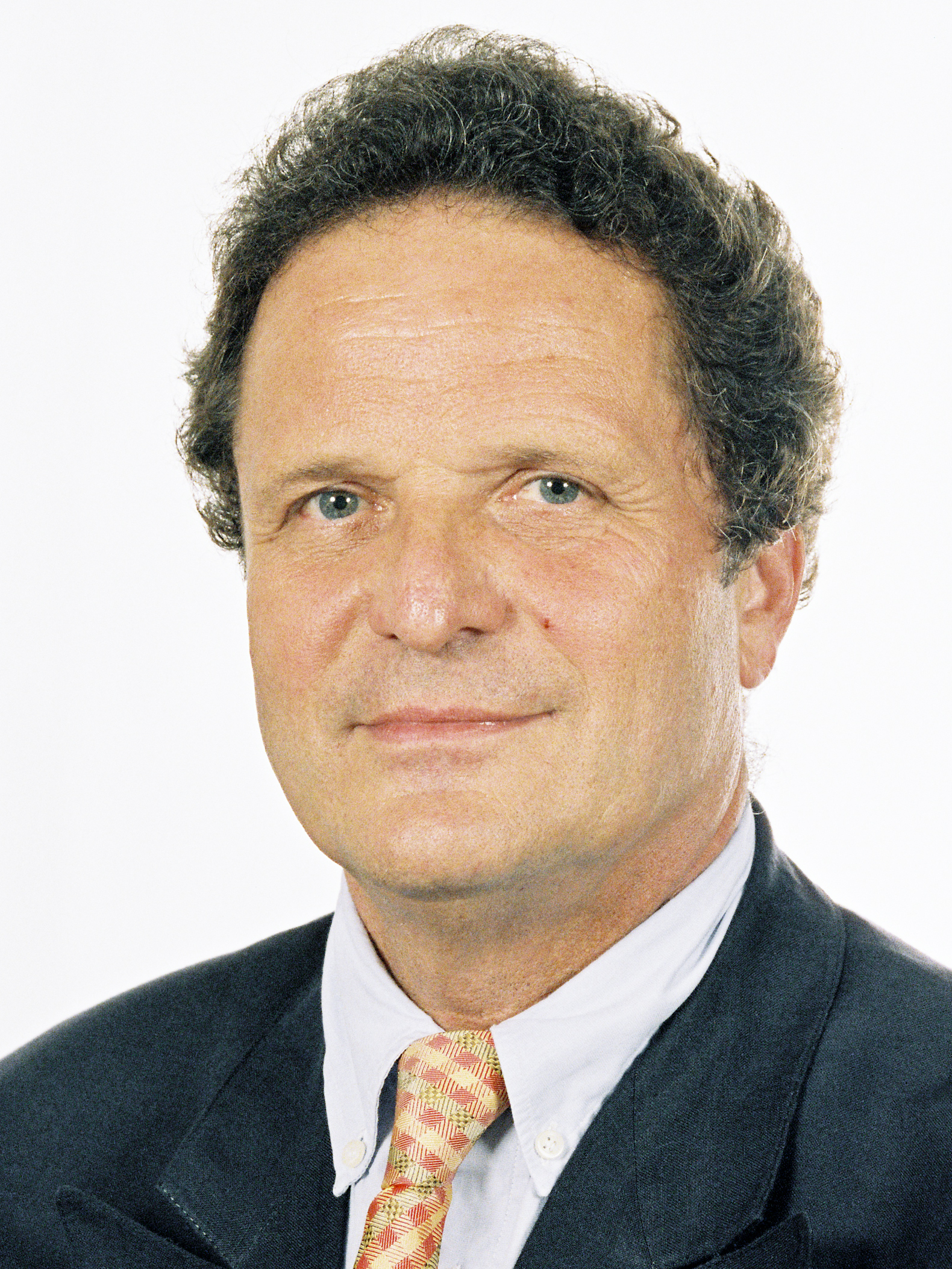

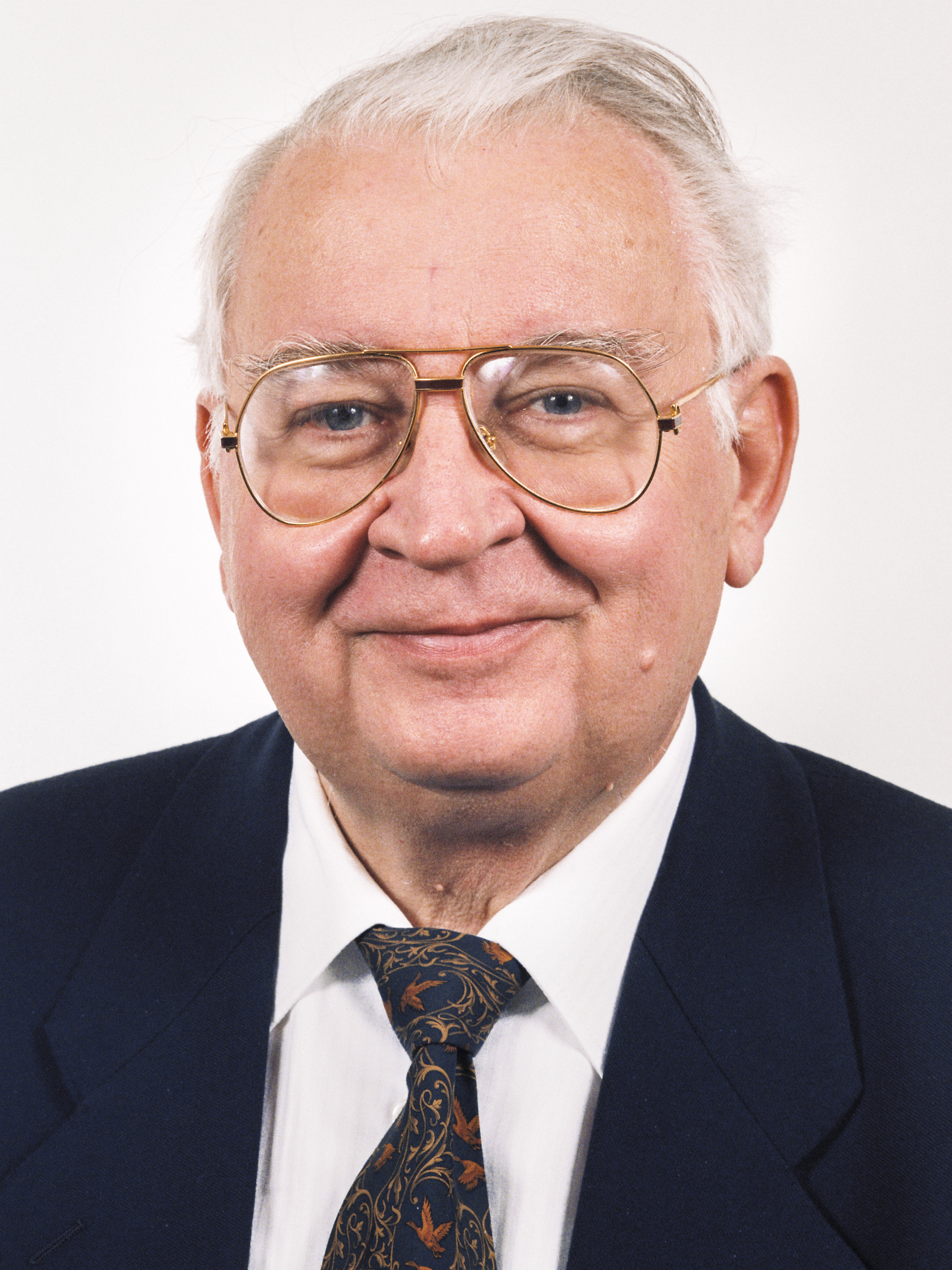

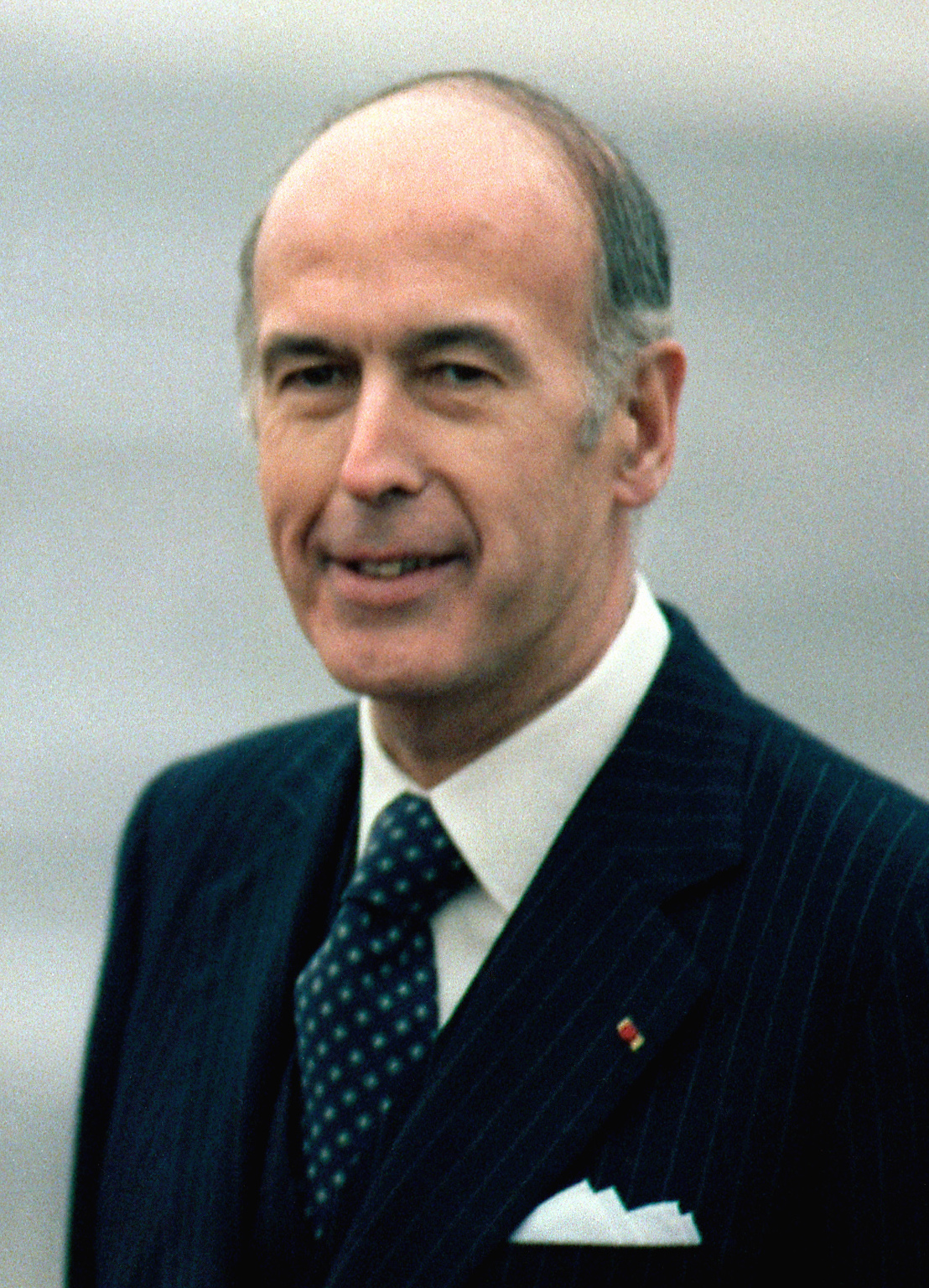
| | First party | Second party | Third party |
|---|---|---|---|
| Leader | Jean-Pierre Cot | Egon Klepsch | Valéry Giscard d’Estaing |
| Party | SOC | EPP | ELDR |
| Leader's seat | France | Germany | France |
| Last election | 130 | 110 | 31 |
| Seats won | 180* | 121* | 49* |
| Seat change | ▲50 | ▲11 | ▲18 |
- Post-election composition of each member state's delegation * The number of seats was increased from 434 to 518 – so this is a nominal figure
President of the European Parliament before election
Henry Plumb
ED
President of the European Parliament after election
Enrique Barón Crespo
PES

The 1989 European Parliament election was held on Wednesday June 15 to Sunday June 18 across the 12 European Union member states. It was the third European Parliament election but the first time that Spain and Portugal voted at the same time as the other members they joined in 1986. Overall turnout dropped to 59%.

== Electoral system ==
There was no single voting system for all member states but each of them adopted its own method, established by national law.

The United Kingdom used a one-round (first-past-the-post) system of 78 constituencies in England, Wales and Scotland, while in Northern Ireland 3 proportional seats were allocated. Belgium, Ireland and Italy used a proportional system with subdivision of the territory into constituencies. Denmark, France, West Germany, Greece, Luxembourg, the Netherlands, Portugal and Spain used a single national proportional system, although in the case of West Germany the three seats for the West Berlin area were not directly elected but were chosen by the Berlin House of Representatives, given the particular status of the city.

== Seat changes ==
These were the first elections Portugal and Spain took part in with the other states. Spain was allocated 60 seats and Portugal was allocated 24; the number of seats for the other states remained the same, raising the total number of seats from 434 to 518.

National distribution of seats
| State | Seats | State | Seats |
|---|---|---|---|
| West Germany | 81 | Belgium | 24 |
| United Kingdom | 81 | Portugal | 24 |
| France | 81 | Greece | 24 |
| Italy | 81 | Denmark | 16 |
| Spain | 60 | Ireland | 15 |
| Netherlands | 25 | Luxembourg | 6 |

== Results ==
European Parliament election, 1989 - Final results at 25 July 1989
| Group | Description | Chaired by | MEPs | | |
|---|---|---|---|---|---|
| SOC | Social Democrats | Jean-Pierre Cot | 180 | | |
| EPP | Christian Democrats | Egon Klepsch | 121 | | |
| LDR | Liberals and Liberal Democrats | Valéry Giscard d'Estaing | 49 | | |
| ED | Conservatives | Christopher Prout | 34 | | |
| G | Greens | Maria Amélia Santos | 30 | | |
| EUL | Democratic Socialists | Luigi Alberto Colajanni | 28 | | |
| EDA | National Conservatives | Christian de La Malène | 20 | | |
| DR | Far-Right Nationalists | Jean-Marie Le Pen | 17 | | |
| LU | Communists and the Far Left | René-Emile Piquet | 14 | | |
| RBW | Regionalists | Jaak Vandemeulebroucke | 13 | | |
| NI | Independents | none | 12 | Total: 518 | Sources: |

The Socialists held their third consecutive victory, rising to 180 seats (166 pre-election), with the People's Party managing to win only 8 extra seats. However, the European Democrats had a massive loss of 32 of the 66 seats, knocking them from third to sixth largest party. The liberals, who had already risen one place with the byelections in Spain and Portugal earlier, gained an extra seat, holding their new-found third place with both the Rainbow and Communist groups splitting post-election.

Seats summary
| SOC | 34.75% |
| EPP | 23.36% |
| LDR | 9.46% |
| ED | 6.56% |
| G | 5.79% |
| EUL | 5.41% |
| EDA | 3.86% |
| DR | 3.28% |
| LU | 2.70% |
| RBW | 2.51% |
| NI | 2.32% |

=== Results by country ===
| Group Nation | SOC | EPP | LDR | ED | EDA | G | EUL | DR | LU | RBW | NI | Total |
|---|---|---|---|---|---|---|---|---|---|---|---|---|
| Belgium | 5 PS; 3 SP | 5 CVP; 2 PSC | 2 PVV; 2 PRL | | | 2 Ecolo; 1 Agalev | | 1 VB | | 1 VU | | 24 |
| Denmark | 4 A | 2 D | 3 V | 2 C | | | 1 SF | | | 4 N | | 16 |
| France | 22 PS | 4 CDS; 1 CNI; 1 Ind. | 12 UDF; 1 UDF diss. | | 12 RPR; 1 CNI | 8 Verts | | 10 FN | 7 PCF | 1 UPC | 1 Ind. | 81 |
| Greece | 9 PASOK | 10 ND | | | 1 DIANA | | 1 Synaspismos | | 3 Synaspismos | | | 24 |
| Ireland | 1 LAB | 4 FG | 1 PDs; 1 Ind. | | 6 FF | | | | 1 WPI | 1 Ind. | | 15 |
| Italy | 12 PSI; 2 PSDI | 26 DC; 1 SVP | 3 PRI | | | 3 LV; 2 VA; 1 DP; 1 LA | 22 PCI | | | 2 LL; 1 PSd'Az | 4 MSI; 1 Ind. | 81 |
| Luxembourg | 2 LSAP | 3 CSV | 1 DP | | | | | | | | | 6 |
| Netherlands | 8 PvdA | 10 CDA | 3 VVD; 1 D66 | | | 2 Regenboog | | | | | 1 SGP | 25 |
| Portugal | 8 PS | 3 CDS–PP | 9 PSD | | | 1 CDU (PEV) | | | 3 CDU (PCP) | | | 24 |
| Spain | 27 PSOE | 15 PP; 1 CiU (UDC) | 5 CDS; 1 CiU (CDC) | | | 1 IP | 4 IU | | | 1 PA; 1 PEP | 2 Ruiz-Mateos; 1 CN; 1 HB | 60 |
| United Kingdom | 45 LAB; 1 SDLP | 1 UUP | | 32 CON | | | | | | 1 SNP | 1 DUP | 81 |
| West Germany | 31 SPD | 25 CDU; 7 CSU | 4 FDP | | | 8 Grünen | | 6 REP | | | | 81 |
| Total | 180 | 121 | 49 | 34 | 20 | 30 | 28 | 17 | 14 | 13 | 12 | 518 |

=== Statistics ===
European Parliament election, 1989 - Statistics
| Area | Dates | Seats | Electorate | Turnout | Previous | Next | Election methods | Sources |
|---|---|---|---|---|---|---|---|---|
| European Community (EC-12) | 15-18 June 1989 | 518 | 244,951,379 | 58.5% | 1984 | 1994 | All PR, except UK (not NI) which used FPTP | |

European Parliament election, 1989 - Timeline
| Second Parliament | | 1989 Election and Regrouping | | Third Parliament | |
| Groups | Pre-elections Last session | Change | Results July 25 | New Groups | First session July 25 |
|---|---|---|---|---|---|
| SOC | 166 | +14 | 180 | SOC | 180 |
| EPP | 112 | +9 | 121 | EPP | 121 |
| LDR | 46 | +3 | 49 | LDR | 49 |
| RBW | 20 | +23 | 13 | RBW | 13 |
| RBW | 20 | +23 | 30 | G | 30 |
| COM | 48 | -6 | 28 | EUL | 28 |
| COM | 48 | -6 | 14 | LU | 14 |
| ED | 66 | -32 | 34 | ED | 34 |
| EDA | 30 | -10 | 20 | EDA | 20 |
| ER | 16 | +1 | 17 | DR | 17 |
| NI | 14 | -2 | 12 | NI | 12 |
| Total | 518 | 0 | 518 | Total | 518 |

European Parliament election, 1989 - Delegation at 25 July 1989
| Group | Description | Details | % | MEPs |
|---|---|---|---|---|
| SOC | Social Democrats | West Germany 31, Belgium 8, Denmark 4, France 22, Ireland 1, Italy 14, Luxembourg 2, Netherlands 8, UK 46, Greece 9, Spain 27, Portugal 8 | 35% | 180 |
| EPP | Christian Democrats | West Germany 32, Belgium 7, Denmark 2, France 6, Ireland 4, Italy 27, Luxembourg 3, Netherlands 10, UK 1, Greece 10, Spain 16, Portugal 3 | 23% | 121 |
| LDR | Liberals and Liberal Democrats | West Germany 4, Belgium 4, Denmark 3, France 13, Ireland 2, Italy 3, Luxembourg 1, Netherlands 4, Spain 6, Portugal 9 | 9% | 49 |
| ED | Conservatives | Denmark 2, UK 32 | 7% | 34 |
| G | Greens | West Germany 8, Belgium 3, France 8, Italy 7, Netherlands 2, Spain 1, Portugal 1 | 6% | 30 |
| EUL | Democratic Socialists | Denmark 1, Italy 22, Greece 1, Spain 4 | 5% | 28 |
| EDA | National Conservatives | France 13, Ireland 6, Greece 1 | 4% | 20 |
| DR | Far-Right Nationalists | West Germany 6, Belgium 1, France 10 | 3% | 17 |
| LU | Communists and the Far Left | France 7, Ireland 1, Greece 3, Portugal 3 | 3% | 14 |
| RBW | Regionalists | Belgium 1, Denmark 4, France 1, Ireland 1, Italy 3, UK 1, Spain 2 | 3% | 13 |
| NI | Independents | France 1, Italy 5, Netherlands 1, UK 1, Spain 4 | 2% | 12 |
| Sources: | | | 100% | 518 |
