= Radio University (Italy) =

Local Italian radio station

- Milan; Italy
- Broadcast area: Lombardy
- Frequency: 89.5 MHz

Programming
- Language: Italian

History
- Founded: 1976
- Last air date: 1986

Radio University (with an English original name) was a radio station in Milan, Italy, which was operating in the late 1970s mainly as a voice for the country's right and extreme right.

== Background ==
Following the Allied victory in World War II and the fall of the fascist regime in Italy, any attempt to revive the fascist party was explicitly forbidden by the new constitution of the country. (Note: A provision amplified and delineated in Italian legislation through the passing of law 645 in 1952, the so-called "Scelba law". It sanctions any conduct that could contribute to the re-establishment or the re-organization of the fascist party, along with any apologia for fascism and public fascist demonstrations. See Gatti (2024).) The constitutional and legislative prohibition was never completely enforced; only a few years after the war, periodicals and other print media appeared carrying on, in varying degrees of openness, the fascist credo of the recent past. The state prosecuted a few small neo-fascist groups, but the larger one, the Italian Social Movement (MSI), which was founded as early as in 1946, remained unaffected. In May 1952, the Secolo d'Italia newspaper was born, and became the main voice of the Italian far right, introducing nationalist and anti-communist perspectives into public discourse; it was founded by a former official of Mussolini's party and eventually taken under MSI's ownership. (Note: Secolo d'Italia reached a daily circulation of 150 thousand in the 1970s.)

In the post-war period, the Italian state maintained, through its ownership of RAI, exclusive control over radio and television broadcasting until the mid-1970s. In 1975, the parliament voted Law 103, the Italian Broadcasting Act, which reformed the country's state media system and transferred oversight of RAI from the government to the parliament, a move ostensibly towards "ideological balance." The new legislation and the several court rulings that followed allowed the creation of private, local, television and radio transmissions, introducing the public's right of access to diverse political, cultural, and social voices.

In the 1960s, after a series of strikes and protests, including the protests against the perceived acceptance of MSI by the conservative political mainstream, and the frequent expressions of radicalism, such as street violence, Italian politics were polarized. The tension, despite efforts of rapprochement, degenerated into armed conflict in the streets between extremists from both sides, acts of sabotage and assassination, and violence by and against the police. (Note: See Years of lead (Italy))

In the 1970s, after the legislative liberalization of airwaves, political militants, mainly of the Left, began to use the radio for the dissemination of ideological analysis and positions. Radio stations of the left, such as Rome's Città Futura and Bologna's Radio Città and Radio Alice, attracted an audience of significant size. Many people from their staff went on later to work in mainstream media. Famed anti-mafia activist Giuseppe Impastato, subsequently assassinated, began as the founder of Radio Aut. In the same period, radio stations expressing the far right's ideology appeared, such as Rome's Radio Gamma and Radio Contro, and Milan's Radio Alternativa and Radio University. (Note: Armed attacks by extremists against the opposition's radio stations were not infrequent. In 1979, NAR gunmen invaded Rome's Radio Città Futura station, set fire to the premises, and severely wounded its hosts. See Bomba et al (2022).)

== History ==
The notion of a nationalist radio in Milan was proposed in a December 1975 meeting of members of MSI's youth section Fronte della Gioventù and the nationalist students' organization FUAN or Fronte universitario d'azione nazionale. Far-right militants Teodoro Buontempo, subsequently a prominent MSI cadre and MP, and Ignazio La Russa, MSI cadre who went on to become president of the Italian Senate, were among the proponents. Buontempo had previously, in 1968, created a small, clandestine, nationalist and short-lived radio station.

Radio University began broadcasting from the studio of neo-fascist militant Franco Servello, (Note: On 12 April 12, 1973, Franco Servello helped organize and participated in a neo-fascist demonstration, banned by the Milanese law enforcement authorities, which resulted in violent clashes with the police, and the killing of police officer Antonio Marino. See Black Thursday.) at 1, Mancini street. Servello's wife, Donatella, acted as studio manager, managing the needs of the establishment and the personnel; at the beginning, all staff were unpaid volunteers and recruits, while security was non-existent, with people coming in to visit or meet at the studio without even a password at the door.

Promotional pamphlet. The upper line reads: "To Say What the Regime Does Not Say." The line at lower-right reads: "The sound of your free voice."

The station was the first to broadcast the anti-state songs of far-right artists, such as the music of singer-songwriter Fabrizio Marzi, of the groups Amici del Vento, La compagnia dell'anello, and Zeta Pi Emme. Journalist Walter Pancini, host of political and musical programs at the station, dabbled as author of popular books of fantasy and science fiction, as well as acting as stage presenter in the far right's Hobbit Camps. Radio University's program aimed for a wide audience. It featured hourly news reportage, weekly news shows of which the most popular was Periscopio, children's and sports programs, music shows that accepted listeners' requests and dedications, and even a criminology show hosted by a San Vittore Prison director. During Pope Paul VI's address to the faithful in Milan's Piazza Cinque Giornate, Radio University carried a live broadcast by reporter Maurizio Gussoni, who used a CB radio.

To meet the demands borne from the expansion of its reach, the station moved its studio to the larger premises of 5 Benvenuto Cellini street. It also opened a branch in Pavia, called Radio University 2, broadcasting from the city's headquarters of the Fronte della Gioventù. The Pavia branch, led by Carlo Nola, would record two hours of program each day and physically bring the tapes to Milan every morning. Pavia proved a successful expansion and a third local unit, Radio University 3, opened in Lecco, transmitting on the 92.700 MHz frequency.

Concurrent with the success of Radio University, various right-wing radio stations appeared, such as Radio Europa Sud in Como, Radio In in Perugia, Radio Mantakas in Fermo, (Note: Named after Greek neofascist militant Mikis Mantakas, assassinated in Rome in 1975.) Radio Conero in Ancona, Radio Odissea in Naples, Radio Excalibur in Bologna, and Radio Occidente in Palermo.

== Decline and legacy ==
In the early 1980s, neo-fascist and MSI militant Pino Rauti's fortnightly magazine Linea organized a meeting of right-wing radio stations' representatives, aimed to address the adverse financial conditions of their medium. The meeting in Rome attempted to formulate a right-wing radio network, with a large, common production center and a centralized distribution of programs. The project, though initiated with confident optimism, did not progress since, soon after, many stations began closing due to their insurmountable financial problems, as well as some founders' disaffection, or the gradual and inevitable cross-over to commercial radio. In the late 1980s, Radio University's frequency, by then subject to constant shutdowns, was acquired by the owners of Radio 105 and Radio Monte Carlo.

Most members of the Radio University staff moved into political agitation and militancy, such as Massimo Turci, while others abandoned politics altogether, such as Maurizio Gussoni, who went on to serve as vice president of Lombardy's Regional Communications Committee.

As the originally created right-wing stations closed, others emerged. Stefano Benedetti, Bruno Quieti, Andrea Guidi, and Giuseppe Poggi founded and financed Radio Delta 1 in Massa, Tuscany. Delta 1's broadcast was "particularly inflammatory" in its political and ideological content, to the extent that MSI regional director Marco Cellai, instructed by party leader Giorgio Almirante, closed it down.

Οn the Italian radio's 2024 centenary celebration, the president of the Senate Ignazio La Russa, member of the Brothers of Italy party and former MSI militant, saluted as proof of social liberty in Italy the 1970s birth of right-wing radio, and especially of Radio University.

== See also ==
- Far-right politics in Italy
- Post-fascism in Italy
- Candido
