= European Right (1984–1989) =

Former far-right political group of the European Parliament

Group of the European Right
- European Parliament group
- Name: Group of the European Right
- English abbr.: ER
- French abbr.: DR
- Formal name: Group of the European Right
- Ideology: Neo-fascism; Euroscepticism
- Political position: Far-right
- From: 24 July 1984
- To: 24 July 1989
- Preceded by: Eurodroite
- Succeeded by: Technical Group of the European Right
- Chaired by: Jean-Marie Le Pen
- MEP(s): 16 (24 July 1984)

The Group of the European Right (French: Groupe des droites européennes, abbr. DR) was a far-right political group that operated in the European Parliament between 1984 and 1989. It was led by the neo-fascist National Front of Jean-Marie Le Pen. Its members also were the Italian Social Movement and Greek National Political Union. The Ulster Unionist Party was also a member of ER after 1985. ER was succeeded by the Technical Group of the European Right after the 1989 European Parliament election.

== History ==
Following the 1984 elections, MEPs from the Italian Social Movement (MSI), Greek National Political Union (EPEN) and French National Front were elected. They formed the first formally far-right Group in the Parliament. They were later joined by John Taylor of the Ulster Unionist Party. In the 1989 elections, the Ulster Unionist retired and his successor sat in a different group while the EPEN members lost their seats, and the new MEPs from the German party The Republicans refused to ally themselves with the MSI due to disagreements over the status of South Tyrol. The Group collapsed and was succeeded by the Technical Group of the European Right.

== Members ==
Country	Name		Ideology	MEPs
France	National Front	FN	Neo-fascism; Right-wing populism	10 / 434
Italy	Italian Social Movement	MSI	Neo-fascism; Italian nationalism	5 / 434
Greece	National Political Union	EPEN	Metaxism; Greek nationalism	1 / 434
United Kingdom	Ulster Unionist Party (Note: After 1985)	UUP	British nationalism Conservatism	1 / 434

== See also ==
- Eurodroite

== Sources ==
- Department of Economics, University of California, Berkeley
- Centre Virtuel de la Connaissance sur l'Europe (CVCE) via European NAvigator
- Searchlight
- Australian Nationalist Ideological, Historical, and Legal Archive: Theories Of The Right: A Collection Of Articles
- BBC News
- Europe Politique
- European Parliament MEP Archives
