= Enea Franza =

Italian politician (1907–1986)

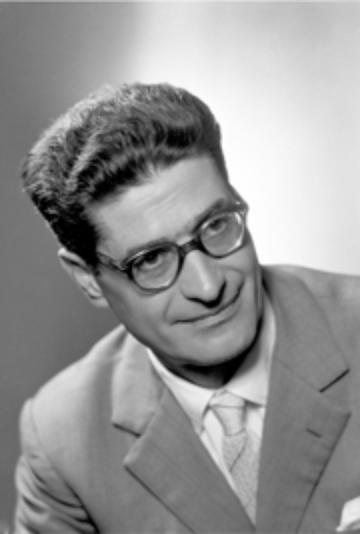

Senator of the Republic of Italy
- In office 8 May 1948 – 24 May 1972
- Constituency: Campania

Personal details
- Born: 2 June 1907 Ariano di Puglia, Italy
- Died: 31 January 1986 (aged 78)
- Party: Italian Social Movement
- Profession: Lawyer

Enea Franza (2 June 1907 — 31 January 1986) was an Italian politician for the Italian Social Movement and lawyer.

== Biography ==
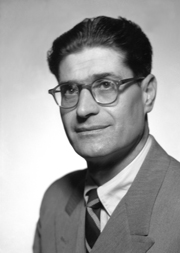
Franza's portrait for Legislature I of Italy

Franza was born on 2 June 1907 in Ariano di Puglia (currently Ariano Irpino), Italy. Prior to entering politics, he would work as a lawyer.

Franza entered politics in 1946 when he successfully became mayor of Ariano Irpino.

Franza was elected to the Italian Senate in 1948 and served there for five legislatures as a member of the Italian Social Movement (MSI) until 1972. He was the only MSI Senator elected to the first legislature. He would act as group leader for the MSI in the Senate during the first and third legislatures. As a Senator, he was an ardent opponent of communism and acted as a leader for the monarchist group.

Franza's son, Luigi Franza, would go on to also become an Italian Senator.
