= European Right (1989–1994) =

Former far-right political group of the European Parliament

Technical Group of the European Right
- European Parliament group
- Name: Technical Group of the European Right
- English abbr.: ER
- French abbr.: DR
- Formal name: Technical Group of the European Right
- Ideology: Right-wing populism; Euroscepticism
- Political position: Far-right
- From: 25 July 1989
- To: 18 July 1994
- Preceded by: Group of the European Right
- Chaired by: Jean-Marie Le Pen
- MEP(s): 17 (25 July 1989)

The Technical Group of the European Right (French: Groupe technique des droites européennes, abbr. ER) was a far-right political group that operated in the European Parliament between 1989 and 1994. It was led by the neo-fascist National Front of Jean-Marie Le Pen. Its members also were The Republicans and Vlaams Blok. In the aftermath of the 1994 European Parliament election, ER was dissolved due to not obtaining enough seats to continue as a group.

== History ==
Following the 1989 elections, the Group of the European Right lost its Ulster Unionist and Greek EPEN MEPs. The situation was further complicated when the perennial problem of the European far-right, its inability to form transnational alliances, reasserted itself when MEPs from the German Republikaner party refused to ally themselves with the Italian MSI due to disagreements over the status of South Tyrol. Eventually, the "Technical Group of the European Right" was formed from MEPs from the French Front National, German Republikaner and Belgian Vlaams Blok parties.

In the 1994 elections, the Republikaners failed to reach the 5% cutoff point for German elections and lost all its MEPs. The Technical Group of the European Right no longer had enough MEPs to qualify as a Group and its MEPs returned to the ranks of the independents.

== Members ==
Country	Name		Ideology	MEPs
France	National Front	FN	Neo-fascism; Right-wing populism	10 / 518
Germany	The Republicans	REP	National conservatism Right-wing populism	6 / 518
Belgium	Vlaams Blok	VB	Flemish nationalism Right-wing populism	1 / 434

== Sources ==
- Searchlight
- Australian Nationalist Ideological, Historical, and Legal Archive: Theories Of The Right: A Collection Of Articles
- European Consortium for Political Research, University of Essex
- BBC News
- Europe Politique
- European Parliament MEP Archives

== See also ==
- Euronat (1997-2009)
- Alliance of European National Movements (2009–2019)
- Alliance for Peace and Freedom (2015–present)
- Europe of Sovereign Nations Group (2024–present)
