= Luigi Franza =

Italian politician (1939–2020)

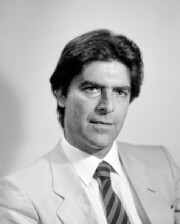

Senator of the Republic of Italy
- In office 12 July 1983 – 14 April 1994
- Constituency: Campania

Personal details
- Born: February 24, 1939 Ariano Irpino, Italy
- Died: October 19, 2020 (aged 81) Rome, Italy
- Party: Italian Democratic Socialist Party
- Occupation: Lawyer

Luigi Franza (24 February 1939 – 19 October 2020) was an Italian politician and lawyer.

== Biography ==
Franza was born in Ariano Irpino, Italy on 24 February 1939. His father was the prominent politician Enea Franza.

Franza was elected to the Italian Senate from 1983 until 1994 in the Campania region for the Italian Democratic Socialist Party. During this period, he would also serve as undersecretary to the Italian Ministry of Foreign Affairs in the Goria Cabinet.

Outside of politics, Franza also served as a successful lawyer. He would serve on the local Bar Association from 2004 to 2008.

Franza died on 19 October 2020 in Rome.
