= Italian Social Movement =

Neo-fascist political party, 1946–1995

Italian Social Movement Movimento Sociale Italiano
- Abbreviation: MSI
- Leaders: Giorgio Almirante (first); Gianfranco Fini (last)
- Founded: 26 December 1946
- Dissolved: 27 January 1995
- Merger of: Italian Movement of Social Unity; Front of the Italian
- Preceded by: Republican Fascist Party (de facto)
- Succeeded by: National Alliance (legal successor); Tricolour Flame (split)
- Headquarters: Via della Scrofa 43, Rome
- Newspaper: Secolo d'Italia
- Youth wing: Young Italy (1954–1971); Youth Front (1971–1995)
- Membership: 202,715 (1993); 240,063 (peak, 1963)
- Ideology: Neo-fascism; Ultra-nationalism; National conservatism (later years)
- Political position: Far-right
- European affiliation: European Social Movement (1951–1962); National Party of Europe (1962–1966)
- European Parliament group: Eurodroite (1979–1984); European Right (1984–1989); Non-Inscrits (1989–1995)
- Colours: Black
- Anthem: "Il canto degli italiani"

Party flag

The Italian Social Movement (Italian: Movimento Sociale Italiano, MSI) was a neo-fascist political party in Italy. A far-right party, it presented itself until the 1990s as the defender of Italian fascism's legacy, and later moved towards national conservatism. In 1972, the Italian Democratic Party of Monarchist Unity was merged into the MSI and the party's official name was changed to Italian Social Movement – National Right (Italian: Movimento Sociale Italiano – Destra Nazionale, MSI–DN).

Formed in 1946 by supporters of the former dictator Benito Mussolini, most of whom were involved with the Italian Social Republic and the Republican Fascist Party, the MSI became the fourth largest party in Italy by the early 1960s. The party gave informal local and eventually national support to the Christian Democracy party from the late 1940s and through the 1950s, sharing anti-communism. In the early 1960s, the party was pushed to the sidelines of Italian politics, and only gradually started to gain some political recognition in the 1980s. There was internal competition between the party's moderate and radical factions. The radicals led the party in its formative years under Giorgio Almirante, while the moderates gained control in the 1950s and 1960s. Almirante's return as leader in 1969 was characterised by a big tent strategy.

In 1987, the reins of the party were taken by Gianfranco Fini, under whom it was transformed in 1995 into National Alliance (AN), a post-fascist party. On that occasion a small minority, led by Pino Rauti, disagreed with the new course and formed Social Movement Tricolour Flame (MSFT) instead. In 2009, AN merged with the then centre-right main party, The People of Freedom (PdL), while Brothers of Italy was founded in 2012 as a right-wing split of the PdL, and ten years later it became the largest party in the country.

== History ==
=== Background ===
The MSI derived its name and ideals from the Italian Social Republic (RSI), a "violent, socialising, and revolutionary republican" variant of fascism established as a Nazi puppet state headed by Benito Mussolini in 1943 in the northern part of the Italian Peninsula behind Nazi German frontlines. The sole legal party of the republic, Mussolini's Republican Fascist Party (PFR), inspired the creation of the MSI. The party was formed by former fascist leaders and veterans of the republic's fascist army, and it has been regarded as the successor to both the PFR as well as the original National Fascist Party (PNF). The MSI nevertheless tried to modernise and revise fascist doctrine into a more moderate and sophisticated direction. It also drew from elements of the anti-communist and anti-establishment stance of the short-lived postwar populist Common Man's Front protest party, and many of its original backers would find a home in the MSI after its dissolution in 1949.

=== Early years (1946–1954) ===
On 12 November 1946, the Italian Movement of Social Unity (Movimento Italiano di Unità Sociale, MIUS) was created by Giorgio Almirante and former fascist veterans of the Italian Social Republic (RSI) to provide a formal role to its representatives, who were supposed to attend a meeting on 26 December in Arturo Michelini's office.

The Italian Social Movement was officially founded on 26 December 1946 in Rome via the merging of small political groups: the MIUS, the Front of the Italian (Fronte dell'Italiano), the Front of Work (Fronte del Lavoro), the Trade Union of Italian Railwaymen (Unione Sindacale dei Ferrovieri Italiani), and the Independent Veterans Group (Gruppo Reduci Indipendenti). Former RSI official Giorgio Almirante became the party's first leader. The three initial main goals of the party were to revive Mussolini's fascism, attack Italian democracy and fight communism. Due to the anti-fascist consensus embodied by the post-war Constitution of Italy and agreements with the Allied forces, advocating a return to fascism had to be done discreetly. Although the MSI adapted itself into the constraints of the democratic environment, its manifest ideology was clearly antagonistic and antithetical to liberal democracy, and it was consequently excluded from the Constitutional Arch, the circles of parties that had taken part in the drafting and approval of the Italian Constitution and which persisted as a loose coalition on certain policymaking issues, and from the parties deemed legitimate to govern.

The MSI won financial support from wealthy businessmen and landowners who feared a possible communist regime seizing power in Italy, either coming from a domestic revolution or a takeover by Soviet forces. In the 1948 Italian general election, the neo-fascist party won seven deputies and one senator. But the MSI soon witnessed growing internal conflicts between conservatives, who sought involvement in NATO and political alliances with Monarchists and Christian Democrats, and hardliners who wanted the party to turn into anti-American and anti-establishment platform. Almirante was replaced as the leader of the party in 1950 due to his uncompromising anti-NATO position. His position taken by conservative Augusto De Marsanich, under whose leadership the party won some strong electoral gains.

=== Leadership of Arturo Michelini (1954–1969) ===
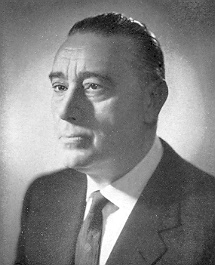
Arturo Michelini

Four years later in 1954, De Marsanich was replaced by Arturo Michelini. The conservative elements dominated the party in the 1950s and 1960s, and it maintained a rather moderate course. By the late 1950s, the MSI had become Italy's fourth largest party, and the Italian party system was unique in Europe in terms of having a continual and significant neo-fascist presence since the end of World War II. Michelini established the strategy of inserimento (insertion) during his leadership of the party, which consisted in gaining acceptance through cooperation with other parties within the framework of liberal democracy. Disgruntled by the MSI's focus on parliamentarism and their attempts to establish an image of democratic respectability, the radicals broke out to create several splinter groups. Pino Rauti and others left in 1956 to found Ordine Nuovo, while Stefano Delle Chiaie established the National Vanguard in 1960.

In the wider context of the Cold War, anti-communism had replaced anti-fascism as the abiding principle of the Italian Republic, and Christian Democrats started to accept political backing from the party (along with Monarchists and Liberals) to prop up their minority governments after the 1958 Italian general election. Already in the late 1940s, the Christian Democrats, somewhat reluctantly, had discreetly accepted support from the MSI to keep the Italian Communist Party (PCI) out of the Roman city council.

In March 1960, the MSI even became the sole backer of the Christian Democratic minority Tambroni Cabinet, which had enormous political implications. As concerns grew over the party's expanding role in Italian politics, riots became commonplace between neo-fascist supporters and radical leftists. Learning that the National Congress of the MSI was about to be held in Genoa in July 1960 to celebrate the accomplishment of the inserimento strategy, militant anti-fascist protests erupted on 30 June in the city. Those rallies spread to other Italian cities over the next fortnight, resulting in violent and sometimes lethal clashes with the police. The government consequently banned the congress from taking place, and eventually resigned on 27 July. This event marked the failed end of the inserimento strategy, and the beginning of the party's long decline. Following the victory of a centre-left government in 1963, the Christian Democrats no longer needed the parliamentary support of the MSI, and the party was definitively forced back into the "political ghetto". Its main objective in the following decades thus became to get back into the political game. The demise of the strategy is also deemed conducive to the radicalisation of the violent splinter groups like Ordine Nuovo.

=== Leadership of Giorgio Almirante (1969–1987) ===
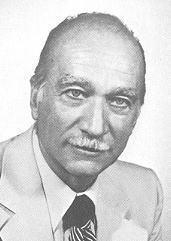
Giorgio Almirante

Michelini remained the leader of the MSI until his death in 1969, when the party's first leader Almirante regained control. The latter attempted to revitalise the party by pursuing an aggressive policy against left-wing student uprisings, since the 1968 student movement had been devastating for the party's youth organisation.

Learning from Michelini's failed approach of inserimento, Almirante declared in his report to the party's central committee in 1969: "We stand before two different paths: an alternative to the system or an alternative within the system". He introduced a double strategy of hard anti-systemic discourse combined with the creation of a broader "National Right" (Destra Nazionale) coalition in 1972. He broadened the party in both conservative and radical directions, initiated a cooperation that eventually led to a merger with the Monarchist National Party, reintegrated Rauti and other radicals into the MSI, and attempted to attract conservative figures from the Christian Democrats and the Liberals. The party grew strongly in the early 1970s, claiming 420,000 members in 1973. Contesting the 1972 Italian general election in a joint list with Monarchists, the MSI almost doubled its support up to 8.7% of the votes, its highest score ever until 1994. It successfully capitalised on southern protests and an agenda of "law and order".

However, the MSI supported acts of political violence committed by young activists and the revolts in the Mezzogiorno; the party was also in contact with some sectors of terrorismo nero ("black terrorism"), involved in right-wing domestic terrorist attacks during the Years of lead. Those connections, in apparent contraction to the respectability sought by the party, damaged its public reputation. Support for the MSI consequently receded in the 1976 Italian general election, and many conservatives pulled out from the party, leaving it with 279,000 members that year. Frustrated in their aspiration to turn the MSI in a mainstream conservative party, moderates formed the short-lived National Democracy in 1976, accusing Almirate of maintaining contacts with right-wing terrorism and of being unable to follow a concrete parliamentary strategy. The new party, which took with it half the MSI parliamentary representation and nearly all of its public finance, was dissolved in the aftermath of the 1979 Italian general election.

During the late 1970s and early 1980s, a second wave of right-wing terrorism in Italy led to political radicalisation among some MSI members, and a part of them left the party to form new splinter groups. A new wave of studies and "historicisation" of fascism, widely debated in the public media, participated in pacifying the political climate. The MSI's insistent denunciations of violence began to gain in credibility, and the party became less stigmatised in mainstream politics. The process was facilitated by the liberalization of radio, in 1975, which allowed the creation of numerous, local, left-wing radio stations but also right-wing ones in major cities of Italy, such as Radio University in Milan, which began broadcasting the views, the positions, and the ideological stance of the far right.

After he became prime minister in 1983, Bettino Craxi of the Italian Socialist Party met with MSI leaders, and his office later issued a statement that expressed regrets for the "ghettoisation" of the party. In 1984, high-level representatives of the Christian Democrats, the Liberals and the Democratic Socialists attended the party congress of the MSI for the first time. The next year, the party was granted a position on the board of directors of the RAI, the state radio and television network.

=== Leadership of Gianfranco Fini (1987–1995) ===
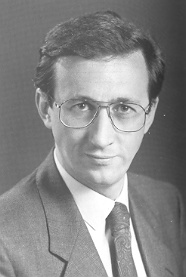
Gianfranco Fini

Gianfranco Fini took over the party leadership from Almirante in 1987, as his anointed successor and favoured candidate by the party's old guard. However, following Almirante's death the next year, Fini was left without his protector and gradually viewed as a weak leader, unable to turn around the decline and isolation of the party. Fini also adopted provocative initiatives against the internal opposition.

In 1990 Pino Rauti briefly gained the leadership of the party from Fini, but his revolutionary, anti-capitalist and leftist (yet loyal fascist) approach further alienated the party's supporters. As a result, Fini regained the leadership in 1991. Fini then sought to downplay the fascist origins of the MSI, further dividing the party into several factions. He transformed the MSI into the more moderate National Alliance (AN), going farther than Almirante's 1970s "National Right" strategy. Fini came to be viewed as a skilful political operator and he gained the support of the party majority.

In the Tangentopoli scandals of the early 1990s, a pool of judges discovered a widespread system of corruption in all of the mainstream Italian parties, and many key politicians were brought on trial. The scandals were devastating for the involved parties and resulted in their dissolutions, and the so-called "First Republic" collapsed. The MSI was not affected by the scandals, for it had not been taken part in the Italian political life. Nevertheless, a radical transformation was required to break away from its fascist heritage. At the same time, the end of the Cold War helped de-radicalising Italian politics. The corruption scandals also led the Italian political competition to become very personalised. In 1993, Fini and Alessandra Mussolini, the granddaughter of Benito Mussolini, surprisingly won unprecedented large support when running for mayor in Rome and Naples, respectively. Although they lost the elections, they each won about 45% of the vote.

The AN project was launched in 1993, contested the 1994 Italian general election, and the MSI was finally dissolved in and replaced by AN in January 1995. Rauti and other radicals attempted to reconstitute the MSI as Social Movement Tricolour Flame (MSFT), but with only modest success. Fini in turn went on to lead AN to huge electoral gains, into the Pole of Good Government coalition with political newcomer Silvio Berlusconi and his Forza Italia party, and eventually into part of his governments. The party's participation in the 1994 government met strong criticism from several European politicians, but did not manifest itself in any diplomatic implications. In just a few years, Fini had turned the MSI from a position of stagnation to one of the members of the ruling coalition. Although long-term and other short-term factors were part of the new fortunes for the party, it could arguably hardly have happened without the effects of the Tangentopoli scandals.

== Ideology ==
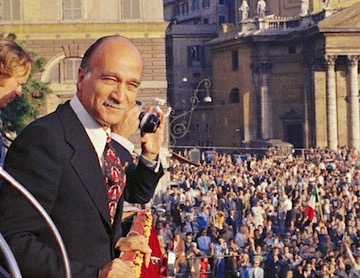
Giorgio Almirante during a rally in Rome

The MSI's political program stressed traditional values, law and order, and hostility towards revolution and revolutionary movements. It particularly advocated a centralised state with a presidential system of government, and no devolution of powers to regions. The party pursued a dualistic policy, in which it combined anti-establishment discourse with a practical policy of electoral cooperation with the mainstream right.

According to Aldo Cazzullo, the MSI had "two souls": one "inspired by Arturo Michelini, was bourgeois, Atlanticist, pro-American and pro-Israel" and the other led by Pino Rauti, was "anti-bourgeois, anti-Atlantic, and pro-Arab"; the first "prevailed, also thanks to the decision by Giorgio Almirante who, after having clashed with him at the 1963 congress, made an agreement with Michelini".

Although it was for a long time preoccupied with the debate of fascism and anti-fascism, the party started to distance itself from this in the early 1970s to rather focus on contemporary Italian issues. While both wings of the party agreed after the 1950s that fascism was dead, they nevertheless saw some good things in fascism that they wanted to reinstitute. When the party transformed itself into the AN, it outspokenly rejected fascism, as well as "any kind of totalitarianism and racism". In contrast to other far-right parties in Europe which increased their power in the late 1980s, the MSI chose not to campaign against immigration, because Italy was less concerned about the topic at the time versus other European countries.

=== Internal factions ===
The MSI included a large variety of currents, which ranged from republicans to monarchists, Catholics to anti-clericals, conservative capitalists to radical anticapitalists, and revolutionaries to corporatists. The party was mainly divided between the adherents of what Renzo De Felice called the "fascism-movement" and the "fascism-regime", roughly also corresponding to the party's "northern" and "southern" factions. The former "leftist"-tendency was more militant and radical, and claimed heritage from the socialistic and anti-bourgeois "republican" fascism of the Italian Social Republic and pre-1922 fascism, as represented by the Fascio d'Azione Rivoluzionaria. The latter drew more from the mainstream clerical, conservative, authoritarian, and bourgeois fascist tendency that prevailed after the stabilisation of the fascist regime.

Most of the party's initial leaders were northern radicals, but most of its support was from voters in the South. In the North, the party elite to a large extent consisted of highly ideological veterans from the civil war. As the Italian Social Republic (RSI) had not existed in the South, and there thus had been no civil war, the southern MSI-supporters and notables were by contrast largely moderate-conservatives, less interested in ideology. When the conservatives gained power of the party in the 1950s, they steered it more towards the traditional clerical and monarchist right-wing.

=== Foreign policy ===
The MSI took a strongly nationalistic approach in foreign policy, but was initially divided between "third force" and pro-NATO groups. It abstained when the parliament voted on Italy's admission into NATO in 1949, but later expressed support for NATO and the European Community, based on a "European nationalism" idea. The party supported Italy's inclusion in the European Monetary System in 1979, as well as the installation of American cruise missiles in Sicily in 1983.

Unlike other post-fascist or far-right parties in Europe during its time, the MSI supported the State of Israel.

=== International affiliation ===
From the end of the war to the late 1980s, the MSI was the chief reference point for the European far-right. By the initiative of the MSI, the European Social Movement was established after conferences in Rome in 1950 and Malmö, Sweden, in 1951. The conference in Malmö was attended by around one hundred delegates from French, British, German, Austrian, Italian, Spanish, Hungarian, and Swedish neo-fascist groups, with some notable figures including Maurice Bardèche, Karl-Heinz Priester, Oswald Mosley, and Per Engdahl. The MSI was also part of the New European Order, together with, among others, the Falange and the Socialist Reich Party. Due to the MSI's support for continued Italian control of South Tyrol, German-speaking delegates eventually left the NEO. Growing divisions and external competition left both groups largely moribund by 1957. At a conference in Venice in 1962, the National Party of Europe was formed by the MSI, the Union Movement, the Deutsche Reichspartei, Jeune Europe, and the Mouvement d'Action Civique. The group was effectively defunct by 1966.

In response to the development of "eurocommunism" in the mid-1970s, Almirante initiated the first conference of a "Euro-Right" in Rome in 1978. The meeting included the Francoist New Force, France's Party of New Forces (PFN), and parties from Belgium, Portugal, and Greece. The parties were unable to gather enough support to establish a group in the European Parliament following the 1979 European election. After the 1984 European election, the MSI was finally able to establish a European Right group, together with the French National Front (which had emerged victorious from its rivalry with the PFN) and the Greek National Political Union. However, following the 1989 European election, the MSI refused to join the new European Right group over the territorial dispute of South Tyrol, due to the arrival of The Republicans, a German party which supported South Tyrol claims made by the Freedom Party of South Tyrol. Neither The Republicans, nor the Belgian Vlaams Blok party, wanted to form a group with the MSI over this issue. As the MSI transformed itself into AN, it distanced itself from increasingly powerful European far-right parties such as France's Front National and Austria's Freedom Party.

== Popular support ==
The electoral support for the MSI fluctuated around 5 per cent, with its supporting peaking in 1972 at almost 9 per cent. The party's popular support came mostly from the southern underclass and the rural oligarchy until the 1960s, and later from the urban middle classes, especially in Rome, Naples, Bari, and the other cities of the Centre-South. Its supporters consisted demographically of old fascists, lower-middle-class shopkeepers, and artisans, as well as a number of bureaucrats, police, and military. Reasons to vote for the MSI included protest votes, nostalgia, and support for traditional values, as well as southern resentment of the North. As the old fascist veterans started to fade away, the party in turn gained support from alienated youth groups.

Although most of the party's initial leaders were radicals from the North, the party's electoral base was in the South. In its first election, almost 70 per cent of the party's votes came from regions south of Rome, and all of its elected parliamentary representatives came from southern constituencies. In the 1952 local elections, the MSI–Monarchist alliance won 11.8% of the votes in the South. In 1972, when the MSI was at its peak, it won 14.8% in Lazio (17.4% in Rome and 21.0% in Latina), 16.7% in Campania (26.3% in Naples and 22.2% in Salerno), 12.5% in Apulia (21.0% in Lecce, 18.8% in Bari, and 18.4% in Foggia), 12.2% in Calabria (36.3% in Reggio Calabria), 15.9% in Sicily (30.6% in Catania, 24.4% in Messina, and 20.7% in Siracusa) and 11.3% in Sardinia (16.0% in Cagliari).

By the beginning of the 1990s the MSI had strengthened its position, especially in Lazio, and, when the Christian Democrats disbanded in 1993–94, the MSI was able to attract many Christian Democratic voters in Central and Southern Italy, as well as many formerly Italian Socialist Party votes, especially in Friuli-Venezia Giulia. In some places, such as Lazio, the MSI became the new dominant political force. At a time when Lega Nord was booming in the North, several voters south of the Po River liked the MSI's appeals to Italian identity and unity. In the 1996 Italian general election, the first after the transformation of the MSI into AN, the Italian right-wing won its best result ever: 15.7% nationally, 28.9% in Lazio (where, with 31.3%, AN was the largest party in Rome), 19.8% in Umbria, 21.1% in Abruzzo, 20.0% in Campania, 23.5% in Basilicata, 22.1% in Apulia, 20.9% in Calabria, and 20.3% in Sardinia.

The electoral results of MSI in general (Chamber of Deputies) and European Parliament elections since 1948 are shown in the chart below.

== Election results ==
=== Italian Parliament ===
Election	Leader	Chamber of Deputies					Senate of the Republic				
Election	Leader	Votes	%	Seats	+/–	Position	Votes	%	Seats	+/–	Position
1948	Giorgio Almirante	526,882	2.0	6 / 574	▲6	▲7th	164,092	0.7	1 / 237	▲1	▲8th
1953	Augusto De Marsanich	1,582,154	5.8	29 / 590	▲23	▲5th	1,473,645	6.1	9 / 237	▲8	▲5th
1958	Arturo Michelini	1,407,718	4.8	24 / 596	▼5	▲4th	1,150,051	4.4	8 / 246	▼1	5th
1963	Arturo Michelini	1,570,282	5.1	27 / 630	▲3	▼6th	1,458,917	5.3	15 / 315	▲7	▼6th
1968	Arturo Michelini	1,414,036	4.5	24 / 630	▼3	6th	1,304,847	4.6	11 / 315	▼4	▲5th
1972	Giorgio Almirante	2,894,722	8.7	56 / 630	▲32	▲4th	2,766,986	9.2	26 / 315	▲15	▲4th
1976	Giorgio Almirante	2,238,339	6.1	32 / 630	▼24	4th	2,086,430	6.6	15 / 315	▼11	4th
1979	Giorgio Almirante	1,930,639	5.3	30 / 630	▼2	4th	1,780,950	5.7	13 / 315	▼2	4th
1983	Giorgio Almirante	2,511,487	6.8	42 / 630	▲12	4th	2,283,524	7.4	18 / 315	▲5	4th
1987	Giorgio Almirante	2,281,126	5.9	35 / 630	▼7	4th	2,121,026	6.5	16 / 315	▼2	4th
1992	Gianfranco Fini	2,107,037	5.4	34 / 630	▼1	▼6th	2,171,215	6.5	16 / 315	0	▼6th

=== European Parliament ===
Election	Leader	Votes	%	Seats	+/–	Position	EP Group
1979	Giorgio Almirante	1,909,055	5.5	4 / 81	▲4	▲4th	NI
1984	Giorgio Almirante	2,274,556	6.5	5 / 81	▲1	4th	ER
1989	Gianfranco Fini	1,918,650	5.5	4 / 81	▼1	4th	NI

=== Regional elections ===
Regions of Italy
Election year	Leader	Votes	%	Seats	+/−
1970	Giorgio Almirante	1,621,180 (5th)	5.9	34 / 720	–
1975	Giorgio Almirante	1,950,213 (4th)	6.4	40 / 720	▲6
1980	Giorgio Almirante	1,785,750 (4th)	5.9	37 / 720	▼3
1985	Giorgio Almirante	2,087,404 (4th)	6.5	41 / 720	▲4
1990	Gianfranco Fini	1,246,564 (5th)	3.9	25 / 720	▼16

== Leadership ==
- Secretaries: Giacinto Trevisonno (1946–1947), Giorgio Almirante (1947–1950), Augusto De Marsanich (1950–1954), Arturo Michelini (1954–1969), Giorgio Almirante (1969–1987), Gianfranco Fini (1987–1990), Pino Rauti (1990–1991), Gianfranco Fini (1991–1995)
- Presidents: Valerio Borghese (1952–1954), Augusto De Marsanich (1954–1972), Gino Birindelli (1972–1973), Alfredo Covelli (1973–1976), Pino Romualdi (1976–1982), Nino Tripodi (1982–1987), Giorgio Almirante (1987–1988), Alfredo Pazzaglia (1990–1994)
- Honorary Presidents: Rodolfo Graziani (1953–1955), Cesco Giulio Baghino (1990–1995)
- Leaders in the Chamber of Deputies: Giorgio Almirante (1946–1953), Giovanni Roberti (1953–1968), Giorgio Almirante (1968–1969), Ernesto De Marzio (1969–1976), Giorgio Almirante (1977), Alfredo Pazzaglia (1977–1990), Francesco Servello (1990–1992), Giuseppe Tatarella (1992–1994), Raffaele Valensise (1994–1995)
- Leaders in the Senate:, Enea Franza (1953–1968), Augusto De Marsanich (1968–1972), Gastone Nencioni (1972–1977), Araldo Crollalanza (1977–1985), Michele Marchio (1985–1987), Cristoforo Filetti (1987–1992), Saverio Pontone (1992–1994), Giulio Maceratini (1994–1995)

== Symbols ==
1946–1972

== See also ==
- CasaPound
- List of political parties in Italy
- New Force (Italy)
- Terza Posizione

== Bibliography ==
- Atkins, Stephen E. (2004). "Italian Social Movement (Movimento Sociale Italiano) (MSI) (Italy)". Encyclopedia of modern worldwide extremists and extremist groups. Greenwood Publishing Group. ISBN 978-0-313-32485-7.
- Davies, Peter; Lynch, Derek (2002). The Routledge Companion to Fascism and the Far Right. Routledge. ISBN 978-1-134-60952-9.
- Fella, Stefano; Ruzza, Carlo (2009). Re-inventing the Italian Right: Territorial Politics, Populism and 'post-fascism'. Routledge. ISBN 9781134286348.
- Ferraresi, Franco (1988). "The Radical Right in Postwar Italy". Politics & Society. 16 (1). Sage CA: Thousand Oaks, CA: Sage Publications: 71–119. doi:10.1177/003232928801600103. ISSN 0032-3292. S2CID 153805679.
- Gallego, Ferran (1999). "The Extreme Right in Italy From the Italian Social Movement to Post-Fascism" (PDF). Working Papers (169). Barcelona: Institute of Political and Social Sciences, Autonomous University of Barcelona. ISSN 1133-8962.
- Guerra, Nicola, ed. (2021). "Il linguaggio politico della sinistra e della destra extraparlamentari negli anni di piombo". Italian Studies. 76 (4). Italian Studies - Taylor & Francis: 406–420. doi:10.1080/00751634.2021.1923172. S2CID 236341889.
- Guerra, Nicola, ed. (2020). "Il linguaggio politico di piazza della destra radicale e dei movimenti neofascisti negli Anni di Piombo". Mediterranean Language Review: (17) 61–85.
- Guerra, Nicola, ed. (2020). "Il linguaggio degli opposti estremismi negli anni di piombo. Un'analisi comparativa del lessico nelle manifestazioni di piazza". Italian Studies. 75 (4). Italian Studies - Taylor & Francis: 1–17. doi:10.1080/00751634.2020.1820818.
- Ignazi, Piero (1998). "MSI/AN: A Mass Party with the Temptation of the Führer-Prinzip". In Ignazi, Piero; Ysmal, Colette (eds.). The organisation of political parties in Southern Europe. Greenwood Publishing Group. pp. 157–177. ISBN 978-0-275-95612-7.
- Ignazi, Piero (2003). "Italy: The Faded Beacon and the Populist Surge". Extreme right parties in Western Europe. Oxford University Press. pp. 35–61. ISBN 978-0-19-829325-5.
- Levy, Carl (1996). "From Fascism to 'Post-Fascists': Italian Roads to Modernity". In Bessel, Richard (ed.). Fascist Italy and Nazi Germany: comparisons and contrasts. Cambridge University Press. pp. 165–196. ISBN 978-0-521-47711-6.
- Milesi, Patrizia; Chirumbolo, Antonio; Catellani, Patrizia (2006). "Italy: The offspring of fascism". In Klandermans, Bert; Mayer, Nonna (eds.). Extreme right activists in Europe: through the magnifying glass. Routledge. pp. 67–92. ISBN 978-0-415-35827-9.
- Spotts, Frederic; Wieser, Theodor (1986). "The far right". Italy, a difficult democracy: a survey of Italian politics. Cambridge University Press. ISBN 978-0-521-31511-1.
- Tripodi, Paolo (1998). "The National Alliance and the evolution of the Italian right". The Contemporary Review. 272 (1589): 295–301. ISSN 0010-7565.
