= Christian de La Malène =

French politician

Christian Lunet de La Malène (5 December 1920, Nîmes – 26 September 2007) was a French and European politician. He was a member of the UDR party. He represented Paris's 16th constituency in 1958 and from 1962–1978.

He served as the French Minister of Scientific Research and Atomic and Space Questions from 1968. Prior to that he served as a Member of the European Parliament, including acting as the head of the Progressive Democrats group.

== Honors ==
- Chevalier de la Légion d'honneur
- Croix de guerre 1939-1945

== Bibliography ==
- Une espérance inassouvie : 30 ans d'Europe, Christian de La Malène, 1989 ISBN 978-2-225-81785-4
