= National Political Union (1984) =

National Political Union Εθνική Πολιτική Ένωσις Ethniki Politiki Enosis
- Abbreviation: EΠΕΝ; EPEN
- Founder: Georgios Papadopoulos
- Founded: 1984
- Dissolved: 1996
- Merged into: Hellenic Front
- Ideology: Anti-communism; Greek nationalism; National conservatism; Militarism; Metaxism
- Political position: Far-right
- European Parliament group: European Right (1984–1989)

The National Political Union (Greek: Εθνική Πολιτική Ένωσις, EΠΕΝ, Ethniki Politiki Enosis, EPEN) was a far-right political party in Greece. The party was founded on January 30, 1984 by jailed former junta leader Georgios Papadopoulos. It participated (unsuccessfully) in the 1985 general election. In the 1984 elections to the European Parliament, the party polled 2.3% of the vote, giving it one of the 24 seats held by Greece.

== Members of EPEN ==
Well-known members of EPEN were:

- Georgios Papadopoulos
- Makis Voridis
- Nikolaos Michaloliakos
- Chrysanthos Dimitriadis
- Spyros Zournatzis

== Electoral results ==
Results 1996–2000 (year links to election page)
Year	Type of Election	Votes	%	Mandates
1984	European Parliament	136,642	2.29%	1
1985	Parliament	37,965	0.6%	0
June 1989	Parliament	21,149	0.3%	0
1989	European	75,877	1.16%	0
1993	Parliament	9,469	0.14%	0
1996	Parliament	16,501	0.24%	0

== See also ==
- National Political Union (1946)
