= List of members of the European Parliament (1989–1994) =

The third European Parliament election by direct universal suffrage, took place in June 1989. The citizens of twelve countries elected overall 518 MEPs for a term of five years.

== MEPs by Country ==
- MEPs for Belgium 1989–1994
- MEPs for Denmark 1989–1994
- MEPs for France 1989–1994
- MEPs for Greece 1989–1994
- MEPs for (West) Germany 1989–1994
- MEP observers for East Germany 1991–1994
- MEPs for Ireland 1989–1994
- MEPs for Italy 1989–1994
- MEPs for Luxembourg 1989–1994
- List of members of the European Parliament for the Netherlands, 1989–1994
- MEPs for Spain 1989–1994
- MEPs for Portugal 1989–1994
- MEPs for the UK 1989–1994

== A ==
- Gordon Adam
- Maria Aglietta
- Sylviane Ainardi
- Alexandros Alavanos
- Siegbert Alber
- Mechthild von Alemann
- Jean-Marie Alexandre
- Claude Allègre
- Michèle Alliot-Marie
- José Álvarez de Paz
- Rui Amaral
- Gianfranco Amendola
- Georgios Anastassopoulos
- Hedy d'Ancona
- Anne André-Léonard
- Niall Andrews
- Didier Anger
- Bernard Antony
- José Apolinário
- Víctor Manuel Arbeloa Muru
- Aline Archimbaud
- Javier Areitio Toledo
- Miguel Arias Cañete
- Marie-Christine Aulas
- Claude Autant-Lara
- Paraskevas Avgerinos

== B ==
- Gianni Baget Bozzo
- Richard Balfe
- Juan María Bandrés Molet
- Mary Banotti
- José Barata Moura
- Enrique Barón Crespo
- Heribert Barrera
- José Barros Moura
- Roger Barton
- Michèle Barzach
- Roberto Barzanti
- Charles Baur
- Christopher Beazley
- Peter Beazley
- Luis Filipe Pais Beirôco
- Maria Belo
- Jean-Paul Benoit
- Pierre Bernard-Reymond
- Jan Bertens
- Nicholas Bethell
- Virginio Bettini
- Vincenzo Bettiza
- Bouke Beumer
- Rosaria Bindi
- John Bird
- Birgit Bjørnvig
- Freddy Blak
- Neil Blaney
- Yvan Blot
- Reinhold Bocklet
- Reimer Böge
- Pedro Bofill Abeilhe
- Bruno Boissière
- Alain Bombard
- Jens-Peter Bonde
- Andrea Bonetti
- Rinaldo Bontempi
- Franco Borgo
- Jean-Louis Borloo
- Jean-Louis Bourlanges
- David Bowe
- Jürgen Brand
- Ursula Braun-Moser
- Georges de Brémonds d'Ars
- Hiltrud Breyer
- Yvon Briant
- Mathilde van den Brink
- Rogério Brito
- Elmar Brok
- Carlos María Bru Purón
- Janey O'Neil Buchan
- Martine Buron

== C ==
- Jesús Cabezón Alonso
- Rafael Calvo Ortega
- Juan José de la Cámara Martínez
- Pío Cabanillas Gallas
- Pedro Manuel Canavarro
- Eusebio Cano Pinto
- António Capucho
- Antonio Cariglia
- Pierre Carniti
- Carlos Carvalhas
- José Vicente Carvalho Cardoso
- Carlo Casini
- José Ramón Caso Garcia
- Maria Luisa Cassanmagnago Cerretti
- Bryan Cassidy
- Luciana Castellina
- Anna Catasta
- Fred Catherwood
- Gérard Caudron
- Janine Cayet
- Adriana Ceci
- Pierre Ceyrac
- Henry Chabert
- Raphaël Chanterie
- Raymond Chesa
- Claude Cheysson
- Mauro Chiabrando
- Frode Nør Christensen
- Ib Christensen
- Ejner Hovgård Christiansen
- Efthymios Christodoulou
- Gaetano Cingari
- Ken Coates
- Yves Cochet
- Carlos Coelho
- António Antero Coimbra Martins
- Juan Colino Salamanca
- Kenneth Collins
- Emilio Colombo
- Joan Colom I Naval
- Renée Conan
- Felice Contu
- Patrick Mark Cooney
- Maria Teresa Coppo Gavazzi
- Francesco Corleone
- Petrus Cornelissen
- Jean-Pierre Cot
- Pat Cox
- Birgit Cramon Daiber
- Peter Crampton
- João Cravinho
- Christine Crawley
- Bettino Craxi
- Artur da Cunha Oliveira
- John Cushnahan

== D ==
- Joachim Dalsass
- Margaret Daly
- Pieter Dankert
- Wayne David
- Michel Debatisse
- Willy De Clercq
- Jean Defraigne
- Biagio de Giovanni
- Karel De Gucht
- Claude Delcroix
- Robert Delorozoy
- Aldo de Matteo
- Marie-José Denys
- Cesare de Piccoli
- Gérard Deprez
- Proinsias de Rossa
- Claude Desama
- Andrea Carmine De Simone
- Barry Desmond
- Dimitrios Dessylas
- Lorenzo de Vitto
- Gijs de Vries
- Mario Dido'
- Carmen Díez De Rivera Icaza
- Nel van Dijk
- Karel Dillen
- Marguerite-Marie Dinguirard
- Elio Di Rupo
- Teresa Domingo Segarra
- François-Xavier de Donnea
- Alan Donnelly
- Philippe Douste-Blazy
- José Manuel Duarte Cendán
- Bárbara Dührkop Dührkop
- Raymonde Dury
- Maurice Duverger

== E ==
- James Elles
- Michael Elliott
- Mireille Elmalan
- Vassilis Ephremidis
- Brigitte Ernst de la Graete
- Arturo Juan Escuder Croft
- José Antonio Escudero
- Nicolas Estgen
- Winifred Ewing

== F ==
- Laurent Fabius
- Alexander Falconer
- Enrico Falqui
- Antonio Fantini
- Giulio Fantuzzi
- Gipo Farassino
- Ben Fayot
- Gerardo Fernández-Albor
- Solange Fernex
- Giuliano Ferrara
- Concepció Ferrer
- Enrico Ferri
- Gianfranco Fini
- Gene Fitzgerald
- Jim Fitzsimons
- Colette Flesch
- Karl-Heinz Florenz
- Nicole Fontaine
- Glyn Ford
- Arnaldo Forlani
- Roberto Formigoni
- Mario Forte
- André Fourçans
- Yves Frémion
- Ingo Friedrich
- Bernard Frimat
- François Froment-Meurice
- Gérard Fuchs
- Honor Funk

== G ==
- Gerardo Gaibisso
- Yves Galland
- Marc Galle
- Giulio Cesare Gallenzi
- Max Gallo
- Juan Antonio Gangoiti Llaguno
- Juan Carlos Garaikoetxea Urriza
- Vasco Garcia
- Manuel García Amigo
- Ludivina García Arias
- Carles-Alfred Gasòliba I Böhm
- Charles de Gaulle
- Jas Gawronski
- Des Geraghty
- Marietta Giannakou-Koutsikou
- José María Gil-Robles Gil-Delgado
- Valéry Giscard d'Estaing
- Ernest Glinne
- Annemarie Goedmakers
- Willi Görlach
- Bruno Gollnisch
- Fernando Manuel Santos Gomes
- Laura González Álvarez
- Giovanni Goria
- Friedrich-Wilhelm Graefe zu Baringdorf
- Pauline Green
- Maxime François Gremetz
- Lissy Gröner
- Johanna-Christina Grund
- Maren Günther
- Guy Jean Guermeur
- Francesco Guidolin
- François Guillaume
- Antoni Gutiérrez Díaz

== H ==
- Otto von Habsburg
- Menelaos Chatzigeorgiou
- Klaus Hänsch
- Helga Haller von Hallerstein
- José Happart
- Lyndon Harrison
- Jean-Paul Heider
- Fernand Herman
- Anna Hermans
- Robert Hersant
- Michel Hervé
- Philippe A.R. Herzog
- Michael J. Hindley
- Magdalene Hoff
- Martin Holzfuss
- Geoffrey Hoon
- Karsten Friedrich Hoppenstedt
- Jean-François Hory
- Paul Howell
- Stephen Hughes
- John Hume

== I ==
- Franco Iacono
- Renzo Imbeni
- Richard Inglewood
- Antonio Iodice
- Marie Anne Isler Béguin
- John Iversen
- María Izquierdo Rojo

== J ==
- Caroline Jackson
- Christopher Jackson
- Erhard Jakobsen
- James Janssen van Raay
- Georg Jarzembowski
- Kirsten Jensen
- Marie Jepsen
- Claire Joanny
- Karin Junker
- Alain Juppé

== K ==
- Emmanouil Karellis
- Edward Kellett-Bowman
- Hedwig Keppelhoff-Wiechert
- Mark Killilea
- Egon Klepsch
- Heinz Fritz Köhler
- Klaus-Peter Köhler
- Niels Anker Kofoed
- Sotiris Kostopoulos
- Robert Ernest Krieps
- Annemarie Kuhn

== L ==
- Jeannou Lacaze
- José María Lafuente López
- Efstathios Lagakos
- Lelio Lagorio
- Patrick Joseph Lalor
- Giorgio La Malfa
- Francesco Lamanna
- Alain Lamassoure
- Panayotis Lambrias
- Karmelo Landa Mendibe
- Patrick Lane
- Brigitte Langenhagen
- Alexander Langer
- Horst Langes
- Paul Lannoye
- Antonio la Pergola
- Jessica Larive
- Nereo Laroni
- Pierre Lataillade
- Louis Lauga
- Jean-Marie le Chevallier
- Martine Lehideux
- Gerd Ludwig Lemmer
- Marlene Lenz
- Jean-Marie Le Pen
- Salvatore Lima
- Rolf Linkohr
- Dionysios Livanos
- Carmen Llorca Villaplana
- Calogero lo Giudice
- Alfred Lomas
- Francisco António Lucas Pires
- Günter Lüttge
- Astrid Lulling
- Rudolf Luster

== M ==
- John Joseph McCartin
- Henry Bell McCubbin
- Michael McGowan
- Anne Caroline Mcintosh
- Hugh McMahon
- Edward Mcmillan-Scott
- Alain Madelin
- Maria Magnani Noya
- Thomas Joseph Maher
- Gepa Maibaum
- Hanja Maij-Weggen
- Kurt Malangré
- Christian de la Malène
- Claude Malhuret
- Bernie Malone
- Agostino Mantovani
- Pol Marck
- Luís Marinho
- Alain Marleix
- António Joaquim Marques Mendes
- David Martin
- Simone Martin
- Jean-Claude Martinez
- Vincenzo Mattina
- Sylvie Mayer
- Antonio Mazzone
- Nora Mebrak-Zaïdi
- Manuel Medina Ortega
- Thomas Megahy
- Bruno Mégret
- Eugenio Melandri
- Arne Melchior
- Mario Melis
- José Mendes Bota
- Íñigo Méndez de Vigo
- Winfried Menrad
- Friedrich Merz
- Alman Metten
- Alberto Michelini
- Karl-Heinrich Mihr
- Joaquim Miranda
- Ana Miranda De Lage
- Pietro Mitolo
- Gérard Monnier-Besombes
- José María Montero Zabala
- Aymeri de Montesquiou Fezensac
- James Moorhouse
- Fernando Morán López
- Luigi Moretti
- Raúl Morodo Leoncio
- David Morris
- Giuseppe Mottola
- Gerd Müller
- Günther Müller
- Werner Münch
- Hemmo Muntingh
- Cristiana Muscardini
- François Musso

== N ==
- Pasqualina Napoletano
- Vito Napoli
- Giorgio Napolitano
- Antonio Navarro Velasco
- Harald Neubauer
- Arthur Stanley Newens
- Edward Newman
- Bill Newton Dunn
- Dimitrios Nianias
- James Nicholson
- Tove Nielsen
- Jean-Thomas Nordmann

== O ==
- Achille Occhetto
- Christine Margaret Oddy
- Charles Towneley Strachey, 4th Baron O'Hagan
- Francisco Oliva Garcia
- Gérard Onesta
- Leyla Onur
- Ria Oomen-Ruijten
- Arie Oostlander
- Marcelino Oreja
- Leopoldo Ortiz Climent

== P ==
- Pedro Pacheco Herrera
- Doris Pack
- Dimitrios Pagoropoulos
- Ian Paisley
- Gabriele Panizzi
- Marco Pannella
- Mihalis Papagiannakis
- Christos Papoutsis
- Eolo Parodi
- Karl Partsch
- Jean-Claude Pasty
- George Benjamin Patterson
- Karla Peijs
- Jean Penders
- Virgílio Pereira
- Fernando Pérez Royo
- Carlos Perreau De Pinninck Domenech
- Hartmut Perschau
- Nicole Pery
- Yiangos Pesmazoglou
- Helwin Peter
- Johannes Wilhelm Peters
- Willi Piecyk
- Dorothee Piermont
- Filippos Pierros
- Carlos Pimenta
- Michel Pinton
- Karel Pinxten
- René-Emile Piquet
- Fritz Pirkl
- Ferruccio Pisoni
- Nino Pisoni
- Luis Planas
- Charles Henry Plumb
- Hans-Gert Pöttering
- Lydie Polfer
- Anita Jean Pollack
- José Javier Pomés Ruiz
- Alain Pompidou
- Josep Pons Grau
- Giacomo Porrazzini
- Manuel Porto
- José Domingo Posada González
- Derek Prag
- Peter Price
- Bartho Pronk
- Christopher Prout
- Elda Pucci
- Alonso José Puerta
- Eduard Punset
- Maartje van Putten

== Q ==
- Jean Querbes
- Godelieve Quisthoudt-Rowohl
- Eva-Maria Quistorp

== R ==
- Jean-Pierre Raffarin
- Jean-Pierre Raffin
- Georgios Raftopoulos
- Andrea Raggio
- Juan de Dios Ramírez Heredia
- Christa Randzio-Plath
- Giuseppe Rauti
- Patricia Rawlings
- Imelda Mary Read
- Viviane Reding
- Tullio Eugenio Regge
- Marc Reymann
- Sérgio Ribeiro
- Günter Rinsche
- Klaus Riskær Pedersen
- Carlos Robles Piquer
- Joanna Rønn
- Dieter Rogalla
- Georgios Romeos
- Domènec Romera I Alcàzar
- Edoardo Ronchi
- Frédéric Rosmini
- Giorgio Rossetti
- Claudia Roth
- Dagmar Roth-Behrendt
- Mechtild Rothe
- Willi Rothley
- Panayotis Roumeliotis
- Christian Foldberg Rovsing
- Xavier Rubert de Ventós
- Mario Giovanni Guerriero Ruffini
- Guadalupe Ruiz-Giménez Aguilar
- José María Ruiz-Mateos Jiménez de Tejada

== S ==
- Henri Saby
- Bernhard Sälzer
- André Sainjon
- Jannis Sakellariou
- Margarida Salema Martins
- Heinke Salisch
- Detlev Samland
- Isidoro Sánchez García
- Ulla Margrethe Sandbæk
- Maria Amélia Santos
- Diego de los Santos López
- Francisco Javier Sanz Fernández
- Enrique Sapena Granell
- Georgios Saridakis
- Pavlos Sarlis
- Gabriele Sboarina
- Edgar Josef Schiedermeier
- Dieter Schinzel
- Marcel Schlechter
- Emil Schlee
- Ursula Schleicher
- Gerhard Schmid
- Barbara Schmidbauer
- Hans-Günter Schodruch
- Franz Schönhuber
- Léon Schwartzenberg
- James Scott-Hopkins
- Barry Seal
- Madron Richard Seligman
- Mateo Sierra Bardají
- Max Simeoni
- Richard Simmonds
- Barbara Simons
- Anthony Simpson
- Brian Simpson
- Joaquín Sisó Cruellas
- Alex Smith
- Llewellyn Smith
- Jan Sonneveld
- André Soulier
- Roberto Speciale
- Tom Spencer
- Francesco Enrico Speroni
- Paul Staes
- Ioannis Stamoulis
- Franz-Ludwig Schenk Graf von Stauffenberg
- Konstantinos Stavrou
- John Stevens
- George Stevenson
- Kenneth Stewart
- Jack Stewart-Clark
- Fernando Suárez González

== T ==
- Marco Taradash
- Giuseppe Tatarella
- Jacques Tauran
- Djida Tazdaït
- Wilfried Telkämper
- Anna Terrón I Cusí
- Bernard Thareau
- Diemut Theato
- Marianne Thyssen
- Leo Tindemans
- Gary Titley
- John Tomlinson (politician)
- Carole Tongue
- Günter Topmann
- José Manuel Torres Couto
- Catherine Trautmann
- Renzo Trivelli
- Konstantinos Tsimas
- Amédée Turner

== U ==
- Dick Ukeiwé

== V ==
- Dacia Valent
- José Valverde López
- Jaak Vandemeulebroucke
- Marijke van Hemeldonck
- Jean-Marie Vanlerenberghe
- Lode van Outrive
- Marie-Claude Vayssade
- José Vázquez Fouz
- Luciano Vecchi
- Simone Veil
- Wim van Velzen
- Herman Verbeek
- Josep Verde I Aldea
- Maxime Verhagen
- Jacques Vernier
- Luigi Vertemati
- Yves Verwaerde
- Bruno Visentini
- Ben Visser
- Kurt Vittinghoff
- Manfred Vohrer
- Dominique Voynet
- Thomas von der Vring
- Leen van der Waal

== W ==
- Antoine Waechter
- Gerd Walter
- Beate Weber
- Rüdiger von Wechmar
- Michael Welsh
- Norman West
- Klaus Wettig
- Ian White
- Florus Wijsenbeek
- Anthony Joseph Wilson
- Karl von Wogau
- Eisso Woltjer
- Francis Wurtz
- Terence Wynn

== Z ==
- Axel Zarges
- Georgios Zavvos
- Adrien Zeller

== See also ==
- Member of the European Parliament
- List of members of the European Parliament 1989–1994
- 1989 European Parliament election
