= List of members of the European Parliament for France, 1989–1994 =

Members of the European Parliament from France
ECSC delegation	(1952)
EP delegation	(1958)
1st term	(1979)
2nd term	(1984)
3rd term	(1989)
4th term	(1994)
5th term	(1999)
6th term	(2004)
7th term	(2009)
8th term	(2014)
9th term	(2019)
10th term	(2024)

This is a list of the members of the European Parliament for France from 1989 to 1994.

== List ==
Name	National party	EP Group	Constituency
Sylviane Ainardi	Communist Party	EUL	
Jean-Marie Alexandre	Socialist Party	PES	
Claude Allegre (until 25 November 1989) Michel Hervé (from 26 November 1989)	Socialist Party	PES	
Bernard Antony	National Front	ER	
Marie-Christine Aulas (until 10 December 1991) Renée Conan (from 11 December 1991 until 2 July 1992) Aline Archimbaud (since 6 July 1992)	The Greens	G	
Claude Autant-Lara (until 4 September 1989) Jean-Claude Martinez (from 5 September 1989)	National Front	ER	
Michèle Barzach (until 3 November 1989) Aymeri de Montesquiou Fezensac (from 4 November 1989 to 16 April 1993) Georges de Brémond d'Ars (from 18 April 1993	Rally for the Republic (until 3 November 1989) Radical Party (until 16 April 1993) Union for French Democracy	EDA (until 3 November 1989) LDR (until 16 April 1993) EPP	
Charles Baur (until 15 April 1993) Michel Pinton (from 16 April 1993)	Union for French Democracy (until 10 June 1990) Social Democratic Party (until 15 April 1993) Union for French Democracy	LDR (until 15 April 1993) NI	
Jean-Paul Benoit	Socialist Party (until 31 December 1989) Association of Democrats	PES	
Pierre Bernard-Reymond	Centre of Social Democrats	EPP	
Yvan Blot	National Front	ER	
Alain Bombard	Socialist Party	PES	
Jean-Louis Borloo (until 4 September 1992) François Froment-Meurice (from 5 September 1992)	Independent (until 4 September 1992) Centre of Social Democrats	NI (until 4 September 1992) EPP	
Jean-Louis Bourlanges	Independent	EPP	
Yvon Briant (until 13 August 1992) André Soulier (from 17 August 1992)	National Centre of Independents and Peasants (until 13 August 1992) Republican Party	EDA (until 13 August 1992) LDR	
Martine Buron	Socialist Party	PES	
Gérard Caudron	Socialist Party	PES	
Pierre Ceyrac	National Front (until 22 February 1994) Independent	ER (until 22 February 1994) NI	
Claude Cheysson	Socialist Party	PES	
Henry Chabert	Rally for the Republic	EDA (until 12 November 1991) EPP	
Yves Cochet (until 10 December 1991) Jean-Pierre Raffin (from 11 December 1991)	The Greens	G	
Didier Anger (until 10 December 1991) Bruno Boissière (from 11 December 1991)	The Greens	G	
Jean-Pierre Cot	Socialist Party	PES	
Adrien Zeller (until 5 April 1992) Michel Debatisse (from 6 April 1992)	Centre of Social Democrats	EPP	
Marie-José Denys	Socialist Party	PES	
Philippe Douste-Blazy (until 30 March 1993) Robert Delorozoy (from 31 March 1993)	Union for French Democracy (until 31 October 1990) Centre of Social Democrats (until 30 March 1993) Radical Party	EPP (until 30 March 1993) LDR	
Mireille Elmalan	Communist Party	EUL	
Laurent Fabius (until 2 April 1992) Bernard Frimat (from 3 April 1992)	Socialist Party	PES	
Solange Fernex (until 12 November 1991) Dominique Voynet (from 13 November 1991 to 10 December 1991) Marie Anne Isler Béguin (from 11 December 1991)	The Greens	G	
Nicole Fontaine	Centre of Social Democrats	EPP	
Alain Lamassoure (until 30 March 1993) Guy Jean Guermeur (from 31 March 1993)	Union for French Democracy (until 30 March 1993) Rally for the Republic	LDR (until 11 December 1991) EPP (until 30 March 1993) EDA	
Gérard Fuchs	Socialist Party	PES	
Yves Galland	Radical Party	LDR	
Max Gallo	Socialist Party	PES (until 7 July 1993) NI	
Valéry Giscard d'Estaing (until 9 June 1993) Jean-Paul Heider (from 10 June 1993)	Union for French Democracy (until 9 June 1993) Rally for the Republic	LDR (until 11 December 1991) EPP (until 9 June 1993) EDA	
Bruno Gollnisch	National Front	ER	
Maxime François Gremetz (until 11 February 1994) Jean Querbes (from 12 February 1994)	Communist Party	EUL	
Michèle Alliot-Marie (until 30 March 1993) André Fourçans (from 31 March 1993)	Rally for the Republic (until 30 March 1994) Union for French Democracy	EDA (until 30 March 1994) EPP	
François Guillaume	Rally for the Republic	EDA	
Robert Hersant	Union for French Democracy	LDR (until 11 December 1991) EPP	
Philippe Herzog	Communist Party	EUL	
Jean-François Hory	Radical Party of the Left	PES	
Claire Joanny (until 10 December 1991) Marguerite-Marie Dinguirard (from 11 December 1991)	The Greens	G	
Alain Juppé (until 15 October 1989) François Musso (from 16 October 1989)	Rally for the Republic	EDA	
Jeannou Lacaze	National Centre of Independents and Peasants (until 11 December 1991) Union of Democrats and Independents	LDR (until 11 December 1991) EPP	
Pierre Lataillade	Rally for the Republic	EDA	
Jean-Marie Le Chevallier	National Front	ER	
Martine Lehideux	National Front	ER	
Jean-Marie Le Pen	National Front	ER	
Alain Madelin (until 3 November 1989) Louis Lauga (from 4 November 1989)	Republican Party (until 3 November 1989) Rally for the Republic	LDR (until 3 November 1989) EDA	
Christian de la Malène	Rally for the Republic	EDA	
Alain Marleix (until 17 June 1993) Janine Cayet (from 18 June 1993)	Rally for the Republic (until 17 June 1993) Union for French Democracy	EDA (until 17 June 1993) LDR	
Claude Malhuret (until 16 April 1993) Raymond Chesa (from 17 April 1993)	Republican Party (until 16 April 1993) Rally for the Republic	LDR (until 16 April 1993) EDA	
Simone Martin	Republican Party	LDR	
Sylvie Mayer	Communist Party	EUL	
Nora Mebrak-Zaïdi	Socialist Party	PES	
Bruno Mégret	National Front	ER	
Gérard Monnier-Besombes (until 4 December 1991) Gérard Onesta (from 5 December 1991)	The Greens	G	
Jean-Thomas Nordmann	Radical Party	LDR	
Jean-Claude Pasty	Rally for the Republic	EDA	
Alain Pompidou	Rally for the Republic	EDA	
Nicole Pery	Socialist Party	PES	
René-Emile Piquet	Communist Party	EUL	
Jean-Pierre Raffarin	Republican Party	LDR	
Marc Reymann	Centre of Social Democrats	EPP	
Frédéric Rosmini	Socialist Party	PES	
Henri Saby	Socialist Party	PES	
André Sainjon	Independent	PES	
Léon Schwartzenberg	Socialist Party	PES	
Max Simeoni	Verts "Europe des peuples - Per un avvene corsu - Avenir corse"	RWG	
Jacques Tauran	National Front	ER	
Djida Tazdaït	The Greens	G	
Bernard Thareau	Socialist Party	PES	
Catherine Trautmann	Socialist Party	PES	
Dick Ukeiwé	Rally for the Republic	EDA	
Jacques Vernier (until 17 April 1993) Charles de Gaulle (from 17 April 1993)	Rally for the Republic (until 17 April 1993) Union for French Democracy	EDA	
Marie-Claude Vayssade	Socialist Party	PES	
Simone Veil (until 30 March 1993) Jean-Marie Vanlerenberghe (from 31 March 1992)	Union for French Democracy (until 30 March 1993) Centre of Social Democrats	LDR (until 30 March 1993) EPP	
Yves Verwaerde	Republican Party	LDR	
Antoine Waechter (until 19 December 1991) Yves Frémion (from 20 December 1991)	The Greens	G	
Francis Wurtz	Communist Party	EUL	
