= List of members of the European Parliament for Portugal, 1989–1994 =

This is a list of the 24 members of the European Parliament for Portugal in the 1989 to 1994 session.

== List ==
Name	National party	EP Group
António Capucho	Social Democratic Party	LDR
Rui Amaral	Social Democratic Party	LDR
Carlos Pimenta	Social Democratic Party	LDR
Manuel Porto	Social Democratic Party	LDR
António Marques Mendes	Social Democratic Party	LDR
Margarida Salema	Social Democratic Party	LDR
José Mendes Bota	Social Democratic Party	LDR
Virgílio Pereira (1989–1994)	Social Democratic Party	LDR
Vasco Garcia	Social Democratic Party	LDR
Carlos Coelho (1994)	Social Democratic Party	LDR
João Cravinho	Socialist Party	SOC (1989–1993); PES (1993–1994)
José Manuel Torres Couto	Socialist Party	SOC (1989–1993); PES (1993–1994)
Fernando Gomes (1989–1993)	Socialist Party	SOC (1989–1993); PES (1993–1994)
António Coimbra Martins	Socialist Party	SOC (1989–1993); PES (1993–1994)
Artur da Cunha Oliveira	Socialist Party	SOC (1989–1993); PES (1993–1994)
Fernando Luís Marinho	Socialist Party	SOC (1989–1993); PES (1993–1994)
Maria Belo	Socialist Party	SOC (1989–1993); PES (1993–1994)
José Apolinário (1993–1994)	Socialist Party	SOC (1989–1993); PES (1993–1994)
Pedro Canavarro	Democratic Renewal Party	SOC (1989–1991); RBW (1991–1994)
Carlos Carvalhas (1989–1990)	Portuguese Communist Party	LU
Joaquim Miranda	Portuguese Communist Party	LU
José Barros Moura (1989–1991)	Portuguese Communist Party	LU
Sérgio Ribeiro (1990–1994)	Portuguese Communist Party	LU
Rogério Brito (1991–1993)	Portuguese Communist Party	LU
José Barata-Moura (1993–1994)	Portuguese Communist Party	LU
Maria Amélia Santos	Ecologist Party "The Greens" (1989–1991); Independent (1991–1994)	G (1989–1991); SOC (1991–1993); PES (1993–1994)
Francisco Lucas Pires	Democratic and Social Centre (1989–1993); Independent (1993–1994)	EPP
Luís Beirôco	Democratic and Social Centre (1989–1993); Independent (1993–1994)	EPP
José Carvalho Cardoso	Democratic and Social Centre (1989–1993); Independent (1993–1994)	EPP

== See also ==
- 1989 European Parliament election in Portugal
