= Portalegre (Assembly of the Republic constituency) =

Constituency of the Assembly of the Republic, the national legislature of Portugal

- Constituency for the Assembly of the Republic
- Location of Portalegre within Portugal
- District: Portalegre
- Population: 103,566 (2024)
- Electorate: 90,045 (2025)
- Area: 6,084 km^{2} (2024)

Current Constituency
- Created: 1976
- Seats: List: 2 (2005–present); 3 (1985–2005); 4 (1976–1985)
- Deputies: List: João Aleixo (CH); Luís Moreira Testa (PS)

Portalegre is one of the 22 multi-member constituencies of the Assembly of the Republic, the national legislature of Portugal. The constituency was established in 1976 when the Assembly of the Republic was established by the constitution following the restoration of democracy. It is conterminous with the district of Portalegre. The constituency currently elects two of the 230 members of the Assembly of the Republic using the closed party-list proportional representation electoral system. At the 2025 legislative election it had 90,045 registered electors.

== Electoral system ==
Portalegre currently elects two of the 230 members of the Assembly of the Republic using the closed party-list proportional representation electoral system. Seats are allocated using the D'Hondt method.

== Election results ==
=== Summary ===
Election	Unitary Democrats CDU / APU / PCP			Left Bloc BE / UDP			LIVRE L			Socialists PS / FRS			People Animals Nature PAN			Democratic Renewal PRD			Social Democrats PSD / PàF / AD / PPD			Liberals IL			CDS – People's CDS–PP / CDS			Chega CH / PPV/CDC / PPV		
Election	Votes	%	Seats	Votes	%	Seats	Votes	%	Seats	Votes	%	Seats	Votes	%	Seats	Votes	%	Seats	Votes	%	Seats	Votes	%	Seats	Votes	%	Seats	Votes	%	Seats
2025	2,933	5.36%	0	716	1.31%	0	965	1.76%	0	15,746	28.79%	1	386	0.71%	0				14,962	27.36%	0	1,078	1.97%	0				16,801	30.72%	1
2024	3,718	6.29%	0	1,894	3.20%	0	873	1.48%	0	20,669	34.96%	1	506	0.86%	0				14,134	23.90%	0	1,155	1.95%	0				14,810	25.05%	1
2022	4,058	7.73%	0	1,550	2.95%	0	295	0.56%	0	25,276	48.18%	2	346	0.66%	0				12,433	23.70%	0	1,115	2.13%	0	635	1.21%	0	6,138	11.70%	0
2019	5,481	11.10%	0	4,165	8.43%	0	291	0.59%	0	23,013	46.59%	2	856	1.73%	0				10,374	21.00%	0	255	0.52%	0	1,961	3.97%	0	1,407	2.85%	0
2015	7,186	12.61%	0	5,420	9.51%	0	190	0.33%	0	25,039	43.94%	1	468	0.82%	0				16,302	28.61%	1									
2011	7,910	13.35%	0	2,753	4.65%	0				19,963	33.69%	1	333	0.56%	0				19,992	33.74%	1				6,265	10.57%	0			
2009	8,510	13.24%	0	7,109	11.06%	0				25,317	39.38%	1							15,763	24.52%	1				5,286	8.22%	0	134	0.21%	0
2005	8,546	12.39%	0	3,216	4.66%	0				38,739	56.17%	2							14,290	20.72%	0				2,988	4.33%	0			
2002	8,492	12.63%	0	1,072	1.59%	0				31,004	46.13%	2							20,955	31.18%	1				4,419	6.57%	0			
1999	10,687	15.29%	0	876	1.25%	0				36,545	52.28%	2							16,068	22.98%	1				4,180	5.98%	0			
1995	11,482	14.24%	0	670	0.83%	0				41,499	51.48%	2							19,272	23.91%	1				5,182	6.43%	0			
1991	12,664	15.52%	0							27,978	34.29%	1				869	1.07%	0	32,490	39.82%	2				2,734	3.35%	0			
1987	18,199	21.48%	1	629	0.74%	0				21,883	25.83%	1				5,517	6.51%	0	32,545	38.41%	1				2,652	3.13%	0			
1985	23,539	25.92%	1	924	1.02%	0				22,155	24.39%	1				17,570	19.35%	0	19,546	21.52%	1				4,603	5.07%	0			
1983	25,615	29.64%	1	482	0.56%	0				34,299	39.69%	2							17,053	19.73%	1				6,715	7.77%	0			
1980	25,907	26.79%	1	658	0.68%	0				32,119	33.22%	1							33,152	34.29%	2									
1979	29,080	30.37%	1	1,723	1.80%	0				29,426	30.73%	1							31,719	33.13%	2									
1976	21,135	23.38%	1	949	1.05%	0				40,238	44.50%	3							9,680	10.71%	0				13,375	14.79%	0			

(Figures in italics represent alliances.)

=== Detailed ===
==== 2020s ====
===== 2025 =====
Results of the 2025 legislative election held on 18 May 2025:

Party		Votes	%	Seats
Chega	CH	16,801	30.72%	1
Socialist Party	PS	15,746	28.79%	1
Democratic Alliance	AD	14,962	27.36%	0
Unitary Democratic Coalition	CDU	2,933	5.36%	0
Liberal Initiative	IL	1,078	1.97%	0
LIVRE	L	965	1.76%	0
Left Bloc	BE	716	1.31%	0
National Democratic Alternative	ADN	601	1.10%	0
People Animals Nature	PAN	386	0.71%	0
Portuguese Workers' Communist Party	PCTP	254	0.46%	0
React, Include, Recycle	RIR	79	0.14%	0
Volt Portugal	Volt	71	0.13%	0
Ergue-te	E	51	0.09%	0
People's Monarchist Party	PPM	45	0.08%	0
Valid votes		54,688	100.00%	2
Blank votes		808	1.44%	
Rejected votes – other		587	1.05%	
Total polled		56,083	62.28%	
Registered electors		90,045		

The following candidates were elected:: João Aleixo (CH); and Luís Moreira Testa (PS).

===== 2024 =====
Results of the 2024 legislative election held on 10 March 2024:

Party		Votes	%	Seats
Socialist Party	PS	20,669	34.96%	1
Chega	CH	14,810	25.05%	1
Democratic Alliance	AD	14,134	23.90%	0
Unitary Democratic Coalition	CDU	3,718	6.29%	0
Left Bloc	BE	1,894	3.20%	0
Liberal Initiative	IL	1,155	1.95%	0
LIVRE	L	873	1.48%	0
National Democratic Alternative	ADN	631	1.07%	0
People Animals Nature	PAN	506	0.86%	0
Portuguese Workers' Communist Party	PCTP	303	0.51%	0
React, Include, Recycle	RIR	176	0.30%	0
New Right	ND	121	0.20%	0
Ergue-te	E	55	0.09%	0
Volt Portugal	Volt	53	0.09%	0
Alternative 21 (Earth Party and Alliance)	PT-A	31	0.05%	0
Valid votes		59,129	100.00%	2
Blank votes		925	1.52%	
Rejected votes – other		614	1.01%	
Total polled		60,668	65.16%	
Registered electors		93,106		

The following candidates were elected: Henrique Rocha de Freitas (CH); and Ricardo Pinheiro (PS).

===== 2022 =====
Results of the 2022 legislative election held on 30 January 2022:

Party		Votes	%	Seats
Socialist Party	PS	25,276	48.18%	2
Social Democratic Party	PSD	12,433	23.70%	0
Chega	CH	6,138	11.70%	0
Unitary Democratic Coalition	CDU	4,058	7.73%	0
Left Bloc	BE	1,550	2.95%	0
Liberal Initiative	IL	1,115	2.13%	0
CDS – People's Party	CDS–PP	635	1.21%	0
People Animals Nature	PAN	346	0.66%	0
Portuguese Workers' Communist Party	PCTP	304	0.58%	0
LIVRE	L	295	0.56%	0
React, Include, Recycle	RIR	123	0.23%	0
Earth Party	PT	50	0.10%	0
Socialist Alternative Movement	MAS	48	0.09%	0
Ergue-te	E	43	0.08%	0
Volt Portugal	Volt	35	0.07%	0
Portuguese Labour Party	PTP	16	0.03%	0
Valid votes		52,465	100.00%	2
Blank votes		601	1.12%	
Rejected votes – other		456	0.85%	
Total polled		53,522	56.71%	
Registered electors		94,374		

The following candidates were elected: Eduardo Alves (PS); and Ricardo Pinheiro (PS).

==== 2010s ====
===== 2019 =====
Results of the 2019 legislative election held on 6 October 2019:

Party		Votes	%	Seats
Socialist Party	PS	23,013	46.59%	2
Social Democratic Party	PSD	10,374	21.00%	0
Unitary Democratic Coalition	CDU	5,481	11.10%	0
Left Bloc	BE	4,165	8.43%	0
CDS – People's Party	CDS–PP	1,961	3.97%	0
Chega	CH	1,407	2.85%	0
People Animals Nature	PAN	856	1.73%	0
Portuguese Workers' Communist Party	PCTP	628	1.27%	0
LIVRE	L	291	0.59%	0
Alliance	A	269	0.54%	0
Liberal Initiative	IL	255	0.52%	0
React, Include, Recycle	RIR	208	0.42%	0
National Renewal Party	PNR	156	0.32%	0
United Party of Retirees and Pensioners	PURP	114	0.23%	0
Earth Party	PT	93	0.19%	0
Democratic Republican Party	PDR	68	0.14%	0
Portuguese Labour Party	PTP	61	0.12%	0
Valid votes		49,400	100.00%	2
Blank votes		1,206	2.34%	
Rejected votes – other		996	1.93%	
Total polled		51,602	54.19%	
Registered electors		95,223		

The following candidates were elected: Ricardo Pinheiro (PS); and Luís Moreira Testa (PS).

===== 2015 =====
Results of the 2015 legislative election held on 4 October 2015:

Party		Votes	%	Seats
Socialist Party	PS	25,039	43.94%	1
Portugal Ahead	PàF	16,302	28.61%	1
Unitary Democratic Coalition	CDU	7,186	12.61%	0
Left Bloc	BE	5,420	9.51%	0
Portuguese Workers' Communist Party	PCTP	1,001	1.76%	0
People Animals Nature	PAN	468	0.82%	0
Democratic Republican Party	PDR	327	0.57%	0
National Renewal Party	PNR	217	0.38%	0
ACT! (Portuguese Labour Party and Socialist Alternative Movement)	AGIR	210	0.37%	0
LIVRE	L	190	0.33%	0
People's Monarchist Party	PPM	183	0.32%	0
The Earth Party Movement	MPT	154	0.27%	0
United Party of Retirees and Pensioners	PURP	147	0.26%	0
We, the Citizens!	NC	144	0.25%	0
Valid votes		56,988	100.00%	2
Blank votes		1,134	1.92%	
Rejected votes – other		889	1.51%	
Total polled		59,011	58.32%	
Registered electors		101,179		

The following candidates were elected: Cristóvão Crespo (PàF); and Luís Moreira Testa (PS).

===== 2011 =====
Results of the 2011 legislative election held on 5 June 2011:

Party		Votes	%	Seats
Social Democratic Party	PSD	19,992	33.74%	1
Socialist Party	PS	19,963	33.69%	1
Unitary Democratic Coalition	CDU	7,910	13.35%	0
CDS – People's Party	CDS–PP	6,265	10.57%	0
Left Bloc	BE	2,753	4.65%	0
Portuguese Workers' Communist Party	PCTP	1,031	1.74%	0
Party for Animals and Nature	PAN	333	0.56%	0
Hope for Portugal Movement	MEP	227	0.38%	0
The Earth Party Movement	MPT	176	0.30%	0
Portuguese Labour Party	PTP	162	0.27%	0
National Renewal Party	PNR	151	0.25%	0
People's Monarchist Party	PPM	135	0.23%	0
Humanist Party	PH	80	0.14%	0
Workers' Party of Socialist Unity	POUS	80	0.14%	0
Valid votes		59,258	100.00%	2
Blank votes		1,536	2.49%	
Rejected votes – other		814	1.32%	
Total polled		61,608	57.88%	
Registered electors		106,440		

The following candidates were elected: Cristóvão Crespo (PSD); and Pedro Jesus Marques (PS).

==== 2000s ====
===== 2009 =====
Results of the 2009 legislative election held on 27 September 2009:

Party		Votes	%	Seats
Socialist Party	PS	25,317	39.38%	1
Social Democratic Party	PSD	15,763	24.52%	1
Unitary Democratic Coalition	CDU	8,510	13.24%	0
Left Bloc	BE	7,109	11.06%	0
CDS – People's Party	CDS–PP	5,286	8.22%	0
Portuguese Workers' Communist Party	PCTP	1,316	2.05%	0
People's Monarchist Party	PPM	174	0.27%	0
Hope for Portugal Movement	MEP	151	0.23%	0
Merit and Society Movement	MMS	151	0.23%	0
National Renewal Party	PNR	151	0.23%	0
The Earth Party Movement and Humanist Party	MPT-PH	147	0.23%	0
Pro-Life Party	PPV	134	0.21%	0
Workers' Party of Socialist Unity	POUS	78	0.12%	0
Valid votes		64,287	100.00%	2
Blank votes		1,078	1.63%	
Rejected votes – other		755	1.14%	
Total polled		66,120	60.87%	
Registered electors		108,627		

The following candidates were elected: Miranda Calha (PS); and Cristóvão Crespo (PSD).

===== 2005 =====
Results of the 2005 legislative election held on 20 February 2005:

Party		Votes	%	Seats
Socialist Party	PS	38,739	56.17%	2
Social Democratic Party	PSD	14,290	20.72%	0
Unitary Democratic Coalition	CDU	8,546	12.39%	0
Left Bloc	BE	3,216	4.66%	0
CDS – People's Party	CDS–PP	2,988	4.33%	0
Portuguese Workers' Communist Party	PCTP	618	0.90%	0
New Democracy Party	ND	239	0.35%	0
Humanist Party	PH	203	0.29%	0
National Renewal Party	PNR	126	0.18%	0
Valid votes		68,965	100.00%	2
Blank votes		1,002	1.42%	
Rejected votes – other		653	0.92%	
Total polled		70,620	65.33%	
Registered electors		108,096		

The following candidates were elected: Miranda Calha (PS); and Ceia da Silva (PS).

===== 2002 =====
Results of the 2002 legislative election held on 17 March 2002:

Party		Votes	%	Seats
Socialist Party	PS	31,004	46.13%	2
Social Democratic Party	PSD	20,955	31.18%	1
Unitary Democratic Coalition	CDU	8,492	12.63%	0
CDS – People's Party	CDS–PP	4,419	6.57%	0
Left Bloc	BE	1,072	1.59%	0
Portuguese Workers' Communist Party	PCTP	764	1.14%	0
People's Monarchist Party	PPM	219	0.33%	0
Humanist Party	PH	146	0.22%	0
The Earth Party Movement	MPT	140	0.21%	0
Valid votes		67,211	100.00%	3
Blank votes		631	0.92%	
Rejected votes – other		591	0.86%	
Total polled		68,433	61.86%	
Registered electors		110,624		

The following candidates were elected: Maria Leonor Beleza (PSD); Miranda Calha (PS); and Zelinda Marouço Semedo (PS).

==== 1990s ====
===== 1999 =====
Results of the 1999 legislative election held on 10 October 1999:

Party		Votes	%	Seats
Socialist Party	PS	36,545	52.28%	2
Social Democratic Party	PSD	16,068	22.98%	1
Unitary Democratic Coalition	CDU	10,687	15.29%	0
CDS – People's Party	CDS–PP	4,180	5.98%	0
Portuguese Workers' Communist Party	PCTP	899	1.29%	0
Left Bloc	BE	876	1.25%	0
People's Monarchist Party	PPM	277	0.40%	0
The Earth Party Movement	MPT	256	0.37%	0
National Solidarity Party	PSN	120	0.17%	0
Valid votes		69,908	100.00%	3
Blank votes		764	1.07%	
Rejected votes – other		676	0.95%	
Total polled		71,348	63.71%	
Registered electors		111,994		

The following candidates were elected: João Galinha Barreto (PS); Miranda Calha (PS); and João Maçãs (PSD).

===== 1995 =====
Results of the 1995 legislative election held on 1 October 1995:

Party		Votes	%	Seats
Socialist Party	PS	41,499	51.48%	2
Social Democratic Party	PSD	19,272	23.91%	1
Unitary Democratic Coalition	CDU	11,482	14.24%	0
CDS – People's Party	CDS–PP	5,182	6.43%	0
Portuguese Workers' Communist Party	PCTP	1,542	1.91%	0
Popular Democratic Union	UDP	670	0.83%	0
National Solidarity Party	PSN	359	0.45%	0
Revolutionary Socialist Party	PSR	340	0.42%	0
The Earth Party Movement	MPT	271	0.34%	0
Valid votes		80,617	100.00%	3
Blank votes		708	0.86%	
Rejected votes – other		923	1.12%	
Total polled		82,248	71.27%	
Registered electors		115,402		

The following candidates were elected: Miranda Calha (PS); Francisco Camilo (PS); and Artur Torres Pereira (PSD).

===== 1991 =====
Results of the 1991 legislative election held on 6 October 1991:

Party		Votes	%	Seats
Social Democratic Party	PSD	32,490	39.82%	2
Socialist Party	PS	27,978	34.29%	1
Unitary Democratic Coalition	CDU	12,664	15.52%	0
Social Democratic Centre Party	CDS	2,734	3.35%	0
National Solidarity Party	PSN	1,512	1.85%	0
Portuguese Workers' Communist Party	PCTP	1,446	1.77%	0
Revolutionary Socialist Party	PSR	1,431	1.75%	0
Democratic Renewal Party	PRD	869	1.07%	0
People's Monarchist Party	PPM	458	0.56%	0
Valid votes		81,582	100.00%	3
Blank votes		923	1.11%	
Rejected votes – other		955	1.14%	
Total polled		83,460	71.28%	
Registered electors		117,081		

The following candidates were elected: Miranda Calha (PS); João Maçãs (PSD); and Maria da Conceição Rodrigues (PSD).

==== 1980s ====
===== 1987 =====
Results of the 1987 legislative election held on 19 July 1987:

Party		Votes	%	Seats
Social Democratic Party	PSD	32,545	38.41%	1
Socialist Party	PS	21,883	25.83%	1
Unitary Democratic Coalition	CDU	18,199	21.48%	1
Democratic Renewal Party	PRD	5,517	6.51%	0
Social Democratic Centre Party	CDS	2,652	3.13%	0
Revolutionary Socialist Party	PSR	727	0.86%	0
Popular Democratic Union	UDP	629	0.74%	0
Portuguese Democratic Movement	MDP	599	0.71%	0
Portuguese Workers' Communist Party	PCTP	596	0.70%	0
Communist Party (Reconstructed)	PC(R)	512	0.60%	0
Christian Democratic Party	PDC	478	0.56%	0
People's Monarchist Party	PPM	394	0.47%	0
Valid votes		84,731	100.00%	3
Blank votes		1,199	1.38%	
Rejected votes – other		1,122	1.29%	
Total polled		87,052	74.93%	
Registered electors		116,177		

The following candidates were elected: Miranda Calha (PS); Diamantino Dias (CDU); and João Maçãs (PSD).

===== 1985 =====
Results of the 1985 legislative election held on 6 October 1985:

Party		Votes	%	Seats
United People Alliance	APU	23,539	25.92%	1
Socialist Party	PS	22,155	24.39%	1
Social Democratic Party	PSD	19,546	21.52%	1
Democratic Renewal Party	PRD	17,570	19.35%	0
Social Democratic Centre Party	CDS	4,603	5.07%	0
Popular Democratic Union	UDP	924	1.02%	0
Revolutionary Socialist Party	PSR	834	0.92%	0
Christian Democratic Party	PDC	531	0.58%	0
Portuguese Workers' Communist Party	PCTP	426	0.47%	0
Communist Party (Reconstructed)	PC(R)	387	0.43%	0
Workers' Party of Socialist Unity	POUS	308	0.34%	0
Valid votes		90,823	100.00%	3
Blank votes		1,193	1.27%	
Rejected votes – other		1,592	1.70%	
Total polled		93,608	80.62%	
Registered electors		116,111		

The following candidates were elected: Miranda Calha (PS); Malato Correia (PSD); and Joaquim Miranda (APU).

===== 1983 =====
Results of the 1983 legislative election held on 25 April 1983:

Party		Votes	%	Seats
Socialist Party	PS	34,299	39.69%	2
United People Alliance	APU	25,615	29.64%	1
Social Democratic Party	PSD	17,053	19.73%	1
Social Democratic Centre Party	CDS	6,715	7.77%	0
Revolutionary Socialist Party	PSR	656	0.76%	0
Workers' Party of Socialist Unity	POUS	509	0.59%	0
Popular Democratic Union	UDP	482	0.56%	0
Christian Democratic Party	PDC	448	0.52%	0
Portuguese Workers' Communist Party	PCTP	397	0.46%	0
Socialist Workers League	LST	247	0.29%	0
Valid votes		86,421	100.00%	4
Blank votes		842	0.94%	
Rejected votes – other		1,943	2.18%	
Total polled		89,206	82.40%	
Registered electors		108,256		

The following candidates were elected: Miranda Calha (PS); Malato Correia (PSD); Joaquim Miranda (APU); and Gil Romão (PS).

===== 1980 =====
Results of the 1980 legislative election held on 5 October 1980:

Party		Votes	%	Seats
Democratic Alliance	AD	33,152	34.29%	2
Republican and Socialist Front	FRS	32,119	33.22%	1
United People Alliance	APU	25,907	26.79%	1
Workers' Party of Socialist Unity	POUS	1,770	1.83%	0
Revolutionary Socialist Party	PSR	1,338	1.38%	0
Portuguese Workers' Communist Party	PCTP	770	0.80%	0
Labour Party	PT	760	0.79%	0
Popular Democratic Union	UDP	658	0.68%	0
Christian Democratic Party, Independent Movement for the National Reconstruction / Party of the Portuguese Right and National Front	PDC- MIRN/ PDP- FN	220	0.23%	0
Valid votes		96,694	100.00%	4
Blank votes		747	0.75%	
Rejected votes – other		1,733	1.75%	
Total polled		99,174	88.18%	
Registered electors		112,472		

The following candidates were elected: José Manuel Barradas (AD); Miranda Calha (FRS); José Manuel Casqueiro (AD); and Joaquim Miranda (APU).

==== 1970s ====
===== 1979 =====
Results of the 1979 legislative election held on 2 December 1979:

Party		Votes	%	Seats
Democratic Alliance	AD	31,719	33.13%	2
Socialist Party	PS	29,426	30.73%	1
United People Alliance	APU	29,080	30.37%	1
Popular Democratic Union	UDP	1,723	1.80%	0
Portuguese Workers' Communist Party	PCTP	1,252	1.31%	0
Revolutionary Socialist Party	PSR	1,016	1.06%	0
Christian Democratic Party	PDC	853	0.89%	0
Left-wing Union for the Socialist Democracy	UEDS	683	0.71%	0
Valid votes		95,752	100.00%	4
Blank votes		1,106	1.12%	
Rejected votes – other		2,066	2.09%	
Total polled		98,924	89.14%	
Registered electors		110,975		

The following candidates were elected: Miranda Calha (PS); José Manuel Casqueiro (AD); Malato Correia (AD); and Joaquim Miranda (APU).

===== 1976 =====
Results of the 1976 legislative election held on 25 April 1976:

Party		Votes	%	Seats
Socialist Party	PS	40,238	44.50%	3
Portuguese Communist Party	PCP	21,135	23.38%	1
Social Democratic Centre Party	CDS	13,375	14.79%	0
Democratic People's Party	PPD	9,680	10.71%	0
People's Socialist Front	FSP	1,004	1.11%	0
Popular Democratic Union	UDP	949	1.05%	0
Movement of Socialist Left	MES	934	1.03%	0
Internationalist Communist League	LCI	734	0.81%	0
Christian Democratic Party	PDC	630	0.70%	0
Worker–Peasant Alliance	AOC	598	0.66%	0
People's Monarchist Party	PPM	475	0.53%	0
Re-Organized Movement of the Party of the Proletariat	MRPP	352	0.39%	0
Communist Party of Portugal (Marxist–Leninist)	PCP(ML)	309	0.34%	0
Valid votes		90,413	100.00%	4
Rejected votes		5,643	5.87%	
Total polled		96,056	86.89%	
Registered electors		110,543		

The following candidates were elected: Miranda Calha (PS); Nicolau Dias Ferreira (PCP); Luis Cidade Moura (PS); and António Pinheiro Silva (PS).
