= List of members of the European Parliament for Portugal, 1994–1999 =

This is a list of the 25 members of the European Parliament for Portugal in the 1994 to 1999 session.

== List ==
Name	National party	EP group
António Vitorino (1994–1995)	Socialist Party	PES
João Soares (1994–1995)	Socialist Party	PES
Fernando Luís Marinho	Socialist Party	PES
José Manuel Torres Couto	Socialist Party	PES
José Barros Moura	Socialist Party	PES
Carlos Cardoso Lage	Socialist Party	PES
António Campos	Socialist Party	PES
Helena Torres Marques	Socialist Party	PES
José Apolinário (1994–1998)	Socialist Party	PES
Fernando Moniz	Socialist Party	PES
Carlos Candal (1995–1999)	Socialist Party	PES
Quinídio Correia (1995–1999)	Socialist Party	PES
Elisa Maria Damião (1998–1999)	Socialist Party	PES
Eurico de Melo	Social Democratic Party	LDR (1994–1996); EPP (1996–1999)
António Capucho (1994–1998)	Social Democratic Party	LDR (1994–1996); EPP (1996–1999)
Arlindo Cunha	Social Democratic Party	LDR (1994–1996); EPP (1996–1999)
Francisco Lucas Pires (1994–1998)	Social Democratic Party	LDR (1994–1996); EPP (1996–1999)
Carlos Pimenta	Social Democratic Party	LDR (1994–1996); EPP (1996–1999)
Manuel Porto	Social Democratic Party	LDR (1994–1996); EPP (1996–1999)
Helena Vaz da Silva	Social Democratic Party	LDR (1994–1996); EPP (1996–1999)
Carlos Costa Neves	Social Democratic Party	LDR (1994–1996); EPP (1996–1999)
Nélio Mendonça	Social Democratic Party	LDR (1994–1996); EPP (1996–1999)
José Mendes Bota (1998–1999)	Social Democratic Party	LDR (1994–1996); EPP (1996–1999)
Carlos Coelho (1998–1999)	Social Democratic Party	LDR (1994–1996); EPP (1996–1999)
Manuel Monteiro (1994–1995)	People's Party	UEN
Raul Rosado Fernandes	People's Party	UEN
José Girão Pereira	People's Party	UEN
Rui Vieira (1995–1997)	People's Party	UEN
Celeste Cardona (1997–1999)	People's Party	UEN
Luís Sá (1994)	Portuguese Communist Party	EUL (1994–1995); EUL–NGL (1995–1999)
Joaquim Miranda	Portuguese Communist Party	EUL (1994–1995); EUL–NGL (1995–1999)
Sérgio Ribeiro	Portuguese Communist Party	EUL (1994–1995); EUL–NGL (1995–1999)
Honório Novo (1994–1999)	Portuguese Communist Party	EUL (1994–1995); EUL–NGL (1995–1999)
