= List of members of the European Parliament for Portugal, 1987–1989 =

This is a list of the 24 members of the European Parliament for Portugal in the 1984 to 1989 session.

== List ==
Name	National party	EP Group
Pedro Santana Lopes	Social Democratic Party	LDR
Rui Amaral	Social Democratic Party	LDR
Manuel Pereira	Social Democratic Party	LDR
Carlos Pimenta	Social Democratic Party	LDR
Vasco Garcia	Social Democratic Party	LDR
António Figueiredo Lopes (1987–1988)	Social Democratic Party	LDR
Virgílio Pereira	Social Democratic Party	LDR
António Marques Mendes	Social Democratic Party	LDR
Fernando Condesso	Social Democratic Party	LDR
Pedro Augusto Pinto	Social Democratic Party	LDR
António Lacerda de Queiróz (1988–1989)	Social Democratic Party	LDR
Maria de Lourdes Pintasilgo	Socialist Party	SOC
Luís Filipe Madeira	Socialist Party	SOC
António Coimbra Martins	Socialist Party	SOC
Fernando Gomes	Socialist Party	SOC
Jorge Campinos (1987–1988)	Socialist Party	SOC
Fernando Luís Marinho	Socialist Party	SOC
Maria Belo (1988–1989)	Socialist Party	SOC
Francisco Lucas Pires	Democratic and Social Centre	EPP
Miguel Anacoreta Correia (1987)	Democratic and Social Centre	EPP
José Carvalho Cardoso	Democratic and Social Centre	EPP
Francisco Gentil Martins (1987)	Democratic and Social Centre	EPP
José Augusto Gama (1987–1989)	Democratic and Social Centre	EPP
Manuel dos Santos Machado (1987–1989)	Democratic and Social Centre	EPP
Ângelo Veloso (1987)	Portuguese Communist Party	COM
Joaquim Miranda	Portuguese Communist Party	COM
José Barros Moura	Portuguese Communist Party	COM
Carlos Aboim Inglez (1987–1989)	Portuguese Communist Party	COM
José Medeiros Ferreira	Democratic Renewal Party (1987); Independent (1987–1989)	SOC
