= Catasta =

Catasta is a surname.

== People with the surname ==
- Anna Catasta (born 1952), Italian politician
- Romolo Catasta (1923–1985), Italian rower

== See also ==
- Catastalsis
- Catastasis
