= Filipa Roseta =

Portuguese politician

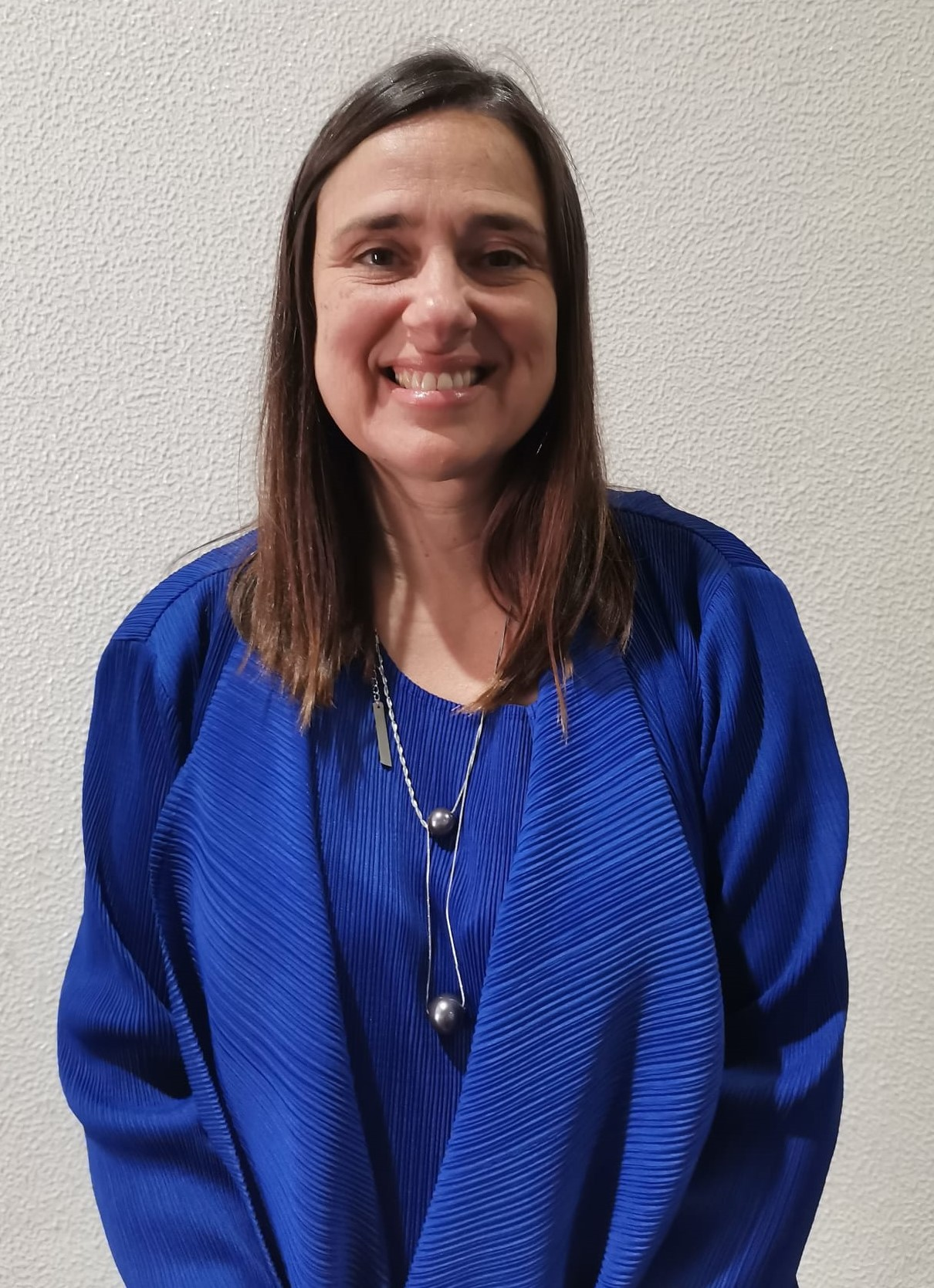
- Filipa Roseta in 2022

Member of the Lisbon City Council for Housing, Local Development and Municipal Infrastructure
- Incumbent
- Assumed office 18 October 2021
- President: Carlos Moedas

Member of the Assembly of the Republic
- In office 25 October 2019 – 26 September 2021
- Constituency: Lisbon

Member of the Cascais City Council
- In office 1 October 2017 – 24 October 2019

Member of the Cascais Municipal Assembly
- In office 29 September 2013 – 30 September 2017

Personal details
- Born: Filipa Maria Salema Roseta; 9 March 1973 (age 53) Lisbon, Portugal
- Party: Social Democratic Party (2012–present)
- Spouse: Francisco Vaz Monteiro
- Children: 2
- Parent(s): Helena Roseta (mother); Pedro Roseta (father)
- Relatives: Cuca Roseta (cousin); Guilherme d'Oliveira Martins (uncle); Margarida Salema (aunt)
- Education: University of Lisbon
- Occupation: Architect Academic • Politician

Filipa Maria Salema Roseta Vaz Monteiro (born 9 March 1973) is a Portuguese architect and politician. Between 2019 and 2021, she was a Member of the Assembly of the Republic, elected by the Portuguese Social Democratic Party for the Lisbon constituency. She is also a university Professor in the University of Lisbon.

She is the daughter of two former politicians, Pedro Roseta, a former MP and former Portuguese Minister of Culture and Helena Roseta, also a former MP, first for the Social Democratic Party, where she had prominent roles and as an Independent MP, elected for the Portuguese Socialist Party (PS).

On 25 October 2021, Roseta resigned as a Member of Parliament to become a full-time Executive Council Member in Lisbon for the term 2021–2025. She was part of the political coalition "Novos Tempos" led by the former European Commissioner Carlos Moedas. As an Executive Council Member, she is responsible for Housing, Local Development and Municipal Works policies in Lisbon.
