= List of members of the European Parliament for the Netherlands, 1989–1994 =

Below is a list of the 25 members of the European Parliament for the Netherlands in the 1989 to 1994 session.

== Party representation ==
National party	EP Group	Seats	±
Christian Democratic Appeal	EPP	10 / 25	1 ▲
Labour Party	SOC	8 / 25	0
People's Party for Freedom and Democracy	LDR	3 / 25	2 ▼
Rainbow (ppr-psp-cpn-evp-gpn-indep.)	RBW	2 / 25	0
Democrats 66	LDR	1 / 25	1 ▲
SGP, GPV and RPF	NI	1 / 25	0

== Mutations ==
=== 1989 ===
- 15 June: Election for the European Parliament in the Netherlands.
- 24 July: Begin 3rd European Parliament session. (1989–1994)
- 6 November: Hanja Maij-Weggen (CDA) leaves the European Parliament, because he became a minister in the Third Lubbers cabinet.
- 7 November: Hedy d'Ancona (PvdA) leaves the European Parliament, because he became a minister in the Third Lubbers cabinet.
- 7 November: Piet Dankert (PvdA) leaves the European Parliament, because he became an Undersecretary in the Third Lubbers cabinet.
- 20 November: Bartho Pronk (CDA) is installed in the European Parliament as a replacement for Hanja Maij-Weggen.
- 20 November: Mathilde van den Brink and Annemarie Goedmakers both from the Labour Party are installed in the European Parliament as a replacement for Hedy d'Ancona and Piet Dankert.

== Alphabetical ==
MEPs for the Netherlands elected to the 3rd European Parliament session
1989–1994
Name	Sex	National party	EP Group	Period	Preference vote
Hedy d'Ancona	Female	Labour Party	SOC	24 July 1984 – 7 November 1989	
Jan-Willem Bertens	Male	Democrats 66	LDR	24 July 1989 – 20 July 1999	
Bouke Beumer	Male	Christian Democratic Appeal	EPP	17 July 1979 – 19 July 1994	
Mathilde van den Brink	Female	Labour Party	SOC	20 November 1989 – 19 July 1994	
Pam Cornelissen	Male	Christian Democratic Appeal	EPP	24 July 1984 – 20 July 1999	
Piet Dankert	Male	Labour Party	SOC	17 July 1979 – 7 November 1989	
Nel van Dijk	Female	Communist Party of the Netherlands	RBW	January 1987 – 1 September 1998	
Annemarie Goedmakers	Female	Labour Party	SOC	20 November 1989 – 19 July 1994	
Jim Janssen van Raaij	Male	Christian Democratic Appeal	EPP	17 July 1979 – 24 July 1984; October 1986 – 20 July 1999	
Jessica Larive	Female	People's Party for Freedom and Democracy	LDR	24 July 1984 – 20 July 1999	
Hanja Maij-Weggen	Female	Christian Democratic Appeal	EPP	17 July 1979 – 6 November 1989	
Alman Metten	Male	Labour Party	SOC	24 July 1984 – 20 July 1999	
Hemmo Muntingh	Male	Labour Party	SOC	17 July 1979 – 19 July 1994	
Ria Oomen-Ruijten	Female	Christian Democratic Appeal	EPP	25 July 1989 – 1 July 2014	
Arie Oostlander	Male	Christian Democratic Appeal	EPP	25 July 1989 – 20 July 2004	
Karla Peijs	Female	Christian Democratic Appeal	EPP	25 July 1989 – 27 May 2003	
Jean Penders	Male	Christian Democratic Appeal	EPP	17 July 1979 – 19 July 1994	
Bartho Pronk	Male	Christian Democratic Appeal	EPP	20 November 1989 – 20 July 2004	
Maartje van Putten	Female	Labour Party	SOC	25 July 1989 – 20 July 1999	
Jan Sonneveld	Male	Christian Democratic Appeal	EPP	25 July 1989 – 20 July 1999	
Wim van Velzen	Male	Labour Party	SOC	25 July 1989 – 20 July 1999	
Herman Verbeek	Male	Political Party of Radicals	RBW	25 July 1989 – 19 July 1994	
Maxime Verhagen	Male	Christian Democratic Appeal	EPP	25 July 1989 – 19 July 1994	
Ben Visser	Male	Labour Party	SOC	24 July 1984 – 19 July 1994	
Gijs de Vries	Male	People's Party for Freedom and Democracy	LDR	24 July 1984 – 2 August 1998	
Leen van der Waal	Male	Reformed Political Party	NI	24 July 1984 – 2 September 1997	
Florus Wijsenbeek	Male	People's Party for Freedom and Democracy	LDR	24 July 1984 – 20 July 1999	
Eisso Woltjer	Male	Labour Party	SOC	17 July 1979 – 19 July 1994	
