= List of members of the European Parliament for Portugal, 1986–1987 =

This is a list of the 24 appointed delegates of the European Parliament for Portugal in the 1984 to 1989 session (from 1 January 1986 till 13 September 1987), ordered by name. See 1987 European Parliament election in Portugal for the first election results.

== List ==
Name	National party	EP Group
Virgílio Pereira	Social Democratic Party	LDR
Vasco Garcia	Social Democratic Party	LDR
Francisco Pinto Balsemão (1986)	Social Democratic Party	LDR
Rui Almeida Mendes	Social Democratic Party	LDR
Fernando Condesso	Social Democratic Party	LDR
António Lacerda de Queiróz	Social Democratic Party	LDR
Manuel Pereira	Social Democratic Party	LDR
Pedro Augusto Pinto	Social Democratic Party	LDR
José Silva Domingos (1986–1987)	Social Democratic Party	LDR
Rui Amaral (1986–1987)	Social Democratic Party	LDR
José Pereira Lopes (1987)	Social Democratic Party	LDR
Jorge Campinos	Socialist Party	SOC
António Coimbra Martins	Socialist Party	SOC
Rodolfo Crespo	Socialist Party	SOC
Fernando Gomes	Socialist Party	SOC
Luís Filipe Madeira	Socialist Party	SOC
Walter Rosa	Socialist Party	SOC
António José Fernandes	Democratic Renewal Party	SOC
António José Marques Mendes	Democratic Renewal Party	SOC
José Medeiros Ferreira	Democratic Renewal Party	SOC
Jorge Pegado Liz	Democratic Renewal Party	SOC
José Barros Moura	Portuguese Communist Party	COM
José António Brito Apolónia	Portuguese Communist Party	COM
Joaquim Miranda	Portuguese Communist Party	COM
Luís Beirôco	Democratic and Social Centre	EPP
Francisco Lucas Pires	Democratic and Social Centre	EPP
