= FFME =

FFME may refer to:

- Fédération française de la montagne et de l'escalade, the French Federation of Mountaineering and Climbing;
- fr:Fédération française des maisons de l'Europe, a French NGO currently headed by Martine Buron;
- the DS 100 code of Frankfurt Messe station (Bahnhof Frankfurt am Main Messe), in Germany.
