= Helga Haller von Hallerstein =

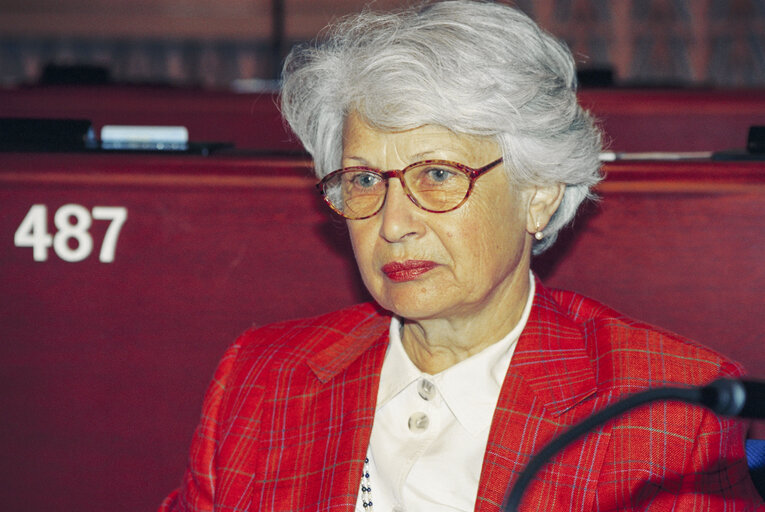

Member of the European Parliament
- In office December 1993 – July 1994

Personal details
- Born: 31 March 1927 Šahy, Czechoslovakia
- Died: 11 May 2017 (aged 90) Frankfurt, Germany
- Party: CDU

Helga Haller von Hallerstein (née Kaulich; 31 March 1927 – 11 May 2017) was a German countess and politician from the Christian Democratic Union of Germany (CDU). She was a member of the European Parliament from December 1993 to July 1994 in the 3rd European Parliament.

== Life ==
Helga Kaulich was born in 1927 in Šahy, Czechoslovakia, and married a member of the noble Haller von Hallerstein family. In 1950, she earned a diploma as a fashion designer.

== Politics ==
Haller von Hallerstein ran for the Hessian CDU state list in the 1989 European Parliament election and succeeded the late MEP Bernhard Sälzer in the European Parliament on 27 December 1993. There she was a member of the EPP Group and the Committee on Energy, Research and Technology, as well as the Delegation for relations with the Czech Republic and the Slovak Republic. She left the Parliament after the 1994 European Parliament election.

From 1973 to 1975 she was a member of the local council 9 in Frankfurt am Main and then a member of the Frankfurt City Council until 1993.

She died in Frankfurt on 11 May 2017.

== See also ==
- List of members of the European Parliament for Germany, 1989–1994
