= Henrique de Freitas =

Portuguese politician

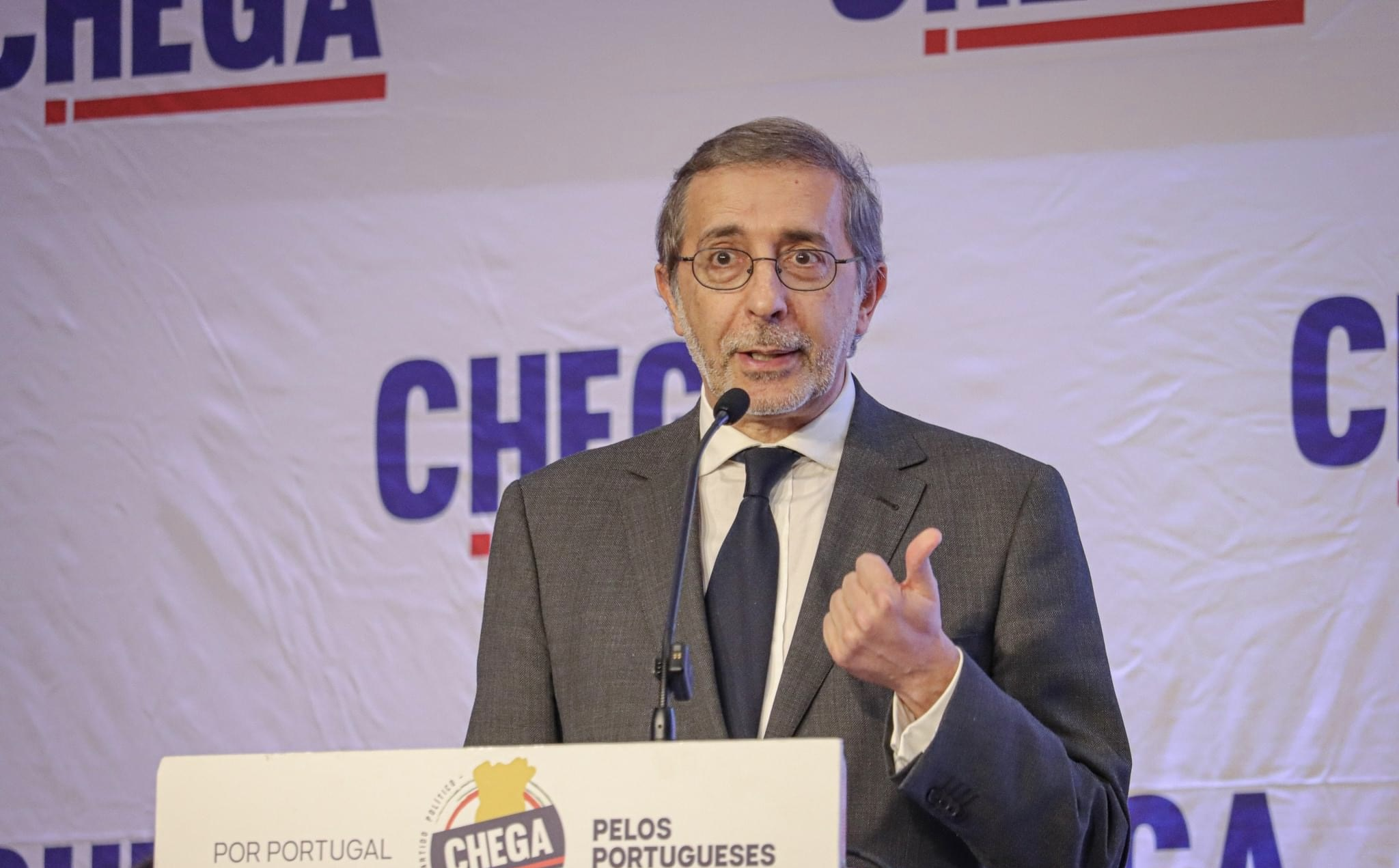
- Freitas in 2024

Member of the Assembly of the Republic
- In office 26 March 2024 – 18 May 2025
- Constituency: Portalegre
- In office 23 October 1999 – 15 October 2009
- Constituency: Lisbon

Secretary of State for Defense and Former Combatants
- In office 6 April 2002 – 17 July 2004
- Prime Minister: José Manuel Barroso
- Minister: Paulo Portas

Secretary of State for Foreign Affairs
- In office 21 July 2004 – 12 March 2005
- Prime Minister: Pedro Santana Lopes
- Minister: António Monteiro

Member of the Lisbon City Council
- In office 1 January 2002 – 1 April 2002

Personal details
- Born: Henrique José Praia da Rocha de Freitas; 13 March 1961 (age 65) Lisbon, Portugal
- Party: Chega (2023–2025)
- Other political affiliations: Social Democratic Party (1979–2023)
- Education: Catholic University of Portugal
- Profession: University teacher

Henrique José Praia da Rocha de Freitas (born 13 March 1961) is a Portuguese politician who served as Secretary of State for Defense and Former Combatants in the XV Constitutional Government, led by José Manuel Barroso.

He has a degree in International Relations from the Lusíada University of Lisbon, and also attended the Law course at the Catholic University. As a member of the Social Democratic Party, at the age of 25 he was elected President of the Parish of Mercês. At the same time, he was a member of the Lisbon Municipal Assembly, where between January and April 2002 he served as a member of the City Council.

In 1999, he was elected as a member of the Assembly of the Republic for Lisbon and remained in the position until 2009. In Parliament, he coordinated the National Defense Commission and was President of the Foreign Affairs, Portuguese Communities and Cooperation Commission. During this same period he was a member of the Parliamentary Assembly of NATO.

While the PSD was in opposition, Henrique de Freitas was part of the party's Shadow Cabinet for the area of Cooperation and Lusophony. However, he ended up being invited to join the Ministry of Defense, as Secretary of State for Defense and Former Combatants, in April 2002, when Durão Barroso became Prime Minister.

In 2010, he was appointed for a period of three years to hold the position of technical advisor - specialized staff from the Ministry of Foreign Affairs, in the Portuguese Delegation to the North Atlantic Treaty Organization, in Brussels.

In the 2011 presidential elections, he supported Manuel Alegre's candidacy. He was also part of the Honor Committee for Alegre's candidacy, supported by the Socialist Party and the Left Bloc.

In January 2023, he joined CHEGA. In 2024, he was confirmed as a candidate for MP in that year's legislative elections for Portalegre.
