= Ricardo Pinheiro =

Portuguese politician (born 1980)

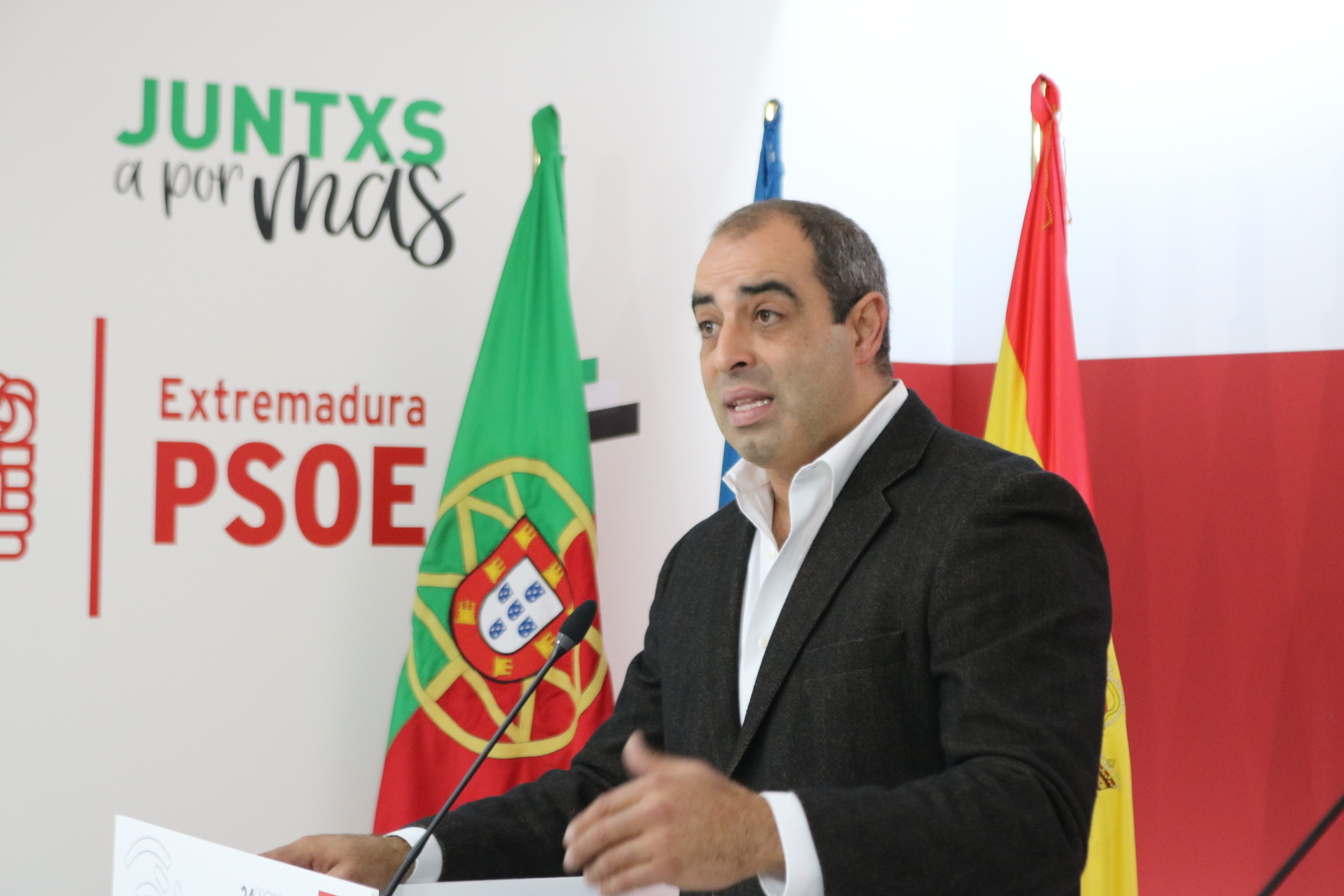
- Pinheiro in 2018

Member of the Assembly of the Republic
- Incumbent
- Assumed office 25 October 2019
- Constituency: Portalegre

Personal details
- Born: 28 August 1980 (age 45)
- Party: Socialist Party

Ricardo Miguel Furtado Pinheiro (born 28 August 1980) is a Portuguese politician serving as a member of the Assembly of the Republic since 2019. From 2009 to 2019, he served as mayor of Campo Maior. From 2017 to 2019, he served as president of Alto Alentejo. From 2020 to 2022, he served as secretary of state for planning.
