= Helena Roseta =

Portuguese architect and politician (born 1947)

Helena Roseta GCL
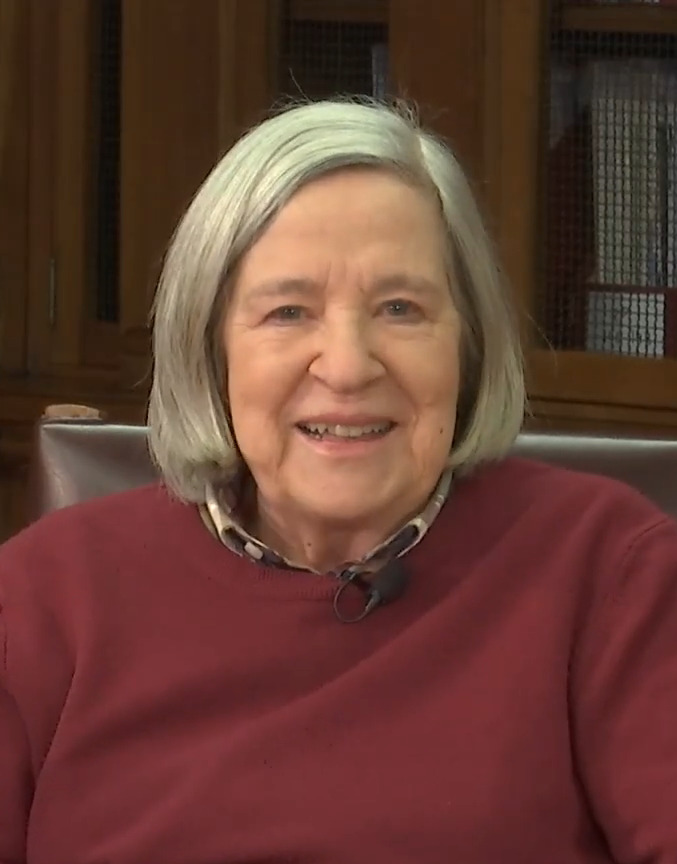
- Roseta in 2025

Member of the Assembly of the Republic
- In office 25 October 2015 – 24 October 2019
- Constituency: Lisbon
- In office 19 July 1987 – 20 February 2005
- Constituency: Porto (1987–1995); Lisbon (1995–2002); Coimbra (2002–2005)
- In office 2 June 1975 – 20 June 1982
- Constituency: Lisbon (1975–1980); Setúbal (1980–1982)

President of the Lisbon Municipal Assembly
- In office 24 October 2013 – 31 October 2019
- Preceded by: Simoneta Luz Afonso
- Succeeded by: José Leitão

Member of the Lisbon City Council
- In office 1 August 2007 – 29 September 2013
- In office 12 December 1976 – 16 December 1979

Mayor of Cascais
- In office 12 December 1982 – 15 December 1985
- Preceded by: Carlos Rosa
- Succeeded by: Georges Dargent

Personal details
- Born: Maria Helena do Rego da Costa Salema; 23 December 1947 (age 78) Lisbon, Portugal
- Party: Independent (2007–present)
- Other political affiliations: Social Democratic Party (1974–1986); Independent (1986–1991); Socialist Party (1991–2007)
- Spouse: Pedro Roseta
- Children: 3, including Filipa Roseta
- Relatives: Cuca Roseta (niece)
- Education: University of Lisbon

Maria Helena do Rego da Costa Salema Roseta (born 23 December 1947) is a Portuguese architect, specialising in improvements to poorer neighbourhoods, and a politician who was a member of the Assembly of the Republic and President of the Lisbon Municipal Assembly and Mayor of Cascais.

== Early life ==
Maria Helena do Rego da Costa Salema Roseta was born in Lisbon on 23 December 1947. She grew up in a family of 7 siblings. A student with excellent grades, she studied at the Maria Amália Vaz de Carvalho secondary school and in 1964/65 was awarded a national prize given to the student with the best grades. After leaving school she went to the School of Fine Arts at the University of Lisbon, where she took a degree in architecture. In 1967, after floods that killed 500 people in the Lisbon region, she became involved with other students to support the flooded areas and publicize the facts, despite the censorship efforts of the authoritarian Estado Novo regime. Her future husband, Pedro Roseta, was another of the students involved. They have three daughters, one of them is Filipa Roseta.

After graduating she worked with several architects, including Nuno Portas, Maurício de Vasconcelos, and Sebastião Formosinho Sanchez. In 1973 she was elected Secretary-General of the National Union of Architects. In the same year she participated in the 3rd Congress of the Democratic Opposition, in Aveiro, where she spoke about housing problems. She was detained by the PIDE, the secret police of the Estado Novo, in the same year.

== Early political involvement ==
After the Carnation Revolution of April 25, 1974, which overthrew the Estado Novo, Roseta joined Portugal's Social Democratic Party (PSD). She was elected to the Constituent Assembly in 1975, and to the Assembly of the Republic in 1976. In the same year she was elected as a councillor for the Lisbon Municipality. In 1978, the PSD formed the Democratic Alliance with other centre-right parties and she was returned to the Assembly in 1979 and 1980 on the Democratic Alliance list. Between 1981 and 1982 she was President of the Parliamentary Commission for European Integration, which prepared Portugal's entry into the European Union, working closely with Simone Veil, the first elected President of the European Parliament. Roseta also ran the official PSD newspaper, Povo Livre (Free People). Between 1982 and 1985 she was the mayor of the municipality of Cascais and in this role she was also to face floods when Cascais was inundated in 1983, with loss of life. In 1986 she decided to support Mário Soares, the candidate of the Portuguese Socialist Party (PS) for President of the Republic. This led to her departure from the PSD and subsequent decision to join the PS.

== Other activities ==
Between 1991 and 1995 Roseta taught the subjects of Urbanism and Citizenship, and Urbanism and Municipalities at the Universidade Lusófona in Lisbon. Between 1995 and 1997 she served as an OECD expert on Urban Sustainability. In 1993, she took over the management of Botequim, a bar in Graça, Lisbon previously owned by the poet and social activist, Natália Correia, who died in that year. Later, she took responsibility for organizing the poet's intellectual estate. In 1998, she promoted the Yes for Tolerance movement during the national referendum on decriminalizing abortion. She chaired the National Council of the Order of Architects from 2001 to 2007. She was the founder of the National Association of Portuguese Municipalities. Since 2018, she has been a member of the Board of the Faculty of Social and Human Sciences of the NOVA University Lisbon and she also works with the same university as a collaborative researcher in the research group on "Cities, Environment and Regional Development".

== Later political life ==
In a break with the PS, she launched the Citizens Movement for Lisbon in 2007. In 2008, the Citizens Movement reached an agreement with the then mayor, António Costa, to work together. Roseta was responsible for drafting the Local Housing Program in Lisbon. In 2009, the Citizens for Lisbon movement ended up in coalition with the PS. She was elected as a councillor, and was given the portfolio of Housing and Social Development. In 2011, she launched the BIP-ZIP Lisbon Programme, which was designed to boost partnerships and small local interventions to improve Lisbon's neighbourhoods by supporting projects carried out by parish councils, associations, local authorities, communities and non-governmental organizations. The programme was given an award by the International Observatory for Participatory Democracy (OIDP).

In 2013, the Citizens for Lisbon movement renewed the coalition agreement with the PS for the municipal elections. Roseta became the President of the Municipal Assembly of Lisbon for the 2013–2017 term. In 2015 she returned to the National Assembly as a representative of the PS. She maintained her position as President of the Lisbon Municipal Assembly in 2017 as a representative of the PS but resigned in October 2019 citing personal reasons and wanting to "change her life". In 2020 she announced that, with the support of António Costa, who had become Prime Minister in 2015, she would be running a programme called "Healthy Neighbourhoods", which consisted of supporting projects for residents of poorer areas. In making the announcement she argued that Portugal lacked a strong public housing policy.

== Awards and honours ==
- Roseta received the Council of Europe Pro-Merito Medal in 1982.
- In 2005 she was awarded the Grand Cross of the Portuguese Order of Liberty.
- In 2016 she was made an Honorary Member of the Assembly of the Republic on the occasion of the 40th anniversary of the Constitution of the Portuguese Republic, to mark her work as a member of the Constituent Assembly.
- In 2019 she was made an honorary member of the Order of Architects of Portugal.
