= Luís Moreira Testa =

Portuguese politician (born 1978)

Member of the Assembly of the Republic
- In office 23 October 2015 – 28 March 2022
- Constituency: Portalegre

Personal details
- Born: 20 January 1978 (age 48)
- Party: Socialist Party

Luís David Trindade Moreira Testa (born 20 January 1978) is a Portuguese politician. He has served as president of the Socialist Party in the Portalegre District since 2022, having previously served from 2012 to 2020. From 2015 to 2022, he was a member of the Assembly of the Republic.
