= Left Unity (European Parliament) =

Former left-wing political group of the European Parliament (1989–1994)

- European Parliament group
- Name: Left Unity
- English abbr.: LU
- French abbr.: CG
- Formal name: Left Unity
- Ideology: Communism
- From: 25 July 1989
- To: 19 July 1994
- Preceded by: Communist and Allies Group
- Succeeded by: Confederal Group of the European United Left
- Chaired by: René-Emile Piquet, Alekos Alavanos, Joaquim Miranda
- MEP(s): 14 (25 July 1989)

Left Unity was a communist political group with seats in the European Parliament between 1989 and 1994.

== History ==
Left Unity was founded on 25 July 1989 with 14 members. It included MEPs from the French Communist Party, the Communist Party of Greece, the Portuguese Communist Party, and the Irish Workers' Party. These parties were generally hostile to Eurocommunism and were influenced by Moscow. After the 1994 elections it became the "Confederal Group of the European United Left" on 19 July 1994.

== Sources ==
- Development of Political Groups in the European Parliament
- Europe Politique
- Democracy in the European Parliament
- European Parliament MEP Archives
