= List of members of the European Parliament for Italy, 1989–1994 =

Members of the European Parliament for Italy
ECSC delegation	(1952)
EP delegation	(1958)
1st term	(1979)
2nd term	(1984)
3rd term	(1989)
4th term	(1994)
5th term	(1999)
6th term	(2004)
7th term	(2009)
8th term	(2014)
9th term	(2019)
10th term	(2024)

There were 81 members of the European Parliament for Italy during the 1989 to 1994 session.

== List ==
Name	National party	EP Group
Adelaide Aglietta	Rainbow Greens	G
Gianfranco Amendola	Federation of Green Lists	G
Gianni Baget Bozzo	Italian Socialist Party	SOC
Roberto Barzanti	Italian Communist Party (Until 11 January 1993) Democratic Party of the Left	UEL (Until 11 January 1993) SOC
Vincenzo Bettiza	Italian Socialist Party	SOC
Rosaria Bindi	Christian Democracy	EPP
Andrea Bonetti	Christian Democracy	EPP
Rinaldo Bontempi	Italian Communist Party (Until 11 January 1993) Democratic Party of the Left	UEL (Until 11 January 1993) SOC
Franco Borgo	Christian Democracy	EPP
Antonio Cariglia	Italian Democratic Socialist Party	SOC
Pierre Carniti	Italian Socialist Party	SOC
Carlo Casini	Christian Democracy	EPP
Maria Luisa Cassanmagnago Cerretti	Christian Democracy	EPP
Luciana Castellina	Italian Communist Party (Until 11 January 1993) Communist Refoundation Party	UEL (Until 11 January 1993) NI
Anna Catasta	Italian Communist Party (Until 11 January 1993) Democratic Party of the Left	UEL (Until 11 January 1993) SOC
Adriana Ceci	Italian Communist Party (Until 11 January 1993) Democratic Party of the Left	UEL (Until 11 January 1993) SOC
Mauro Chiabrando	Christian Democracy	EPP
Luigi Alberto Colajanni	Italian Communist Party (Until 11 January 1993) Democratic Party of the Left	UEL (Until 11 January 1993) SOC
Emilio Colombo (until 1 August 1992) Francesco Lamanna (from 6 October 1992)	Christian Democracy	EPP
Felice Contu	Christian Democracy	EPP
Bettino Craxi (until 30 April 1992) Mario Didò (from 13 May 1992)	Italian Socialist Party	SOC
Joachim Dalsass	South Tyrolean People's Party	EPP
Biagio De Giovanni	Italian Communist Party (Until 11 January 1993) Democratic Party of the Left	UEL (Until 11 January 1993) SOC
Cesare De Picolli	Italian Communist Party (Until 11 January 1993) Democratic Party of the Left	UEL (Until 11 January 1993) SOC
Lorenzo De Vitto (until 27 April 1994) Vito Napoli (from 29 April 1994)	Christian Democracy	EPP
Maurice Duverger	Italian Communist Party (Until 11 January 1993) Democratic Party of the Left	UEL (Until 11 January 1993) SOC
Enrico Falqui	Federation of Green Lists	G
Antonio Fantini	Christian Democracy	EPP
Giulio Fantuzzi	Italian Communist Party (Until 11 January 1993) Democratic Party of the Left	UEL (Until 11 January 1993) SOC
Giuliano Ferrara (until 11 May 1994) Gabriele Panizzi (from 9 May 1994)	Italian Socialist Party	SOC
Enrico Ferri	Italian Democratic Socialist Party	SOC
Gianfranco Fini (Until 11 May 1992) Pietro Mitolo (from 5 May 1992)	Italian Social Movement	NI
Arnaldo Forlani	Christian Democracy	EPP
Roberto Formigoni (until 6 May 1993) Maria Teresa Coppo Gavazzi (from 18 May 1993)	Christian Democracy	EPP
Mario Forte	Christian Democracy	EPP
Gerardo Gaibisso	Christian Democracy	EPP
Giulio Cesare Gallenzi	Christian Democracy	EPP
Jas Gawronski	Italian Republican Party	LDR
Giovanni Goria (until 13 April 1991) Agostino Mantovani (from 23 April 1991)	Christian Democracy	EPP
Francesco Guidolin	Christian Democracy	EPP
Franco Iacono	Italian Socialist Party	SOC
Renzo Imbeni	Italian Communist Party (Until 11 January 1993) Democratic Party of the Left	UEL (Until 11 January 1993) SOC
Antonio Iodice	Christian Democracy	EPP
Lelio Lagorio	Italian Socialist Party	SOC
Giorgio La Malfa (until 13 March 1992) Elda Pucci (from 24 March 1992)	Italian Republican Party	LDR
Alexander Langer	Federation of Green Lists	G
Antonio La Pergola	Italian Socialist Party	SOC
Nereo Laroni	Italian Socialist Party	SOC
Salvatore Lima (until 12 March 1992) Aldo De Matteo (from 17 March 1992)	Christian Democracy	EPP
Calogero Lo Giudice	Christian Democracy	EPP
Maria Magnani Noya	Italian Socialist Party	SOC
Vincenzo Mattina	Italian Socialist Party	SOC
Eugenio Melandri	Proletarian Democracy	G
Mario Melis	Sardinian Action Party–Valdostan Union	RWG
Alberto Michelini	Christian Democracy	EPP
Luigi Moretti	Lombard League	RWG (until 4 April 1994) NI
Giuseppe Mottola	Christian Democracy	EPP
Cristiana Muscardini	Italian Social Movement	NI
Pasqualina Napoletano	Italian Communist Party (Until 11 January 1993) Democratic Party of the Left	UEL (Until 11 January 1993) SOC
Giorgio Napolitano (until 10 June 1992) Gaetano Cingari (from 15 June 1992 until 9 May 1994) Andrea Carmine De Simone (from 9 May 1994)	Italian Communist Party (Until 11 January 1993) Democratic Party of the Left	UEL (Until 11 January 1993) SOC
Achille Occhetto	Italian Communist Party (Until 11 January 1993) Democratic Party of the Left	UEL (until 11 January 1993) SOC
Marco Pannella	Federalisti	NI
Ferruccio Pisoni	Christian Democracy	EPP
Nino Pisoni	Christian Democracy	EPP
Giacomo Porrazzini	Italian Communist Party (Until 11 January 1993) Democratic Party of the Left	UEL (Until 11 January 1993) SOC
Andrea Raggio	Italian Communist Party (Until 11 January 1993) Democratic Party of the Left	UEL (Until 11 January 1993) SOC
Giuseppe Rauti	Italian Social Movement	NI
Tullio Eugenio Regge	Italian Communist Party (Until 11 January 1993) Democratic Party of the Left	UEL (Until 11 January 1993) SOC
Edoardo Ronchi (until 26 July 1989) Francesco Corleone (from 27 July to 25 October 1989) Virginio Bettini (from 26 October 1989)	Rainbow Greens	G
Giorgio Rossetti	Italian Communist Party (Until 11 January 1993) Democratic Party of the Left	UEL (Until 11 January 1993) SOC
Mario Giovanni Guerriero Ruffini (until 15 September 1990) Eolo Parodi (from 27 September 1990)	Christian Democracy	EPP
Gabriele Sboarina	Christian Democracy	EPP
Roberto Speciale	Italian Communist Party (Until 11 January 1993) Democratic Party of the Left	UEL (Until 11 January 1993) SOC
Francesco Enrico Speroni (until May 11, 1994) Gipo Farassino (from 19 May 1994)	Lombard League	RWG (until 4 April 1994) NI
Marco Taradash	Antiproibizionisti sulla droga	G (until 15 April 1993) NI (until 2 May 1994) LDR
Giuseppe Tatarella (until 18 October 1989) Antonio Mazzone (from 26 October 1989)	Italian Social Movement	NI
Renzo Trivelli	Italian Communist Party (Until 11 January 1993) Democratic Party of the Left	UEL (Until 11 January 1993) SOC
Dacia Valent	Italian Communist Party (Until 11 January 1993) Communist Refoundation Party	UEL (Until 11 January 1993) NI
Luciano Vecchi	Italian Communist Party (Until 11 January 1993) Democratic Party of the Left	UEL (Until 11 January 1993) SOC
Luigi Vertemati	Italian Socialist Party	SOC
Bruno Visentini	Italian Republican Party	LDR
