= List of members of the European Parliament for Luxembourg, 1989–1994 =

This is a list of the 6 members of the European Parliament for Luxembourg in the 1989 to 1994 session.

== List ==
Name	National party	EP Group
Nicolas Estgen	Christian Social People's Party	EPP
Ben Fayot	Socialist Workers' Party	SOC
Colette Flesch (Note: Resigned on 5 June 1990. Replaced by Lydie Polfer on 12 June 1990.)	Democratic Party	LDR
Robert Krieps (Note: Died on 1 August 1990. Replaced by Marcel Schlechter on 9 October 1990.)	Socialist Workers' Party	SOC
Astrid Lulling	Christian Social People's Party	EPP
Viviane Reding	Christian Social People's Party	EPP

=== Party representation ===
National party	EP Group	Seats	±
Christian Social People's Party	EPP	3 / 6	Steady
Socialist Workers' Party	PES	2 / 6	Steady
Democratic Party	LD	1 / 6	Steady
