= European United Left (1994–1995) =

Former left-wing political group of the European Parliament (1994–1995)

- European Parliament group
- Name: European United Left
- English abbr.: EUL
- French abbr.: GUE
- Formal name: Confederal Group of the European United Left
- Ideology: Socialism; Communism
- From: 19 July 1994
- To: 6 January 1995
- Preceded by: European United Left (1989–1993); Left Unity
- Succeeded by: European United Left–Nordic Green Left
- Chaired by: Alonso José Puerta
- MEP(s): 28 (19 July 1994)

The Confederal Group of the European United Left was a socialist and communist political group with seats in the European Parliament between 1994 and 1995.

== History ==
The Confederal Group of the European United Left was formed on 19 July 1994. It consisted of MEPs from the United Left of Spain (including the Spanish Communist Party), the Greek Synaspismós, the French Communist Party, the Portuguese Communist Party, the Communist Party of Greece, and the Communist Refoundation Party of Italy.

In 1995, the enlargement of the European Union led to the creation of the Nordic Green Left. It consisted of MEPs from the Finnish Left Alliance, the Swedish Left Party and the Danish Socialist People's Party. The Nordic Green Left Alliance merged with the Confederal Group of the European United Left on 6 January 1995, and the resultant Group was called the Confederal Group of the European United Left/Nordic Green Left.

== Sources ==
- Development of Political Groups in the European Parliament
- Europe Politique
- Democracy in the European Parliament
- European Parliament MEP Archives
- Political Groups of the European Parliament
- Group names 1999
- Political Groups Annual Accounts 2001-2006
