= Carlos Pimenta =

Portuguese electrical engineer and politician

Personal details
- Born: May 7, 1955 (age 71) Lisbon, Portugal
- Party: Social Democratic Party
- Education: University of Lisbon
- Occupation: Politician, electrical engineer

Carlos Alberto Martins Pimenta (May 7, 1955, Lisbon, Portugal), commonly known as Carlos Pimenta, is a Portuguese electrical engineer and politician.

== Biography ==
He became prominent in the 1980s in the field of environmentalism, participating in the activities of Geota.

He was elected by the Social Democratic Party (PSD), in the Setúbal constituency, as a member of Parliament in the 1985–1897 and 1987–1991 legislatures, having served as Secretary of State for the Environment in 1983–1984 and as Secretary of State for Fisheries in 1985 (IX and X Governments).

He was a member of the European Parliament, elected by the PPD, during the legislative periods of 1987–1989, 1989–1994, and 1994–1999. He notably worked on the Committee on the Environment, Public Health, and Consumer Protection.

In October 1987 the Attorney General's Office initiated an inquiry, at the request of the XI Constitutional Government led by Aníbal Cavaco Silva, into the allocation of a set of studies funded by European funds to the Center for the Study of Energy and Transport Economics and Environment (CEEETA), a decision made by Carlos Pimenta while he was the Secretary of State for the Environment. Carlos Pimenta consistently denied all accusations, claiming to be the target of a defamation campaign. The High Authority Against Corruption also conducted an inquiry into Carlos Pimenta's decision, concluding that all legal requirements were met and that the financial accounts were transparent, although ethical questions were raised regarding the government members' involvement in CEEETA. The Attorney General's Office also found no evidence of criminal, disciplinary, or administrative irregularities.

He was awarded the Order of Prince Henry Third Class (1989).
