= European United Left (1989–1993) =

Former left-wing political group of the European Parliament (1989–1993)

- European Parliament group
- Name: European United Left
- English abbr.: EUL
- French abbr.: GUE
- Formal name: Group for the European United Left
- Ideology: Democratic socialism Eurocommunism
- Political position: Left-wing
- From: 25 July 1989
- To: 11 January 1993
- Preceded by: Communist and Allies Group
- Succeeded by: European United Left (1994–1995)
- Chaired by: Luigi Alberto Colajanni
- MEP(s): 28 (25 July 1989)

The Group for the European United Left was a left-wing political group with seats in the European Parliament between 1989 and 1993.

== History ==
The Group for the European United Left (EUL) was formed on 25 July 1989. It was separate from Left Unity, which contained orthodox communist parties.

It consisted of MEPs from the Danish Socialist People's Party (SF), the Italian Communist Party (PCI), the United Left (IU) of Spain (including the Communist Party of Spain (PCE)) and one MEP from the Greek Synaspismós (SYN). It was later joined by the Democratic Left (DL) of Ireland's sole MEP.

In February 1991, the Italian Communist Party dissolved itself to establish the post-communist Democratic Party of the Left. Twenty of their MPs joined the new party, while two (Luciana Castellina and Dacia Valent) joined the Communist Refoundation Party. Both parties remained within the group.

In July 1992, John Iversen, the Socialist People's Party's only MEP, left EUL to join the Green Group.

EUL collapsed in January 1993 when with its MEPs leaving the EUL group to join the Party of European Socialists. After the group's collapse, the remaining members sat out their term as non-inscrits. During the next term in 1994, a new EUL group was formed uniting the old UEL (except SF, who stayed in the Green Group, and DL, who lost their seat) and the LU, before its merger into European United Left-Nordic Green Left.

== Members ==
Country	National party	MEPs	Joining date	Leaving date	Left to	1994 group
Denmark	Socialist People's Party	1 / 16	25 July 1989	1 July 1992	G	G
Greece	Synaspismos	1 / 24	25 July 1989	11 January 1993	NI	EUL
Ireland	Democratic Left	1 / 13	19 December 1991	11 January 1993	NI	lost seat
Italy	Italian Communist Party (until 3 February 1991); Democratic Party of the Left (after 3 February 1991)	22 / 81 20 / 81	25 July 1989	11 January 1993	SOC	SOC
Italy	Communist Refoundation Party (after 3 February 1991)	2 / 81	3 February 1991	11 January 1993	NI	EUL
Spain	United Left	4 / 60	25 July 1989	11 January 1993	NI	EUL

== Sources ==
- Development of Political Groups in the European Parliament
- Europe Politique
- Democracy in the European Parliament
- European Parliament MEP Archives
- Political Groups of the European Parliament
- "European Union: Power and Policy-Making" second edition, ISBN 0-415-22164-1
