= Teresa Domingo Segarra =

Spanish politician and economist (born 1953)

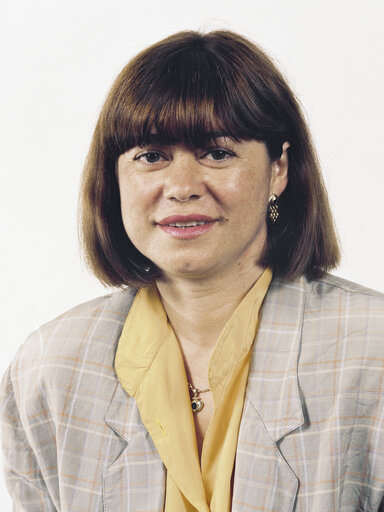
Teresa Domingo Segarra

Teresa Domingo Segarra (born 24 April 1953 in Castellón de la Plana) is a Spanish politician, economist, and professor, who was elected to the European Parliament in the 1989 European Parliament election in Spain for the United Left party. She served as the vice-chair for the Committee on Women's Rights from 1989 to 1994. She has also worked as a professor of applied economics and economic structure at the University of Valencia.
