= Anna Catasta =

Italian politician

Member of the European Parliament
- In office 1989–1994

Personal details
- Born: 6 May 1952 (age 74) Genoa, Italy
- Party: PDS (since 1991)
- Other political affiliations: PCI (until 1991)
- Education: University of Milan

Anna Catasta (born 6 May 1952) is an Italian politician. She served as a member of the European Parliament from 1989 to 1994.

== Biography ==
She graduated in modern literature at the University of Milan. From 1981 to 1989 she was part of the provincial confederal secretariat of the CGIL of Milan.

She was elected to the European Parliament in the 1989 European Parliament election with the Italian Communist Party. She was a member of the Committee on Social Affairs, Employment and Working Conditions, the Delegation for Relations with ASEAN Member Countries and the Republic of Korea (AIPO), the Commission on Women's Rights, the Delegation for Relations with South Asia, and the South Asian Association for Regional Cooperation (SAARC). After the Svolta della Bolognina, she joined the PDS. She completed her term in Strasbourg in 1994.

He subsequently worked as a senior consultant on strategies for the integration of community policies and in technical assistance for projects.

== See also ==
- List of members of the European Parliament (1989–1994)
- List of members of the European Parliament for Italy, 1989–1994
