= Júlio Miranda Calha =

Portuguese politician (1947–2020)

Júlio Francisco Miranda Calha (17 November 1947 – 28 March 2020) was a Portuguese Socialist Party politician. He served in the Assembly of the Republic from the Constituent Assembly in 1975 until the end of the 13th legislature in 2019.

== Biography ==
Born in Portalegre, Miranda Calha earned degrees in German Studies and Pedagogical Sciences. He was a founder member of the Socialist Party's branch in Portalegre District after the Carnation Revolution in 1974.

Miranda Calha was elected to the Constituent Assembly of Portugal in 1975 and retained his seat until the end of the 13th legislature in 2019. He was elected by his home district until 2011 when he was voted in by the Porto District, and finally the Lisbon District four years later. In October 2014, he was elected to replace Ferro Rodrigues as Vice President of the Assembly.

A close ally of Mário Soares, he said this in 2018 when asked whether he was left-wing: "I'm not saying yes or no. I am centre-left, which is normal. The PS is a party of the people, not a populist party. It is made up of diverse sectors of society. This was how it consolidated itself and this is its culture".

Miranda Calha was Secretary of State for Defence in the government of António Guterres from 2000 to 2001. He joined the NATO Parliamentary Assembly in 1991 and was voted its vice president in 2011 and 2012.

He was awarded the Grand Cross of the Order of Prince Henry in April 2005 and the Grand Cross of the Order of Merit in February 2006. He also received the Municipal Medal of Merit, Gold Grade, from his hometown. He died of a stroke at the age of 72.
