= Mathilde van den Brink =

Dutch politician (1941–2023)

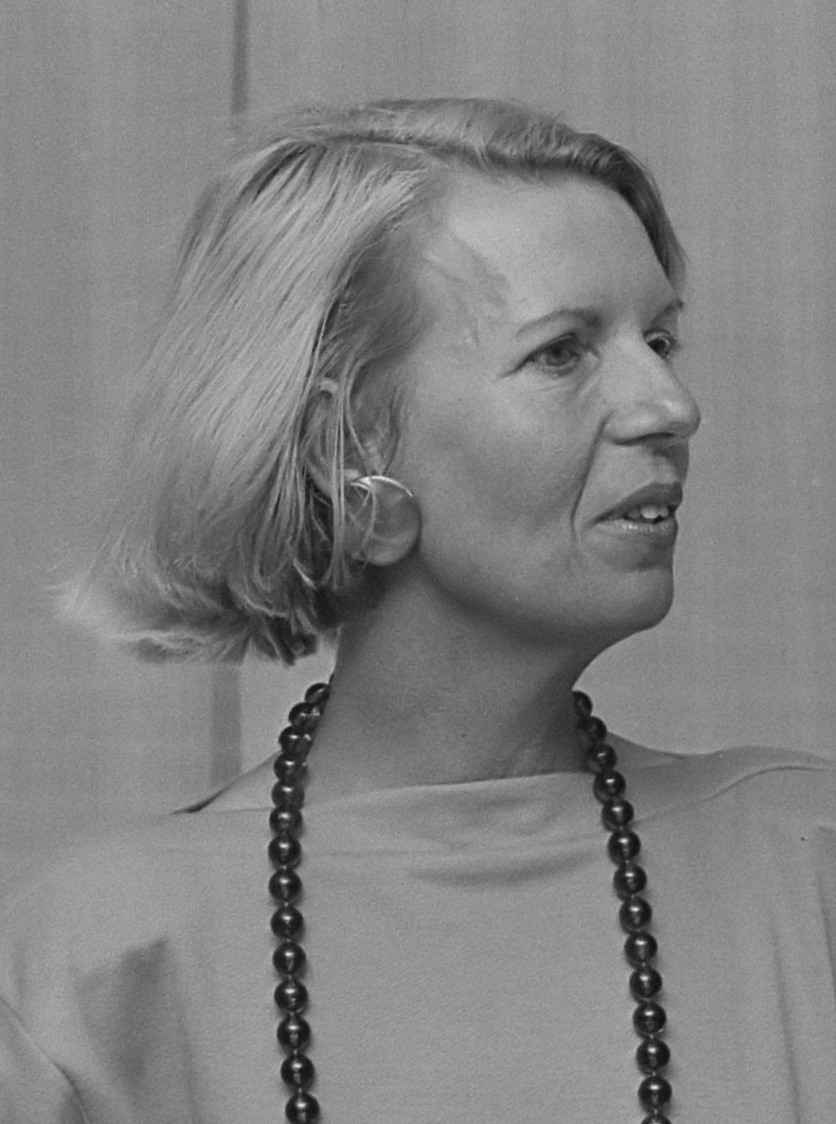
- Van den Brink in 1986

Member of the European Parliament for the Netherlands
- In office 16 November 1989 – 18 July 1994

Personal details
- Born: Mathilde Maria van den Brink; 4 February 1941 Utrecht, German-occupied Netherlands
- Died: 22 August 2023 (aged 82) Utrecht, Netherlands
- Party: PvdA
- Occupation: Schoolteacher

Mathilde Maria van den Brink (4 February 1941 – 22 August 2023) was a Dutch schoolteacher and politician. A member of the Labour Party, she served in the European Parliament from 1989 to 1994.

Van den Brink died in Utrecht on 22 August 2023, at the age of 82.
