= François Guillaume =

French politician (born 1932)

François Guillaume (born 19 October 1932 in Ville-en-Vermois) is a French politician. He was a member of the Rally for the Republic and after then a member of the Union for a Popular Movement. Between 1979 and 1986, he was the president of the Fédération Nationale des Syndicats d'Exploitants d'Agricoles.

He was Minister of Agriculture between 1986 and 1988. Between 1989 and 1994, he was a Member of the European Parliament. Between 1993 and 2002, He has been a member of Parliament.
