= Marie Anne Isler Béguin =

French politician and Member of the European Parliament (born 1956)

Marie-Anne Isler-Béguin
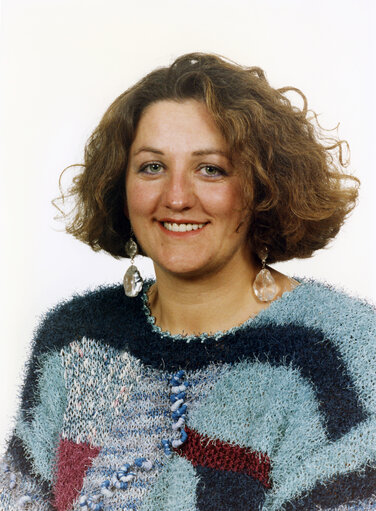
- photo from 2012

Member of the European Parliament

Personal details
- Born: 30 June 1956 (age 70) Boulay-Moselle
- Other political affiliations: European Green Party
- Occupation: Politician

Marie-Anne Isler-Béguin (born 30 June 1956 in Boulay-Moselle) is a French politician and Member of the European Parliament for the East of France. She is a member of the French Greens, part of the European Greens. She was re-elected in 2004. She sits on the Committee on the Environment, Public Health and Food Safety and is a substitute for the Committee on Foreign Affairs. She also is the Chairwoman of the delegation of the European parliament to Armenia, Azerbaijan, and Georgia.

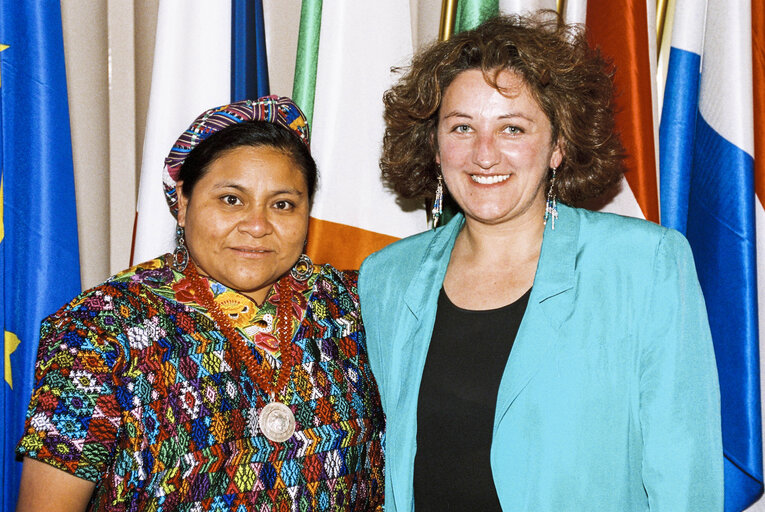
Marie-Anne Isler-Béguin with Noble Laureate Rigoberta Menchú.
