= Janine Cayet =

French politician (born 1943)

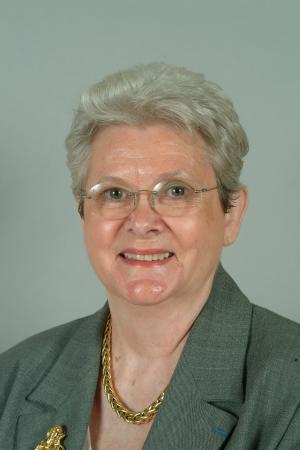
- Cayet in 2012
- Born: Janine Finidori; 24 May 1943 (age 83); Nîmes, France
- Occupations: Nurse, politician
- Known for: Maisons de Lyliane

Janine Thérèse Annette Cayet, born Janine Finidori (Nîmes, 24 May 1943), was a French politician and between 1993 and 1994, was a member of the European Parliament (MEP). She was a vocal advocate for disabled people.

== Biography ==
A nurse by profession, she was active in several healthcare unions. From 1996 to 2015, she chaired SYNEAS, the medical and social workers' union. She was particularly active in associations, working for 30 years on the social and work inclusion of people with disabilities. From 1991 to 2015, she directed APHAPHA (Association pour l'accueil des personnes handicapées et des personnes âgées). From 2001 to 2015, she was active in OETH (Obligation d'Emploi des Travailleurs Handicapées).

When a disabled acquaintance, 52 years old, found himself homeless after the death of his caregiving mother, he was committed at a hospice facility where he died in appalling conditions. Cayet became outraged, saying later, "I couldn't understand why there were no facilities for elderly people with Down syndrome or psychosis." The incident inspired her to buy land in the Yvelines department in the western part of the Île-de-France region. There, in 1996, she "created the first residential facility for aging people with intellectual disabilities" called the Maisons de Lyliane. A second home was opened in 2003 to provide palliative care. Today, the Maisons de Lyliane include "five establishments on two sites. Together, they employ 200 staff who welcome 300 users each year."

She entered politics with the Republican Party and from 1983 to 2008, she was a member of the municipal council of Trappes. From 1988 to 1993, she was a member of the council of the Union for French Democracy (UDF). In 1997, after the transformation of the Republican Party, she joined Liberal Democracy, for which she held political office from 1997 to 1998. She was later active in the Democratic Movement. From 2004 to 2010, she was a member of the regional council of Île-de-France, which includes Paris.

In 1989, Cayet ran for the European Parliament on the UDF ballot, and in 1993 she ran for a seat in the National Assembly, but remained unelected in both races. On 18 June 1993, she obtained the seat as a member of the European Parliament, replacing the resigning Alain Marleix. She became a member of the group of the European Liberals, Democrats and Reformists, as well as a member of the Committee on Development and Cooperation and the Joint Assembly of the Convention between the African, Caribbean and Pacific States and the European Economic Community.

Janine Cayet was often a member of national advisory bodies, including the Conseil économique, social et environnemental (1995–2000, 2010–2015). In 2015, she retired from politics.

== Selected honors ==
- Knight of the Ordre national du Mérite, for being president of an association for disabled people; 38 years of civil service, professional and social activities — Paris, 14 November 2001
- Knight of the Order of the Legion of Honor, for being a former Member of the European Parliament, former regional councillor of Ile-de-France; 48 years of service — Paris, 30 December 2011
