= Bernard Frimat =

French politician (born 1940)

Bernard Frimat (French: [bɛʁnaʁ fʁima]; born 12 October 1940 in Paimbœuf) is a former member of the Senate of France, who represented the Nord department from 2002 to 2011. He is a member of the Socialist Party.

== Bibliography ==
- Page on the Senate website (in French)
