= António Coimbra Martins =

Portuguese politician (1927–2021)

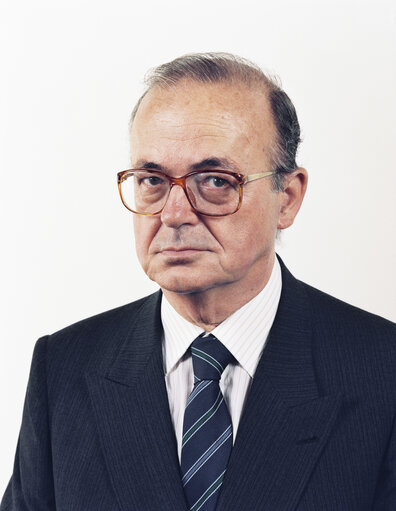
- Official portrait as an MEP, 1989

Minister of Culture
- In office 9 June 1983 – 6 November 1985
- Preceded by: Francisco Lucas Pires
- Succeeded by: João de Deus Pinheiro

Member of the European Parliament
- In office 1 January 1986 – 18 July 1994
- Constituency: Portugal

Member of the Assembly of the Republic
- In office 4 November 1985 – 1 January 1986
- Constituency: Vila Real
- In office 31 May 1983 – 3 November 1985
- Constituency: Europe

Personal details
- Born: António Antero Coimbra Martins; 30 January 1927 Lisbon, Portugal
- Died: 19 May 2021 (aged 94) Paris, France
- Party: Socialist
- Occupation: Politician
- Profession: professor, writer

António Antero Coimbra Martins (30 January 1927 – 19 May 2021) was a Portuguese politician and writer who was one of the founding members of the Socialist Party. He also served as Minister of Culture from 1983 until 1985.

== Biography ==
Coimbra Martins was born in Lisbon in 1927. He studied Romance studies in the University of Lisbon, before becoming a high school teacher and later a university professor.

In 1964 he joined the Portuguese Socialist Action and, in 1973, he was one of the founding members of the Socialist Party, becoming a member of the party's leadership. Following the Carnation Revolution, he became the Ambassador to France, staying in office until 1979.

In 1983 he was first elected as a member of the Assembly of the Republic, joining Mário Soares' Central Bloc government shortly after as Minister of Culture.

After leaving office, he was appointed to the first Portuguese delegation to the European Parliament, being elected in 1987 and reelected in 1989.

Coimbra Martins died at 94 years old in May 2021, in Paris.
