= Jean-François Hory =

French politician

- Born: 15 May 1949; Neufchâteau, Vosges, France
- Died: 28 December 2017 (aged 68); Burgundy, France
- Occupation(s): Politician, lawyer

Jean-François Hory (French pronunciation: [ʒɑ̃ fʁɑ̃swa ɔʁi]; 15 May 1949 – 28 December 2017) was a French politician.

== Biography ==
From 1981 to 1986, he was a member of the National Assembly. In 1989, he became a member of the European Parliament (MEP). While serving as an MEP, he was elected president of the Radical Party of the Left in 1992, a position that he held until 1996. In February 1995, he declared his candidacy for the French presidential election but later withdrew.

Hory was born on 15 May 1949 in Neufchâteau, Vosges. Appointed to the Conseil d'État in 2008, he returned to Mayotte for a few months as a lawyer. He died of cancer at the age of 68 on 28 December 2017 in Burgundy.
