= Bernhard Sälzer =

German politician (1940–1993)

Bernhard Sälzer (4 September 1940 – 18 December 1993) was a German politician (CDU), member of the Landtag of Hesse and of the European Parliament.

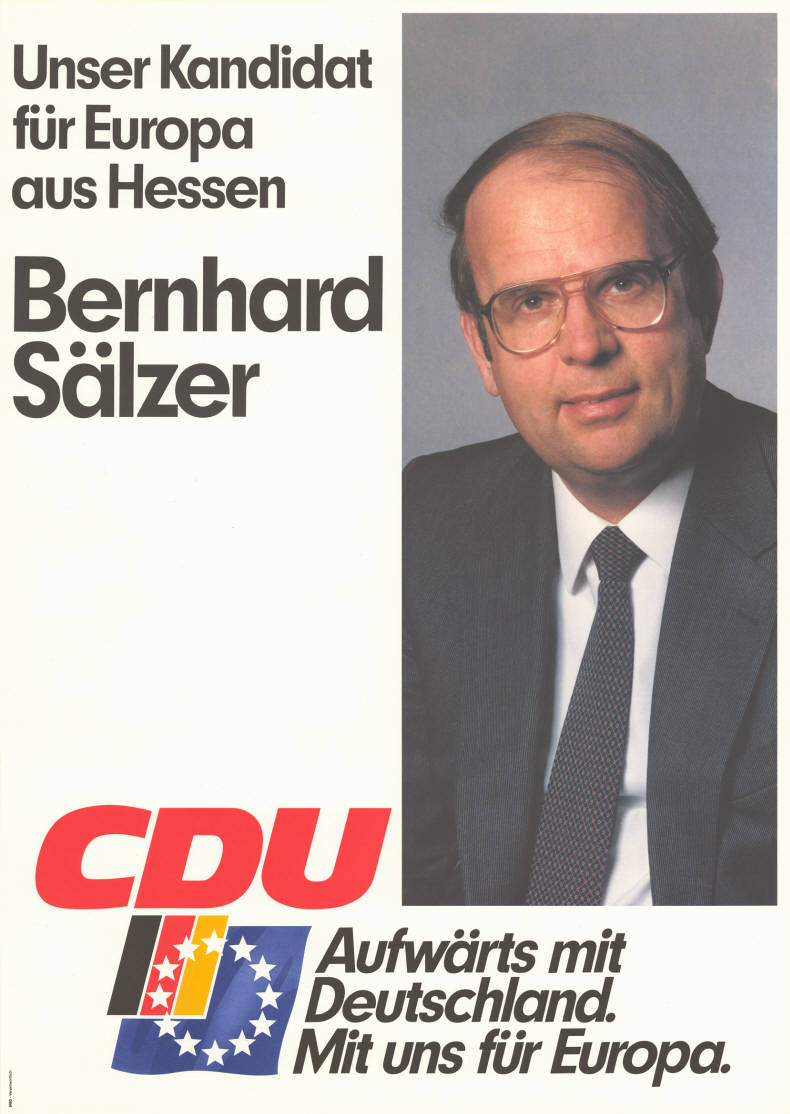
Image of Bernhard Sälzer at the front cover of a magazine

== Sources ==
- Jochen Lengemann, President of the Landtag of Hesse (ed.): Das Hessen-Parlament 1946–1986. Biographisches Handbuch des Beratenden Landesausschusses, der Verfassungsberatenden Landesversammlung und des Hessischen Landtags (1.–11. Wahlperiode). Insel-Verlag, Frankfurt am Main 1986
