= Marie-José Denys =

French politician (1950–2022)

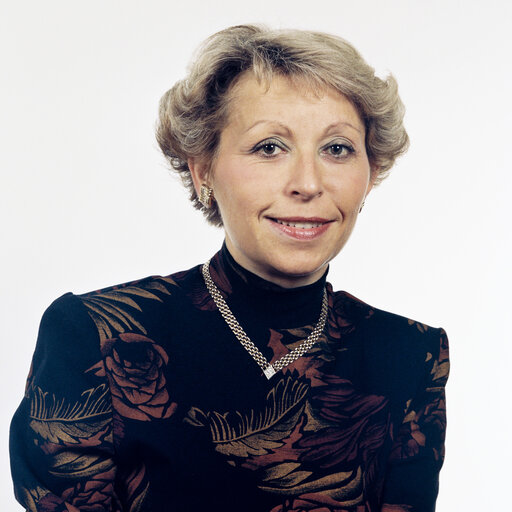

Member of the European Parliament
- In office 17 July 1997 – 19 July 1999
- In office 25 July 1989 – 18 July 1994

Personal details
- Born: 15 March 1950 La Rochelle, France
- Died: 12 January 2022 (aged 71)
- Party: PS

Marie-José Denys (15 March 1950 – 12 January 2022) was a French politician. A member of the Socialist Party, she served in the European Parliament from 1989 to 1994 and again from 1997 to 1999. She died on 12 January 2022, at the age of 71.
