= Jean-Paul Heider =

French business executive and politician

Vice president of the Regional Council of Alsace
- In office 1986–2010

Member of the European Parliament
- In office 10 June 1993 – 18 July 1994

Personal details
- Born: Jean-Paul Gilbert Heider; 13 February 1939 (age 87) Strasbourg, France
- Party: Rally for the Republic
- Occupation: Business executive, politician
- Website: Parliament website

Jean-Paul Gilbert Heider (French pronunciation: [ʒɑ̃ pɔl aidɛʁ]; born 13 February 1939) is a French business executive and politician who has served as a vice councilor on the Regional Council of Alsace between 1986 and 2010 and as Member of the European Parliament for the Rally for the Republic from 1993 to 1994. He currently is a coopted member of the EuroAirport Basel Mulhouse Freiburg.

== Literature ==
- André Rohmer: Jean-Paul Gilbert Heider, In; Alsatian Biographical Dictionary (Vol. 16, Page 1476) (in French)
