= Aline Archimbaud =

French politician

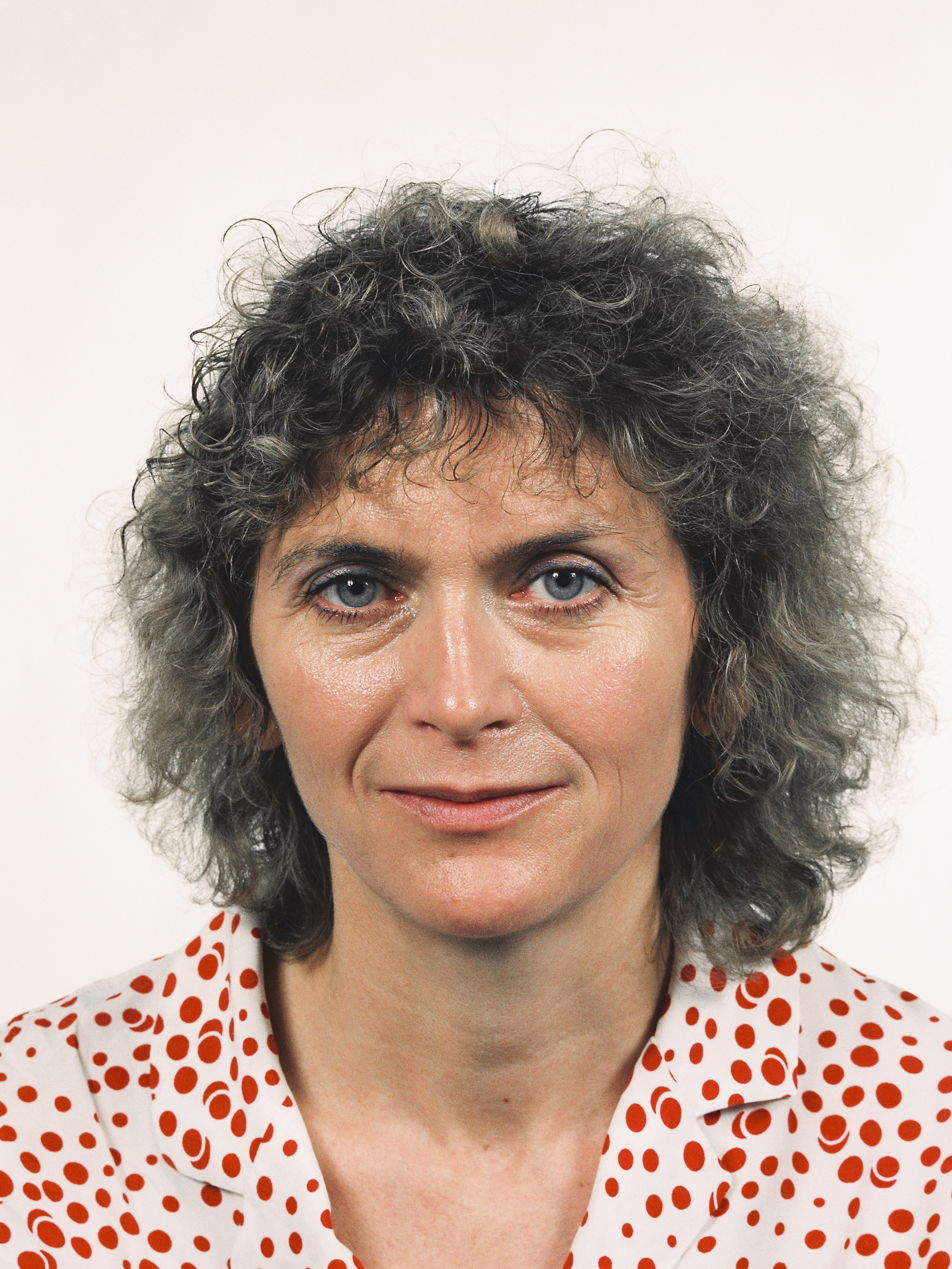
Aline Archimbaud around 1992

Aline Archimbaud (born 2 November 1948) is a French politician. She is a member of the French Senate who represents the department of Seine-Saint-Denis. She is a member of the Écologistes !.

She was born in Belfort. Archimbaud was elected to the European Parliament in 1992 and served until 1994 as a member of The Green Group in the European Parliament. She was elected to the French senate on 2 September 2011.
