= Annemarie Goedmakers =

Dutch politician and ecologist (born 1948)

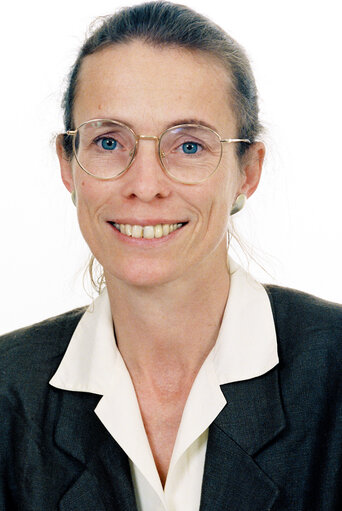

Member of the European Parliament
- In office 16 November 1989 – 18 July 1994

Member of the provincial council of North Holland
- In office 1978–1983

Personal details
- Born: Anne Maria Catharina Goedmakers; 25 March 1948 (age 78) Amsterdam, Netherlands
- Party: PvdA
- Education: University of Amsterdam Claude Bernard University Lyon 1
- Occupation: Politician; ecologist

Anne Maria Catharina (Annemarie) Goedmakers (born 25 March 1948) is a Dutch ecologist and politician of the Dutch Labour Party (PvdA).

== Early life and education ==
Goedmakers attended grammar school at the Fons Vitae Lyceum and studied biology at the University of Amsterdam and also for a year at the Claude Bernard University Lyon 1. She obtained her PhD from the University of Amsterdam in 1981 for aquatic ecology research.

== Political career ==
From 1978 to 1983, she was a member of the provincial council of North Holland. There, Goedmakers clashed with her fellow party member, Queen's Commissioner Roel de Wit, when she took her baby on her lap during a meeting. After this she worked for the Ministry of Welfare, Health and Culture and for the consultancy firm DHV.

Within the PvdA, Goedmakers was a member of the national working group Rooie Vrouwen ('Red Women'), was a member of the party board and served as second vice-chairman there between 1987 and 1991. She entered the European Parliament in November 1989. There she focused mainly on budgetary matters, energy and technology. She did not return in 1994. She held various board positions and was a member of various advisory boards, especially in the areas of nature, environment, sustainability and development affairs. Goedmakers was, among other things, director of sustainability at Nuon, regional director at Staatsbosbeheer, chairman of Milieudefensie and chairman of Stichting AAP. In 2005 she lost an internal election for the party chairmanship of the PvdA of Michiel van Hulten.
