= René-Émile Piquet =

French politician

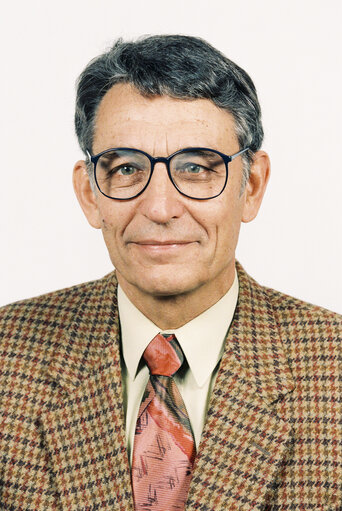
Image of René Piquet

René-Émile Piquet is a French politician (born 23 October 1932 in Romorantin-Lanthenay) and long-time leader of the PCF, sitting on its Political Bureau from 1964 to 1990.

He was a Member of the European Parliament from 1979 to 1997.

== Sources ==
- European Parliament MEP Archives
