= Margarida Salema =

Portuguese researcher, politician, professor

Margarida Salema MEP
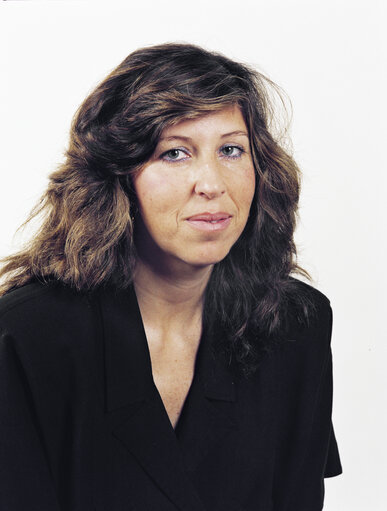

Member of the European Parliament for Portugal
- In office 25 July 1989 – 18 July 1994

Personal details
- Born: 19 January 1954 Lisbon, Portugal
- Party: Social Democratic Party

Margarida Salema d’Oliveira Martins, better known as Margarida Salema (born in Lisbon, 1954) is a former politician, university professor, and Portuguese researcher. She was one of the Members of the European Parliament promoting the initiative of gender-balanced parliament in Portugal during the 1990s. She served as the president of the Entity of Political Accounts and Financing of the Portuguese Constitutional Court from 2009 to 2017.

== Biography ==
Salema graduated in law in 1976, completed her master's degree in law in the field of legal and political sciences in 1984, and obtained her doctorate in law in legal and political sciences in 2002 at the Faculty of Law of the University of Lisbon.

She served as an expert on the Committee on the Elimination of Discrimination against Women (CEDAW) of the United Nations (UN) from 1980 to 1988.

Between 1980 and 1985, she was a member of the Portuguese Assembly and between 1989 and 1994, she was a member of the European Parliament.

In 1990, she became the director of the semi-annual Portuguese-Spanish public law journal Estado & Direito.

In 1996, she became an associate professor at the Faculty of Law of the Lusíada University of Lisbon.

In 2006, she became a member of the scientific council of the Journal of European studies, of the Interuniversity Association of European Studies, in collaboration with the European Institute of the Faculty of Law of Lisbon. In 2007, she assumed the position of researcher at the Center for Legal, Economic, and Environmental Studies of the Lusíada University of Lisbon, within the Research Group in Public law and Political Theory.

In 2009, she resigned from the Social Democratic Party to take office as president of the Entity for Political Accounts and Financing of the Constitutional Court, a position she held until 2017.

In 2017, Margarida Salema resumed her position as associate professor at the Faculty of Law of the University of Lisbon, with areas of interest and research including European Union law, International Public Law, International Organizations, and Constitutional law.

In 2020, she criticized the changes to the financing of electoral campaigns proposed by the Social Democratic Party (PSD), as they were in conflict with Law 19/2003.

== Publications ==
- Martins, Margarida Salema d'Oliveira (2018). A União Europeia: o direito e a atividade (in Portuguese). Quid Juris. ISBN 978-972-724-789-9.
- Martins, Margarida Salema d'Oliveira (2003). O princípio da subsidiariedade em perspectiva jurídico-política (in Portuguese). Coimbra Editora. ISBN 978-972-32-1163-4.
- Margarida Salema d' Oliveira Martins. O Direito de Veto na Constituição de 1976. Braga: Livraria Cruz, 1980

== Awards ==
- Adelaide Ristori Award
