= Martine Buron =

French architect and politician

Deputy Martine Buron
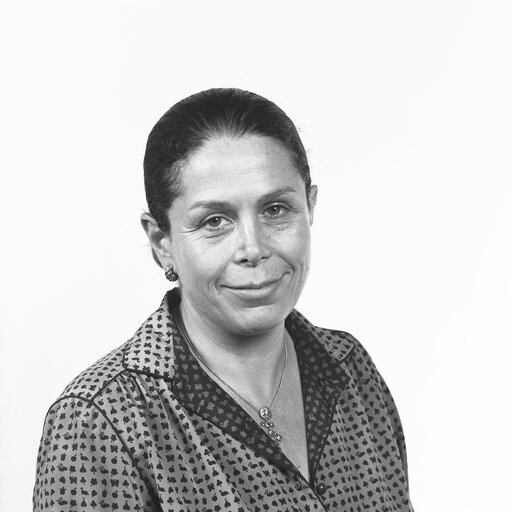

Member of the European Parliament
- In office 1988–1994

Mayor of Châteaubriant
- In office 1989–2001
- Preceded by: Xavier Hunault
- Succeeded by: Alain Hunault

President of Fédération française des maisons de l'Europe
- Incumbent
- Assumed office 2017
- Preceded by: Catherine Lalumière

Personal details
- Born: 12 January 1944 (age 82) Neuilly-sur-Seine, France
- Profession: Politician

Martine Buron (born 12 January 1944) is a French architect and politician. She is the daughter of Robert Buron.

Since 1973, she initially worked as an architect in Paris and then in Nantes.

In 1981 she became the vice secretary of the Socialist Party, responsible for the women's sector. She became the socialist mayor of Châteaubriant in 1989 and was re-elected in 1995. She fostered inter-municipal cooperation between the small ones. From 2001 to 2008 he joined the opposition.

She was elected Member of European Parliament (MEP) for the Socialist Party in 1989 until 1994.

== Bibliography ==
- Christian Le Bart, «Sur deux récits d'entrée en politique», on Pôle Sud, n° 7, 1997
