= Joaquim Miranda =

Portuguese politician (1950–2006)

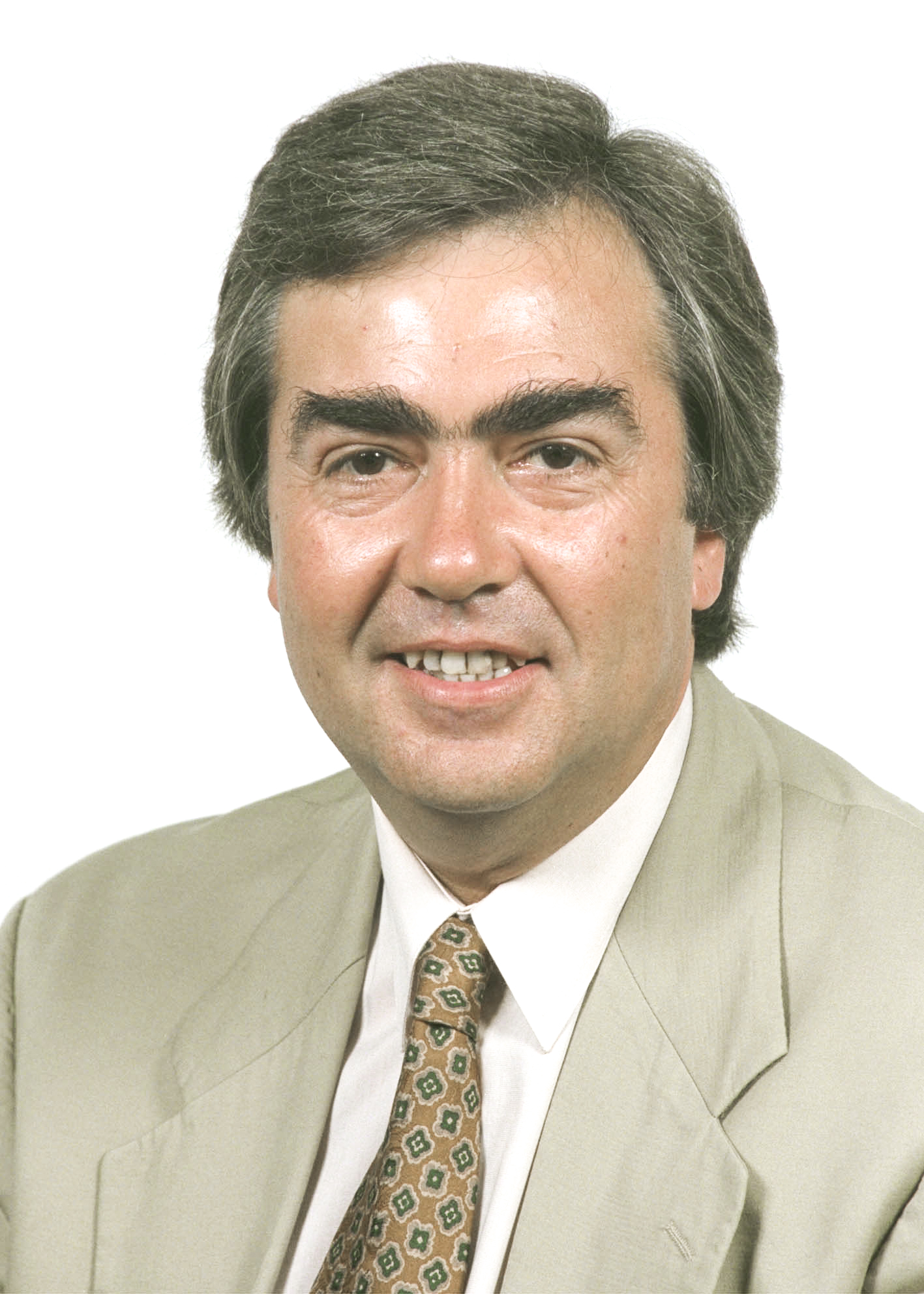
- Miranda in 1994

Member of the European Parliament for Portugal
- In office 19 July 1987 – 20 July 2004

Member of the Assembly of the Republic
- In office 1980–1986

Personal details
- Born: Joaquim António Miranda da Silva; 7 September 1950 Portalegre, Portugal
- Died: 17 June 2006 (aged 55)
- Party: Portuguese Communist Party
- Other political affiliations: Renovação Comunista

Joaquim António Miranda da Silva (7 September 1950 – 17 June 2006) was a Portuguese economist and politician who was a member of the Portuguese Parliament and of the European Parliament.

== Early life ==
He was born in Portalegre, in the southern region of Alentejo.

== Career ==
Joaquim Miranda was a member of the Portuguese Communist Party since the 1970s, and was elected to several political jobs. Between 1979 and 1985, he was an alderman in the Municipal Chamber of his hometown, Portalegre.

Between 1980 and 1986, he was also a member of the Portuguese Parliament.

Inside the Portuguese Communist Party, Miranda was a member of the Central Committee and of the Regional Committee of Portalegre. In his last years, he left the Central Committee and became a member of the reformist group Renovação Comunista, which criticizes the party's political orientation.

=== European Parliament ===
When Portugal joined the European Union, in 1986, the Communist Party included his name in the list of the Portuguese representatives in the European Parliament. In July of the next year, the first Portuguese European Parliament election was held and Miranda was among the three MEPs elected by the Unitary Democratic Coalition, where the Portuguese Communist Party was included. He continued to be elected in the subsequent elections, and was a member of the European Parliament until 2004, when he resigned due to health problems. There, Miranda was a vice-chairman of the European United Left–Nordic Green Left group, and the chairman of the Committee on Development and Cooperation between 1999 and 2004.
