= List of members of the European Parliament for Germany, 1994–1999 =

Members of the European Parliament for Germany
ECSC delegation	(1952)
EP delegation	(1958)
1st term	(1979)
2nd term	(1984)
3rd term: (West Germany: 1989); (East Germany: 1991)
4th term	(1994)
5th term	(1999)
6th term	(2004)
7th term	(2009)
8th term	(2014)
9th term	(2019)
10th term	(2024)

This is the list of the 99 members of the European Parliament for Germany in the 1994 to 1999 session.

== List ==
Name	National party	EP Group
Otto Bardong	Christian Democratic Union	EPP
Rolf Berend	Christian Democratic Union	EPP
Reimer Böge	Christian Democratic Union	EPP
Elmar Brok	Christian Democratic Union	EPP
Karl-Heinz Florenz	Christian Democratic Union	EPP
Honor Funk	Christian Democratic Union	EPP
Marlies Mosiek-Urbahn (until 22 April 1999) Michael Gahler (from 23 April 1999)	Christian Democratic Union	EPP
Anne-Karin Glase	Christian Democratic Union	EPP
Lutz Goepel	Christian Democratic Union	EPP
Alfred Gomolka	Christian Democratic Union	EPP
Renate Heinisch	Christian Democratic Union	EPP
Karsten Friedrich Hoppenstedt	Christian Democratic Union	EPP
Georg Jarzembowski	Christian Democratic Union	EPP
Hedwig Keppelhoff-Wiechert	Christian Democratic Union	EPP
Christa Klaß	Christian Democratic Union	EPP
Dieter-Lebrecht Koch	Christian Democratic Union	EPP
Christoph Werner Konrad	Christian Democratic Union	EPP
Peter Kittelmann	Christian Democratic Union	EPP
Werner Langen	Christian Democratic Union	EPP
Brigitte Langenhagen	Christian Democratic Union	EPP
Klaus-Heiner Lehne	Christian Democratic Union	EPP
Marlene Lenz	Christian Democratic Union	EPP
Peter Liese	Christian Democratic Union	EPP
Kurt Malangré	Christian Democratic Union	EPP
Thomas Mann	Christian Democratic Union	EPP
Winfried Menrad	Christian Democratic Union	EPP
Peter Mombaur	Christian Democratic Union	EPP
Hartmut Nassauer	Christian Democratic Union	EPP
Doris Pack	Christian Democratic Union	EPP
Hans-Gert Pöttering	Christian Democratic Union	EPP
Godelieve Quisthoudt-Rowohl	Christian Democratic Union	EPP
Günter Rinsche	Christian Democratic Union	EPP
Horst Schnellhardt	Christian Democratic Union	EPP
Jürgen Schröder	Christian Democratic Union	EPP
Konrad Schwaiger	Christian Democratic Union	EPP
Stanislaw Tillich	Christian Democratic Union	EPP
Diemut Theato	Christian Democratic Union	EPP
Siegbert Alber (until October 6, 1997) Rainer Wieland (from 10 October 1997)	Christian Democratic Union	EPP
Karl von Wogau	Christian Democratic Union	EPP
Markus Ferber	Christian Social Union in Bavaria	EPP
Ingo Friedrich	Christian Social Union in Bavaria	EPP
Maren Günther	Christian Social Union in Bavaria	EPP
Otto von Habsburg	Christian Social Union in Bavaria	EPP
Xaver Mayer	Christian Social Union in Bavaria	EPP
Bernd Posselt	Christian Social Union in Bavaria	EPP
Edgar Schiedermeier	Christian Social Union in Bavaria	EPP
Ursula Schleicher	Christian Social Union in Bavaria	EPP
Undine von Blottnitz	Alliance '90/The Greens	G–EFA
Hiltrud Breyer	Alliance '90/The Greens	G–EFA
Claudia Roth (until 18 November 1998) Ozan Ceyhun (from 23 November 1998)	Alliance '90/The Greens	G–EFA
Daniel Cohn-Bendit	Alliance '90/The Greens	G–EFA
Friedrich-Wilhelm Graefe zu Baringdorf	Alliance '90/The Greens	G–EFA
Wolfgang Kreissl-Dörfler	Alliance '90/The Greens	G–EFA
Edith Müller	Alliance '90/The Greens	G–EFA
Elisabeth Schroedter	Alliance '90/The Greens	G–EFA
Irene Soltwedel-Schäfer	Alliance '90/The Greens	G–EFA
Wilfried Telkämper	Alliance '90/The Greens	G–EFA
Wolfgang Ullmann	Alliance '90/The Greens	G–EFA
Frieder Otto Wolf	Alliance '90/The Greens	G–EFA
Gerhard Botz	Social Democratic Party	SOC
Heinke Salisch (until 1 February 1996) Dietrich Elchlepp (from 6 February 1996)	Social Democratic Party	SOC
Evelyne Gebhardt	Social Democratic Party	SOC
Norbert Glante	Social Democratic Party	SOC
Willi Görlach	Social Democratic Party	SOC
Lissy Gröner	Social Democratic Party	SOC
Klaus Hänsch	Social Democratic Party	SOC
Jutta Haug	Social Democratic Party	SOC
Magdalene Hoff	Social Democratic Party	SOC
Karin Jöns	Social Democratic Party	SOC
Karin Junker	Social Democratic Party	SOC
Heinz Kindermann	Social Democratic Party	SOC
Constanze Krehl	Social Democratic Party	SOC
Wilfried Kuckelkorn	Social Democratic Party	SOC
Helmut Kuhne	Social Democratic Party	SOC
Annemarie Kuhn	Social Democratic Party	SOC
Bernd Lange	Social Democratic Party	SOC
Rolf Linkohr	Social Democratic Party	SOC
Günter Lüttge	Social Democratic Party	SOC
Erika Mann	Social Democratic Party	SOC
Helwin Peter	Social Democratic Party	SOC
Willi Piecyk	Social Democratic Party	SOC
Christa Randzio-Plath	Social Democratic Party	SOC
Bernhard Rapkay	Social Democratic Party	SOC
Klaus Rehder	Social Democratic Party	SOC
Dagmar Roth-Behrendt	Social Democratic Party	SOC
Mechtild Rothe	Social Democratic Party	SOC
Willi Rothley	Social Democratic Party	SOC
Jannis Sakellariou	Social Democratic Party	SOC
Detlev Samland	Social Democratic Party	SOC
Axel Schäfer	Social Democratic Party	SOC
Gerhard Schmid	Social Democratic Party	SOC
Barbara Schmidbauer	Social Democratic Party	SOC
Martin Schulz	Social Democratic Party	SOC
Ulrich Stockmann	Social Democratic Party	SOC
Christof Tannert	Social Democratic Party	SOC
Ralf Walter	Social Democratic Party	SOC
Barbara Weiler	Social Democratic Party	SOC
Rosemarie Wemheuer	Social Democratic Party	SOC
Wilmya Zimmermann	Social Democratic Party	SOC

=== Party representation ===
National party	EP Group	Seats	±
Social Democratic Party	PES	40 / 99	▲10
Christian Democratic Union	EPP	39 / 99	▲15
Alliance '90/The Greens	G	12 / 99	▲4
Christian Social Union (Bavaria)	EPP	8 / 99	▲1
