= List of members of the European Parliament (1994–1999) =

This is a list from 19 July 1999.

== A ==
Name	Country	National party	European fraction
Gordon Adam	United Kingdom	Labour	
Magda Aelvoet	Belgium	Agalev	
Maria Aglietta			
Nuala Ahern	Ireland	Green Party	
Sylviane Ainardi	France	French Communist Party	
Alexandros Alavanos	Greece	Synaspismós	
Blaise Aldo			
Amedeo Amadeo			
Georgios Anastassopoulos	Greece		
Jan Andersson (politician)	Sweden	Swedish Social Democratic Party	
Anne André-Léonard	Belgium	Reformist Movement	

- Niall Andrews
- Roberta Angelilli
- Julio Añoveros Trias de Bes
- Bernard Antony
- Pedro Aparicio Sánchez
- Javier Areitio Toledo
- Stylianos Argyros
- Miguel Arias Cañete
- Aldo Arroni
- Corrado Augias
- Paraskevas Avgerinos
- Claudio Azzolini

== B ==
- Jean Baggioni
- Francesco Baldarelli
- Monica Baldi
- Valerio Baldini
- Richard Balfe
- Mary Banotti
- Otto Bardong
- Enrique Barón Crespo
- José Barros Moura
- Christine Barthet-Mayer
- Roger Barton
- Roberto Barzanti
- Jean-Pierre Bazin
- Jean-Pierre Bébéar
- Francisca Bennasar Tous
- Rolf Berend
- Pervenche Berés
- Maria Berger
- Pierre Bernard-Reymond
- Antoine-François Bernardini
- Jan Bertens
- Georges Berthu
- Fausto Bertinotti
- Gerardo Bianco
- Angela Billingham
- Freddy Blak
- Undine-Uta Bloch von Blottnitz
- Johannes Blokland
- Yvan Blot
- Reimer Böge
- Herbert Bösch
- Jens-Peter Bonde
- Gian Boniperti
- Rinaldo Bontempi
- Johanna Boogerd-Quaak
- Umberto Bossi
- Gerhard Botz
- Jean-Louis Bourlanges
- David Bowe
- Hiltrud Breyer
- Laurens Jan Brinkhorst
- Elmar Brok
- Carlos Bru Purón
- Stéphane Buffetaut
- Staffan Burenstam Linder
- Giovanni Burtone

== C ==
- Jesús Cabezón Alonso
- Christian Cabrol
- Ernesto Caccavale
- Luigi Caligaris
- Felipe Camisón Asensio
- António Campos
- Luis Campoy Zueco
- Carlos Candal
- Maria Cardona
- Marie-Arlette Carlotti
- Gunilla Carlsson
- Carlos Carnero González
- Pierre Carniti
- Hélène Carrère d'Encausse
- Gaetano Carrozzo
- Hadar Cars
- Pier Casini
- Carlo Casini
- Bryan Cassidy
- Bernard Castagnede
- Pierluigi Castagnetti
- Luciana Castellina
- Frits Castricum
- Gérard Caudron
- Charlotte Cederschiöld
- Marco Cellai
- Ozan Ceyhun
- Raphaël Chanterie
- Raymond Chesa
- Giles Chichester
- Efthymios Christodoulou
- Kenneth Coates
- Carlos Coelho
- Daniel Cohn-Bendit
- Luigi Colajanni
- Juan Colino Salamanca
- Ombretta Colli
- Kenneth Collins
- Gerry Collins
- Joan Colom I Naval
- Maria Colombo Svevo
- Richard Corbett
- Petrus Cornelissen
- Quinido Correia
- John Corrie
- Carlos Costa Neves
- Jean-Pierre Cot
- Jean-Louis Cottigny
- Pat Cox
- Peter Crampton
- Christine Crawley
- Brian Crowley
- Arlindo Cunha
- Tony Cunningham
- John Cushnahan

== D ==
- Gérard d'Aboville
- Hedy d'Ancona
- Georges de Brémond d'Ars
- Elisa Damião
- Alessandro Danesin
- Pieter Dankert
- Danielle Darras
- Michel Dary
- Katerina Daskalaki
- Wayne David
- Willy De Clercq
- Philippe De Coene
- Laura De Esteban Martin
- Biagio De Giovanni
- Stefano De Luca
- Eurico De Melo
- Francis Decourriere
- Claude Delcroix
- Gianfranco Dell'Alba
- Marie-José Denys
- Gérard Deprez
- Edouard Des Places
- Claude Desama
- Pietro Di Prima
- Karel Dillen
- Giorgos Dimitrakopoulos
- Jacques Donnay
- Brendan Donnelly
- Alan Donnelly
- Jörn Donner
- Bárbara Dührkop Dührkop
- Olivier Duhamel
- Olivier Dupuis
- Lone Dybkjær
- Charles de Gaulle
- Henri de Lassus Saint Genies
- Marie-France de Rose

== E ==
- Michl Ebner
- Doeke Eisma
- Dietrich Elchlepp
- James Elles
- Michael Elliott
- Mireille Elmalan
- Vassilis Ephremidis
- Marianne Eriksson
- Manuel Escola Hernando
- José Escudero
- María Estevan Bolea
- Harald Ettl
- Robert Evans
- Winifred Ewing

== F ==
- Juan Fabra Vallés
- Hervé Fabre-Aubrespy
- Alex Falconer
- Giulio Fantuzzi
- Gipo Farassino
- Raimondo Fassa
- Ben Fayot
- Markus Ferber
- Daniel Féret
- Fernando Fernández Martín
- Gerardo Fernández-Albor
- Concepció Ferrer
- Enrico Ferri
- Livio Filippi
- Gianfranco Fini
- Jim Fitzsimons
- Marialiese Flemming
- Karl-Heinz Florenz
- Luigi Florio
- Nicole Fontaine
- Alessandro Fontana
- Glyn Ford
- Marco Formentini
- Antoinette Fouque
- André Fourcans
- Carmen Fraga Estévez
- Ingo Friedrich
- Friedhelm Frischenschlager
- Manuela Frutos Gama
- Honor Funk

== G ==
- Michael Gahler
- Per Gahrton
- Gerardo Galeote Quecedo
- Pat "the Cope" Gallagher
- Ludivina García Arias
- José García-Margallo y Marfil
- Riccardo Garosci
- Georges Garot
- Salvador Garriga Polledo
- Carles-Alfred Gasòliba I Böhm
- Evelyne Gebhardt
- Fiorella Ghilardotti
- Jean-Antoine Giansily
- José Gil-Robles Gil-Delgado
- Alan Gillis
- José Girão Pereira
- Norbert Glante
- Anne-Karin Glase
- Robert Goedbloed
- Lutz Goepel
- Charles Goerens
- Willi Görlach
- Bruno Gollnisch
- Alfred Gomolka
- Laura González Álvarez
- Antonio González Triviño
- Friedrich-Wilhelm Graefe zu Baringdorf
- Ilona Graenitz
- Antonio Graziani
- Pauline Green
- Lissy Gröner
- Mathieu Grosch
- Françoise Grossetête
- Maren Günther
- Armelle Guinebertiere
- Antoni Gutiérrez Díaz

== H ==
- Bertel Haarder
- Karl Habsburg-Lothringen
- Klaus Hänsch
- Gerhard Hager
- David Hallam
- José Happart
- Veronica Hardstaff
- Lyndon Harrison
- Konstantinos Hatzidakis
- Jutta Haug
- Heidi Hautala
- Hilde Hawlicek
- Renate Heinisch
- Mark Hendrick
- Fernand Herman
- Marie-Thérèse Hermange
- Jorge Hernandez Mollar
- Philippe Herzog
- Michael Hindley
- Magdalene Hoff
- Ulf Holm
- Karsten Hoppenstedt
- Jean-François Hory
- Richard Howitt
- Ian Hudghton
- Stephen Hughes
- Anneli Hulthén
- John Hume
- Liam Hyland

== I ==
- Raimo Ilaskivi
- Inna Ilivitzky
- Renzo Imbeni
- John Iversen
- Juan Izquierdo Collado
- María Izquierdo Rojo

== J ==
- Caroline Jackson
- James Janssen van Raay
- Georg Jarzembowski
- Thierry Jean-Pierre
- Lis Jensen
- Kirsten Jensen
- Karin Jöns
- Salvador Jové Peres
- Karin Junker

== K ==
- Nikitas Kaklamanis
- Anna Karamanou
- Roger Karoutchi
- Giorgos Katiforis
- Edward Kellett-Bowman
- Hedwig Keppelhoff-Wiechert
- Hugh Kerr
- Marie-Paule Kestelijn-Sierens
- Mark Killilea Jnr
- Heinz Kindermann
- Glenys Kinnock
- Peter Kittelmann
- Eva Kjer Hansen
- Christa Klaß
- Konstadinos Klironomos
- Dieter-Lebrecht Koch
- Niels Kofoed
- Angela Kokkola
- Christoph Konrad
- Ole Krarup
- Constanze Krehl
- Wolfgang Kreissl-Dörfler
- Frode Kristoffersen
- Johann Kronberger
- Wilfried Kuckelkorn
- Annemarie Kuhn
- Helmut Kuhne

== L ==
- Giorgio La Malfa
- Carlos Lage
- Jan Lagendijk
- André Laignel
- Catherine Lalumiere
- Irini Lambraki
- Panayotis Lambrias
- Carl Lang
- Bernd Lange
- Werner Langen
- Brigitte Langenhagen
- Paul Lannoye
- Jessica Larive
- Pierre Lataillade
- Ritva Laurila
- Jean-Marie Le Chevallier
- Jean-Yves Le Gallou
- Jean-Marie Le Pen
- Fernand Le Rachinel
- Bernard Lehideux
- Klaus-Heiner Lehne
- Marlene Lenz
- Giacomo Leopardi
- Odile Leperre-Verrier
- Marie-Noëlle Lienemann
- Peter Liese
- Giancarlo Ligabue
- Michèle Lindeperg
- Malou Lindholm
- Hans Lindqvist
- Rolf Linkohr
- Franz Linser
- Maj-Lis Lööw
- Alfred Lomas
- Günter Lüttge
- Klaus Lukas
- Astrid Lulling

== M ==
- Nelly Maes
- Johanna Maij-Weggen
- Kurt Malangré
- Franco Malerba
- Bernie Malone
- Lucio Manisco
- Thomas Mann
- Erika Mann
- Andrea Manzella
- Marilena Marin
- Luis Marinho
- Elena Marinucci
- Alfonso Marra
- Pedro Marset Campos
- Wilfried Martens
- Philippe-Armand Martin
- David Martin
- Jean-Claude Martinez
- Graham Mather
- Marjo Matikainen-Kallström
- Xaver Mayer
- Linda McAvan
- Arlene McCarthy
- Joe McCartin
- Michael McGowan
- Anne McIntosh
- Patricia McKenna
- Hugh McMahon
- Edward McMillan-Scott
- Eryl McNally
- Manuel Medina Ortega
- Thomas Megahy
- Bruno Mégret
- José Mendes Bota
- Iñigo Méndez de Vigo
- José Mendiluce Pereiro
- Nélio Mendonça
- Winfried Menrad
- Alman Metten
- Roberto Mezzaroma
- Bill Miller
- Joaquim Miranda
- Ana Miranda De Lage
- Abdelkader Mohamed Ali
- Peter Mombaur
- Philippe Monfils
- Fernando Moniz
- James Moorhouse
- Gisèle Moreau
- Luigi Moretti
- Eluned Morgan
- David Morris
- Giuseppe Mottola
- Nana Mouskouri
- Edith Müller
- Jan Mulder
- Simon Murphy
- Cristiana Muscardini
- Sebastiano Musumeci
- Marie-Thérèse Mutin
- Riitta Myller

== N ==
- Pasqualina Napoletano
- Hartmut Nassauer
- Clive Needle
- Riccardo Nencini
- Stan Newens
- Edward Newman
- Annemie Neyts-Uyttebroeck
- Jim Nicholson
- Jean-Thomas Nordmann
- Honório Novo

== O ==
- Christine Oddy
- Karl-Erik Olsson
- Ria Oomen-Ruijten
- Arie Oostlander
- Leoluca Orlando
- Jyrki Otila

== P ==
- Reino Paasilinna
- Pertti Paasio
- Doris Pack
- Aline Pailler
- Ian Paisley
- Ana Palacio Vallelersundi
- Veronika Palm
- Stylianos Panagopoulos
- Nikolaos Papakyriazis
- Mihalis Papagiannakis
- Gastone Parigi
- Eolo Parodi
- Jean-Claude Pasty
- Karla Peijs
- Fernando Pérez Royo
- Roy Perry
- Helwin Peter
- Luciano Pettinari
- Peter Pex
- Wilhelm Piecyk
- Carlos Pimenta
- Eric Pinel
- Hubert Pirker
- Elly Plooij-Van Gorsel
- Lord Plumb
- Guido Podestà
- Hans-Gert Poettering
- Danilo Poggiolini
- Samuli Pohjamo
- Anne Poisson
- Anita Pollack
- José Pomés Ruiz
- Alain Pompidou
- Josep Pons Grau
- Manuel Porto
- José Posada González
- Bernd Posselt
- Pierre Pradier
- Bartho Pronk
- James Provan
- Alonso Puerta

== Q ==
- Jean Querbes
- Godelieve Quisthoudt-Rowohl

== R ==
- Reinhard Rack
- Juan Ramírez-Heredia
- Christa Randzio-Plath
- Bernhard Rapkay
- Daniela Raschhofer
- Giuseppe Rauti
- Imelda Read
- Viviane Reding
- Encarnación Redondo Jiménez
- Klaus Rehder
- Sérgio Ribeiro
- Karin Riis-Jørgensen
- Günter Rinsche
- Carlo Ripa Di Meana
- Carlos Robles Piquer
- Michel Rocard
- Raúl Rosado Fernandes
- Dagmar Roth-Behrendt
- Mechtild Rothe
- Willi Rothley
- Yoannis Roubatis
- Christian Rovsing
- Paul Rübig
- Giorgio Ruffolo
- Mirja Ryynänen

== S ==
- André Sainjon
- Dominique Saint-Pierre
- Jannis Sakellariou
- José Salafranca Sánchez-Neyra
- Detlev Samland
- Ulla Sandbæk
- Yvonne Sandberg-Fries
- Giacomo Santini
- Francisco Sanz Fernández
- Pavlos Sarlis
- Francisca Sauquillo Pérez del Arco
- Umberto Scapagnini
- Michel Scarbonchi
- Axel Schäfer
- Anne-Marie Schaffner
- Edgar Schiedermeier
- Agnes Schierhuber
- Luciano Schifone
- Marcel Schlechter
- Ursula Schleicher
- Poul Schlüter
- Gerhard Schmid
- Barbara Schmidbauer
- Horst Schnellhardt
- Inger Schörling
- Jürgen Schröder
- Elisabeth Schroedter
- Martin Schulz
- Konrad Schwaiger
- Barry Seal
- Carlo Secchi
- Françoise Seillier
- Esko Seppänen
- Peter Sichrovsky
- Angela Sierra González
- Brian Simpson
- Niels Sindal
- Joaquín Sisó Cruellas
- Jonas Sjöstedt
- Peter Skinner
- Alex Smith
- Irene Soltwedel-Schäfer
- Jan Sonneveld
- María Sornosa Martínez
- Dominique Souchet
- André Soulier
- Antoinette Spaak
- Roberto Speciale
- Tom Spencer
- Shaun Spiers
- Per Stenmarck
- Ursula Stenzel
- Dirk Sterckx
- John Stevens
- Jack Stewart-Clark
- Marie-France Stirbois
- Ulrich Stockmann
- Frédéric Striby
- Robert Sturdy
- Jörn Svensson
- Johannes Swoboda

== T ==
- Antonio Tajani
- Gianni Tamino
- Christof Tannert
- Michael Tappin
- Salvatore Tatarella
- Christiane Taubira-Delannon
- Wilfried Telkämper
- Anna Terrón I Cusí
- Robin Teverson
- Diemut Theato
- Ioannis Theonas
- Maj Theorin
- David Thomas
- Astrid Thors
- Marianne Thyssen
- Stanislaw Tillich
- Leo Tindemans
- Gary Titley
- Luisa Todini
- John Tomlinson
- Carole Tongue
- José Torres Couto
- D. Torres Marques
- Antonios Trakatellis
- Antonio Trizza
- Peter Truscott
- Dimitris Tsatsos

== U ==
- Wolfgang Ullmann

== V ==
- Leonie van Bladel
- Rijk van Dam
- Otto von Habsburg
- Maartje van Putten
- Paavo Väyrynen
- Jaime Valdivielso De Cué
- Joan Vallvé
- José Valverde López
- Anne Van Lancker
- Frank Vanhecke
- Daniel Varela Suanzes-Carpegna
- D. Vaz Da Silva
- Luciano Vecchi
- W.G. van Velzen
- Wim van Velzen
- Josep Verde I Aldea
- Yves Verwaerde
- Guido Viceconte
- Luigi Vinci
- Vincenzo Viola
- Ivar Virgin
- Kyösti Virrankoski
- Johannes Voggenhuber

== W ==
- Karl von Wogau
- Susan Waddington
- Ralf Walter
- Graham Watson
- Mark Watts
- Jup Weber
- Barbara Weiler
- Rosemarie Wemheuer
- Ian White
- Phillip Whitehead
- Sören Wibe
- Jan Wiebenga
- Rainer Wieland
- Jan Wiersma
- Florus Wijsenbeek
- Frederik Willockx
- Joe Wilson
- Friedrich Wolf
- Francis Wurtz
- Terence Wynn

== Z ==
- Wilmya Zimmermann

== See also ==
- 1994 European Parliament election
- Members of the European Parliament 1994–1999
