= List of observers to the European Parliament for East Germany, 1991–1994 =

Members of the European Parliament for Germany
ECSC delegation	(1952)
EP delegation	(1958)
1st term	(1979)
2nd term	(1984)
3rd term: (West Germany: 1989); (East Germany: 1991)
4th term	(1994)
5th term	(1999)
6th term	(2004)
7th term	(2009)
8th term	(2014)
9th term	(2019)
10th term	(2024)

This is a list of the 18 observers to the European Parliament for East Germany in the 1989–1994 session. They were appointed by the German Bundestag as observers from 21 February 1991 during German reunification.

== List ==
Image	Name	Born	Political party	Group	Notes
	Rolf Berend	1943	Christian Democratic Union	EPP	
	Gerhard Botz	1955	Social Democratic Party	SOC	
	Wolfgang Fiedler	1951	Christian Democratic Union	EPP	Retired in 1992
	Anne-Karin Glase	1954	Christian Democratic Union	EPP	
	Lutz Goepel	1942	Christian Democratic Union	EPP	
	Karl Hagemann	1941	Christian Democratic Union	EPP	
	Sylvia-Yvonne Kaufmann	1955	PDS	EUL	
	Norbert Kertscher	1954	PDS	EUL	
	Lothar Klein	1956	DSU (until 1993, then CDU )	EPP	Replaced Gotthard Voigt; elected via the list of the CDU/CSU parliamentary group
	Dieter-Lebrecht Koch	1953	Christian Democratic Union	EPP	
	Albert Kosler	1933	Christian Democratic Union	EPP	Replaced Wolfgang Fiedler
	Constanze Krehl	1956	Social Democratic Party	SOC	
	Hanns-Ulrich Meisel	1943	GREEN		
	Edelbert Richter	1943	Social Democratic Party	SOC	
	Walter Romberg	1928	Social Democratic Party	SOC	
	Jurgen Schroeder	1940	Christian Democratic Union	EPP	
	Ulrich Stockmann	1951	Social Democratic Party	SOC	
	Hans-Peter Thietz	1934	Free Democratic Party	LDR	
	Stanislav Tillich	1959	Christian Democratic Union	EPP	
	Gotthard Voigt	1928	DSU		Died 10 June 1991; elected via the list of the CDU/CSU parliamentary group

== See also ==
- Members of the European Parliament
- List of members of the European Parliament, 1989–1994
