= Hedwig Keppelhoff-Wiechert =

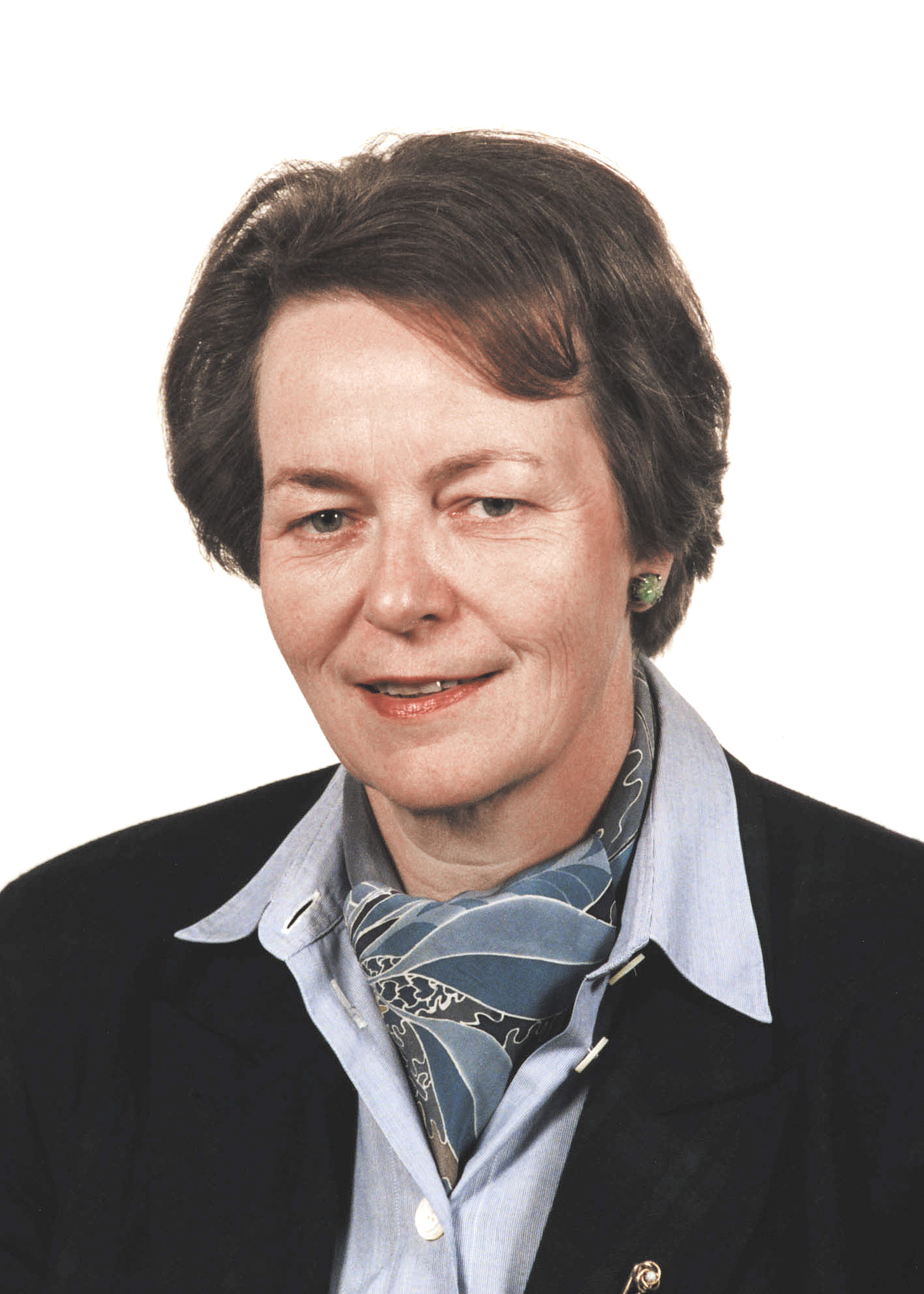
- Hedwig Keppelhoff-Wiechert in 1994

Member of the European Parliament
- In office 1989–2004

Personal details
- Born: 31 May 1939 (age 87) Südlohn, Münsterland, Germany
- Party: Christian Democratic Union

Hedwig Keppelhoff-Wiechert (born 31 May 1939) is a German politician from the Christian Democratic Union (CDU). She served as a Member of the European Parliament from 1989 to 2004. She is a former president of the German Rural Women's Association.

== Biography ==
After attending university, Keppelhoff successfully completed her master's examination in rural home economics. She initially served as chairwoman of the Velen Rural Women's Association, later in the Borken district, and as president of the Westphalian-Lippe Rural Women's Association. From 1987 to 1998, she was president of the German Rural Women's Association. She also chaired the Rural Education Center, the Westphalia-Lippe Continuing Education Association, and the Federal Association for Farm Holidays.

Keppelhoff was politically active in the CDU, where she served on the Borken district executive committee and the state executive committee. From 1976 to 1991, she was a member of the rural women's committee of COPA, part of COPA-COGECA, and served as its vice president from 1986 to 1989.

She was elected to represent Germany in the European Parliament in 1989, where she served until 2004.

== Honours ==
- Federal Cross of Merit (22 October 1996)
- Golden Bee of the German Country Women's Association
- Golden Chamber Plaque of the Chamber of Agriculture

== See also ==
- List of members of the European Parliament for Germany, 1989–1994
- List of members of the European Parliament for Germany, 1994–1999
- List of members of the European Parliament for Germany, 1999–2004
