= Lothar Klein =

German politician (1956–2025)

Member of the Volkskammer
- In office 18 March 1990 – 2 October 1990

Observer to the European Parliament for East Germany
- In office 1991–1994

Personal details
- Born: 15 May 1956 Dresden, East Germany
- Died: 5 November 2025 (aged 69) Dresden, Germany
- Political party: DSU; CDU
- Occupation: Electrician

Lothar Klein (15 May 1956 – 5 November 2025), was a German politician. A member of the German Social Union and the Christian Democratic Union, he served in the Volkskammer from March to October 1990 and was an observer to the European Parliament for East Germany from 1991 to 1994.

Klein died in Dresden on 5 November 2025, at the age of 69.
