= Marlene Lenz =

German politician (born 1932)

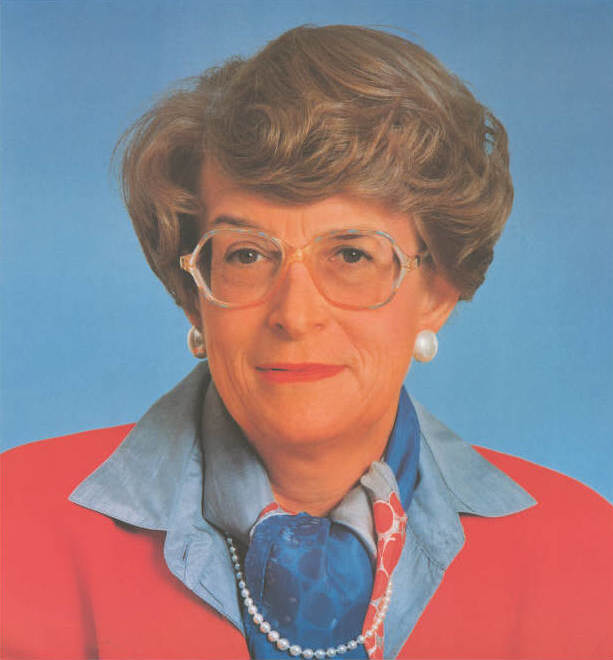

Member of the European Parliament
- In office 17 July 1979 – 19 July 1999
- Parliamentary group: European People's Party Group
- Constituency: West Germany (1979–1990); Germany (1990–1999)

Personal details
- Born: 4 July 1932 (age 94) Berlin, Germany
- Party: Christian Democratic Union of Germany

Marlene Lenz (born 4 July 1932) is a German Christian Democratic Union of Germany (CDU) politician and translator who served four terms as a Member of the European Parliament in the European Parliament from 1979 to 1999. She worked for the French Europa League, the German Atlantic Society, the European Economic Community's European Commission and was secretary-general and later vice-president of the European Union of Women. Lenz was also involved in local politics for the CDU in Bonn.

== Early life ==
On 4 July 1932, Lenz was born in Berlin, the second of four children of the lawyer Otto Lenz and his wife Marieliese, née Pohl. She and her family relocated to Munich in 1946 and passed her Abitur at Gymnasium bei St. Anna four years later. Lenz went on to study economics and languages at Heidelberg University between 1951 and 1953, graduating as a certified translator in English and French.

== Career ==
Her first job was as a translator for the French Europa Union between 1954 and 1956. Lenz worked professionally at the German Atlantic Society in Bonn from 1956 to 1958, the European Economic Community's European Commission in Brussels during the cabinet of Jean Rey between 1958 and 1963 and was then a clerk in the General Directorate for Foreign Relations from 1966 to 1968. In 1968, Lenz joined the Christian Democratic Union of Germany's (CDU) federal office as a women's officer and had the responsibility for the publication of the magazine Frau und Politik for the CDU's women's association for several years. She was secretary-general of the European Union of Women between 1968 and 1971 and was its vice-president from 1977 to 1983. Lenz was employed as a consultant in the CDU's Office for Foreign Relations in 1972 and was a research assistant to the inquiry commission Women and Society in the Bundestag.

At the 1979 European Parliament election in West Germany, she was elected as a CDU Member of the European Parliament (MEP) for the West Germany constituency and took office on 17 July 1979. Lenz was one of twelve German woman politicians to gain election to the European Parliament at the election. She was a member of the European People's Party Group. Lenz was a member of the Committee on External Economic Relations, the Political Affairs Committee and the Delegation for relations with Cyprus and was vice-chair of the Committee of inquiry into the Situation of Women in Europe during her first term. Lenz gained reelection to the West Germany constituency of the European Parliament at the 1984 European Parliament election in West Germany. She continued to serve as a member of the Political Affairs Committee but also became a member of the Delegation for relations with the countries of South America, the Delegation for relations with the countries of Central America and the Contadora Group. Lenz was a substitute of both the Committee on the Environment, Public Health and Consumer Protection and the Committee on External Economic Relations and was vice-chair of the Committee on Women's Rights from 26 July 1984 to 20 January 1987.

She was reelected to a third term in the European Parliament at the 1989 European Parliament election in West Germany. Lenz continued to be a member of the Delegation for relations with the countries of South America, the Committee on Women's Rights, the Political Affairs Committee but was now on the Subcommittee on Human Rights and the Committee on Foreign Affairs and Security. She was a substitute of each of the Delegation to the EC-Finland Joint Parliamentary Committee, the Delegation to the EU-Finland Joint Parliamentary Committee, the Delegation for relations with Finland and the Committee on External Economic Relations. Lenz gained her fourth term in the European Parliament at the 1994 European Parliament election in Germany. She was a member and later chair of the Subcommittee on Human Rights. Lenz was a member of the Committee on Foreign Affairs, Security and Defence Policy, the Delegation for relations with the countries of South America (later and MERCOSUR) and the Committee on Foreign Affairs, Security and Defence Policy. Lenz was a substitute on each of the Committee on External Economic Relations, the Committee on Institutional Affairs, the Committee on Women's Rights, the Delegation for relations with Lithuania and the Delegation to the EU-Lithuania Joint Parliamentary Committee. From 1995 to 1999, she served on the Bundestag Committee on European Union Affairs. Lenz retired as an MEP on 19 July 1999.

Outside of national and European politics, she worked for the Central Committee of German Catholics (ZDK) and was a member of its executive committee. Lenz was on the ZDK's Commission 10 "Europe" for multiple years. Lenz worked for the CDU's Bonn district association, working as its deputy chair of the district women's association in Bonn and was a member of the board of the state women's association of the Rhineland. She was a campaigner for compensatory measures for Bonn. In 1994, Lenz authored Der Weg der Frau in der Politik.

== Personal life ==
Lenz resides in Bonn and is unmarried. She is Roman Catholic. In 1990, Lenz was appointed Officer's Cross of the Order of Merit of the Federal Republic of Germany and was upgraded to the Commander's Cross of the Order of Merit of the Federal Republic of Germany nine years later.
