= Bernhard Rapkay =

German politician (born 1951)

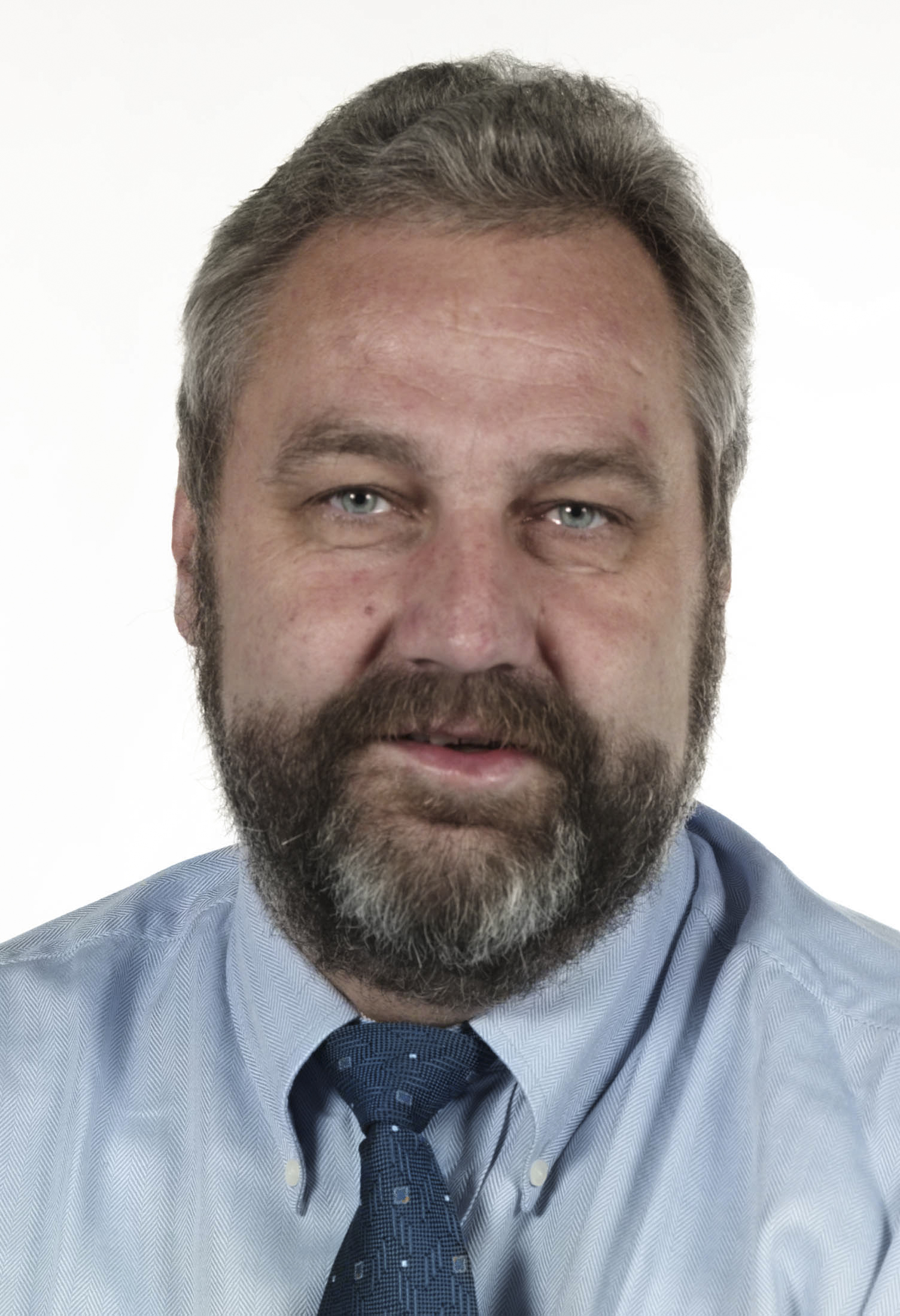
- Rapkay in 1999

Member of the European Parliament for Germany
- In office 19 July 1994 – 1 July 2014

Personal details
- Born: 8 January 1951 (age 74); Ludwigsburg, Baden-Württemburg, West Germany
- Political party: SPD

Bernhard Rapkay (born 8 January 1951) is a German politician who served as a Member of the European Parliament from 1994 until 2014. He is a member of the Social Democratic Party of Germany, part of the Socialist Group.

During his time parliament, Rapkay sat on the European Parliament's Committee on Economic and Monetary Affairs. He was also a substitute for the Committee on Industry, Research and Energy, a member of the delegation to the EU-Ukraine Parliamentary Cooperation Committee and a substitute for the Delegation for relations with the countries of Southeast Asia and the Association of Southeast Asian Nations (ASEAN).

== Previous employment ==
- Various jobs in adult education, public relations, and project management

== Career ==
- 1991-1999: Various offices with the SPD (since 1975), including Chairman of the Dortmund SPD
- 1991-1999: Member of the Western Westphalia District Executive
- Member of the SPD Regional Executive of the North Rhine-Westphalia
- Member of the SPD Regional Presidium, North Rhine-Westphalia
- Vice-chairman of the SPD Federal Party Council
- Chairman of the SPD group, European Parliament

== See also ==
- 2004 European Parliament election in Germany
