= Reimer Böge =

German politician (born 1951)

Reimer Böge MEP
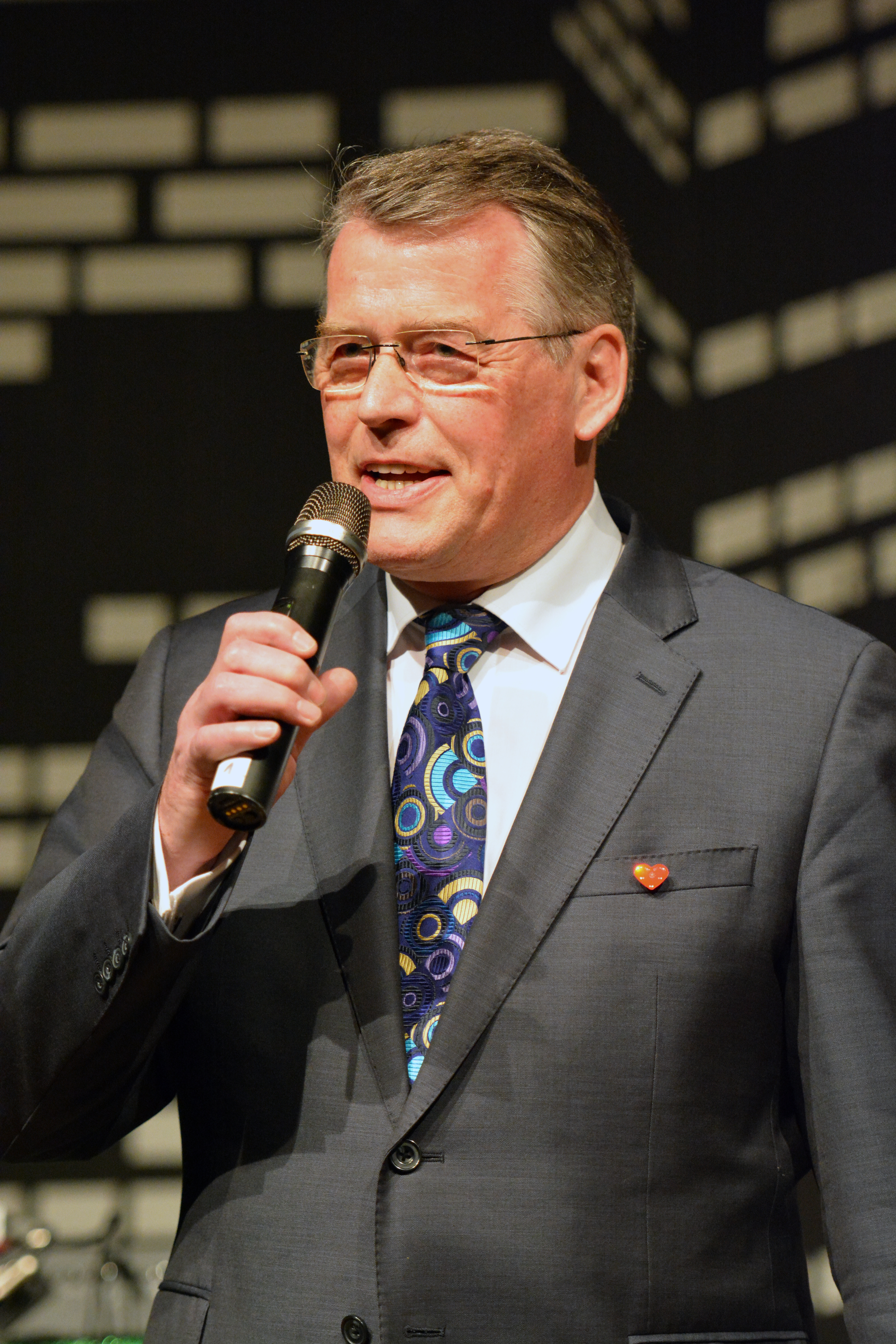

Member of the European Parliament
- In office 1 July 1989 – 1 July 2019
- Constituency: Germany

Personal details
- Born: 18 December 1951 (age 74) Hasenmoor, West Germany
- Party: German: Christian Democratic Union; EU: European People's Party
- Education: University of Kiel
- Website: www.reimerboege.de

Reimer Böge (born 18 December 1951) is a German politician who served as Member of the European Parliament (MEP) from 1989 until 2019. He is a member of the Christian Democratic Union of Germany, part of the European People's Party.

== Member of the European Parliament, 1989–present ==
Böge served as vice-chair of the Delegation for relations with Australia and New Zealand, member of the Committee on Budgets and the Special committee on the policy challenges and budgetary resources for a sustainable European Union after 2013 and substitute of the Committee on Foreign Affairs and the Delegation for relations with Japan. In addition, he was standing rapporteur on policy challenges and budgetary means of the enlarged Union 2007–2013.

Böge served as vice-chairman of the Budget Committee and the Parliament's lead negotiator on the EU's financial framework for 2007–13; under his stewardship, the Parliament got an extra €4 billion and the chance to vote on the budget review. He later chaired the Budget Committee from 2007 to 2009, when he was succeeded by Alain Lamassoure. In 2010, he drafted the Parliament's legislative bill on the extra financing needs of €1.4 billion for the International Thermonuclear Experimental Reactor (ITER). Also in 2010, he joined the Friends of the EEAS, an unofficial and independent pressure group formed because of concerns that the High Representative of the Union for Foreign Affairs and Security Policy Catherine Ashton was not paying sufficient attention to the Parliament and was sharing too little information on the formation of the European External Action Service.

In 2009, Böge was a CDU delegate to the Federal Convention for the purpose of electing the President of Germany.

In June 2013, Böge resigned as the EPP group's budget negotiator in protest at an initial compromise deal between the European Parliament, the European Commission under the leadership of José Manuel Barroso and the European Council on a €960 billion budget for 2014–20. Alongside Pervenche Berès, he currently serves as rapporteur on the European Parliament's report on a budgetary capacity for the eurozone.

In September 2017, Reimer announced that he would not stand in the 2019 European elections but instead resign from active politics by the end of the parliamentary term.

== Other activities ==
=== Corporate boards ===
- Vereinigte Tierversicherung Gesellschaft a. G., member of the supervisory board

=== Non-profit organizations ===
- German Animal Breeders Federation (ADT), president
- Conseil Européen des Jeunes Agriculteurs, president (1977–80)
- German Federation of Rural Youth (BDL), deputy chairman (1973–77)

== Recognition ==
- Medal of Exceptional Offer to the Republic of Cyprus

== Personal life ==
Böge and his wife, who is from Cyprus, live in Hasenmoor.
