= Christa Randzio-Plath =

German lawyer and politician

Christa Randzio-Plath MEP
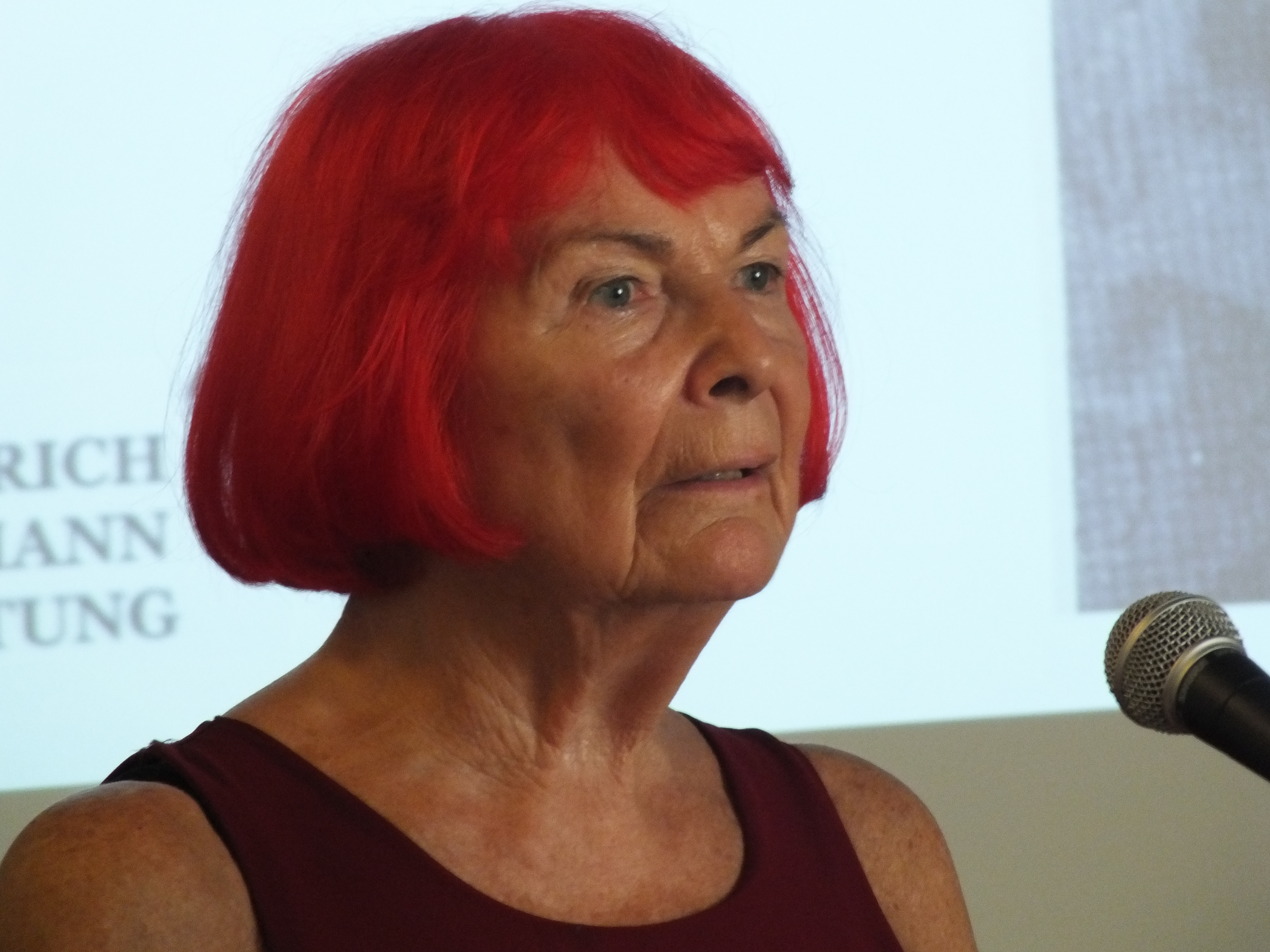
- Randzio-Plath in 2018

Member of the European Parliament for Germany
- In office 1989–2004

Member Hamburg Parliament
- In office 1986–1989

Christa Randzio-Plath (born 29 October 1940) is a German lawyer and politician. She was a Member of the European Parliament from 1989 to 2004, representing the Social Democratic Party of Germany.

She was born in Racibórz, Poland.

From 1986 to 1989 she was a member of the Hamburg Parliament. She was an elected member of the 3rd (1989-1994), 4th (1994-1999) and 5th sessions of the European Parliament.

In 2011 the Senate of Hamburg honoured her with the Bürgermeister-Stolten-Medaille.

She is a member of the law firm of Rechtsanwälte Mille, Sieberth & Randzio-Plath.
