= Werner Langen =

German politician (born 1949)

Werner Langen MEP
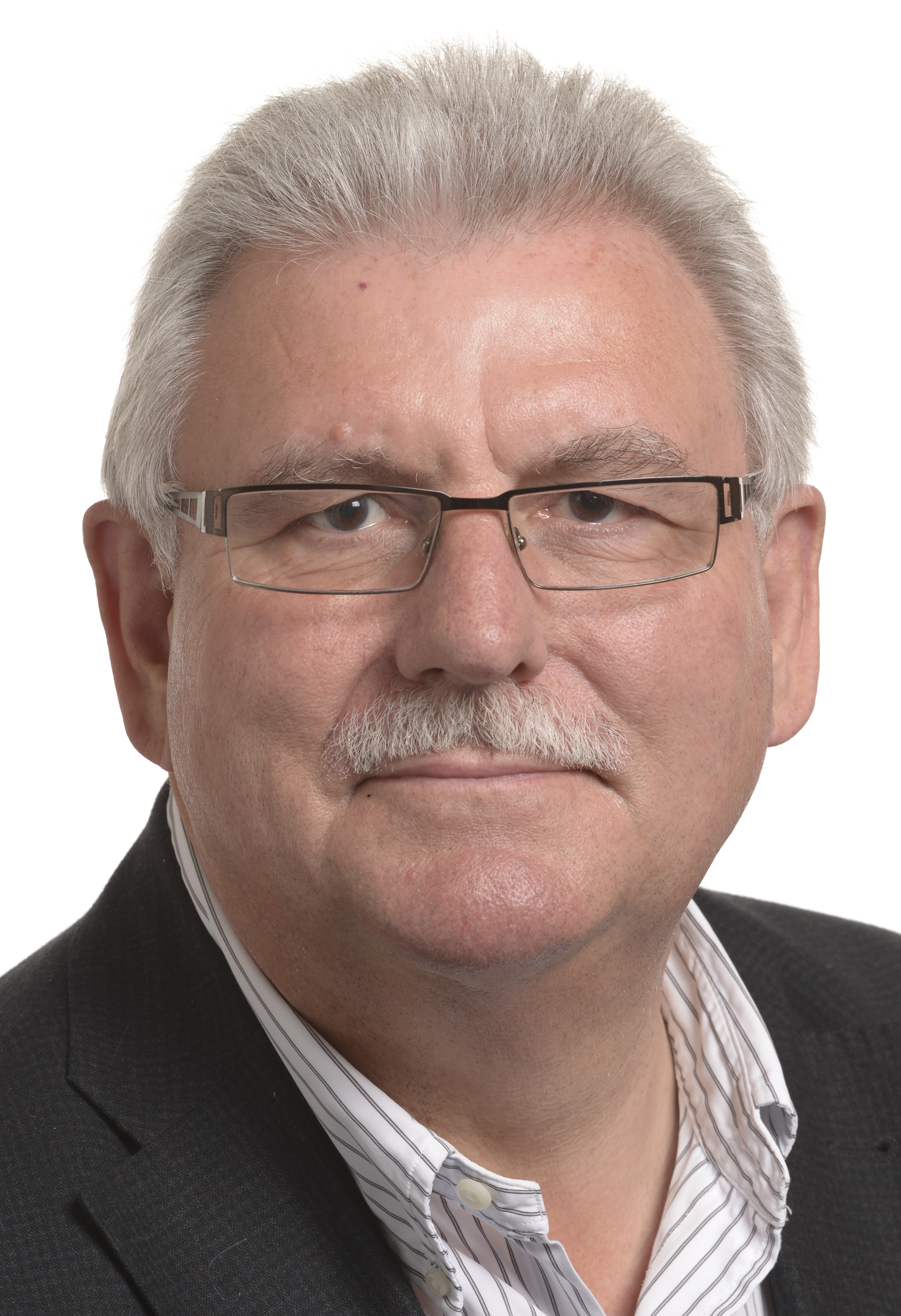

Member of the European Parliament
- In office 1 July 1994 – 2019
- Constituency: Germany

Personal details
- Born: 27 November 1949 (age 76) Müden, Germany
- Party: German: Christian Democratic Union; EU: European People's Party
- Education: University of Bonn; University of Cologne

Werner Langen (born 27 November 1949) is a German politician who served as Member of the European Parliament (MEP) from 1994 until 2019. He is a member of the Christian Democratic Union, part of the European People's Party.

== Political career ==
=== Early beginnings ===
Between 1990 and 1991, Langen served as State Minister for Agriculture in the cabinet of Minister-President Carl-Ludwig Wagner of Rhineland-Palatinate. From 1992 until 1993, he was a member of the CDU executive board under the party's then-chairman, Chancellor Helmut Kohl.

=== Member of the European Parliament, 1994-2019 ===
Langen first became a Member of the European Parliament in the 1994 elections. Throughout his time in office, he served on the Committee on Economic and Monetary Affairs. In this capacity, he was in charge of steering key financial reforms through the European Parliament, including the European Market Infrastructure Regulation (EMIR) and the Insurance Mediation Directive (IMD 2) in 2015. In July 2016, Langen was elected to chair the Parliament's Committee of Inquiry into Money Laundering, Tax Avoidance and Tax Evasion (PANA) that investigated the Panama Papers revelations and tax avoidance schemes more broadly.

Between 1999 and 2009, Langen was a member of the Committee on Industry, Research and Energy, where he served as the European People's Party rapporteur for public services whose remit included competition cases.

Between 2006 and 2012, Langen chaired the CDU/CSU delegation to the European Parliament. In this capacity, he once again served as a member of the CDU executive board, this time under the party's then chairwoman, Chancellor Angela Merkel. In 2010, he was a CDU delegate to the Federal Convention for the purpose of electing the President of Germany.

From 2014 until 2019, Langen was a member of the European Parliament Intergroup on Biodiversity, Countryside, Hunting and Recreational Fisheries.

== Other activities ==
- Konrad Adenauer Foundation (KAS), Member
- European Energy Forum (EEF), Member
- German European Security Association (GESA), Founding Member
- Kangaroo Group, Member
- Ludwig Erhard Foundation, Member
- Pollichia, Member

== Links ==
- "MEP profile: Werner LANGEN". European Parliament.
- "Members of the Committee on the Affairs of the European Union". Bundestag.
- "Ausschuss für die Angelegenheiten der Europäischen Union: Fotoliste der Mitglieder" [Committee on European Union Affairs: Photographic list of members] (in German). Bundestag.
