= Wilmya Zimmermann =

German politician

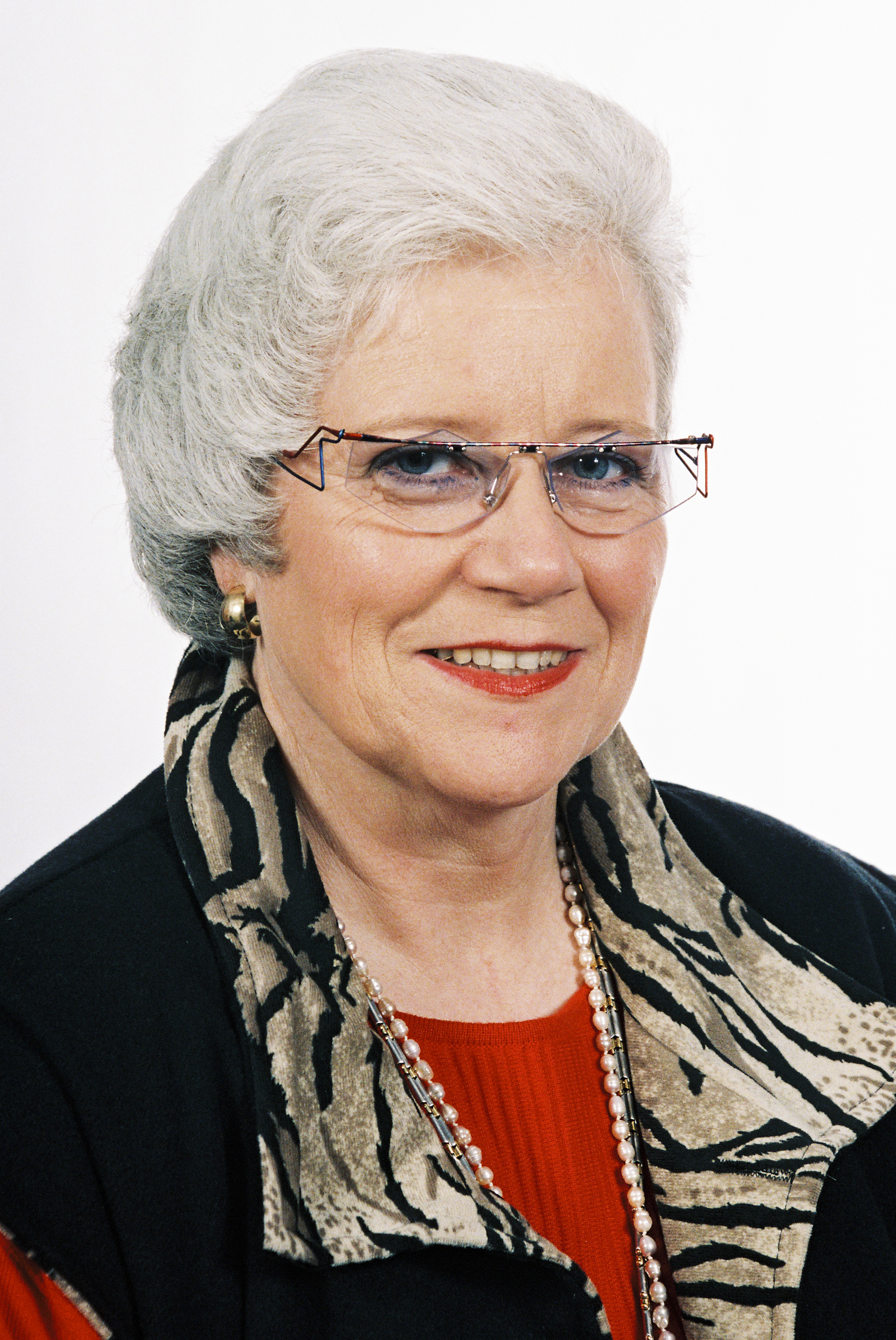

Member of the European Parliament
- In office July 19, 1994 – July 19, 1999
- Constituency: Germany

Personal details
- Born: July 30, 1944 (age 81) Heerlen, Limburg, Netherlands
- Party: Social Democratic Party of Germany

Wilmya Zimmermann (born 30 July 1944) is a German politician who served in the European Parliament from 1994 to 1999.

== Biography ==
Wilmya Zimmermann, who was born on 30 July 1944 in Heerlen, Netherlands, attended secondary school and was trained as and later became a Medical Technician Assistant in a Heerlen hospital and at Radboud University Nijmegen. In 1970, she moved to Germany to take up employment at the University of Marburg. She was later transferred to the University of Erlangen–Nuremberg.

In 1986, Zimmermann joined the Public Services, Transport and Traffic Union. She is a member of Europa-Union Deutschland

Zimmerman was married at some point before 1999.

== Politics ==
In 1988, Zimmermann joined the Social Democratic Party of Germany, and she is the treasurer of the party's Bamberg-Forchheim division.

She was elected to the European Parliament in 1994 and served as a member until 1999. She worked on the committee with diplomatic relations with Romania and Bulgaria. She was the first MEP to be elected in a country of which she did not have citizenship.
