= Magdalene Hoff =

German politician (1940–2017)

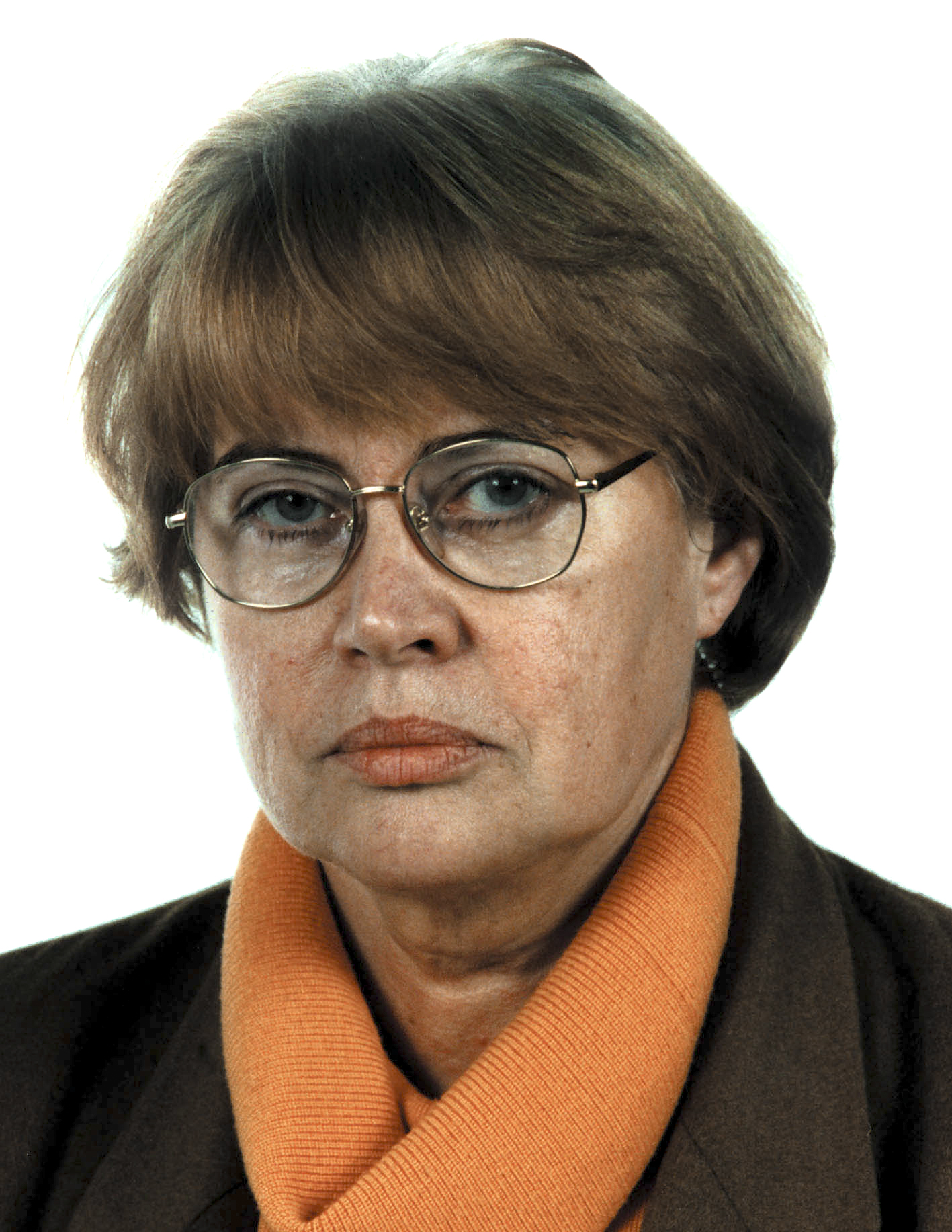
- Hoff in 1994

Member of the European Parliament
- In office 17 July 1979 – 19 July 2004
- Parliamentary group: Socialist Group (1979–1993); Group of the Party of European Socialists (1993–2004)
- Constituency: West Germany (1979–1990); Germany (1990–2004)

Personal details
- Born: Magdalene Allwicher; 26 December 1940 Hagen, Prussia, Germany (now in North Rhine-Westphalia, Germany)
- Died: 28 March 2017 (aged 76)
- Party: Social Democratic Party of Germany

Magdalene Hoff (née Allwicher; 29 December 1940 – 28 March 2017) was a German Social Democratic Party politician who served five terms in the European Parliament as a member of the West Germany constituency and later the constituency of Germany on behalf of the Socialist Group later the Group of the Party of European Socialists then from July 1979 to July 2004. She was vice-president of the European Parliament between 1997 and 1999. Hoff was a member of several committees such as the Committee on Budgetary Control and the Committee on Budgets. She was a recipient of the Commander's Cross of the Order of Merit of the Federal Republic of Germany.

== Biography ==
Hoff was born Magdalene Allwicher in Hagen, then part of the German state of Prussia, on 29 December 1940. She became a member of the Social Democratic Party of Germany in 1971, and was trained as both a civil engineer and a lecturer. From 1975 to 1979, Hoff served as a member of the City Council of Hagen. Following that, she became responsible for the Working Group of Social Democratic Women in the SPD district of Western Westphalia as its district chairperson between 1982 and 1996. Hoff was also party executive for the SPD from 1994 to 1998, and was first deputy chairperson of the Group of the Social Democratic Party of Europe in the European Parliament between 1994 and 1997 and was then the European Parliament's Vice-President from 1997 to 1999.

She was elected to represent the West Germany constituency in the European Parliament on behalf of the Socialist Group at the 1979 European Parliament election in West Germany from 17 July 1979 to 23 July 1984. Hoff was member of the Committee on Budgets and was part of the Delegation to the EEC-Greece Joint Parliamentary Committee and the Delegation for relations with the countries of South Asia. At the 1984 European Parliament election in West Germany, she was reelected to serve in the Second European Parliament again representing the constituency of West Germany between 24 July 1984 and 24 July 1989. Hoff remained on the Committee on Budgets but was now a member of the Committee on Budgetary Control from 1984 to 1987, the Delegation for relations with the United States and the Delegation for relations with the Union of Soviet Socialist Republics. She was a substitute for both the Committee on Women's Rights and the Committee on Budgetary Control between 1987 and 1989.

Hoff again was elected to represent the constituency of West Germany from 25 July 1989 to 18 July 1994 at the 1989 European Parliament election in West Germany, initially for the Socialist Group and then for the Group of the Party of European Socialists from 1993. She was chair of the Delegation for relations with the Union of Soviet Socialist Republics between 1989 and 1992 and the successor Delegation for relations with the Republics of the Commonwealth of Independent States (CIS) from 1992 to 1994. Hoff was a member of the Committee on Economic and Monetary Affairs and Industrial Policy and the Delegation for relations with the Republics of the Commonwealth of Independent States (CIS) before becoming its chair. She was a substitute for the Delegation for relations with Estonia, Latvia and Lithuania, the Committee on Foreign Affairs and Security, the Delegation for relations with Finland, the Committee on Budgetary Control and the Committee on Budgets.

At the 1994 European Parliament election in Germany, Hoff won her fourth re-election to represent the Germany constituency at the Fourth European Parliament from 19 July 1999 to 19 July 1999. She served as vice-chair of the Group of the Party of European Socialists from 1994 to 1997 before becoming the group's member of the bureau between 1997 and 1999. Hoff was vice-chair of the Delegation for relations with Central Asia and Mongolia and was a member of the Committee on Foreign Affairs, Security and Defence Policy and the Delegation for relations with Central Asia and Mongolia. She was a substitute for the Committee on Budgetary Control, the Delegation to the EU-Slovak Republic Joint Parliamentary Committee and the Delegation to the EU-Romania Joint Parliamentary Committee.

Hoff won her fifth re-election to the European Parliament at the 1999 European Parliament election in Germany and served in the Fifth European Parliament between 20 July 1999 and 19 July 2004. She was a member of the Committee on Foreign Affairs, Human Rights, Common Security and Defence Policy and was on the Delegation for relations with the United States. Hoff was a substitute for the Committee on Culture, Youth, Education, the Media and Sport, the Committee on the Environment, Public Health and Consumer Policy and the Delegation to the EU-Lithuania Joint Parliamentary Committee. In 2001, she was awarded the Commander's Cross of the Order of Merit of the Federal Republic of Germany. Hoff died on 28 March 2017 and a funeral service was held for her at the funeral hall of Friedhof Delstern on the afternoon of 3 April.
