= Helmut Kuhne =

German politician

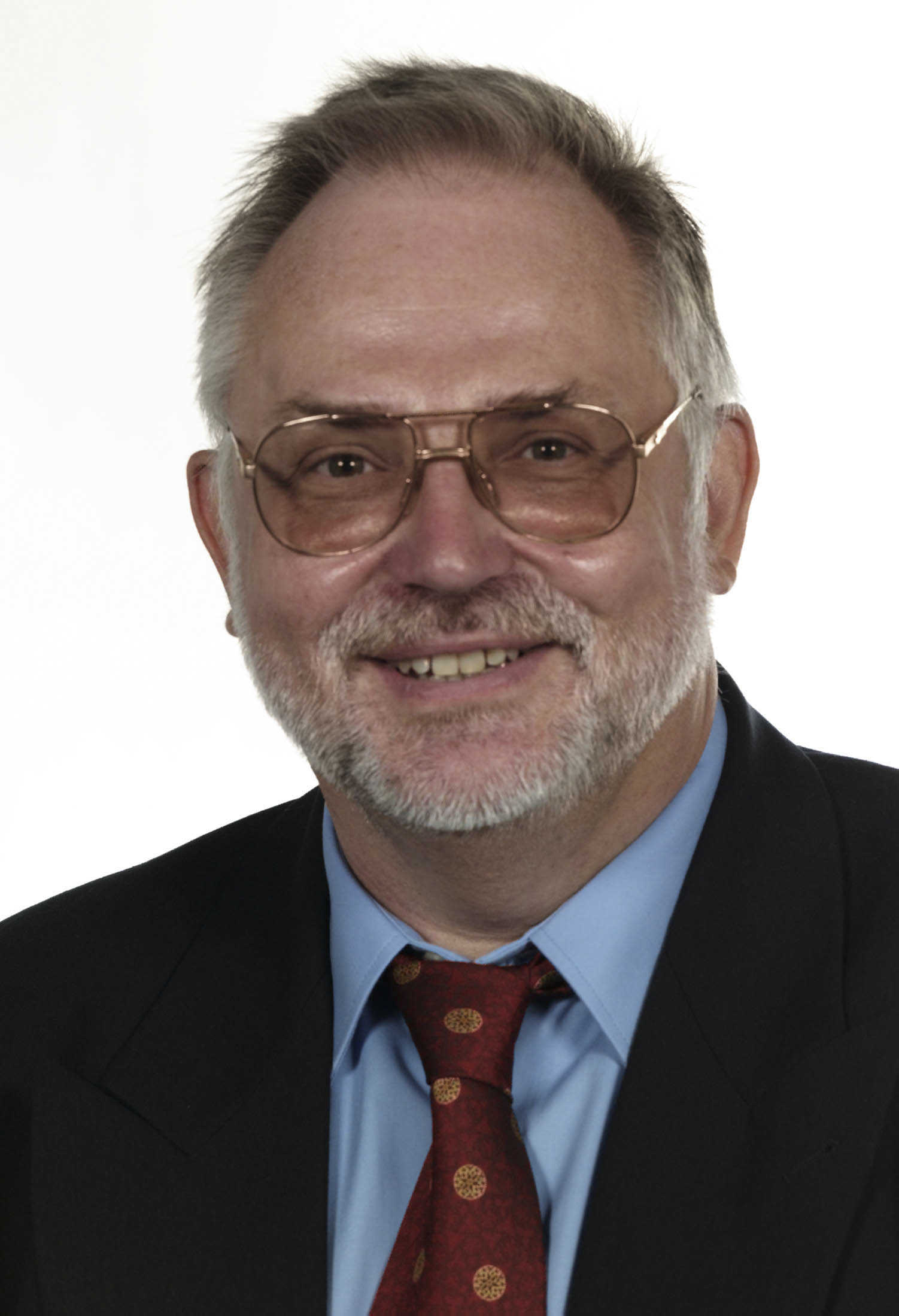
- Kuhne in 1999

Member of the European Parliament for Germany
- In office 19 July 1994 – 14 July 2009

Personal details
- Born: 6 September 1949 (age 75); Soest, North Rhine-Westphalia, West Germany
- Political party: SPD

Helmut Kuhne (born 6 September 1949) is a German politician who served as a Member of the European Parliament from 1994 until 2009. He is a member of the Social Democratic Party of Germany, part of the Socialist Group.

During his time in parliament, Kuhne sat on the European Parliament's Committee on Foreign Affairs. He was also a member of the delegation for relations with the United States.

== Education ==
- 1973: Graduate in sociology

== Career ==
- 1974-1994: Worked at Lippstadt Protestant Grammar School and in various adult education establishments, latterly as research assistant at the Regional Institute for School and Further Education, North Rhine-Westphalia, in Soest
- Since October 2000, taught intermittently at the Faculty for Social Sciences, Ruhr University, Bochum
- 1974-1978: Chairman of the Young Socialists, Western Westphalia district
- 1978-2000: Member of the Western Westphalia SPD District Executive
- 1984-1994: Member of Soest District Council
- 1991-1999: Member of the WDR Broadcasting Council

== See also ==
- 2004 European Parliament election in Germany
