= Karin Junker =

German politician and author

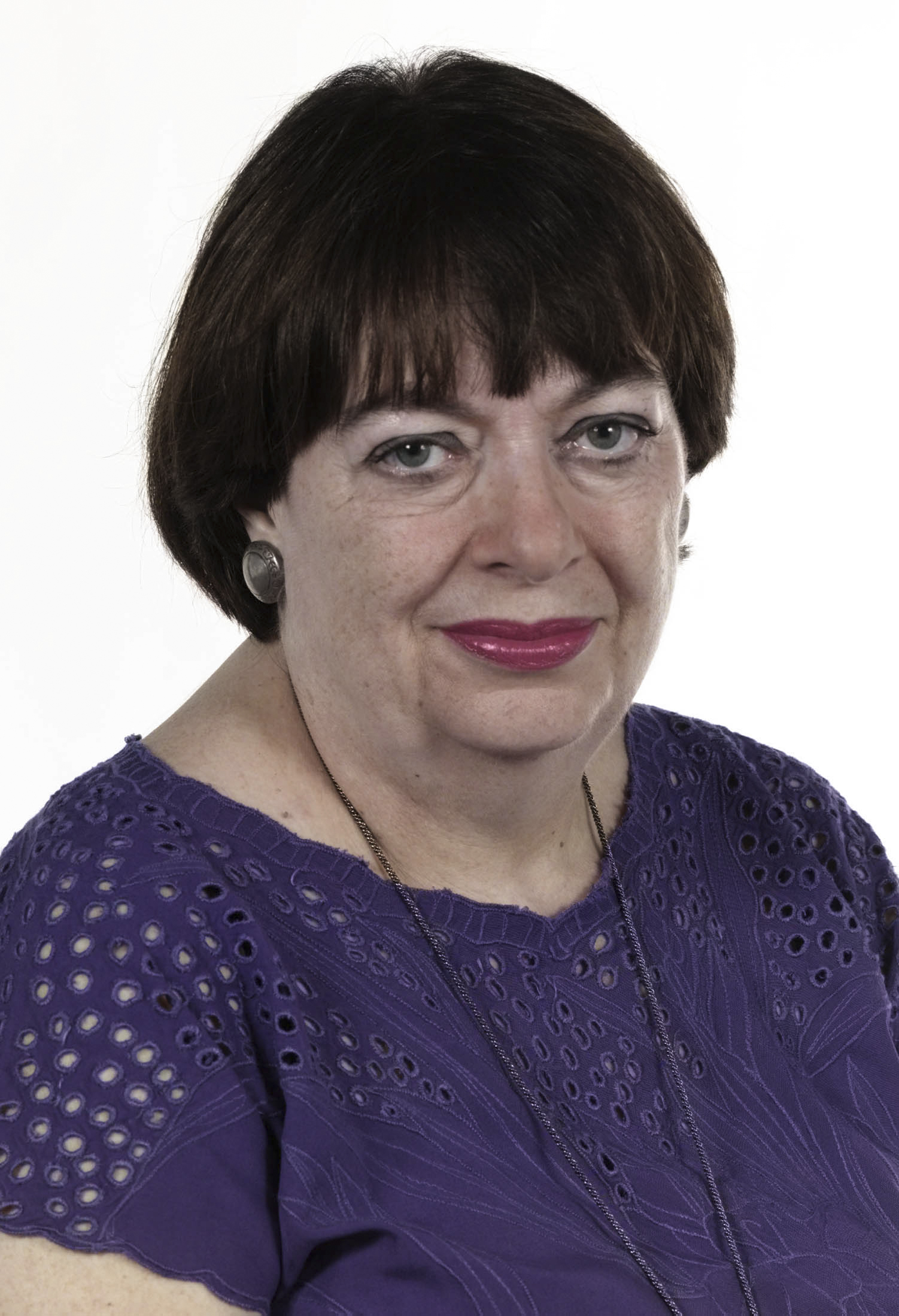
- Junker in 1999

Member of the European Parliament for Germany
- In office 1989 – 20 July 2004

Personal details
- Born: 24 December 1940; Düsseldorf, Nazi Germany
- Political party: Social Democratic Party of Germany
- Occupation: Politician, author

Karin Renate Junker (born 24 December 1940) is a German politician and author. She was a Member of the European Parliament from 1989 to 2004, representing the Social Democratic Party of Germany (SPD).

== Life ==
Karin Junker was born on 24 December 1940, in Düsseldorf. She was politically active in the 1960s student movement, and became a journalist. In 1977 she unsuccessfully challenged Elfriede Hoffmann for the leadership of SPD's women's organization, the Arbeitsgemeinschaft Sozialdemokratischer Frauen (ASF).

She entered the European Parliament in 1989. In 1992 she succeeded Inge Wettig-Danielmeier as chair of the ASF.

Papers relating to Junker are held at the Archives of Social Democracy at the Library of the Friedrich Ebert Foundation in Bonn.

== Works ==
- Frauen und Bildung [Women and Education]. Bonn: Ministry of Education, Science and Research, 1976?
- Das Ausbildungsplatzförderungsgesetz [The Training Place Promotion Act]. Bonn: Ministry of Education, Science and Research, 1977?
- Kinder [Children]. Bonn: Press and Information Office of the Federal Government of Germany, 1979
- Selbstbewusst, Selbstbestimmt: Frauen in Europa [Self-assured, Self-determined: Women in Europe]. Bonn, 1994
