= Annemarie Kuhn =

German politician (1937–2025)

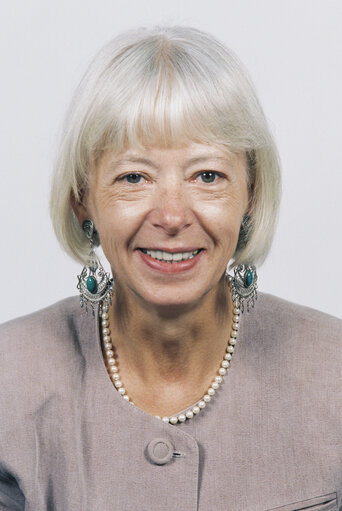
- Kuhn in 2012

Member of the European Parliament for Germany
- In office 22 December 1990 – 19 July 1999

Personal details
- Born: 9 May 1937 Ludwigshafen, Gau Saar-Palatinate, Germany
- Died: 10 December 2025 (aged 88)
- Party: SPD
- Occupation: Banker

Annemarie Kuhn (9 May 1937 – 10 December 2025) was a German politician of the Social Democratic Party (SPD).

Kuhn served as a member of the European Parliament from 1990 to 1999.

Kuhn died on 10 December 2025 at the age of 88.
