= Karin Jöns =

German politician

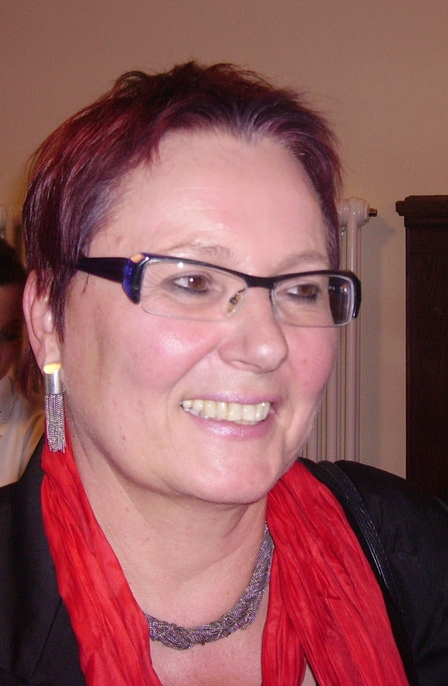
Karin Jöns.

Karin Jöns (born 29 April 1953 in Kiel) is a German politician and former Member of the European Parliament with the Social Democratic Party of Germany. During her time in parliament she was part of the Socialist Group and was on the European Parliament's Committee on Employment and Social Affairs.

She was a substitute for the Committee on Women's Rights and Gender Equality and the Committee on the Environment, Public Health and Food Safety. She also was a member of the Delegation to the EU-Kazakhstan, EU-Kyrgyzstan and EU-Uzbekistan Parliamentary Cooperation Committees, and for relations with Tajikistan, Turkmenistan and Mongolia.

== Education ==
- 1977: Graduate in political science and history
- 1980: Graduate in Slavonic studies

== Career ==
- 1976-1978: Freelance journalist
- 1978-1980: editor attached to the Central Executive Committee of the ÖTV (Public Service, Transport and Communications Workers' Union)
- 1981-1982: Press officer in Bonn of the Senator for Federal Affairs of the Free Hanseatic City of Bremen
- 1983-1986: head of the Bonn office of the Federal Republic's representative for cultural affairs under the Treaty on Franco-German Cooperation
- 1986-1987: International and European affairs officer in the state chancellery of North Rhine-Westphalia
- 1987-1994: organisation and management of Bremen's office in Brussels for liaison with the European Union
- since 1973: Member of the SPD
- since 1998: Member of Bremen SPD Land Executive Committee
- since 1994: Member of the European Parliament
- Member of the United Service Sector Union ver.di (formerly the ÖTV and IG Medien (media workers' union))
- Member of the Workers' Welfare Association (AWO)
- Member of Europa-Union Germany
- Member of Amnesty International and Refugio e.V
- Chairwoman of Nationales Forum Deutschland e.V
- since 2000: within Europa Donna, the European Breast Cancer Coalition

== See also ==
- 2004 European Parliament election in Germany
