= Jutta Haug =

German politician (born 1951)

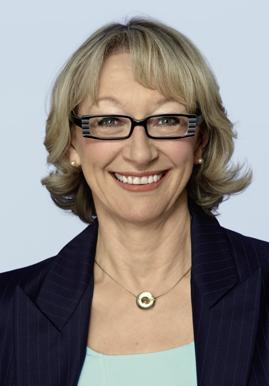
Jutta Haug, 2009

Jutta Dorothea Haug (born 8 October 1951 in Castrop-Rauxel) is a German politician who served as a Member of the European Parliament from 1994 until 2014. She is a member of the Social Democratic Party of Germany, part of the Socialist Group.

During her time in parliament, Haug sat on the European Parliament's Committee on Budgets. She was also a substitute for the Committee on the Environment, Public Health and Food Safety, substitute for the Delegation to the EU-Former Yugoslav Republic of Macedonia Joint Parliamentary Committee.

== Other activities ==
- District Chair of the Association of Social-Democratic Women, Western Westphalia
- Member of Executive Committee
- Former Municipal Councillor in Herten

== Career ==
- since 1994: Member of the European Parliament
- since 1999: Member of the SPD Executive (Social Democratic Party of Germany)

== See also ==
- 2004 European Parliament election in Germany
