= Hartmut Nassauer =

German politician (born 1942)

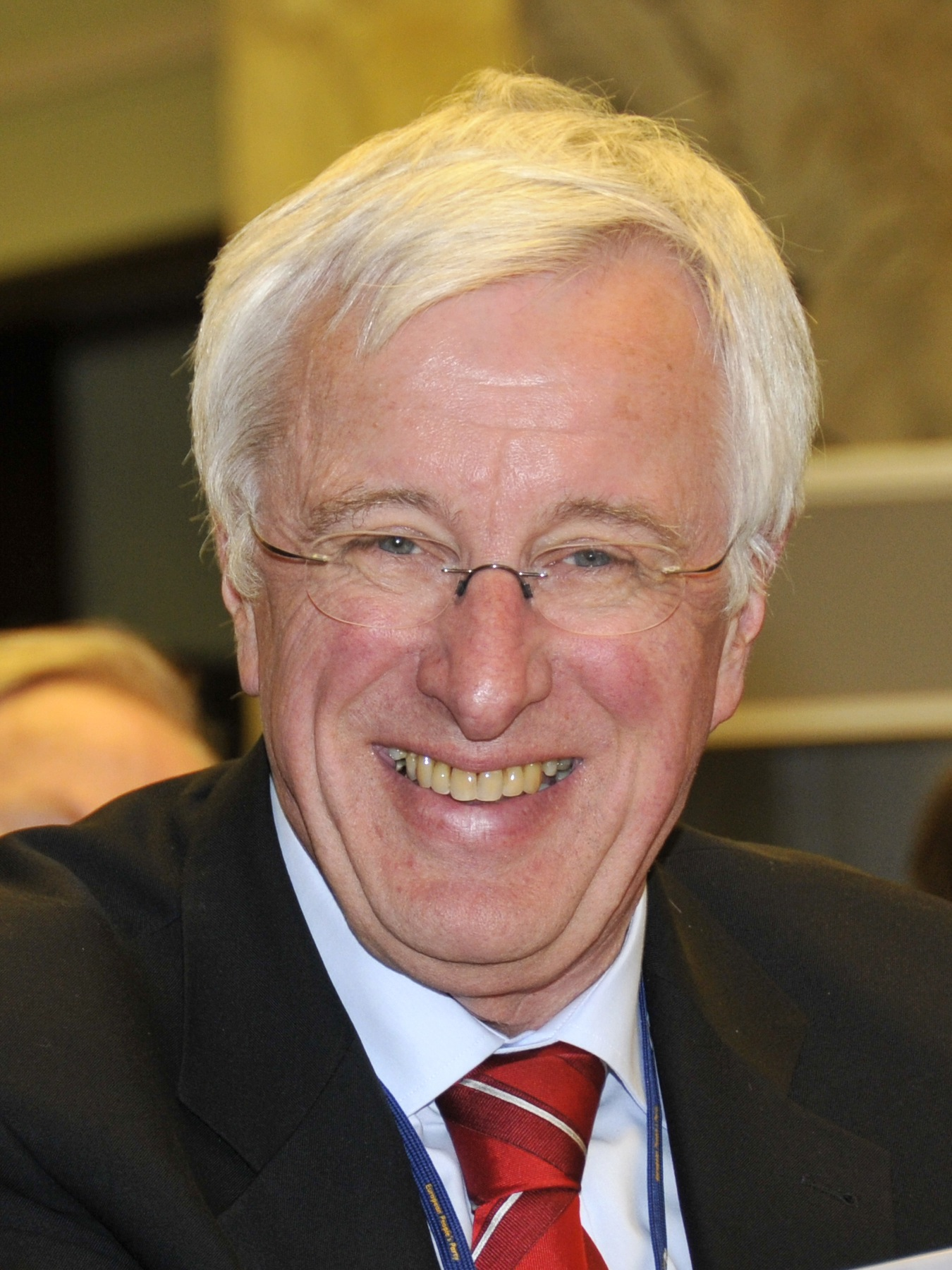
Hartmut Nassauer

Hartmut Nassauer (born 17 October 1942, in Marburg) is a German politician who served as a Member of the European Parliament for Hesse from 1994 until 2009. He is a member of the conservative Christian Democratic Union, part of the European People's Party.
