= Dieter-Lebrecht Koch =

German politician (born 1953)

Dieter-Lebrecht Koch MEP
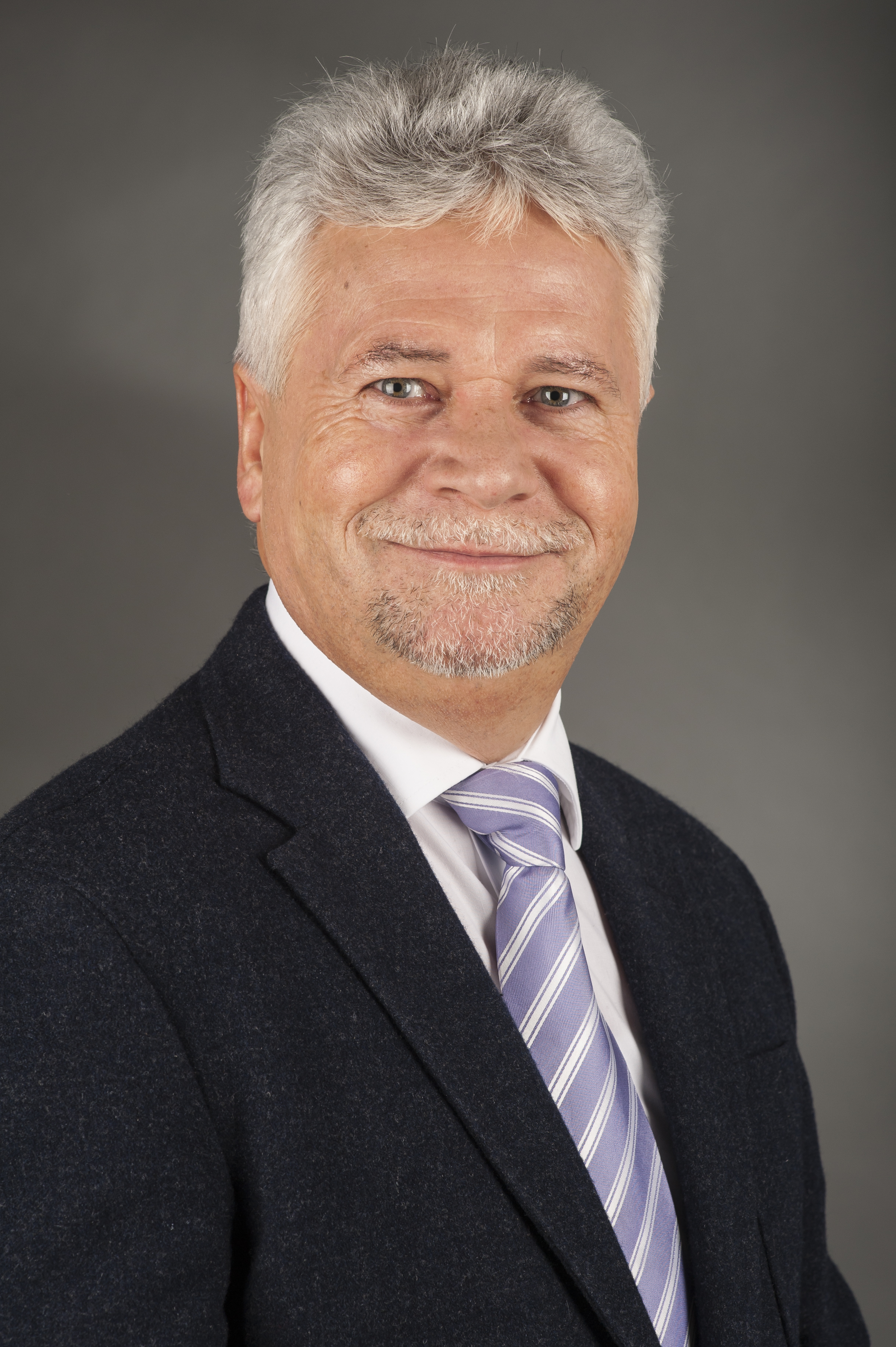

Member of the European Parliament
- In office 1 July 1994 – 1 July 2019
- Constituency: Germany

Personal details
- Born: 7 January 1953 (age 73) Weissenfels, Germany
- Party: German; Christian Democratic Union; EU; European People's Party
- Spouse: Maria Hezlich
- Children: 2
- Education: Bauhaus University, Weimar
- Website: www.dieter-l-koch.de

Dieter-Lebrecht Koch (born 7 January 1953) is a German politician who served as a Member of the European Parliament (MEP) from 1994 until 2019. He is a member of the Christian Democratic Union, part of the European People's Party.

== See also ==
- Front brake light
