= Elisabeth Schroedter =

German politician (born 1959)

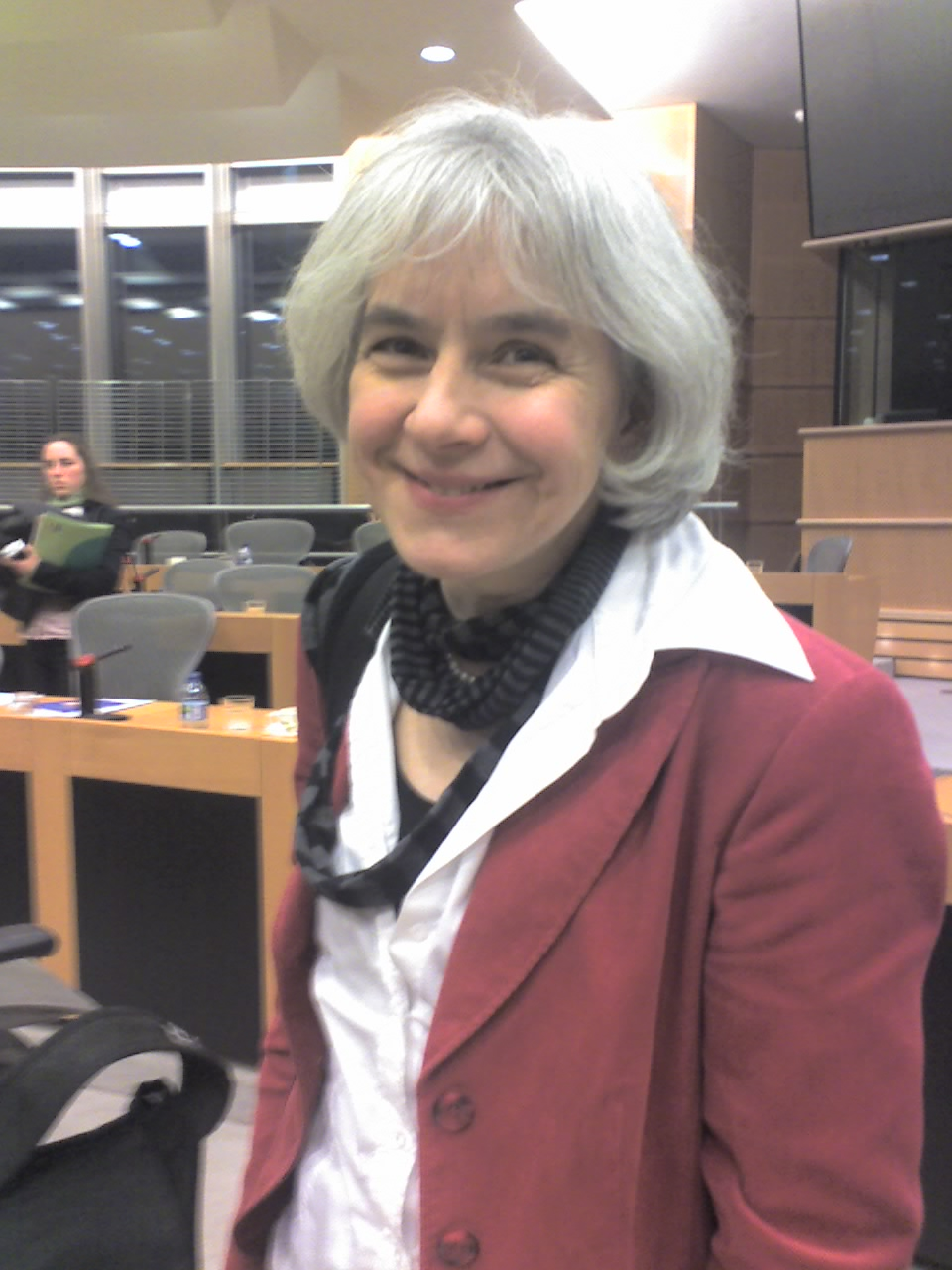
Schroedter in 2008

Elisabeth Schroedter (born 11 March 1959 in Dresden) is a German politician who served as a Member of the European Parliament in the Alliance '90/The Greens from 1994 to 2014.

== Political career ==
In parliament, Schroedter served as vice-chairwoman of the Committee on Employment and Social Affairs. She was also a member of the Committee on Regional Development (1994–2007) and the Committee on Foreign Affairs (1999–2004).

== Personal life ==
Schroedter is married and has three sons.
