= Christoph Werner Konrad =

German politician (born 1957)

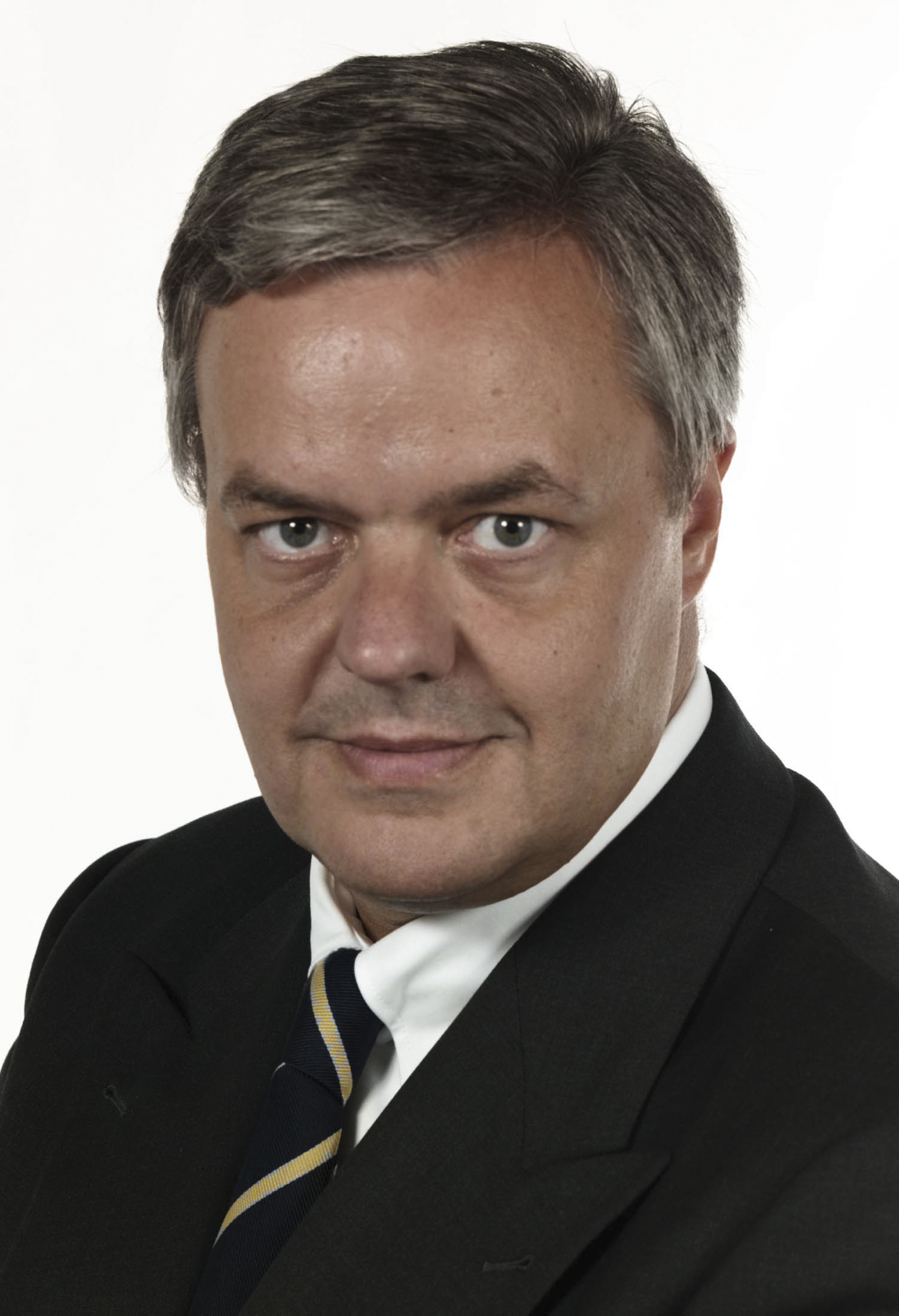
- Konrad in 1999

Member of the European Parliament
- In office 1994–2009

Personal details
- Born: 28 August 1957 (age 69) Bochum, North Rhine-Westphalia, West Germany
- Party: Christian Democratic Union
- Education: University of Bonn
- Profession: Political scientist

Christoph Werner Konrad (born 28 August 1957) is a German politician. He was a Member of the European Parliament for Germany from 1994 to 2009 and a member of the conservative Christian Democratic Union, part of the European People's Party.

Born in Bochum, North Rhine-Westphalia, Konrad attended the University of Bonn on a political science and legal studies major, earning his Ph.D. under supervision of Karl Dietrich Bracher in 1990.

After 15 years as a Member of the European Parliament, he worked as a freelance political consultant from 2009 onwards, alongside his lecturing activities. Among his numerous mandates is the chairmanship of the German section of the Luxembourg-based Mérite Européen Foundation. Since July 2011, he has been Managing Director of the German Association of the Automotive Industry (ZDK).
