= Erika Mann (politician) =

German politician

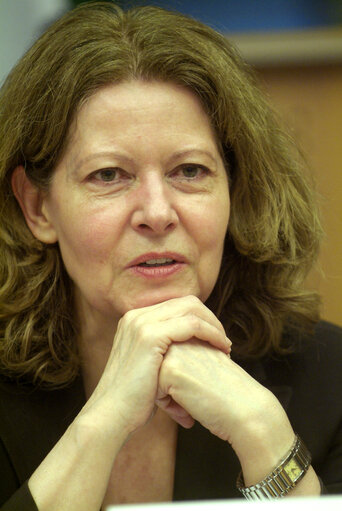
Erika Mann in 2007

Erika Mann (born 2 November 1950 in Leipzig, Germany) is a senior policy advisor at Covington based in Brussels.

She is a former Member of the European Parliament with the Social Democratic Party of Germany from 1994 to 2009. She was a member of the Party of European Socialists and sat on the Committee on International Trade of the European Parliament. She was a substitute for the Committee on Budgetary Control and the Committee on Industry, Research and Energy.

As a member of the European Parliament, she concentrated on trade policy, transatlantic relations, financial services, pharmaceuticals, digital economy, telecommunications and Internet-related legislation and research policy. She was the rapporteur for the eCommerce Directive.

After leaving public office, Mann was the executive vice president of the Computer & Communications Industry Association from 2009 until October 2011. She then led Facebook's office in Brussels, Belgium from late 2011 until December 2015.

She currently serves on the GNSO Council of ICANN.
