= Wilfried Telkämper =

German politician (born 1953)

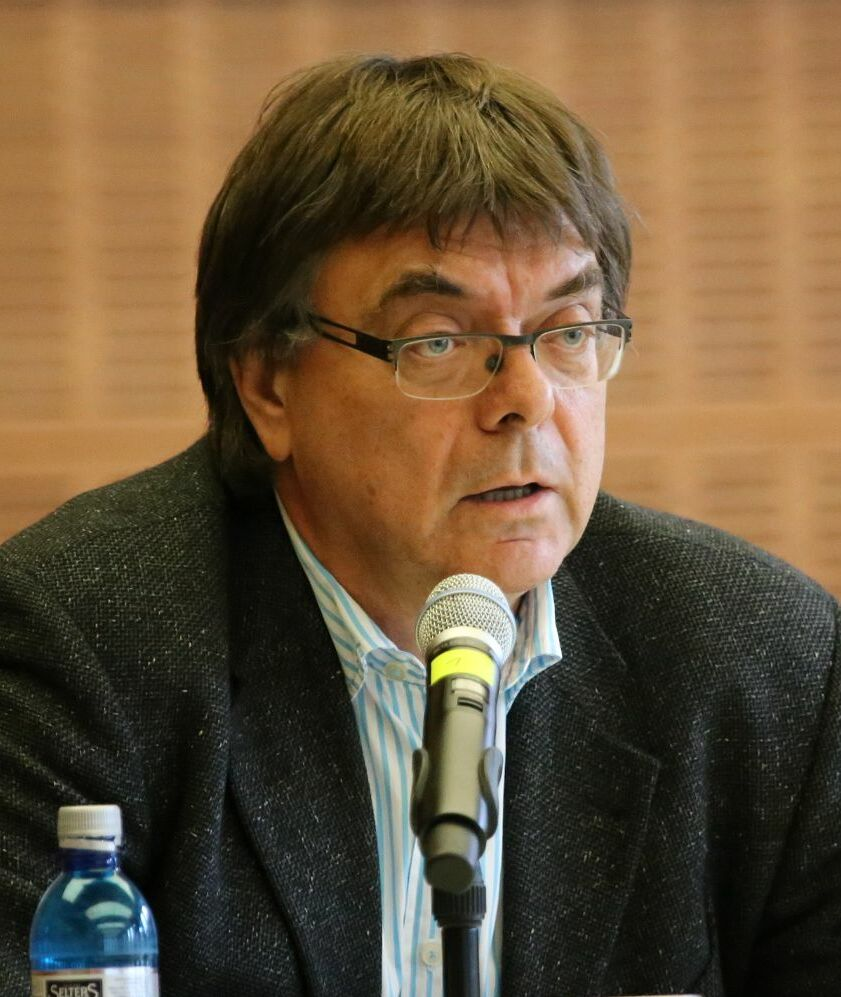
- Wilfried Telkämper (2014)
- Born: 16 January 1953 (age 73); Lingen-Ems, West Germany
- Occupation: Politician

Wilfried Telkämper (born 16 January 1953, in Lingen-Ems, West Germany.), became the new Director at the Centre for International Dialogue and Cooperation of Rosa Luxemburg Foundation on 1 July 2010.
