= Karl von Wogau =

German politician (born 1941)

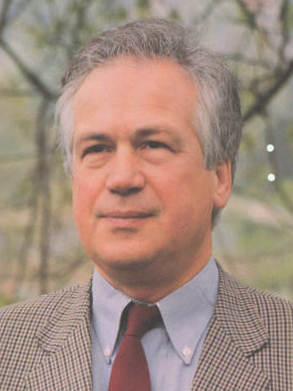
Karl von Wogau in 1989

Karl von Wogau (born 18 July 1941 in Freiburg) is a German politician. He studied law and economics in Freiburg, Munich and Bonn and holds a Doctorate on the constitutional history of Further Austria (German: Vorderösterreich).

Von Wogau is a member of the German conservative party Christian Democratic Union and the European People's Party. From 1979 to 2008, he served as an elected Member of the European Parliament for the Land (federal state) Baden-Württemberg and was the chairman of the Committee on Economic and Monetary Affairs from 1994 to 1999. From 2004 to 2009, he was chairman of the Subcommittee on Security and Defence of the Committee on Foreign Affairs.

In 2009, von Wogau was defeated in his bid for a seventh term in the European Parliament. He is now Secretary General of the European Security Foundation.
