= Norbert Glante =

German politician (born 1952)

Norbert Glante (born 8 August 1952, in Caputh) is a German politician who served as a Member of the European Parliament from 1994 until 2014. He is a member of the Social Democratic Party of Germany, part of the Socialist Group.

During his time in parliament, Glante sat on the European Parliament's Committee on the Environment, Public Health and Food Safety. He also served as a member for the Committee on Industry, Research and Energy, a member of the Delegation to the EU-Chile Joint Parliamentary Committee and a substitute for the Delegation for relations with Mercosur. He was the Parliament's rapporteur on the Galileo satellite navigation system and cogeneration.

== Career ==
- 1969-1972: Apprenticeship as electrical engineer, VEB Elektronische Bauelemente, Teltow
- 1973-1976: Test bench mechanic, VEB Elektronische Bauelemente, Teltow
- 1974-1976: Advanced school-leaving certificate, adult education institute
- 1976-1980: Studied automation technology in Leipzig
- 1980-1984: Design engineer, VEB Elektronische Bauelemente, Teltow
- 1984-1990: Computer scientist, Central Institute for Geophysics, Potsdam
- 1990-1994: Chairman of Potsdam district council
- 1994-2014: Member of the European Parliament

== Education ==
- Chairman of Brandenburg regional association of the Europa Union
- Member of the Europe House, Brandenburg
- Member of the German-Polish Society
- Member of the German War Graves Commission
- Member of the European Energy Foundation
- founder member of the European Internet Foundation
- 2010: Member of the policy steering committee, Potsdam City of Culture

== Decorations ==
- Bundesverdienstkreuz with ribbon

== See also ==
- 2004 European Parliament election in Germany
