= Georg Jarzembowski =

German politician (born 1947)

Georg Jarzembowski (born 3 February 1947) is a jurist and a former German and European Parliamentarian (CDU / European People’s Party). He lives with his wife in Hamburg and has one son.

== Education and early professional life ==
After his school time at the High School Martino-Katharineum in Braunschweig – with one year as an exchange student at the William Penn Charter School in Philadelphia – and his military service he studied law at the University of Hamburg from 1968 until 1973. He passed his First Juridical State Exam in 1973 and his Second Juridical State Exam in 1975. From 1975 until 1978 he wrote his doctorate thesis on German and American corporation law – receiving his PhD in 1980. In 1978 he became a judge at the District Court of Hamburg and in 1979 took on the role as a legal adviser at the State Justice Department of Hamburg, serving there until 1991.

== Political career ==
From 1979 until 1991 he served as a Member of the Parliament of the City-State of Hamburg. He was a Member of the Budget Committee and of the Committee für Port and Economic Affairs. He was the spokesman of the CDU-Group for Port Affairs. From 1991 until 2009 he served as a Member of the European Parliament. He was a Member and the Coordinator of the Group the European People's Party in the Transport Committee. He was a Member and the Chairman of the Delegation of the European Parliament for the Relation with Japan and the Chairman of the EP–Taiwan Friendship Group.

== Later career ==
Since his departure from the European Parliament he is active as an advisor on European Affairs and was also an attorney-at-law from July 2009 until May 2022. From 2010 until 2012 he additionally served as the Coordinator of the European Commission for the Functional Airspace Blocks System and from 2012 until 2013 as a Member of the Evaluation Panel on the European Aviation Safety Agency.
