= Bernd Posselt =

German politician (born 1956)

Member of the European Parliament
- In office 1994–2014
- Constituency: Germany

Personal details
- Born: June 4, 1956 (age 70) Pforzheim, Baden-Württemberg, West Germany
- Party: Christian Social Union in Bavaria
- Other political affiliations: European People's Party
- Occupation: Politician
- Known for: President of Paneuropa-Union Deutschland; leader of the Sudetendeutsche Landsmannschaft

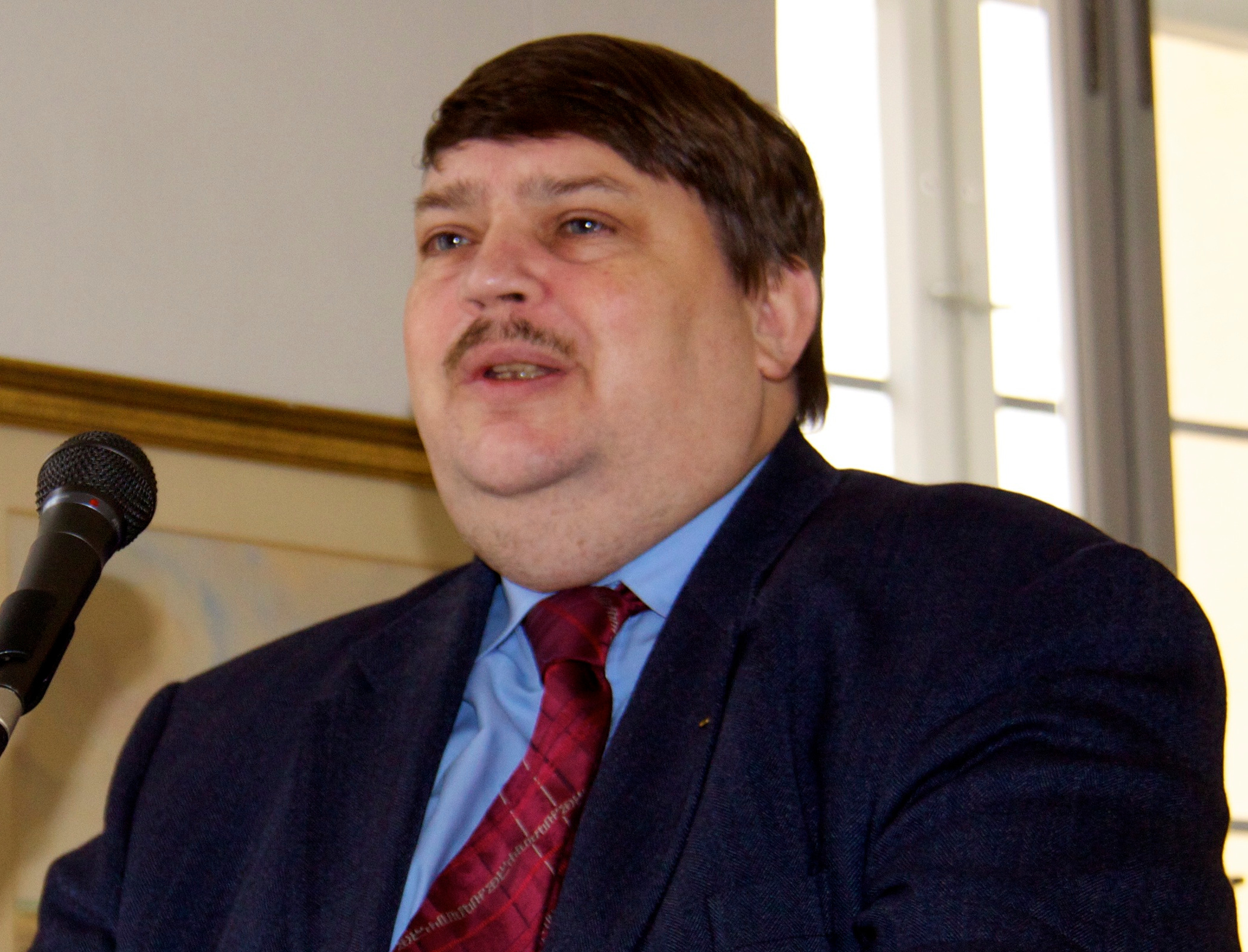
Bernd Posselt (2013)

Bernd Posselt (born 4 June 1956 in Pforzheim) is a German politician, who served as a Member of the European Parliament from 1994 to 2014, representing the Christian Social Union in Bavaria (CSU) and the European People's Party (EPP). He is currently a member of the executive board of the CSU.

== Personal and professional background ==
Posselt was born in Pforzheim, Baden-Württemberg as a son of expellees. He was a Member of the European Parliament from 1994 to 2014. In 1998 he became president of the Paneuropa-Union Deutschland, the German branch of the International Paneuropean Union.

== Political and community activities ==
Posselt is a German advocate of the rights of those Germans whose ancestors lived in the Sudetenland area of Bohemia as well as Moravia and who were expelled by the Potsdam Conference and the governments in Central and Eastern Europe after the Second World War. Since 2000, Posselt has been the Chair of the Sudetendeutsche Landsmannschaft, an organization representing Sudeten German expellees and refugees.
