= Wolfgang Kreissl-Dörfler =

German politician (born 1950)

Wolfgang Kreissl-Dörfler (born 1 December 1950 in Augsburg) is a German politician who served as a Member of the European Parliament from 1994 until 2014. He is a member of the Social Democratic Party of Germany, part of the Socialist Group.

During his time in parliament, Kreissl-Dörfler sat on the European Parliament's Committee on Foreign Affairs. He was also a substitute for the Committee on Civil Liberties, Justice and Home Affairs and a member of the Delegation for relations with the United States.

== Education ==
- Farmer and qualified social science teacher
- Civilian service at accident hospital in Murnau

== Career ==
- 1979-1985: Development aid worker with the German Development Service in Brazil
- 1986-1987: expert with the German World Hunger Relief Agency in Angola
- in Germany
- leader of a project for unemployed young people
- senior teacher at a rehabilitation centre for people with severe physical disabilities and respiratory problems
- leader of a public project working with children and young people
- 1994-2014: Member of the European Parliament
- Member of North-South Forum, Munich
- Member of WEED (World Economy, Ecology and Development)
- Member of Europa Union
- Member of AbL, e.V (German Small Farmers' Association)
- 1992: UN election observer in Angola
- 2000: election observer in Mexico
- 2001: Head of Mission/ Chief European Union Observer for elections in East Timor
- 2002: honorary citizen of the City of Massapé, north-east Brazil
