= Hiltrud Breyer =

German politician (born 1957)

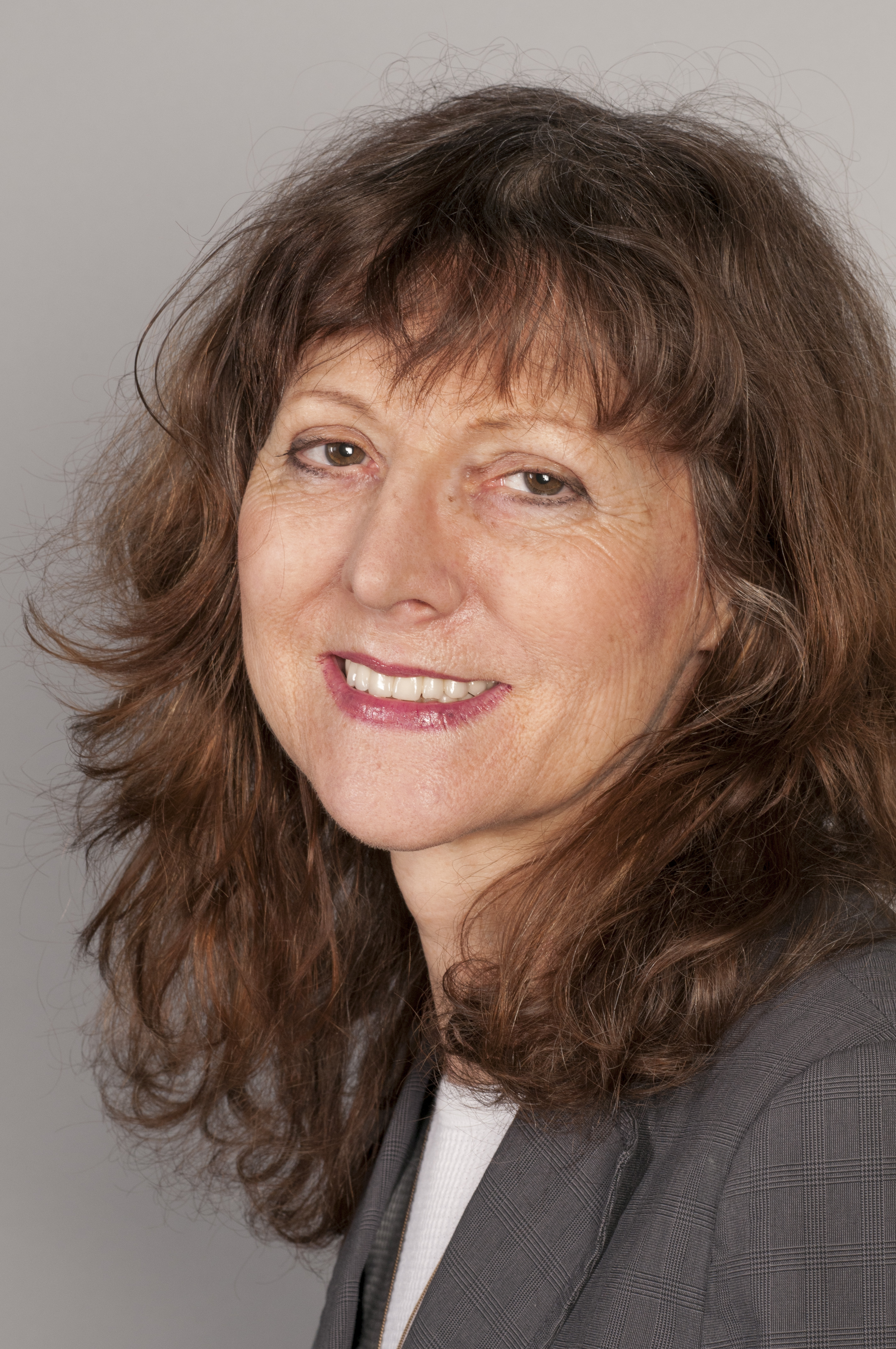
- Hiltrud Breyer in 2014

Member of the European Parliament
- In office 1989–2009

Personal details
- Born: 22 August 1957 (age 69) Saarbrücken, West Germany
- Party: Alliance '90/The Greens
- Education: Saarland University
- Profession: Political scientist

Hiltrud Breyer (born 22 August 1957) is a German politician and former Member of the European Parliament with the German Green Party, part of the European Greens and sits on the European Parliament's Committee on Women's Rights and Gender Equality and its Committee on the Environment, Public Health and Food Safety.

She is a substitute for the Committee on Legal Affairs, substitute for the Delegation to the EU-Romania Joint Parliamentary Committee.

== Education ==
- Studied political science in Saarbrücken and Berlin
- Founding member of the Greens
- posts include Regional Executive Spokeswoman for the Greens in Saarland
- Former Member of the Mandelbachtal Municipal Council

== Career ==
- 1989–2009: Member of the European Parliament
- Founding member of 'Gen-ethisches Netzwerk' (genetic ethics network)

== Controversy ==
In 2008, German television station RTL reported about members of the European Parliament—including Breyer—who signed the attendance register on Friday mornings to receive the EP's daily allowance of 284 Euro before leaving Strasbourg immediately for the weekend. Breyer later denied these allegations.

== See also ==
- 2004 European Parliament election in Germany
