= Anne-Karin Glase =

German politician (born 1954)

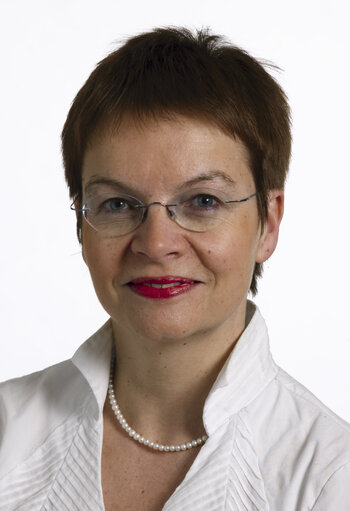

Member of the European Parliament
- In office 11 March 1991 – 19 July 2004
- Parliamentary group: European People's Party Group
- Constituency: Germany

Member of the Volkskammer
- In office 18 March 1990 – 2 October 1990
- Constituency: Potsdam

Personal details
- Born: 24 July 1954 (age 71) Neuruppin, Brandenburg, East Germany
- Party: Christian Democratic Union of Germany

Anne-Karin Glase (born 24 July 1954) is a German former Christian Democratic Union of Germany politician who has served three terms as a Member of the European Parliament (MEP) for the Germany constituency for the European People's Party Group (Christian Democratic Group) from March 1991 to July 2004. She had previously represented the Potsdam constituency as a member of the East German parliament Volkskammer between March 1990 and October 1990. Glase was on various committees such as the Committee on Employment and Social Affairs and the Committee on Budgets during the period she was an MEP.

== Biography ==
Glase was born in Neuruppin, Brandenburg, East Germany, on 24 July 1954. She is a member of the Evangelical Church in Germany, and has been a member of the Christian Democratic Union of Germany (CDU) since 1986. Glase is married with two children and trained as a paediatric nurse and as a welfare worker. She was educated at Neuruppin's Polytechnic Secondary School. Until 1990, she worked as a carer for people who had skin and sexual illnesses before she was elected to the Volkskammer serving the Potsdam constituency between 18 March 1990 and 2 October 1990. Glase was deputy chairperson of the Brandenburg Women's Union and was on the Federal Board of Directors of the Women's Union. She was chairperson of the Committee on Economic Cooperation and Development.

On 11 March 1991, Glase became a Member of the European Parliament (MEP) for the European Parliament for the constituency of Germany on behalf of the European People's Party Group (Christian Democratic Group) of which she was an observer. She was twice an observer on the Committee on Development and Cooperation and for the Delegation for Relations with the countries of South America on four occasions. Glase was a substitute observer on the Committee on Women's Rights. She had become a full member of the European People's Party Group by the time she was elected to the Fourth European Parliament the 1994 European Parliament election in Germany on 19 July 1994. Glase served on the Committee on Employment and Social Affairs, the Committee on Women's Rights, the Delegation for relations with the countries of Central America and Mexico (twice) and the Members from the European Parliament to the Joint Assembly of the Agreement between the African, Caribbean and Pacific States and the European Union (ACP-EU) (twice).

She was a substitute for each of the Committee on Development and Cooperation and the Committee on Economic and Monetary Affairs and Industrial Policy (both twice), the Delegation for relations with Canada (three times) and the Committee on Women's Rights. Glase was re-elected to the Fifth European Parliament at the 1999 European Parliament election in Germany on 20 July 1999. From 20 July 1999 to 14 January 2002 and again between 17 January 2002 and 19 July 2004, she served as a member of the Committee on Employment and Social Affairs and the Members from the European Parliament to the Joint Parliamentary Assembly of the Agreement between the African, Caribbean and Pacific States and the European Union (ACP-EU). Glase was a substitute on the Committee on Development and Cooperation between 20 July 1999 and 14 January 2002 and then on the Committee on Budgets from 17 January 2002 to 19 July 2004. She has served as chairperson of Association of Competence Center for Conversion / Ordnance Clearance e.V. since 2000 and is on the CDU's federal executive board.
