= Ozan Ceyhun =

Ozan Ceyhun (born October 10, 1960, in Adana, Turkey) is a politician and diplomat of Turkish origin who has worked partly in Germany and partly in Turkey. He was first a member of the Green Party (Alliance 90/The Greens), then a Member of the European Parliament (SPD), a member of the Committee on Civil Liberties, Justice and Home Affairs (Democratic Affairs), coordinator of the SPD group for the Committee on Civil Liberties, Justice and Home Affairs, substitute member of the Committee on Budgets, and member of the EU-Turkey Joint Parliamentary Delegation. He worked at the Representation of the State of Hesse to the European Union before moving into the private sector.Ceyhun worked as an advisor for the AKP and in February 2020 he was appointed Turkish Ambassador to Austria.

== Career ==
Ceyhun's father is the Turkish writer Ceyhun Demirtaş.

Ceyhun grew up in Istanbul and graduated from the Bosphorus Gymnasium in 1979. He then studied German philology at Hacettepe University in Ankara until the 1980 military coup. In January 1981, he emigrated to Austria, and in October 1982 to Germany, where he completed training as a state-certified educator. He became known, among other things, for his switch to the SPD in 2000, after having been a member of the Green Party (Alliance 90/The Greens) from 1986 to 2000, where he worked as an expert on migration and asylum policy for the Green Party's parliamentary group in the Bundestag from 1990 to 1992. From 1992 to 1998, he worked first as a consultant and later as head of department in the Hessian Ministry for the Environment and Family Affairs. From 1993 to 2000, he was a member of the district council of the Groß-Gerau district.

In 1996, while working for the Hessian Ministry for Family Affairs, Ceyhun published a Turkish-language book, "Almanya'da bir Türk" ("A Turk in Germany"), in which he compared accommodations for asylum seekers to concentration camps. Hesse's Minister for the Environment and Family Affairs, Margarethe Nimsch (Alliance 90/The Greens), immediately distanced herself from her employee Ozan Ceyhun, who subsequently apologized "in the strongest possible terms," according to the ministry. Ceyhun promised to halt "further publication of the book until a thorough revision." The minister nevertheless removed her fellow party member from his post and assigned him a new role in the youth welfare department.

Ceyhun had been Vice-Chair of the Intercultural Council in Germany since 1997. From 1998 to 2000, he was a Member of the European Parliament for the Greens, and from 2000 to 2004 for the SPD. In 2000, a publication on Islamism in Europe, titled "Politics in the Name of Allah: Islamism – A Challenge for Europe," was published under the title "Politics in the Name of Allah: Islamism – A Challenge for Europe." It was edited by Ozan Ceyhun and written by Eberhard Seidel, Claudia Dantschke, and Ali Yıldırım.

Furthermore, Ceyhun worked as an advisor for the Turkish party AKP, including for the former Minister for European Affairs, Egemen Bağış. He ran for the AKP in the June 2015 Turkish parliamentary elections in a constituency in Izmir. He criticized the leader of the Green Party, Cem Özdemir, on Turkish television and called the German Federal President Joachim Gauck a "toy" because of his controversial speech in Turkey, accusing him of "cheap heroism" (ucuz kahramanlık) with his criticism of Erdoğan.

Ozan Ceyhun commented on the situation of Fethullah Gülen's followers in Germany, Cyprus, and Belgium in a tweet. He predicted many sleepless nights for them due to political tensions following the attempted coup in Turkey in 2016 and described this as a debt owed to the martyrs.

== Publications ==
- Ozan Ceyhun (with Kathrin Nord): You Never Become German. Rowohlt, Reinbek near Hamburg 2012, ISBN 978-3-499-62819-1.
- Ozan Ceyhun (ed.): Politics in the Name of Allah. Islamism – A Challenge for Europe. By Eberhard Seidel; Claudia Dantschke; Ali Yildirim; published by the Greens in the European Parliament, Brussels, 2000
