= Winfried Menrad =

German politician (1939 – 2016)

Winfried Menrad (10 February 1939 – 26 August 2016) was a German politician. A member of the Christian Democratic Union, Menrad served in the European Parliament from 1989 to 2004.
