= Thomas Mann (German politician) =

German CDU politician and MEP (born 1946)

Member of the European Parliament
- In office 1994–2019

Personal details
- Born: January 28, 1946 (age 80) Naumburg, Germany
- Party: Christian Democratic Union (CDU)

Thomas Mann (born 28 January 1946) is a German Christian Democratic Union (CDU) politician who served as a Member of the European Parliament (MEP) from 1994 to 2019, representing Hesse. During his 25 years in the European Parliament, he sat in the European People's Party (EPP) Group and focused principally on employment and social policy and on Tibetan human rights. He served as President of the European Parliament's Tibet Intergroup for 20 consecutive years, from 1999 to 2019.

== Early life and career ==
Mann was born on 28 January 1946 in Naumburg, Germany, and later settled in Schwalbach am Taunus in the Main-Taunus district of Hesse. After passing his Abitur in 1964, he trained as an Industriekaufmann (industrial merchant) and subsequently worked for roughly two decades in advertising and marketing agencies in Frankfurt, rising to the position of creative director. He left the private sector in 1988 to concentrate on politics.

== Political career ==
=== Early CDU activities ===
Mann became active in CDU politics from an early age. He served on the national council of the Junge Union, the CDU's youth organisation, and was Federal Chairman of the Junge Arbeitnehmerschaft (JA) — the workers' wing of the CDU youth movement — from 1975 to 1979. He was a member of the federal executive board of the Christlich-Demokratische Arbeitnehmerschaft (CDA), the Christian Democratic Workers' Association, from 1975 to 1985, and was a co-founder of the European Union of Christian Democratic Workers (EUCDW). He represented the CDU on the municipal council of Schwalbach am Taunus from 1985 to 1998.

=== European Parliament (1994–2019) ===
Mann was first elected to the European Parliament in 1994, representing Hesse for the CDU. He was returned at every subsequent election and served continuously for five full terms until 2019, a span of 25 years.

==== Employment and social policy ====
Mann sat on the Committee on Employment and Social Affairs throughout his parliamentary career. He served as Vice-Chair of that committee for three consecutive periods from 2004 to 2014. From 1994 onwards he was also a member of the Delegation for relations with South Asian countries and SAARC, serving as Vice-Chair of that delegation throughout his first four terms.

He was rapporteur for the European Credit System for Vocational Education and Training (ECVET) and the European Qualifications Framework (EQF), two instruments designed to facilitate the recognition and transfer of vocational qualifications across EU member states.

In October 2010, the Parliament adopted Mann's report on the demographic challenge and intergenerational solidarity (A7-0268/2010) by 440 votes to 122. The report proposed a European Youth Guarantee — guaranteeing a job or training placement within four months of a young person becoming unemployed — and a "Fifty-Plus Employment Pact" targeting a 55 per cent employment rate for workers aged over 50. It also addressed pension sustainability, the gender pay gap, childcare provision, and the emerging "silver economy".

During the eighth parliamentary term (2014–2019), Mann served as co-rapporteur, alongside Svetoslav Hristov Malinov (EPP, Bulgaria), for the revision of the Europass framework in the Committee on Employment and Social Affairs. A provisional agreement with the Council was reached on 13 December 2017, and the revised regulation entered into force on 8 May 2018, creating a new web-based platform for EU skills, qualifications, and learning opportunities.

==== Tibet Intergroup ====
Mann was elected President of the European Parliament's Tibet Intergroup in 1999 and held that position continuously until his retirement from Parliament in 2019, a tenure of 20 years. The International Campaign for Tibet described him as "the face of Tibet" within the European Parliament for two decades.

In 2003, when German Chancellor Gerhard Schröder raised the possibility of lifting the EU arms embargo on China, Mann publicly opposed the proposal, stating that it would falsely imply that human rights conditions in China had improved and that such a step was incompatible with the Parliament's commitment to fundamental rights.

In February 2014, at the Tibet Intergroup's 100th meeting, co-hosted with the International Campaign for Tibet in Brussels, Mann read a personal message from the 14th Dalai Lama to the assembled parliamentarians.

In May 2018, Mann led a European Parliament delegation to Dharamshala, India, where the group met with Tibetan President Lobsang Sangay, members of the Central Tibetan Administration, and the Dalai Lama. Mann called on China to resume dialogue with Tibetan representatives and expressed support for the Middle Way Approach.

On leaving Parliament in 2019, Mann stated: "It has been a great honour and privilege to serve the Tibetan people and the Middle Way vision of His Holiness the Dalai Lama for so many years ... the [Tibet Intergroup] has been at the front line of the battle for human rights and justice in Tibet, keeping the issue on the agenda of the European Parliament and other EU institutions."

=== Other activities ===
Outside the European Parliament, Mann was active in European federalist organisations. He has served as chairman of the Main-Taunus district branch of Europa-Union Deutschland since 1995, as state chairman of the Hesse branch since 1998, and as Deputy Federal Chairman of Europa-Union Deutschland since 2003. He served on the executive board of the Union of European Federalists from 2004 to 2006. Since 2004 he has been a member of the Broadcasting Council of Hessischer Rundfunk, Hesse's public broadcasting corporation.

== Recognition ==
In 2002, Mann received the Order of Merit of the Federal Republic of Germany in recognition of his commitment to human rights and social policy.
