= Ulrich Stockmann =

German politician (born 1951)

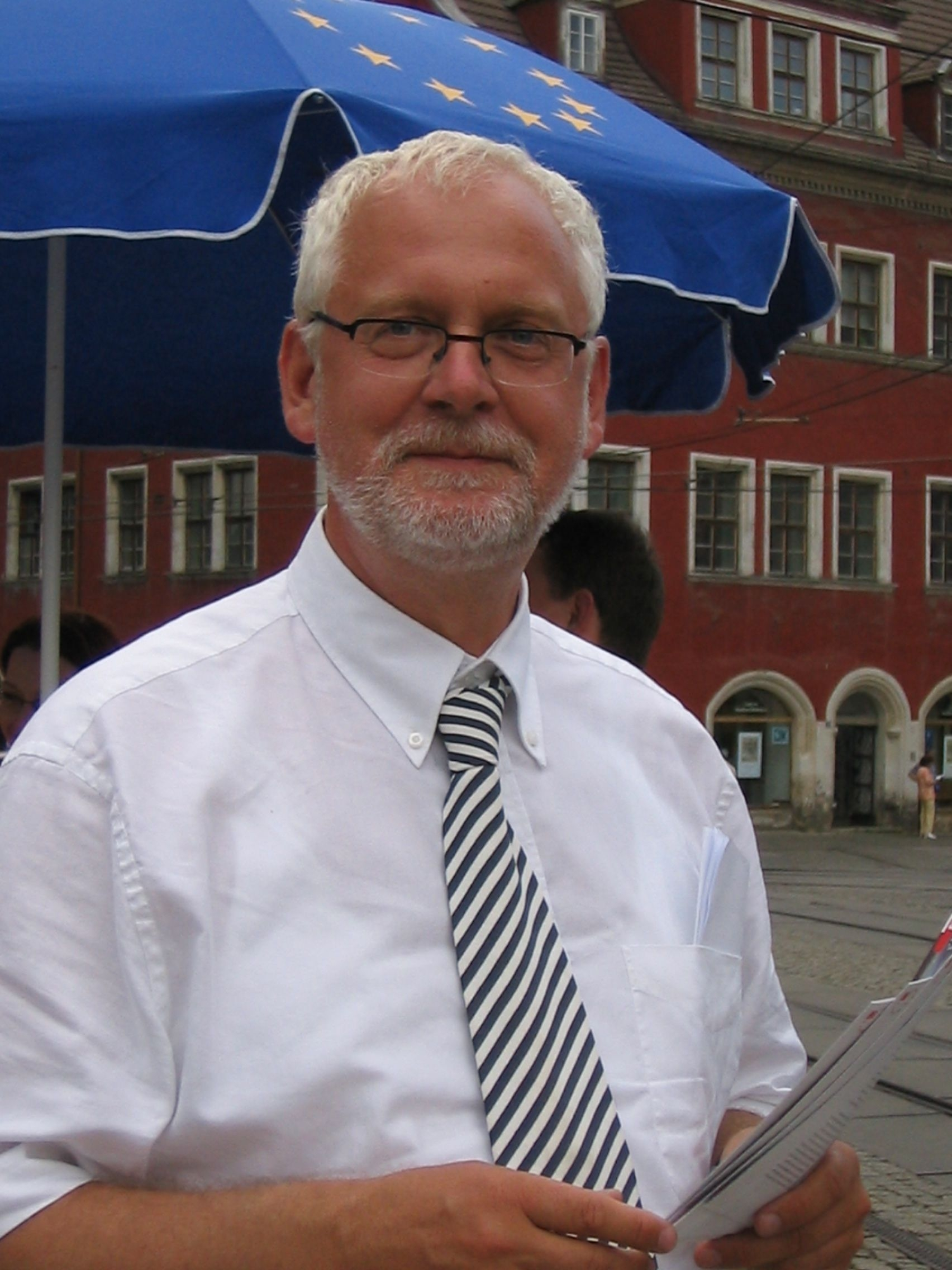
Ulrich Stockmann campaigning for European Parliament Elections 2004 in Halle, Saxony-Anhalt

Ulrich Stockmann (born 1 January 1951 in Oebisfelde) is a German politician who served as a Member of the European Parliament from 1994 until 2009. He is a member of the Social Democratic Party of Germany, part of the Socialist Group.

In parliament, Stockmann served on the Committee on Transport and Tourism. He was also a substitute for the Committee on the Environment, Public Health and Food Safety, a member of the Delegation for relations with Israel and a substitute for the Delegation to the EU-Chile Joint Parliamentary Committee.

== Career ==
- 1969-1973: Studied architecture and construction

== Education ==
- 1973: graduated in regional and urban planning
- 1982: First theological examination
- 1985: second theological examination
- 1988: ordained in
- 1973-1975: Research assistant, Academy for Industrial and General Building Development
- Senior Architect's Office, Berlin
- 1975-1976: studied in Berlin-Weißensee and Adlershof
- 1976-1982: Studied theology at Naumburg and Berlin
- 1982-1988: Worked with young people in Community for the Resurrection
- 1988-1990: Chaplain to young people and students in Naumburg
- Chairman of the Naumburg SPD Local and District Association
- 1994: Member of the Saxony-Anhalt SPD Association Executive Committee
- 1990: Vice-Chairman of the SPD Group in the Volkskammer
- since 1994: Member of the European Parliament
- 1994-1999: Vice-Chairman of the European Parliament Israel Delegation

== Decorations ==
- 1998: Order of Merit with ribbon, Federal Republic of Germany
