= Jürgen Schröder (politician) =

German politician (born 1940)

Jürgen Schröder (born 15 September 1940, Magdeburg) is a German politician who served as a Member of the European Parliament from 1994 until 2009, representing Saxony. He is a member of the conservative Christian Democratic Union, part of the European People's Party.
