= Gerhard Botz =

German politician (born 1955)

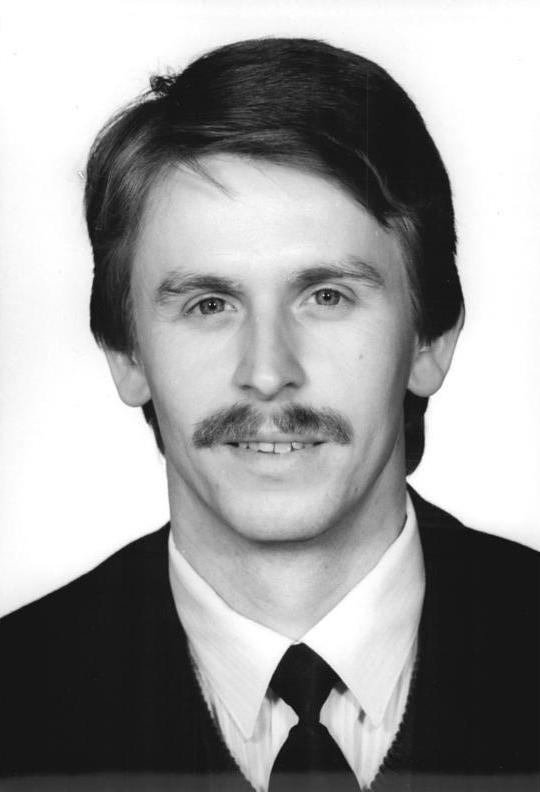
Botz in 1990

Gerhard Botz (born 15 September 1955 in Rudolstadt, Bezirk Gera) is a German politician and member of the SPD.
