= Lutz Goepel =

German politician (1942–2026)

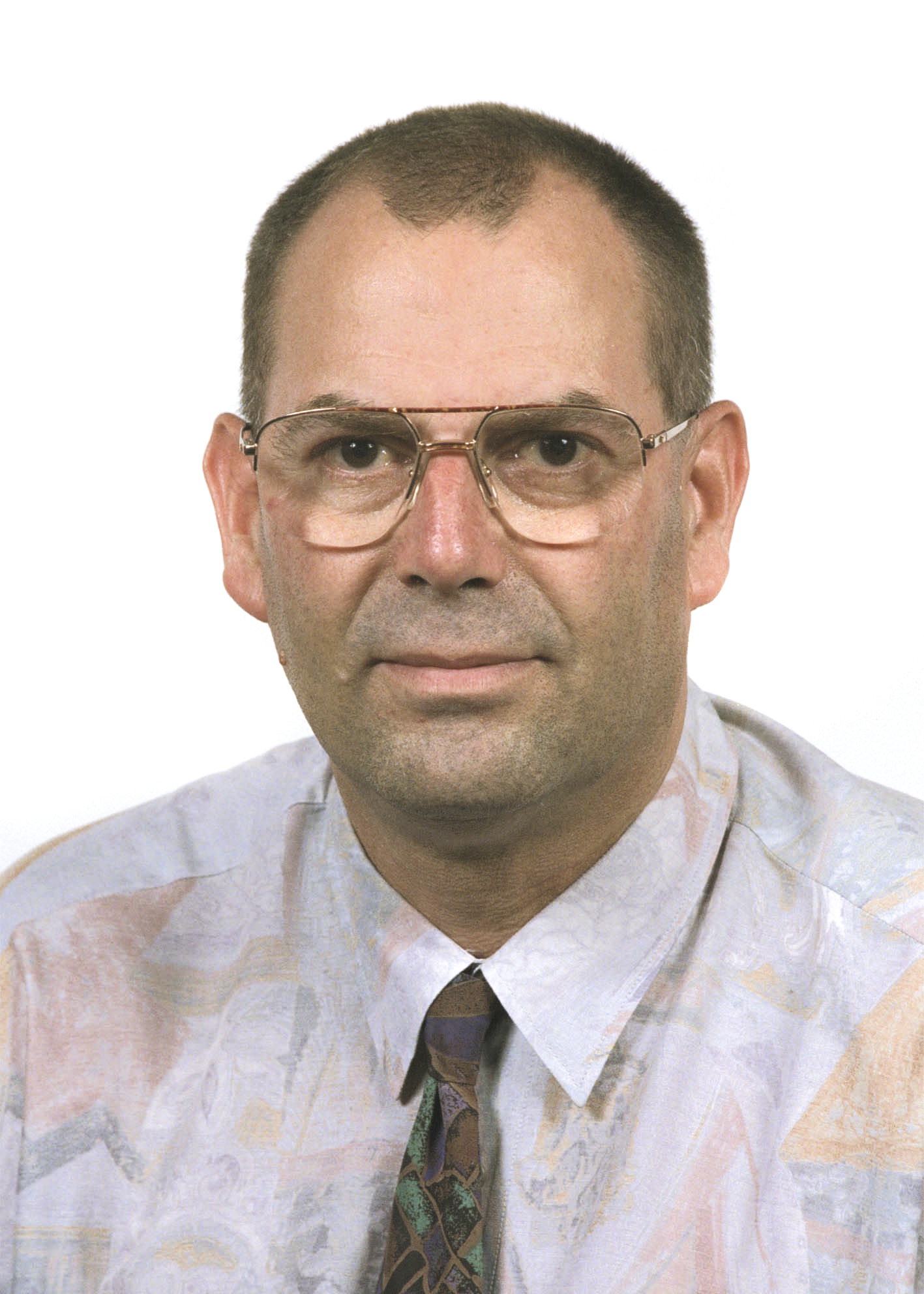
Goepel in 1994

Lutz Goepel (10 October 1942 – 29 April 2026) was a German politician, who served as a Member of the European Parliament from 1994 until 2009, representing Saxony.

== Life and career ==
Goepel was born in Gotha, Thuringia on 10 October 1942. He was a member of the conservative Christian Democratic Union, part of the European People's Party. In 1990 he was elected as a member of the People's Chamber of the German Democratic Republic, representing the Democratic Farmers' Party of Germany (DBD), which later merged with the CDU.

Goepel died on 29 April 2026, at the age of 83.
