= Germany (European Parliament constituency) =

Constituency of the European Parliament

- European Parliament constituency
- Location among the current constituencies
- Member state: Germany
- Created: 1979
- MEPs: 81 (1979–1994); 99 (1994–2014); 96 (2014–present)

Between 1979 and German reunification in 1990, the Germany constituency only covered West Germany (marked in green on map).

Germany is a European Parliament constituency for elections in the European Union covering the member state of Germany. It is currently represented by ninety-six Members of the European Parliament, the most of any European Parliament constituency.

== Elections ==
=== 1979 ===
The 1979 European election was the first direct election to the European Parliament to be held and hence the first time West Germany had voted.

=== 1984 ===
The 1984 European election was the second election to the European Parliament and the second for West Germany.

=== 1989 ===
The 1989 European election was the third election to the European Parliament and the third for West Germany.

=== 1994 ===
The 1994 European election was the fourth election to the European Parliament and the fourth for Germany.

=== 1999 ===
The 1999 European election was the fifth election to the European Parliament and the fifth for Germany.

=== 2004 ===
The 2004 European election was the sixth election to the European Parliament and the sixth for Germany. The elections were held on 13 June 2004.

The elections saw a heavy defeat for the ruling Social Democratic Party, which polled its lowest share of the vote since World War II. More than half of this loss, however, went to other parties of the left, particularly the Greens. The votes of the opposition conservative parties, the Christian Democratic Union and the Christian Social Union, also fell, though not as sharply as the SPD's. The liberal Free Democratic Party improved its vote and gained representation.

=== 2009 ===
The 2009 European election was the seventh election to the European Parliament and the seventh for Germany.

=== 2014 ===
The 2014 European election was the eighth election to the European Parliament and the eighth for Germany.

=== 2019 ===
The 2019 European election was the ninth election to the European Parliament and the ninth for Germany.

=== 2024 ===
The 2024 European election was the tenth election to the European Parliament and the tenth for Germany.
