= Steinfurt III =

Federal electoral district of Germany

Coordinates: 52°14′10″N 7°43′11″E

127 Steinfurt III
- Electoral district for the Bundestag
- Steinfurt III in 2025
- State: North Rhine-Westphalia
- Population: 256,300 (2019)
- Electorate: 195,513 (2021)
- Major settlements: Ibbenbüren; Greven; Emsdetten
- Area: 1,092.5 km^{2}

Current electoral district
- Created: 1949
- Party: CDU
- Member: Anja Karliczek
- Elected: 2013, 2017, 2021, 2025

Steinfurt III is an electoral constituency (German: Wahlkreis) represented in the Bundestag. It elects one member via first-past-the-post voting. Under the current constituency numbering system, it is designated as constituency 127. It is located in northern North Rhine-Westphalia, comprising the eastern part of the Steinfurt district.

Steinfurt III was created for the inaugural 1949 federal election. Since 2013, it has been represented by Anja Karliczek of the Christian Democratic Union (CDU).

== Geography ==
Steinfurt III is located in northern North Rhine-Westphalia. As of the 2021 federal election, it comprises the municipalities of Emsdetten, Greven, Hörstel, Hopsten, Ibbenbüren, Ladbergen, Lengerich, Lienen, Lotte, Mettingen, Recke, Saerbeck, Tecklenburg, and Westerkappeln from the Steinfurt district.

== History ==
Steinfurt III was created in 1949, then known as Steinfurt – Tecklenburg. From 1965 through 1976, it was named Tecklenburg. From 1980 through 1998, it was named Steinfurt II. It acquired its current name in the 2002 election. In the 1949 election, it was North Rhine-Westphalia constituency 36 in the numbering system. From 1953 through 1961, it was number 95. From 1965 through 1976, it was number 93. From 1980 through 1998, it was number 98. From 2002 through 2009, it was number 129. In the 2013 through 2021 elections, it was number 128. From the 2025 election, it has been number 127.

Originally, the constituency comprised the districts of Steinfurt and Tecklenburg. From 1965 through 1976, it was coterminous with the Tecklenburg district. In the 1980 through 1998 elections, it comprised the municipalities of Emsdetten, Greven, Hörstel, Hopsten, Ibbenbüren, Ladbergen, Lengerich, Lienen, Lotte, Mettingen, Recke, Rheine, Saerbeck, Tecklenburg, and Westerkappeln from the Steinfurt district. In the 2002 election, it lost the municipality of Rheine.

Election	No.	Name	Borders
1949	36	Steinfurt – Tecklenburg	Steinfurt district; Tecklenburg district
1953	95	Steinfurt – Tecklenburg	Steinfurt district; Tecklenburg district
1957	95	Steinfurt – Tecklenburg	Steinfurt district; Tecklenburg district
1961	95	Steinfurt – Tecklenburg	Steinfurt district; Tecklenburg district
1965	93	Tecklenburg	Tecklenburg district
1969	93	Tecklenburg	Tecklenburg district
1972	93	Tecklenburg	Tecklenburg district
1976	93	Tecklenburg	Tecklenburg district
1980	98	Steinfurt II	Steinfurt district (only Emsdetten, Greven, Hörstel, Hopsten, Ibbenbüren, Ladbergen, Lengerich, Lienen, Lotte, Mettingen, Recke, Rheine, Saerbeck, Tecklenburg, and Westerkappeln municipalities)
1983	98	Steinfurt II	Steinfurt district (only Emsdetten, Greven, Hörstel, Hopsten, Ibbenbüren, Ladbergen, Lengerich, Lienen, Lotte, Mettingen, Recke, Rheine, Saerbeck, Tecklenburg, and Westerkappeln municipalities)
1987	98	Steinfurt II	Steinfurt district (only Emsdetten, Greven, Hörstel, Hopsten, Ibbenbüren, Ladbergen, Lengerich, Lienen, Lotte, Mettingen, Recke, Rheine, Saerbeck, Tecklenburg, and Westerkappeln municipalities)
1990	98	Steinfurt II	Steinfurt district (only Emsdetten, Greven, Hörstel, Hopsten, Ibbenbüren, Ladbergen, Lengerich, Lienen, Lotte, Mettingen, Recke, Rheine, Saerbeck, Tecklenburg, and Westerkappeln municipalities)
1994	98	Steinfurt II	Steinfurt district (only Emsdetten, Greven, Hörstel, Hopsten, Ibbenbüren, Ladbergen, Lengerich, Lienen, Lotte, Mettingen, Recke, Rheine, Saerbeck, Tecklenburg, and Westerkappeln municipalities)
1998	98	Steinfurt II	Steinfurt district (only Emsdetten, Greven, Hörstel, Hopsten, Ibbenbüren, Ladbergen, Lengerich, Lienen, Lotte, Mettingen, Recke, Rheine, Saerbeck, Tecklenburg, and Westerkappeln municipalities)
2002	129	Steinfurt III	Steinfurt district (only Emsdetten, Greven, Hörstel, Hopsten, Ibbenbüren, Ladbergen, Lengerich, Lienen, Lotte, Mettingen, Recke, Saerbeck, Tecklenburg, and Westerkappeln municipalities)
2005	129	Steinfurt III	Steinfurt district (only Emsdetten, Greven, Hörstel, Hopsten, Ibbenbüren, Ladbergen, Lengerich, Lienen, Lotte, Mettingen, Recke, Saerbeck, Tecklenburg, and Westerkappeln municipalities)
2009	129	Steinfurt III	Steinfurt district (only Emsdetten, Greven, Hörstel, Hopsten, Ibbenbüren, Ladbergen, Lengerich, Lienen, Lotte, Mettingen, Recke, Saerbeck, Tecklenburg, and Westerkappeln municipalities)
2013	128	Steinfurt III	Steinfurt district (only Emsdetten, Greven, Hörstel, Hopsten, Ibbenbüren, Ladbergen, Lengerich, Lienen, Lotte, Mettingen, Recke, Saerbeck, Tecklenburg, and Westerkappeln municipalities)
2017	128	Steinfurt III	Steinfurt district (only Emsdetten, Greven, Hörstel, Hopsten, Ibbenbüren, Ladbergen, Lengerich, Lienen, Lotte, Mettingen, Recke, Saerbeck, Tecklenburg, and Westerkappeln municipalities)
2021	128	Steinfurt III	Steinfurt district (only Emsdetten, Greven, Hörstel, Hopsten, Ibbenbüren, Ladbergen, Lengerich, Lienen, Lotte, Mettingen, Recke, Saerbeck, Tecklenburg, and Westerkappeln municipalities)
2025	127	Steinfurt III	Steinfurt district (only Emsdetten, Greven, Hörstel, Hopsten, Ibbenbüren, Ladbergen, Lengerich, Lienen, Lotte, Mettingen, Recke, Saerbeck, Tecklenburg, and Westerkappeln municipalities)

== Members ==
The constituency was first represented by Georg Pelster of the Christian Democratic Union (CDU) from 1949 to 1961, followed by fellow CDU member Franz Falke for a single term. Wilhelm Rawe of the CDU was then representative from 1965 to 1980. Gottfried Köster was elected in 1980, and succeeded by Constantin Heereman von Zuydtwyck in 1983. Karl-Josef Laumann then served a single term from 1990 to 1994. Reinhold Hemker of the Social Democratic Party (SPD) was elected in 1994 and served until 2009, when Dieter Jasper of the CDU became representative. Anja Karliczek was elected in 2013, and re-elected in 2017, 2021 and 2025.

Election	Member	Party	%
1949	Georg Pelster	CDU	36.9
1953	Georg Pelster	CDU	61.9
1957	Georg Pelster	CDU	60.8
1961	Franz Falke	CDU	59.0
1965	Wilhelm Rawe	CDU	59.2
1969	Wilhelm Rawe	CDU	57.0
1972	Wilhelm Rawe	CDU	50.2
1976	Wilhelm Rawe	CDU	52.4
1980	Gottfried Köster	CDU	46.0
1983	Constantin Heereman von Zuydtwyck	CDU	53.7
1987	Constantin Heereman von Zuydtwyck	CDU	45.6
1990	Karl-Josef Laumann	CDU	44.8
1994	Reinhold Hemker	SPD	45.1
1998	Reinhold Hemker	SPD	50.3
2002	Reinhold Hemker	SPD	47.2
2005	Reinhold Hemker	SPD	46.5
2009	Dieter Jasper	CDU	43.3
2013	Anja Karliczek	CDU	47.9
2017	Anja Karliczek	CDU	44.8
2021	Anja Karliczek	CDU	34.0
2025	Anja Karliczek	CDU	37.9

== Election results ==
=== 2025 election ===
Federal election (2025): Steinfurt III
Notes:	Blue background denotes the winner of the electorate vote. Pink background denotes a candidate elected from their party list. Yellow background denotes an electorate win by a list member, or other incumbent. A ✓ or ✗ denotes status of any incumbent, win or lose respectively.						
Party	Candidate	Votes	%	±%	Party votes	%	±%
CDU	✓ Anja Karliczek	62,252	37.9	▲3.9	54,548	33.1	▲5.6
SPD	Jürgen Coße	41,395	25.2	▼6.0	36,478	22.2	▼10.6
AfD	Gunnar Stephan	12,482	15.5	▲9.8	24,959	15.2	▲9.2
Greens	Jan-Niclas Gesenhues	19,383	11.8	▼3.7	19,903	12.1	▼3.4
Left	Ulrich Thoden	9,868	6.0	▲3.0	10,611	6.4	▲3.4
BSW					5,967	3.6	
FDP	Anne Hoss	4,874	3.0	▼4.4	6,572	4.0	▼6.4
Tierschutzpartei					1,783	1.1	▲0.1
Independent	Jörg Neurauter	1,209	0.7				
Volt					997	0.6	▲0.3
PARTEI				▼1.3	860	0.5	▼0.4
FW				▼0.6	798	0.5	0.0
dieBasis				▼0.8	328	0.2	▼0.6
Team Todenhöfer					281	0.2	▼0.1
PdF					267	0.2	▲0.1
BD					174	0.1	
Values					86	0.1	
MERA25					45	0.0	
MLPD					22	0.0	0.0
Pirates							▼0.3
Gesundheitsforschung							▼0.1
ÖDP							▼0.1
Humanists							▼0.1
V-Partei3					73	0.0	0.0
Bündnis C							0.0
SGP							0.0
Informal votes		1,124			908		
Total valid votes		164,463			164,679		
Turnout		165,587	85.3	▲5.7			
CDU hold	Majority	20,857	12.7				

=== 2021 election ===
Federal election (2021): Steinfurt III
Notes:	Blue background denotes the winner of the electorate vote. Pink background denotes a candidate elected from their party list. Yellow background denotes an electorate win by a list member, or other incumbent. A ✓ or ✗ denotes status of any incumbent, win or lose respectively.						
Party	Candidate	Votes	%	±%	Party votes	%	±%
CDU	✓ Anja Karliczek	52,445	34.0	▼10.8	42,528	27.5	▼10.3
SPD	Jürgen Coße	48,068	31.1	▲0.9	50,555	32.7	▲5.1
Greens	Jan-Niclas Gesenhues	23,978	15.5	▲9.0	23,996	15.5	▲8.2
FDP	Christian Markert	11,394	7.4	▲1.7	16,113	10.4	▼0.9
AfD	Florian Elixmann	8,785	5.7	▼0.6	9,253	6.0	▼0.8
Left	Kathrin Vogler	4,611	3.0	▼2.6	4,723	3.1	▼3.3
Tierschutzpartei					1,504	1.0	▲0.4
PARTEI	Heidi Pelster	2,062	1.3		1,446	0.9	▲0.3
dieBasis	Burkhard Recker	1,281	0.8		1,241	0.8	
FW	Ludwig Reichert	986	0.6	▼0.1	813	0.5	▲0.2
Independent	Hendrik Kaldewei	683	0.4				
Pirates					482	0.3	▼0.1
Team Todenhöfer					460	0.3	
Volt					401	0.3	
LIEBE					166	0.1	
Gesundheitsforschung					128	0.1	0.0
NPD					116	0.1	▼0.1
LfK					112	0.1	
ÖDP					97	0.1	0.0
Humanists					94	0.1	0.0
V-Partei3					73	0.0	0.0
Bündnis C					69	0.0	
Independent	Gabriele Georgiou	50	0.0				
PdF					39	0.0	
du.					34	0.0	
MLPD					29	0.0	0.0
LKR					27	0.0	
DKP					18	0.0	0.0
SGP					15	0.0	0.0
Informal votes		1,292			1,103		
Total valid votes		154,343			154,532		
Turnout		155,635	79.6	▲1.6			
CDU hold	Majority	4,377	2.9	▼11.7			

=== 2017 election ===
Federal election (2017): Steinfurt III
Notes:	Blue background denotes the winner of the electorate vote. Pink background denotes a candidate elected from their party list. Yellow background denotes an electorate win by a list member, or other incumbent. A ✓ or ✗ denotes status of any incumbent, win or lose respectively.						
Party	Candidate	Votes	%	±%	Party votes	%	±%
CDU	✓ Anja Karliczek	67,678	44.8	▼3.2	57,215	37.8	▼5.5
SPD	Jürgen Coße	45,797	30.3	▼6.2	41,815	27.6	▼5.8
Greens	Jan-Niclas Gesenhues	9,857	6.5	▲0.7	11,026	7.3	▼0.3
AfD	Michael Espendiller	9,530	6.3	▲4.5	10,342	6.8	▲4.0
FDP	Carsten Antrup	8,533	5.6	▲3.8	17,205	11.4	▲6.7
Left	Kathrin Vogler	8,520	5.6	▲1.8	9,692	6.4	▲1.7
PARTEI					899	0.6	▲0.3
Tierschutzpartei					794	0.5	
Pirates					560	0.4	▼1.4
FW	Olaf Wirl	1,124	0.7		421	0.3	▲0.1
AD-DEMOKRATEN					265	0.2	
NPD					259	0.2	▼0.5
ÖDP					118	0.1	0.0
DM					119	0.1	
Gesundheitsforschung					113	0.1	
V-Partei³					109	0.1	
DiB					106	0.1	
BGE					105	0.1	
MLPD	Gabriele Georgiou	138	0.1		68	0.0	0.0
Volksabstimmung					68	0.0	▼0.1
Die Humanisten					52	0.0	
DKP					20	0.0	
SGP					12	0.0	0.0
Informal votes		1,364			1,158		
Total valid votes		151,177			151,383		
Turnout		152,541	78.0	▲2.7			
CDU hold	Majority	21,881	14.5	▲3.1			

=== 2013 election ===
Federal election (2013): Steinfurt III
Notes:	Blue background denotes the winner of the electorate vote. Pink background denotes a candidate elected from their party list. Yellow background denotes an electorate win by a list member, or other incumbent. A ✓ or ✗ denotes status of any incumbent, win or lose respectively.						
Party	Candidate	Votes	%	±%	Party votes	%	±%
CDU	Anja Karliczek	69,385	47.9	▲4.7	62,729	43.3	▲7.5
SPD	Jürgen Coße (Note: Coße entered the Bundestag on the SPD list after the resignation of Petra Hinz in September 2016.)	52,786	36.5	▼4.9	48,324	33.4	▲2.8
Greens	Hermann Stubbe	8,464	5.8		10,981	7.6	▼1.8
Left	Kathrin Vogler	5,533	3.8	▼2.6	6,765	4.7	▼1.8
FDP	Christophe Lüttmann	2,603	1.8	▼6.4	6,822	4.7	▼9.3
AfD	Mario Mieruch	2,566	1.8		4,028	2.8	
Pirates	René Rottmann	2,356	1.6		2,504	1.7	▲0.3
NPD		1,021	0.7	▼0.1	940	0.6	0.0
PARTEI					465	0.3	
FW					279	0.2	
Volksabstimmung					156	0.1	▲0.1
Nichtwahler					133	0.1	
ÖDP					123	0.1	0.0
PRO					115	0.1	
REP					96	0.1	▼0.1
Party of Reason					89	0.1	
BIG					74	0.1	
RRP					50	0.0	▼0.1
MLPD					25	0.0	0.0
PSG					24	0.0	0.0
BüSo					16	0.0	0.0
Die Rechte					16	0.0	
Informal votes		1,336			1,296		
Total valid votes		144,714			144,754		
Turnout		146,050	75.3	▲0.8			
CDU hold	Majority	16,599	11.4	▲9.6			

=== 2009 election ===
Federal election (2009): Steinfurt III
Notes:	Blue background denotes the winner of the electorate vote. Pink background denotes a candidate elected from their party list. Yellow background denotes an electorate win by a list member, or other incumbent. A ✓ or ✗ denotes status of any incumbent, win or lose respectively.						
Party	Candidate	Votes	%	±%	Party votes	%	±%
CDU	Dieter Jasper	61,444	43.3	▲0.5	51,067	35.9	▼0.8
SPD	✗ Reinhold Hemker	58,679	41.3	▼5.1	43,523	30.6	▼10.8
FDP	Hubert Klodt	11,613	8.2	▲4.3	20,001	14.0	▲4.4
Greens					13,366	9.4	▲2.9
Left	Kathrin Vogler	9,075	6.4	▲3.4	9,250	6.5	▲2.7
Pirates					2,047	1.4	
NPD	Matthias Pohl	1,129	0.8	▲0.1	929	0.7	0.0
FAMILIE					686	0.5	▲0.1
Tierschutzpartei					555	0.4	0.0
RENTNER					286	0.2	
REP					204	0.1	0.0
RRP					169	0.1	
ÖDP					85	0.1	
DVU					71	0.0	
Centre					63	0.0	0.0
Volksabstimmung					56	0.0	0.0
BüSo					24	0.0	0.0
PSG					15	0.0	0.0
MLPD					14	0.0	0.0
Informal votes		1,842			1,371		
Total valid votes		141,940			142,411		
Turnout		143,782	74.5	▼6.7			
CDU gain from SPD	Majority	2,765	2.0				

=== 2005 election ===
Federal election (2005): Steinfurt III
Notes:	Blue background denotes the winner of the electorate vote. Pink background denotes a candidate elected from their party list. Yellow background denotes an electorate win by a list member, or other incumbent. A ✓ or ✗ denotes status of any incumbent, win or lose respectively.						
Party	Candidate	Votes	%	±%	Party votes	%	±%
SPD	✓ Reinhold Hemker	70,456	46.5	▼0.7	62,649	41.3	▼2.7
CDU	Philipp Freiherr Heereman von Zuydtwyck	64,892	42.8	▲1.0	55,583	36.7	▲0.2
FDP	Jürgen Decker	5,814	3.8	▼2.0	14,664	9.7	▼0.1
Greens	Ferdinand Blanke	4,760	3.1	▼1.2	9,813	6.5	▼1.0
Left	Andrea Helling	4,588	3.0	▲2.1	5,766	3.8	▲3.0
NPD	Matthias Pohl	1,128	0.7		1,024	0.7	▲0.5
Familie					570	0.4	▲0.1
Tierschutzpartei					523	0.3	▲0.1
GRAUEN					381	0.3	▲0.2
REP					290	0.2	
PBC					124	0.1	
From Now on... Democracy Through Referendum					106	0.1	
Centre					47	0.0	
Socialist Equality Party					37	0.0	
MLPD					28	0.0	
BüSo					11	0.0	0.0
Informal votes		1,884			1,906		
Total valid votes		151,638			151,616		
Turnout		153,522	81.2	▼1.8			
SPD hold	Majority	5,564	3.7				
