= Pilar del Castillo =

Spanish politician (born 1952)

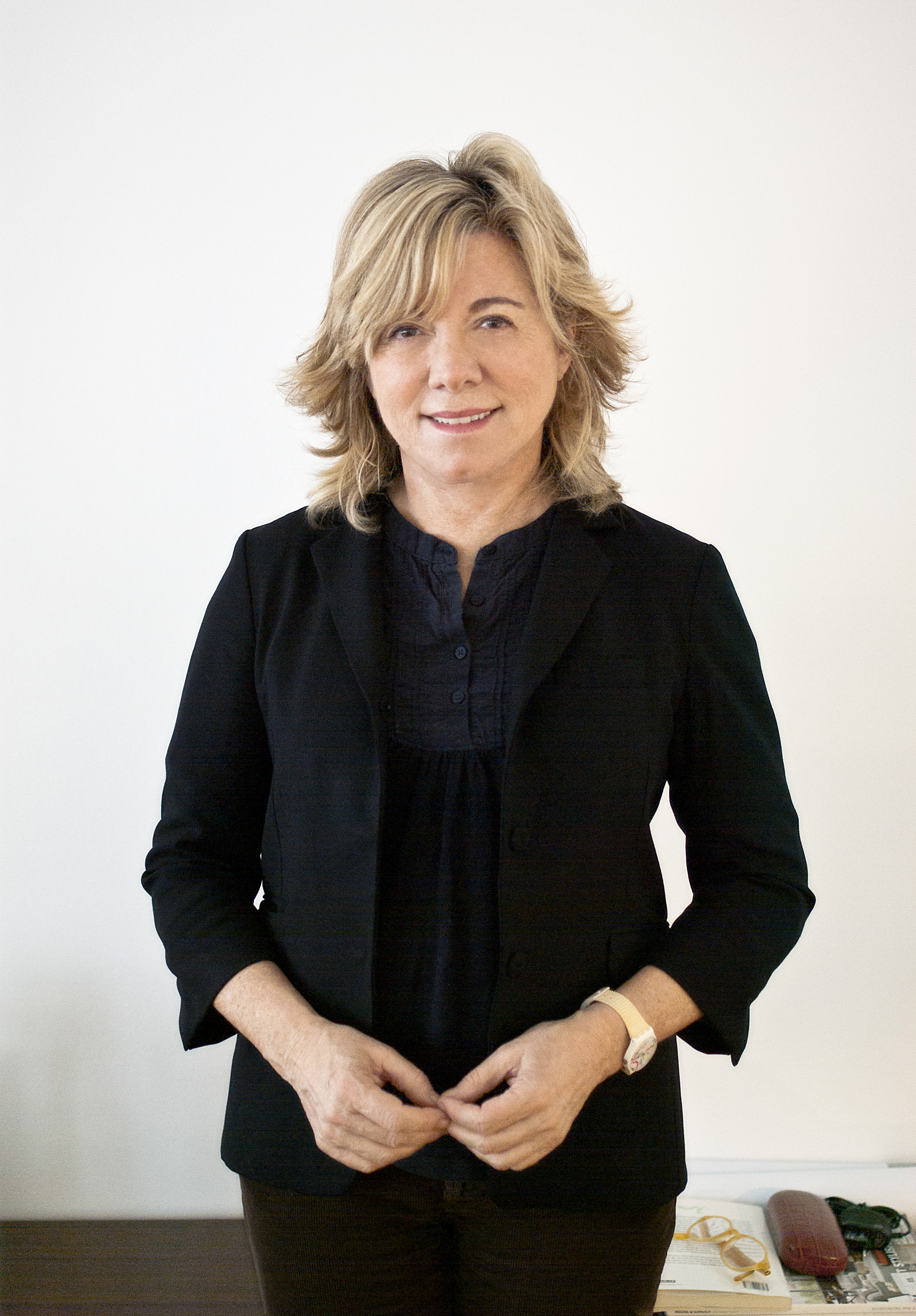
- Pilar del Castillo in 2014

Member of the European Parliament for Spain
- Incumbent
- Assumed office 20 July 2004

Minister of Education, Culture and Sport
- In office 27 April 2000 – 17 April 2004
- Prime Minister: José María Aznar
- Preceded by: Mariano Rajoy
- Succeeded by: María Jesús San Segundo

Director of the Centre for Sociological Research
- In office 24 May 1996 – 27 April 2000
- Prime Minister: José María Aznar
- Preceded by: Joaquín Arango Vila-Belda
- Succeeded by: Ricardo Montoro

Personal details
- Born: Pilar del Castillo Vera; 31 July 1952 (age 74) Nador, Spanish protectorate in Morocco
- Party: People's Party (2000–present)
- Other political affiliations: OCE-BR (1970–1974)
- Spouse: Guillermo Gortázar
- Children: 2
- Education: Technical University of Madrid; Ohio State University; Complutense University of Madrid

Pilar del Castillo Vera (pronounced [piˈlaɾ ðel kasˈtiʎo]; born 31 July 1952) is a Spanish politician who has been serving as a Member of the European Parliament since 2004. She previously served as Minister for Education, Culture and Sport in the government of Prime Minister José María Aznar from 2000 to 2004.

== Early life and education ==
Law graduate at Complutense University of Madrid, 1974. In 1980 she was granted a Fulbright Scholarship for a master's degree in political science at Ohio State University, United States. PhD in law from Complutense University of Madrid, 1983. Awarded the Spanish Sociological Research Centre Prize for the doctoral thesis 'Political Party Funding in Western Democracies', 1984.

== Career ==
In 1986, Del Castillo became assistant professor in constitutional law at UNED, and professor in political science and administration in 1994. Editor-in-chief of the Journal Nueva Revista de Política, Cultura y Arte, 1995–1996. Director of the Spanish Sociological Research Centre, 1996 to 2000. She is author of numerous publications on political parties and electoral behaviour.

== Political career ==
=== Minister of Education, Culture and Sport, 2000–2004 ===
When Prime Minister José Maria Aznar led his conservative Popular Party to a victory and second term of office at the 2000 national elections, he made Del Castillo his new Minister of Education, Culture and Sport. In this capacity, she was in charge of implementing the government's 2001 plan to overhaul the country's public universities; the law prompted the largest student demonstrations since Spain's transition to democracy, with an estimated 100,000 students, university staff protesting nationwide on 1 December 2001.

=== Member of the European Parliament, 2004–present ===
Del Castillo has been a Member of the European Parliament since the 2004 European elections. She has since been serving as coordinator for the Group of the European People's Party in the Committee on Industry, Research and Energy (ITRE), and as substitute member in the Committee on Economic and Monetary Affairs (ECON). From 2007 to 2009, she was a member of the Temporary Committee on Climate Change. In addition, she was a member of the EP Delegation for Relations with India (2009–2014) and of the Delegation for relations with the People's Republic of China (2004–2009). She represented the Parliament at the 2008 United Nations Climate Change Conference in Poznań and the 2009 United Nations Climate Change Conference in Copenhagen. In 2020, she also joined the Special Committee on Artificial Intelligence in a Digital Age.

In her capacity as member of the Committee on Industry, Research and Energy, Del Castillo is the parliament's rapporteur on the European Union's Data Act. She also served as rapporteur on the Directive on Security of Networks and Information Systems (NIS); the Regulation on the Body of European Regulators in Electronic Communications (BEREC); on the Cloud Computing Strategy for Europe; and on a telecoms single market.

In addition to her committee assignments, Del Castillo holds the following positions in the European Parliament:

- European Energy Forum (EEF), member
- European Internet Foundation, chairwoman
- European Parliament Intergroup on Disability, member
- Transatlantic Policy Network (TPN), member
- Knowledge4Innovation (K4I), member of the board

== Other activities ==
- European Ideas Network (EIN), chair of the 'Energy and Environment' Permanent Working Group
- European Network for Women in Leadership (WIL), member
- Spanish Foundation for Social Studies and Analysis (FAES), member of the board of trustees
- Prado Museum, member of the board of trustees
- Fundación Botín, member of the advisory board
- Fundación Ortega-Marañón, member of the board of trustees

== Personal life ==
Del Castillo is passionate about art; her official ministerial portrait in the gallery of the Ministry of Education is a self-portrait.

She was previously married to Guillermo Gortázar, a historian and former politician of the People's Party (PP). They lived together for some years in a 16th Century renaissance-style palace in the town of Trujillo, Extremadura.
