= Peter Liese =

German physician and politician (born 1965)

Peter Liese MEP
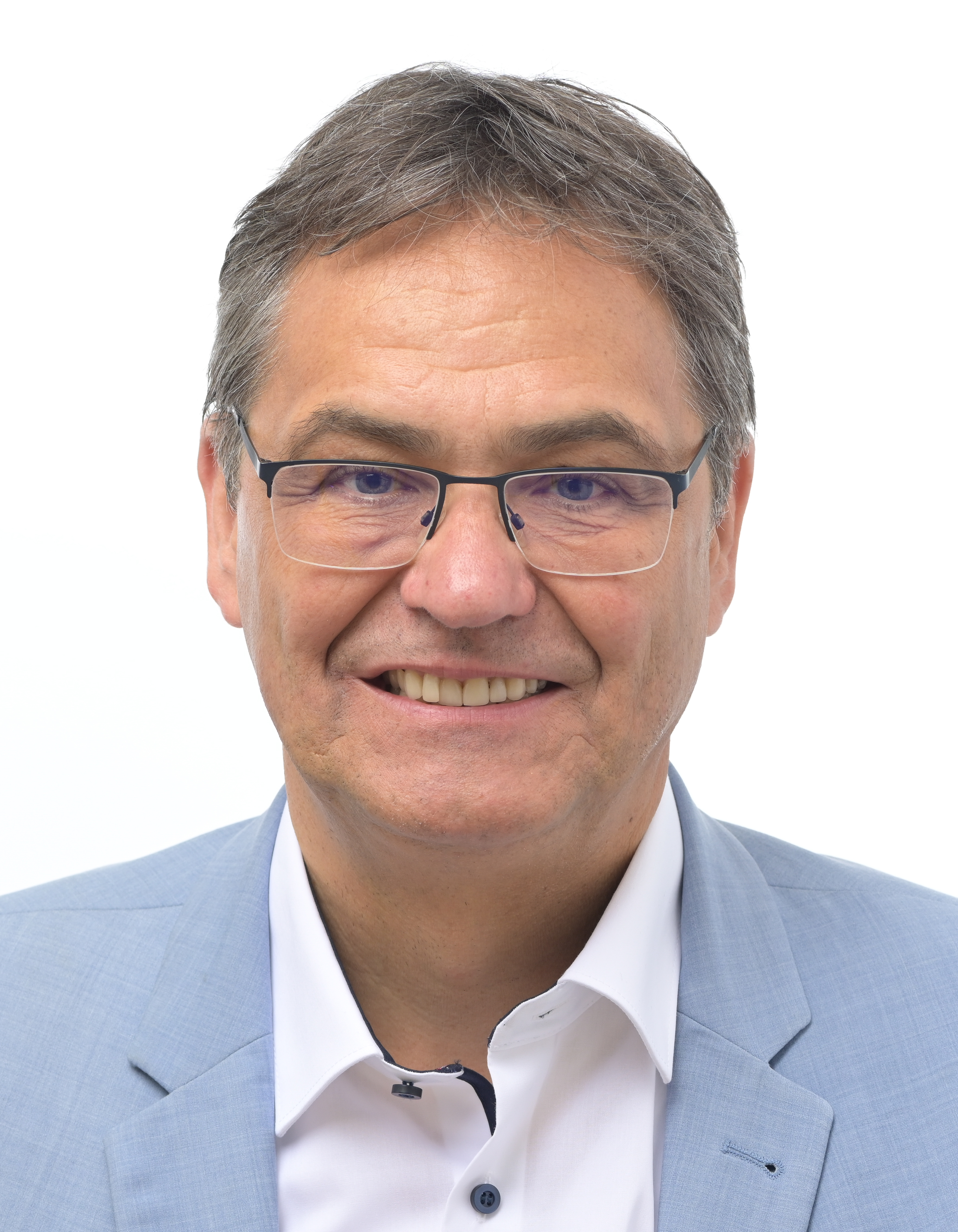

Member of the European Parliament
- Incumbent
- Assumed office 1 July 1994
- Constituency: Germany

Personal details
- Born: 20 May 1965 (age 60) Olsberg, North Rhine-Westphalia, West Germany
- Party: German: Christian Democratic Union; EU: European People's Party

Video-Introduction

Hans-Peter Liese (born 20 May 1965) is a German physician and politician who has been serving as a Member of the European Parliament since 1994. He is a member of the Christian Democratic Union, part of the European People's Party.

== Education ==
- 1991: Second state examination in medicine
- 1989–1992: Graduated as doctor at the Institute of Humane Genetics of the University of Bonn

== Early career ==
- until 1994: Ward doctor in Paderborn children's hospital
- since 1994: Doctor in general practice and internist

== Political career ==
=== Career in state politics ===
- Former member of the Land executive of the Young Union, North Rhine-Westphalia
- 1991-1997: District Chairman of the Junge Union
- Member of the Land executive of the CDU, North Rhine-Westphalia
- 1989-1994: Member of Bestwig local council

=== Member of the European Parliament, 1994–present ===
Liese sits on the European Parliament's Committee on the Environment, Public Health and Food Safety, where he serves as the European People's Party Group’s coordinator. In this capacity, he was responsible for writing reports on including aviation within the European Union Emission Trading Scheme (2007) and an ETS reform (2021). In 2020, he also joined the Special Committee on Beating Cancer. Between 2000 and 2001, he served on the European Parliament’s Temporary Committee on Human Genetics and Other New Technologies in Modern Medicine.

Liese is a substitute for the Committee on Industry, Research and Energy, a member of the Delegation for relations with the countries of Central America and a substitute for the Delegation to the EU-Mexico Joint Parliamentary Committee. He was part of the Parliament's delegations to the 2008 United Nations Climate Change Conference in Poznań, to the 2013 United Nations Climate Change Conference in Warsaw and to the 2016 United Nations Climate Change Conference in Marrakesh.

In addition, Liese serves as member of the European Parliament Intergroup on the Welfare and Conservation of Animals and of the European Parliament Intergroup on Biodiversity, Countryside, Hunting and Recreational Fisheries. Previously, he was a member of the European Parliament Intergroup on Active Ageing and Intergenerational Solidarity. In 2014, he supported Françoise Grossetête’s proposal to establish a European Parliament Intergroup on Health for Citizens, including stakeholders such as the European Cancer Patients Association and the Organisation for European Cancer Institutes.

Liese has also been chairing the EPP Health Ministers Meeting (alongside Stella Kyriakides), which gathers the center-right EPP ministers ahead of meetings of the Employment, Social Policy, Health and Consumer Affairs Council (EPSCO). He is a member of the EPP Working Group on Bioethics and Human Dignity.

=== Role in national politics ===
From 2012 until 2018, Liese was a member of the CDU leadership under the party’s successive chairwomen Angela Merkel (2012-2018) and Annegret Kramp-Karrenbauer (2018). In the negotiations to form a Grand Coalition of Merkel's Christian Democrats (CDU together with the Bavarian CSU) and the SPD following the 2013 federal elections, he was part of the CDU delegation in the working group on consumer protection. In similar negotiations following the 2017 federal elections, he was part of the working group on energy, climate protection and the environment, led by Armin Laschet, Georg Nüßlein and Barbara Hendricks.

In the negotiations to form a coalition government of the CDU and Green Party under Minister-President of North Rhine-Westphalia Hendrik Wüst following the 2022 state elections, Liese led his party’s delegation in the working group on the environment, agriculture and consumer protection; his counterparts from the Green Party were Jan-Niclas Gesenhues and Norwich Rüße.

== Political positions ==
Liese is known for his work on a human cells and tissues directive and conservative stance on stem cell research.

In a background paper presented to the EPP in summer 2017, Liese proposed to scrap the Strasbourg seat of the European Parliament and give the French city the European Medicines Agency (EMA) instead.

Ahead of the Christian Democrats’ leadership election in 2018, Liese publicly endorsed Friedrich Merz to succeed Angela Merkel as the party's chair.

== Other activities ==
- Central Committee of German Catholics, Member (since 1997)
- German Industry Initiative for Energy Efficiency (DENEFF), Member of the Parliamentary Advisory Board
- Stiftung Zukunftsfähigkeit, Member of the Advisory Board
- St. Maria zur Wiese, Member of the Board of Trustees
