= Mettingen =

- Municipality
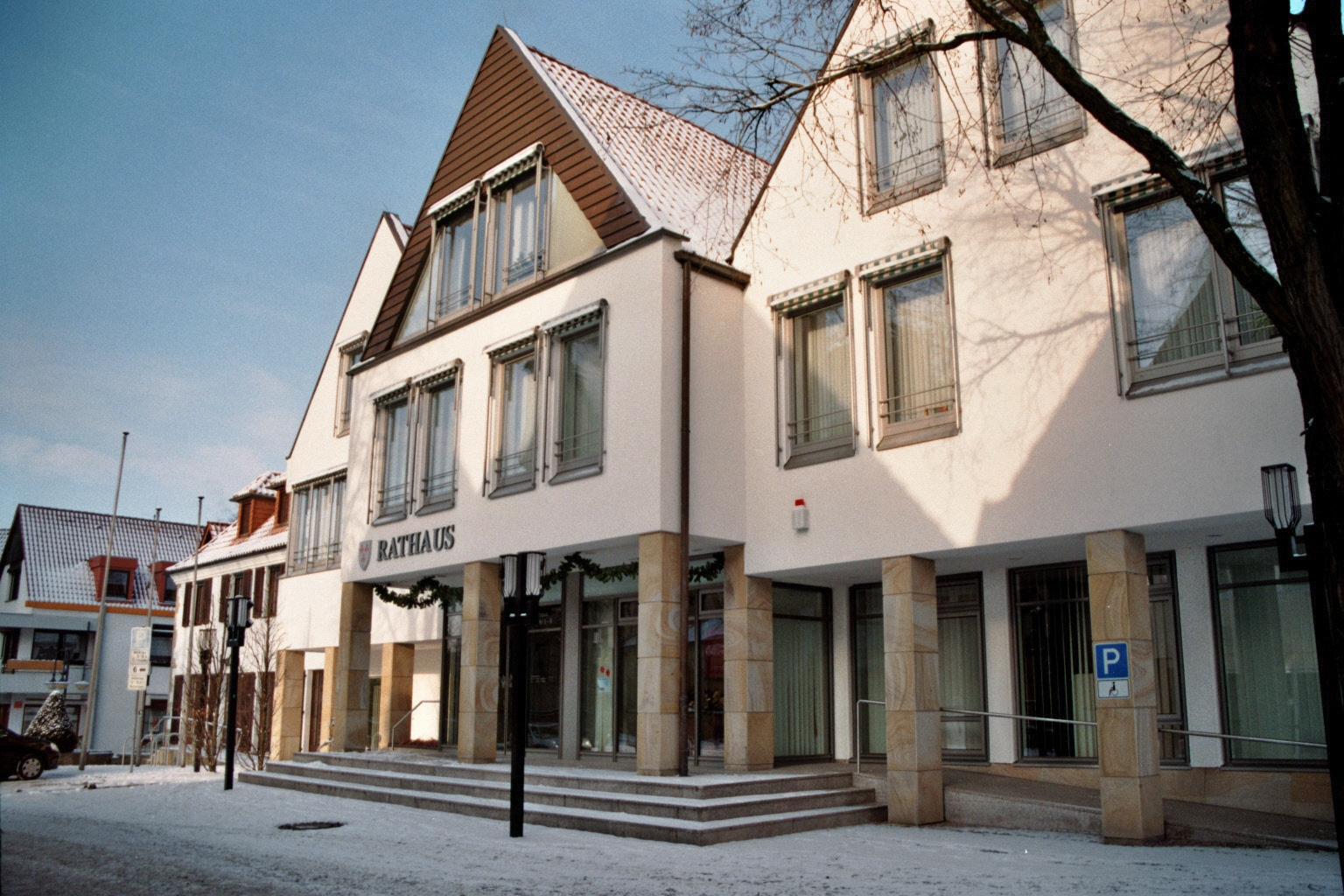
- Town hall

- Coat of arms

- Location of Mettingen within Steinfurt district
- Interactive map of Mettingen
- Location within Germany Location within North Rhine-Westphalia
- Coordinates: 52°19′0″N 7°46′50″E
- Country: Germany
- State: North Rhine-Westphalia
- Admin. region: Münster
- District: Steinfurt

Government
  - Mayor (2020–25): Christina Rählmann (SPD)

Area
  - Total: 40.6 km^{2} (15.7 sq mi)
- Elevation: 74 m (243 ft)

Population (2025-12-31)
  - Total: 11,651
  - Density: 287/km^{2} (743/sq mi)
- Time zone: UTC+01:00 (CET)
  - Summer (DST): UTC+02:00 (CEST)
- Postal codes: 49497
- Dialling codes: 05452
- Vehicle registration: ST
- Website: www.mettingen.de

Mettingen (German pronunciation: [ˈmɛtɪŋən]) is a municipality in the district of Steinfurt, in North Rhine-Westphalia, Germany.

== Geography ==
Mettingen is situated approximately 25 km east of Rheine and 20 km west of Osnabrück.

Neighbour villages of Mettingen are Recke in the west, Neuenkirchen, (Lower Saxony) in the north, Ibbenbüren in the south and Westerkappeln in the east.

== Population ==
Historical population

Year	Pop.	±% p.a.
1965	9,625	—
1970	9,929	+0.62%
1975	10,011	+0.16%
1980	10,158	+0.29%
1985	10,366	+0.41%
1990	10,776	+0.78%
1995	11,783	+1.80%

Year	Pop.	±% p.a.
2000	12,351	+0.95%
2005	12,354	+0.00%
2010	12,105	−0.41%
2015	11,815	−0.48%
2020	11,878	+0.11%
2025	11,651	−0.39%

Source: Landesdatabank Nordrhein-Westfalen

== Economy ==
The production site of the frozen cakes manufacturer Coppenrath & Wiese is based in Mettingen. Until 2018 Mettingen had one of the last two active coal mines in Germany.

== People from Mettingen ==
- Felix Lobrecht (born 1988), German stand-up comedian, podcast host, and author.
- Clemens (1818–1902) and August (1819–1892) Brenninkmeijer brothers who co-founded department store C&A in Sneek, The Netherlands
- Josef Wiese (1932–2009), co-founder of Coppenrath & Wiese
- Kasper König (1943–2024), from 2000 until the end of October 2012 director of the Museum Ludwig, art professor and curator
- Peter Niemeyer (born 1983), German footballer
- Annika Suthe (born 1985), German spearhead, 2004 Olympian and Junior European champion

=== Honorary citizens ===
- Clemens Brenninkmeyer (1932)
- Franz Brenninkmeyer (1969)
- Theodor Kersting (1973)
- Josef Wiese (2005)
