= Guillermo Martínez Casañ =

Spanish politician

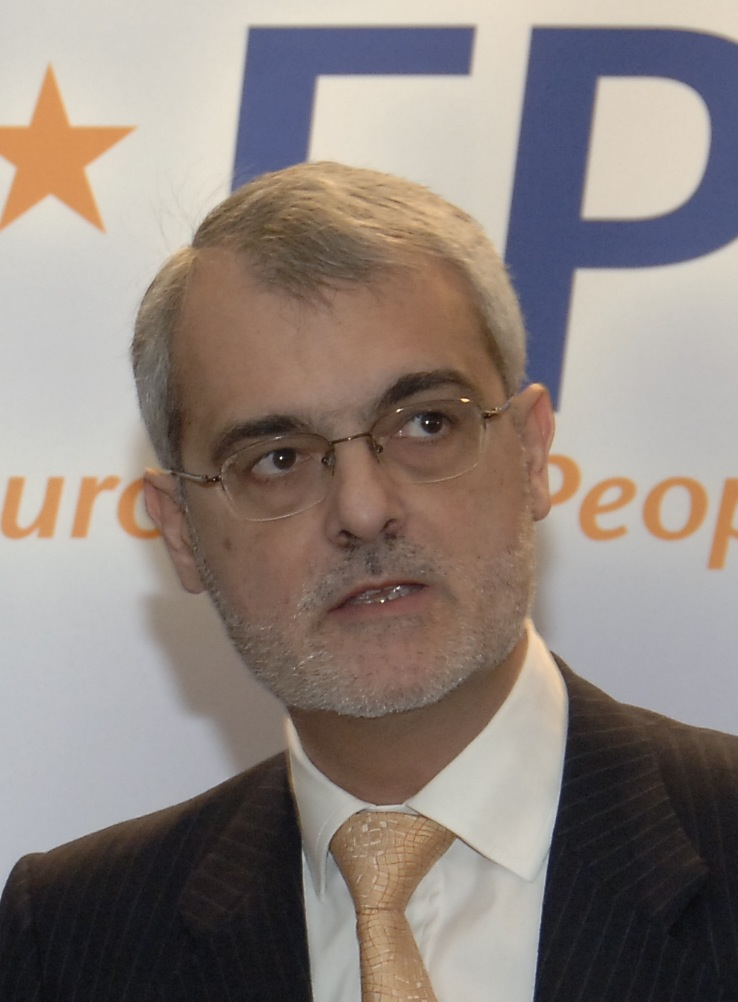
Guillermo Martínez Casañ

Guillermo Martínez Casañ (Valencia, Spain, 4 December 1955) is a Spanish politician and former Member of the Spanish Parliament who belongs to the People's Party (PP).

Martínez is qualified in law and has LL.M. in Air and Space Law, Shipping Law, as well as in International law from University College London. He began his professional career working as a counsel lawyer in the UK and France before entering politics in 1986 becoming a Principal Administrator in the European Parliament. He was active in Observer during the Turkish referendum at the end of the military regime, the end of Sandinism in Nicaragua and the end of Apartheid in South Africa. He was in charge of the Temporary Committee for the Unification of Germany.

He joined the Spanish Parliament in 1993 when he was elected to the Spanish Congress of Deputies from Valencia region, which he represented until 2004. He served as the spokesman of the Committee on the Affairs of the European Union in both upper and lower legislative chambers. Martínez-Casan was a member of the Parliamentary Assembly of the Council of Europe as the chairman of the Committee on the Environment, Agriculture and Local and Regional Affairs. He was appointed as a rapporteur on Caucasus and Azerbaijan affairs on several occasions.

His other titles included the vice-president of the Spanish delegation and the chairman of the Conservative Group and Political Committee in the Western European Union Assembly; vice-chairman of the European Movement Spain and board member of the European Movement International. Afterwards, he joined the Cabinet of Ms Loyola de Palacio.

In January 2005, he re-joined his post as an official in the European Parliament. Since 2005, Martínez-Casan has been the director of the European Ideas Network (EIN) a centre-right think tank sponsored by the European People's Party Group (EPP Group). Since 2009, Mr Martínez-Casan is one of the two co-secretary's generals, with Walid Phares of the Trans-Atlantic Group on Counter Jihad Terrorism (TAG) with offices in Brussels and Washington DC.
