= Coppenrath & Wiese =

German food company

Coppenrath & Wiese KG
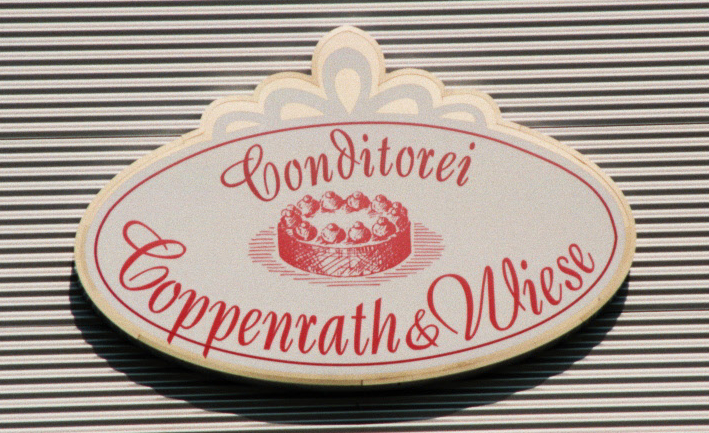
- Type: KG
- Industry: Food
- Founded: 1975
- Founder: Aloys Coppenrath, Josef Wiese
- Headquarters: Osnabrück, Germany
- Key people: Andreas Wallmeier, Peter Schmidt
- Products: Cake
- Revenue: Approximately EUR 370 million (2011)
- Number of employees: 2,200 (2011)
- Parent: Dr. Oetker KG
- Website: www.coppenrath-wiese.com

Coppenrath & Wiese KG (German pronunciation: [ˈkɔpm̩ʁaːt ʊnt ˈviːzə]) is a German food company that is one of the largest manufacturers of frozen bakery products in Europe. The company mainly produces frozen pies, cakes, tortes, tarts and bread rolls. The head office is in Osnabrück. In 2010, the company employed about 1,700 people at its production site Mettingen and 300 at their administrative and logistics base in Osnabrück district.

== History ==
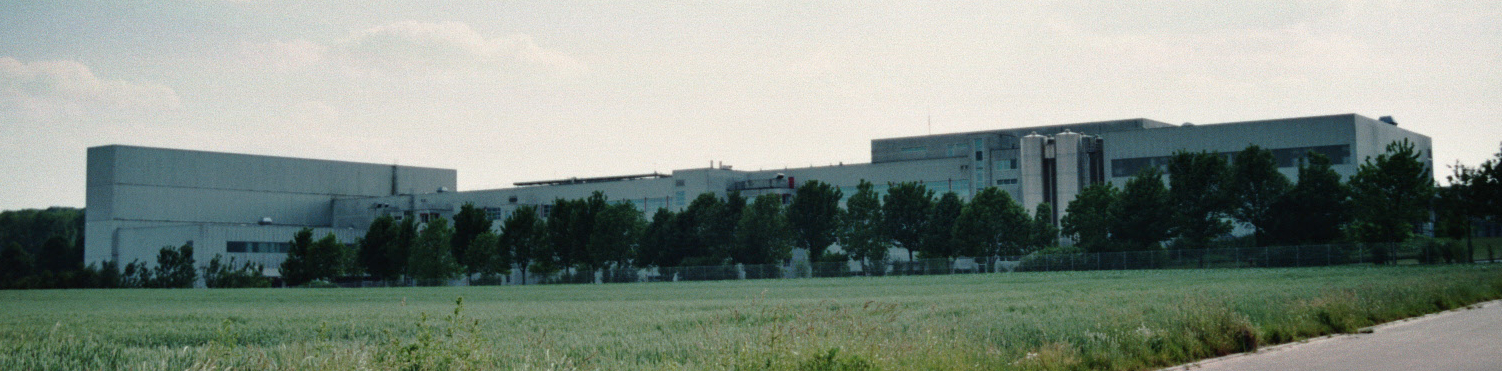
Coppenrath & Wiese production site in Mettingen

Production of frozen cakes began in 1975 at the old dairy in Westerkappeln, when the cousins Aloys Coppenrath and Josef Wiese who had previously run a small bakery in the village of Mettingen joined forces. Production was continuously expanded and new products added to the range. In 1992 a new production plant in Mettingen commenced operations. A small production area was left in neighbouring Westerkappeln until in 2003 the production shifted totally to Mettingen. The products of the company are now distributed throughout Europe and since 2005 to the United States and since 2010 to Australia. The company headquarters in the United Kingdom is in Castleford, West Yorkshire and in Cumming, Georgia, for their US operations.

In 2015, the company was acquired by Dr. Oetker.

== Products ==
The range sold in Germany comprises more than 70 different tarts, tortes, pies and cakes including pavlovas, cheesecakes, strudels, crumbles and marscapones. The flagship product of the company is a Black Forest Gateau.
