= European Internet Forum =

Foundation

The European Internet Forum (EIF), formerly European Internet Foundation, is an independent, non-profit body supporting Members of the European Parliament (MEPs) in their efforts to shape policy and regulation relating to the internet.

The organization exists to promote understanding among MEPs of developments in information and communication technologies. It hosts a continuous programme of live debates, special projects and interactive communication activities, featuring speakers from around the world, largely from the European Parliament's location in Brussels, Belgium.

== History and membership ==
The EIF was founded in March 2000 by MEPs James Elles, Erika Mann and Elly Plooij-van Gorsel. The current Chair is Pilar del Castillo.

It is led and governed by its Political Members, all of whom are elected Members of the European Parliament (MEPs). Membership in the European Internet Foundation is open to all current MEPs. The Foundation is financed primarily through membership fees charged to Business and Associate Members, including a core of prominent European e-companies. Membership is open on a progressive, non-discriminatory fee basis to any duly constituted commercial entity or interest group pledging support for the foundation's founding principles.
