= Anja Karliczek =

German politician

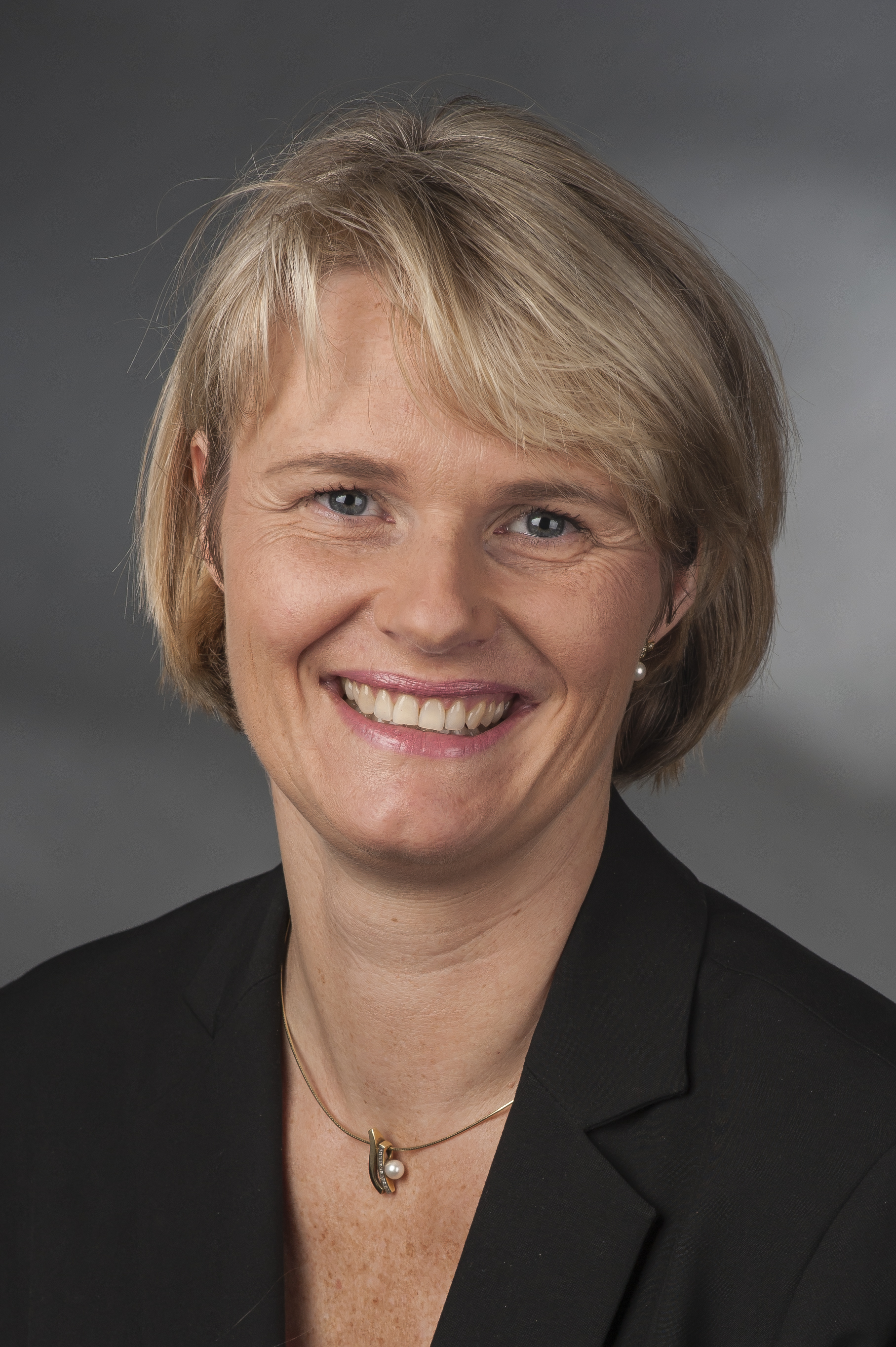

Minister of Education and Research
- In office 14 March 2018 – 8 December 2021
- Chancellor: Angela Merkel
- Preceded by: Johanna Wanka
- Succeeded by: Bettina Stark-Watzinger

Member of the Bundestag for Steinfurt III
- Incumbent
- Assumed office 22 September 2013
- Preceded by: Dieter Jasper

Personal details
- Born: Anja Maria-Antonia Kerssen; 29 April 1971 (age 55) Ibbenbüren, West Germany (now Germany)
- Party: Christian Democratic Union
- Spouse: Lothar Karliczek
- Children: 3

Anja Maria-Antonia Karliczek (née Kerssen; born 29 April 1971) is a German politician of the Christian Democratic Union (CDU) who served as Minister of Education and Research in Chancellor Angela Merkel's fourth cabinet from 2018 to 2021.

== Early life and career ==
Karliczek was born in Ibbenbüren and grew up in Tecklenburg. After an apprenticeship at Deutsche Bank in Osnabrück, she moved to work in her family's hotel in 1993. While raising a family and working full-time, Karliczek studied business administration at University of Hagen from 2003 until 2008, with a diploma thesis analysing the fiscal advantages of transferring pension obligations from the employer’s point of view.

== Political career ==
Karliczek joined the CDU in 1998 and became the party's local chair in Tecklenburg in 2011.

=== Member of Parliament, 2013–present ===
Karliczek has been a member of the Bundestag since the 2013 elections, representing Steinfurt III. Between 2013 and 2018, she was a member of the Finance Committee, where she served as the CDU/CSU parliamentary group’s rapporteur on occupational and fully funded pension schemes and employee shareholding. From 2017, she also served as deputy of Michael Grosse-Brömer in his role as First Secretary of the parliamentary group. In this capacity, she was a member of the parliament’s Council of Elders, which – among other duties – determines daily legislative agenda items and assigns committee chairpersons based on party representation.

In addition to her committee assignments, Karliczek is a member of the German-Slovenian Parliamentary Friendship Group. Within the CDU/CSU, she is a member of MIT, its pro-business wing. She also belongs to the Münsterland Circle (Münsterlandrunde) which brings together all parliamentarians from the eponymous region in Westphalia; it also includes Sybille Benning and Jens Spahn, among others.

Since the 2021 elections, Karliczek has been serving on the Committee on Tourism and the Committee on the Environment, Nature Conservation, Nuclear Safety, and Consumer Protection. From 2021 to 2025, she was also her parliamentary group’s spokesperson for tourism.

In the negotiations to form a coalition government of the CDU and Green Party under Minister-President of North Rhine-Westphalia Hendrik Wüst following the 2022 state elections, Karliczek led her party’s delegation in the working group on research, innovation and digitization.

Since 2025, Karliczek has been serving as chairwoman of the German Parliament's Committee on Tourism.

=== Federal Minister of Education and Research, 2018–2021 ===
In her capacity as minister, Karliczek was a member of the Joint Science Conference (GWK), a body which deals with all questions of research funding, science and research policy strategies and the science system that jointly affect Germany’s federal government and its 16 federal states.

During Karliczek’s term, the German government introduced annual incentives worth 1.25 billion euros in 2019 aimed at supporting corporate research and development and boosting investments in cutting-edge technologies. In 2021, she publicly opposed proposals from the European Commission to restrict the right of scientists based in non-EU countries to collaborate in EU-funded projects on sensitive parts of the bloc’s €90 billion Horizon Europe scientific co-operation programme.

As a representative of the German government, Karliczek was part of the delegation accompanying President Emmanuel Macron of France on his state visit to China in November 2019.

== Other activities ==
- German Catholic Women's Association (KDFB), President (since 2023)
- Deutsche Telekom Foundation, Member of the Board of Trustees
- Alexander von Humboldt Foundation, Ex-Officio Member of the Board of Trustees (2018–2021)
- Deutscher Zukunftspreis, Ex-Officio Member of the Board of Trustees (2018–2021)
- Ernst Reuter Foundation for Advanced Study, Ex-Officio Vice-Chair of the Board of Trustees (2018–2021)
- German Forum for Crime Prevention (DFK), Ex-Officio Member of the Board of Trustees (2018–2021)
- German National Association for Student Affairs, Ex-Officio Member of the Board of Trustees (2018–2021)
- Helmholtz Association of German Research Centres, Ex-Officio Member of the Senate (2018–2021)
- Leibniz Association, Ex-Officio Member of the Senate (2018–2021)
- Max Planck Society, Member of the Senate (2018–2021)
- Deutsche Renten Information (DRI), Member of the Advisory Board
- Rotary International, Member
- Total E-Quality initiative, Member of the Board of Trustees

== Political positions ==
In June 2017, Karliczek voted against Germany’s introduction of same-sex marriage. In 2018, she faced criticism after she questioned Germany's decision to recognize marriage equality in a television interview.

In November 2018, Karliczek successfully suggested to ease the terms of the 5G build-out plan for network providers, declaring "we don't need 5G internet next to every milk churn". This was supposed to allow a slower proliferation of fast mobile internet in large parts of Germany in exchange for a larger amount to be gained by the federal government from the auction of frequency bands to operators.

== Personal life ==
She married Eurowings pilot Lothar Karliczek in 1995; they have three children.

Political offices
Preceded by Johanna Wanka	Minister of Education and Research; 2018–2021	Succeeded by Bettina Stark-Watzinger
