= Christian Loose =

German politician (born 1975)

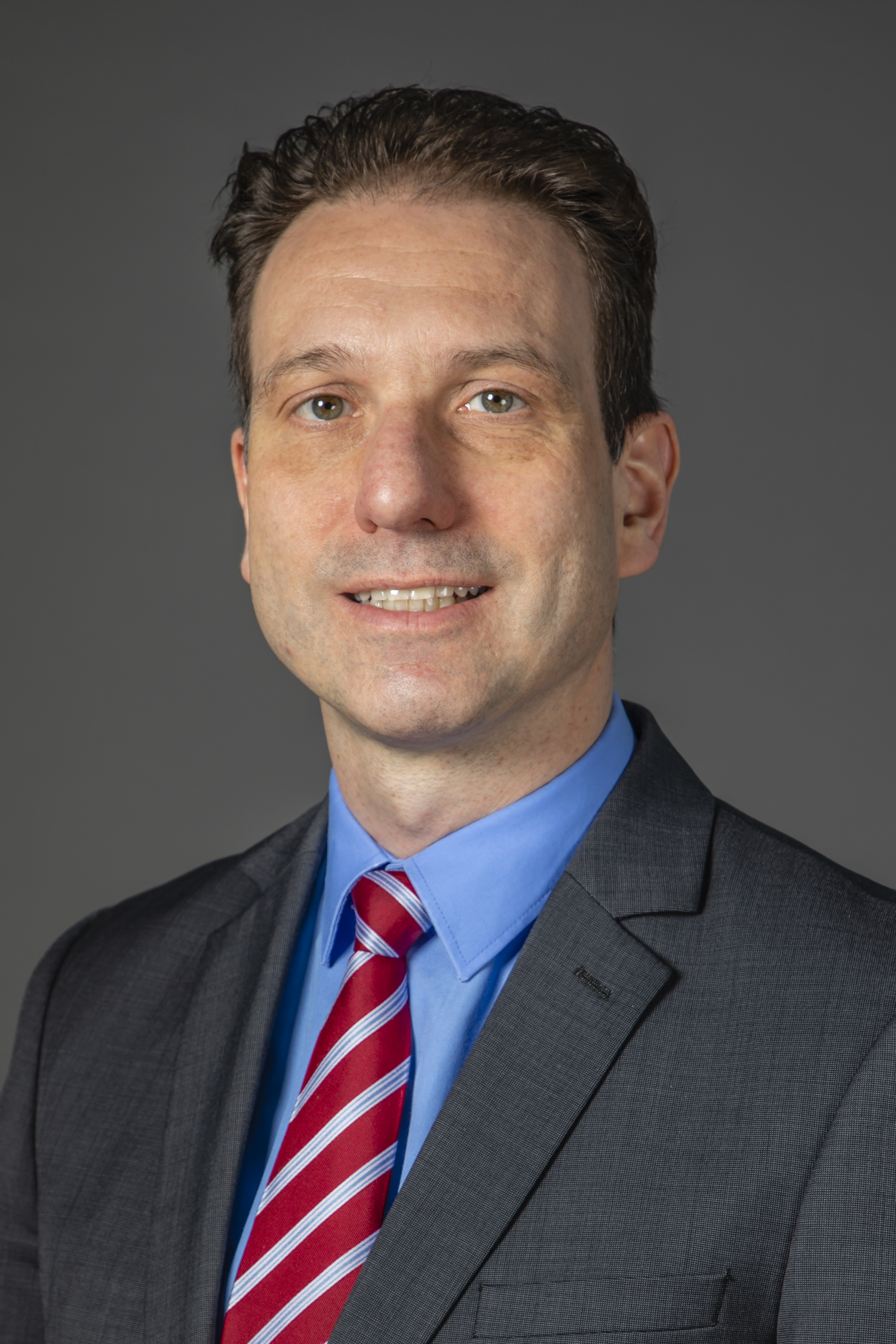
- Loose in 2019

Member of the Landtag of North Rhine-Westphalia
- Incumbent
- Assumed office 1 June 2017

Personal details
- Born: 11 October 1975 (age 50) Ibbenbüren
- Party: Alternative for Germany (since 2013)

Christian Loose (born 11 October 1975 in Ibbenbüren) is a German politician serving as a member of the Landtag of North Rhine-Westphalia since 2017. He has served as chairman of the Alternative for Germany in Bochum since 2022.
