= Ingrid Remmers =

German politician (1965–2021)

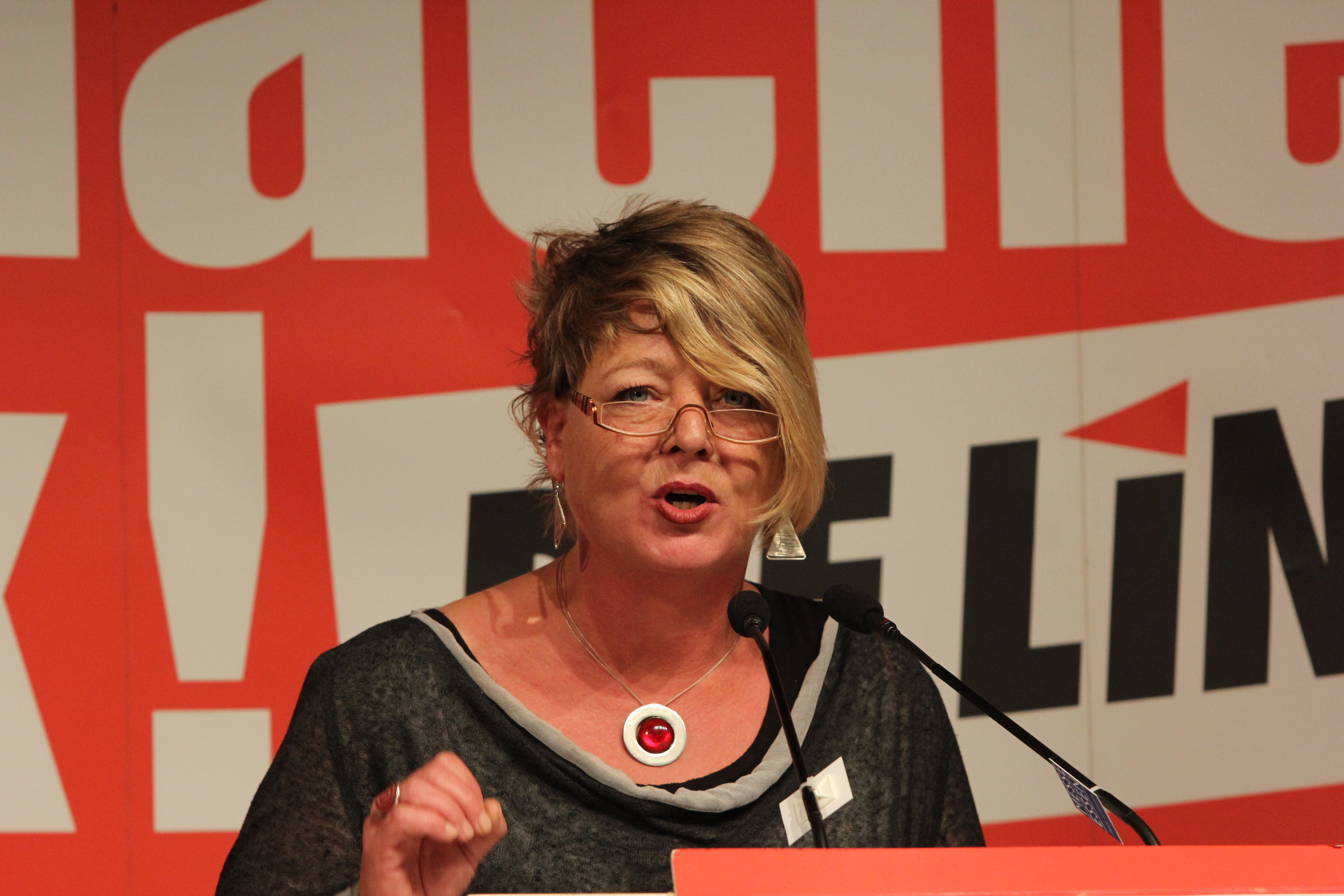
- Remmers in 2013

Member of the Bundestag
- In office 14 October 2017 – 9 August 2021

Personal details
- Born: 26 March 1965 Ibbenbüren, North Rhine-Westphalia, West Germany (now Germany)
- Died: 9 August 2021 (aged 56)
- Party: The Left

Ingrid Remmers (26 March 1965 – 9 August 2021) was a German politician. She represented The Left and served as a member of the Bundestag from the state of North Rhine-Westphalia from 2009 until 2013 and from 2017 until her death in 2021.

== Life ==
Ingrid Remmers was born in Ibbenbüren, North Rhine-Westphalia. She attended the Bodelschwingh secondary school in Ibbenbüren. She then trained as an office administrator at a newspaper publisher and then worked as a production assistant at a supplier to the Bochum site of the Opel car company. Remmers began her second educational path at the Comenius College in Mettingen. There Remmers completed her A-levels and then studied social sciences at the Ruhr University in Bochum from 1993 in the field of economics and associations. She was a member of the Bundestag from 2009 to 2013. She became member of the bundestag after the 2017 German federal election. She was a member of the Committee on Transport and Digital Infrastructure.

Remmers died on 9 August 2021, aged 56.
