= Jan-Niclas Gesenhues =

German politician (born 1990)

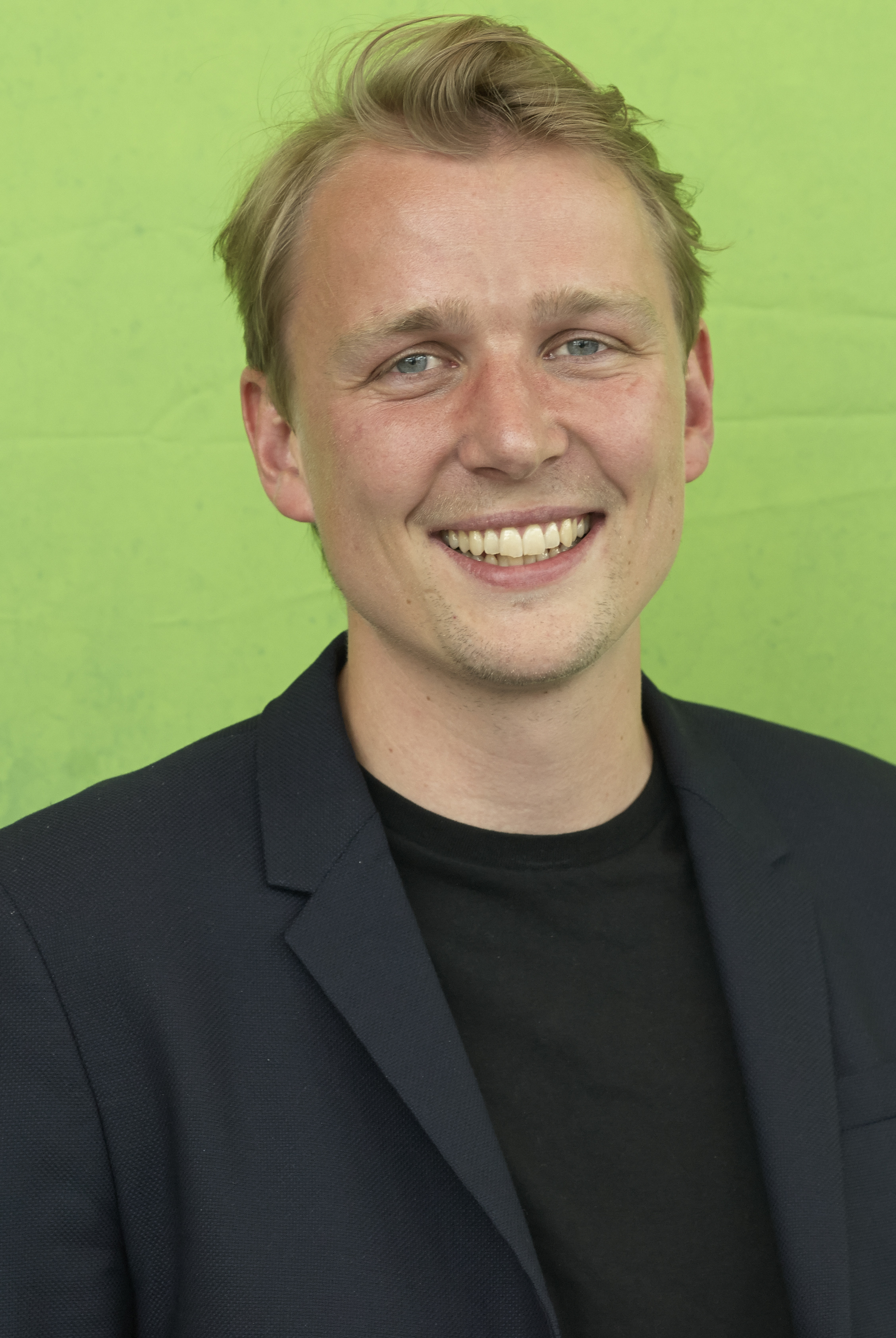
- Gesenhues in 2018

Member of the Bundestag
- Incumbent
- Assumed office 26 October 2021
- Constituency: North Rhine-Westphalia

Personal details
- Born: 12 February 1990 (age 36) Karlsruhe, Germany
- Party: Alliance 90/The Greens
- Education: University of Münster

Jan-Niclas Gesenhues (born 12 February 1990) is a German economist and politician of the Alliance 90/The Greens who has been serving as a member of the Bundestag since the 2021 elections.

In addition to his parliamentary work, Gesenhues served as Parliamentary State Secretary at the Federal Ministry for the Environment, Nature Conservation, Nuclear Safety and Consumer Protection in the coalition government of Chancellor Olaf Scholz from 2024 to 2025.

== Life ==
Gesenhues was born in Karlsruhe, but lives in Emsdetten. There, he graduated from Gymnasium Martinum and completed a voluntary social year in Mozambique. He then studied economics at the University of Münster, with a focus on resource and environmental economics, graduating with a master's degree. He then completed his doctorate on the topic of "Smart Energy in Mozambique. Drivers, Barriers and Options." at the University of Münster, and completed his doctorate in 2020. From 2019 until his entry into the Bundestag in September 2021, he worked as Head of International Affairs at the Steinfurt-Warendorf District Craftsmen's Association.

== Political career ==
Gesenhues has been a member of the Bundestag since 2021, representing the Steinfurt III district. In parliament, he initially served on the Committee on the Environment, Nature Conservation, Nuclear Safety and Consumer Protection and the Committee on Economic Cooperation and Development.

In February 2024, he was appointed Parliamentary State Secretary in the Federal Ministry for the Environment, Nature Conservation, Nuclear Safety and Consumer Protection in the coalition government of Chancellor Olaf Scholz to succeed his predecessor Christian Kühn.

In the negotiations to form a coalition government of the Christian Democratic Union (CDU) and the Green Party under Minister-President of North Rhine-Westphalia Hendrik Wüst following the 2022 state elections, Gesenhues and Norwich Rüße led their party's delegation in the working group on the environment, agriculture and consumer protection; their counterparts from the CDU were Peter Liese and Patricia Peill.

== Other activities ==
- German Institute for Development Evaluation (DEval), Member of the advisory board (2022–2024)
