= Ibbenbüren train collision =

2015 German passenger train collision

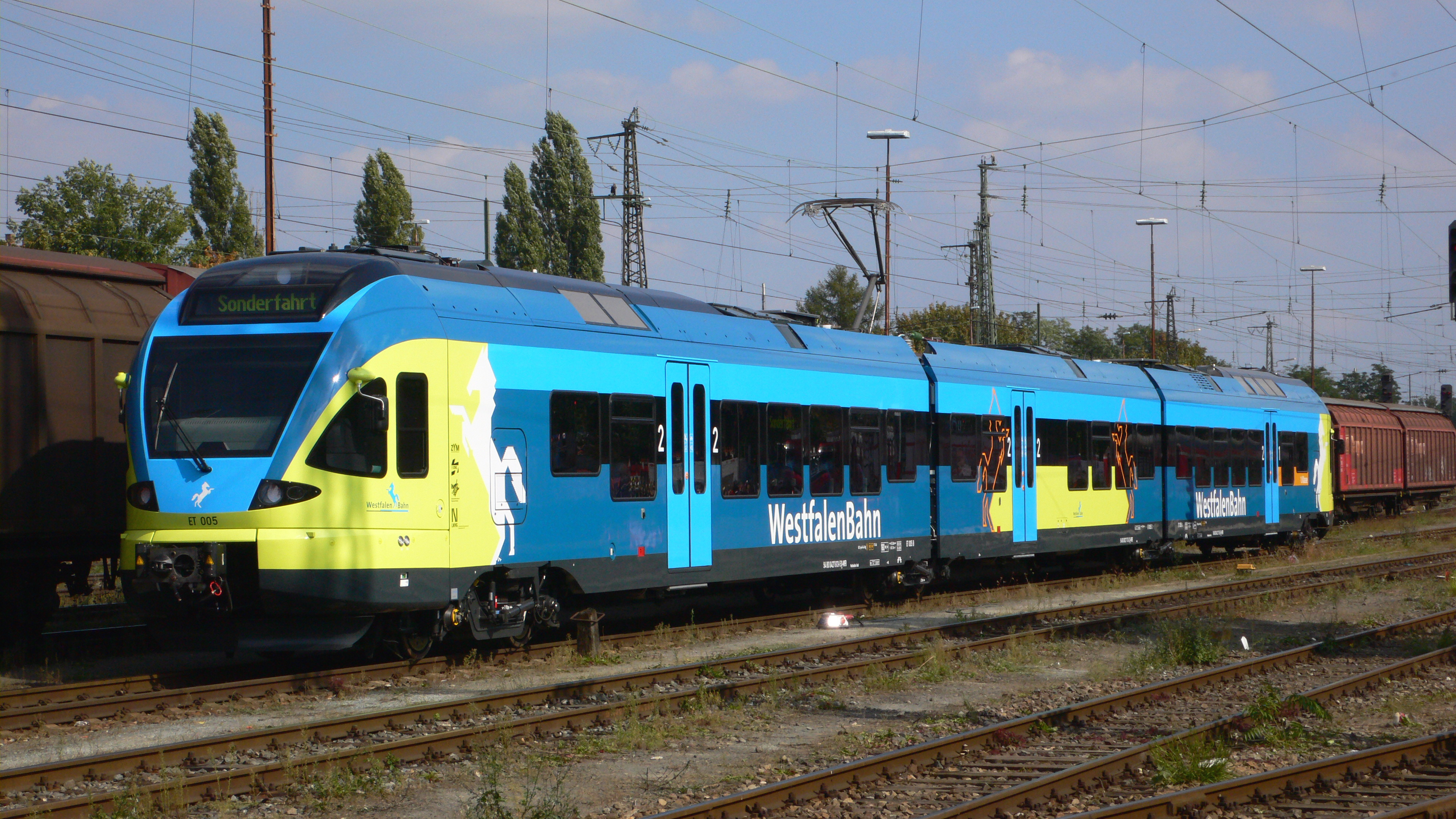
- A WestfalenBahn Stadler FLIRT train was involved in the accident

Details
- Date: 16 May 2015; 11:31 CEST (09:31 UTC)
- Location: Ibbenbüren, North Rhine-Westphalia
- Country: Germany
- Line: Löhne–Rheine railway
- Operator: WestfalenBahn
- Incident type: Collision with road vehicle
- Cause: Vehicle obstructing line

Statistics
- Trains: 1
- Passengers: 43
- Crew: 2
- Deaths: 2
- Injured: 41

On 16 May 2015, a passenger train collided with a tractor and trailer obstructing a level crossing at Ibbenbüren, North Rhine-Westphalia, Germany. Two people were killed and 41 were injured.

== Accident ==
At 11:31 CEST (09:31 UTC), a WestfalenBahn passenger train travelling from Osnabrück was in collision with a tractor and trailer that were obstructing a level crossing at Ibbenbüren, North Rhine-Westphalia, Germany. It was reported that the tractor and trailer, which contained liquid manure, became stuck on the level crossing. Extensive damage was caused to the front and side of the leading carriage of the train, which was a Stadler FLIRT electric multiple unit. It came to a halt 200 metres (220 yd) past the level crossing. The train was travelling at around 100 kilometres per hour (62 mph) when it collided with the tractor and trailer.

Two people were killed and 41 were injured, six seriously. Most of the injured were treated for shock. One of those killed was a passenger. The train driver was the other fatality. Passengers from the train were taken to a nearby community centre. Following the accident, a substitute bus service was put in place between Bielefeld and Ibbenbüren. The damaged train was removed to a depot at Rheine. The line through Ibbenbüren reopened on 17 May.

== Investigation ==
The tractor driver faced charges of negligent homicide and causing actual bodily harm by negligence.
