= Bernhard Bergmeyer =

German politician (1897–1987)

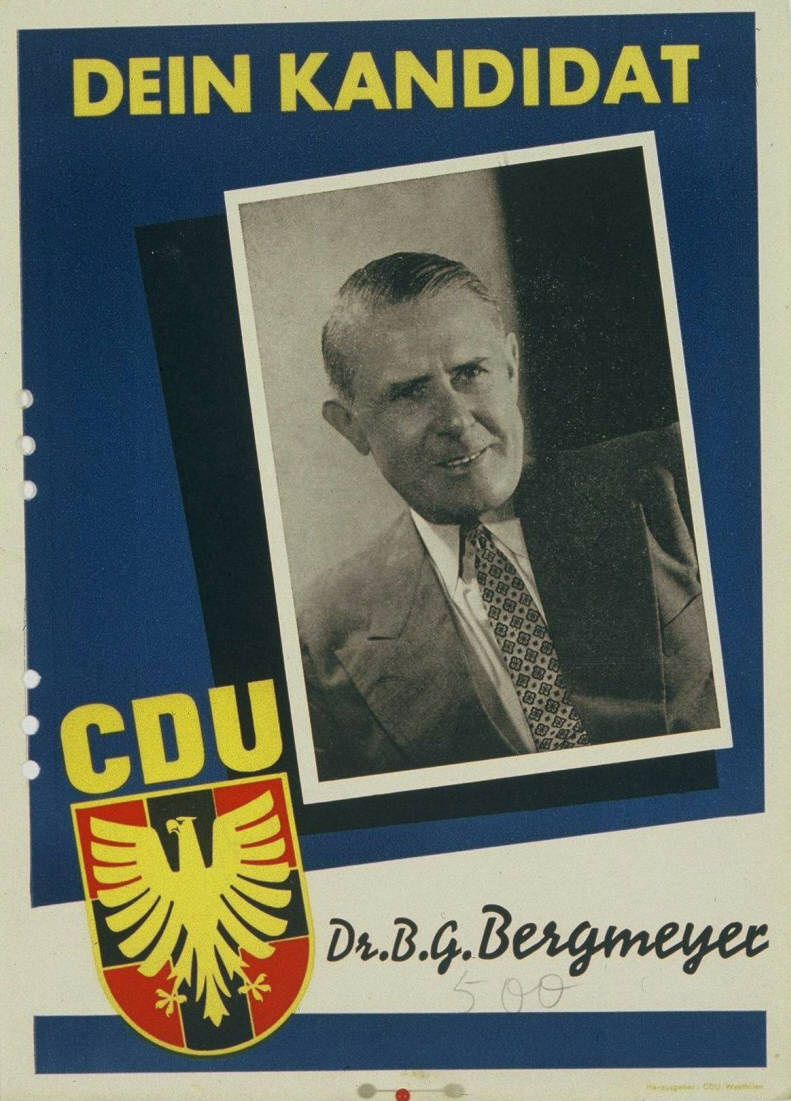
- Bernhard Gerhard Bergmeyer on an election poster for the 1957 federal elections

Member of the Bundestag
- In office 6 October 1953 – 15 October 1961

Personal details
- Born: 22 June 1897 Ibbenbüren, German Empire
- Died: 2 March 1987 (aged 89) Löningen, Germany
- Party: CDU

Bernhard Bergmeyer (22 June 1897 – 2 March 1987) was a German politician of the Christian Democratic Union (CDU) and former member of the German Bundestag.

== Life ==
In 1949, he was appointed professor of economics at the American University of Notre Dame, but returned to Germany in 1951 to take over the management of Honselwerke AG in Meschede.

From 1953 to 1961, Bergmeyer, who had joined the CDU in 1953, was a member of the German Bundestag.

== Literature ==
Herbst, Ludolf; Jahn, Bruno (2002). Vierhaus, Rudolf (ed.). Biographisches Handbuch der Mitglieder des Deutschen Bundestages. 1949–2002 [Biographical Handbook of the Members of the German Bundestag. 1949–2002] (in German). München: De Gruyter - De Gruyter Saur. p. 1715. ISBN 978-3-11-184511-1.
