= European Ideas Network =

Open think tank

The European Ideas Network
- Abbreviation: EIN
- Formation: 2002
- Type: Think tank
- Headquarters: 60, rue Wiertz
- Location: Brussels, Belgium
- President: Paulo Rangel (EP MEP)
- Website: ein.eu

The European Ideas Network (EIN) is an open think tank sponsored by the European People's Party Group and based in the European Parliament in Brussels.

The EIN works as a pan-European policy framework designed to promote new thinking on key challenges facing the countries of the European Union. With an active membership of around 3,000 policy-makers and opinion-shapers across the European Union, the EIN brings together leading MEPs, politicians from EU member states, businessmen, academics, policy advisers, think-tankers, journalists, representatives of civil society who share a common Europe-wide outlook, and non-party experts and commentators interested in the public issues being addressed. The network offers a forum in which to develop European policy.

== History ==
The European Ideas Network was launched in the summer of 2002 with the active support of the European People's Party Group and under the chairmanship of James Elles. It is prominent in centre-right European politics. The current and third chairman of the EIN is Paulo Rangel, who succeeded Jaime Mayor Oreja. Its director is Guillermo Martínez Casañ.

The network has been steadily expanding its area of activity since 2002, mostly notably through its annual Summer University. It initially had eight working groups in 2002 covering: the implications of globalisation and demographic change; the promotion of democracy and accountability in the EU; how to create jobs in Europe; the role of the private sector in providing public services; the crises in farming and food safety; the sustainability of EMU; and defence and security in the post-11 September world. The amount of working groups were increased to ten between 2003 and 2005, and to twelve between 2006 and 2013.

The European Ideas Network has been featured in "Global Go Think Tanks Index Report" under "Best Party Affiliated Think Tanks" for 4 consecutive years. Its name was first mentioned in the Index in 2010, as it ranked 20th amongst its peers. It consecutively ranked 16th in 2011, 13th in 2012, and lastly 9th in 2013.

Today, the think-tanks and foundations work together in joint task forces and working groups on areas of common interest. Recent task-force and working group titles have included: The Ways out of the crisis; Financial Regulation and Financial Market Stability; Social Market Economy; Energy and Environment; Research and Innovation; European Demographic Challenge – Immigration and family policies; Values and Personal Attitudes; European Governance – Facing ongoing political and social challenges in the EU member states; Making Europe A Safer Place; Neighborhood Policies – Eastern Partnership and Enlargement; Transatlantic Relations; Globalization and International Trade; Digital Economy; Common Agriculture Policy.

The network, which is placed on the centre-right of the political spectrum, also launched a unique parliamentary initiative which is called "The Transatlantic Parliamentary Group on Counter Terrorism" (TAG) in 2008. Initially aimed to create a dialogue platform within the West and throughout liberal democracies to assess the international security situation and the challenges of defense and national security produced by the Jihadist terrorism aimed at many countries around the world, TAG today brings together a variety of legislators from EU, US, and Canada to cooperate on a wide range of issues that are deemed important to the transatlantic partners. The co-chairs of TAG are Paulo Rangel for Europe and Congressman Jeff Duncan for the US; the co-secretaries generals are Guillermo Martínez Casañ and Walid Phares.

Currently 264 organizations are either directly or indirectly associated with the European Ideas Network. The EIN is the organization in charge of coordinating the joint activities for the entire network.

== Framework ==
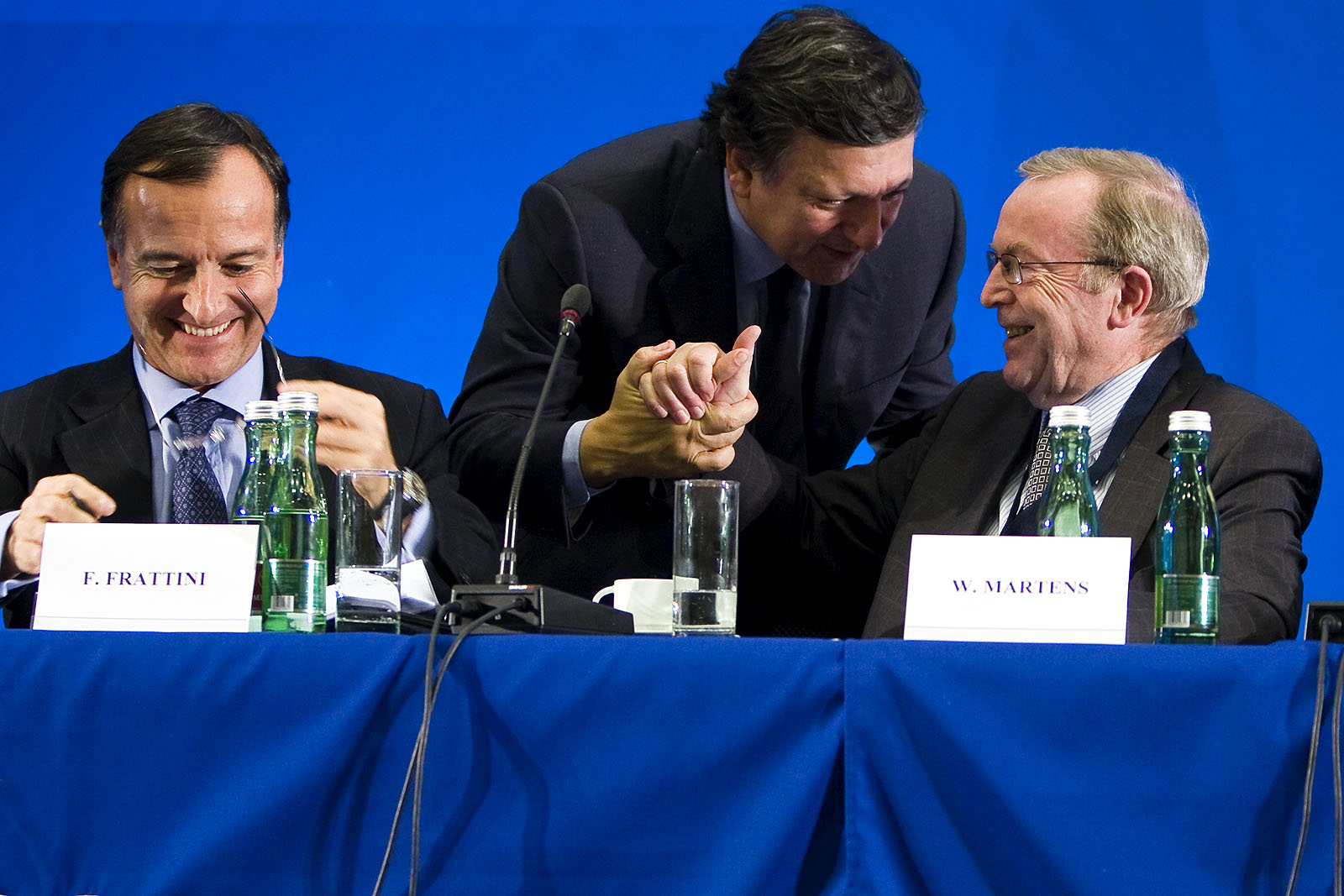
Jaime Mayor Oreja (l) and Wilfried Martens in 2009

The European Ideas Network engages in a variety of activities including seminars and working breakfasts, most notably in the annual "Summer University," to achieve and promote its goals in accordance with the principles outlined under its current policy guidelines. The Summer University is a comprehensive annual gathering that brings together over 450 experts and attendants across the European continent and the globe, including: MEPs, ministers, journalists, EIN network members, academics and other experts, speakers, EPP Group staff, as well as the European Parliament staff. Among the members are figures such as Carl Bildt, former Swedish Prime Minister and current Foreign Minister, Lech Wałęsa, Polish president and Nobel Peace Prize, Jacques Santer, former President of Luxembourg and the European Commission and Wilfried Martens, former Belgian Prime Minister and President of the European People's Party.

The European Ideas Network aims to:

- Promote new ideas and exchange best practice on how to address the social, economic and foreign policy challenges facing Europe today;
- Broaden the vision and experience of policy-makers and opinion-shapers, so that issues are seen in a wider, more global context;
- Operate on a deliberately Europe-wide basis, to allow access to and exchange of thinking not always available in a national setting;
- Strengthen the collective intellectual resources of, and improve the quality of policy-making within, centre-right politics in Europe;
- Involve centre-right think tanks and political foundations more closely in the evolution of policy and offer them a framework in which to cooperate more effectively at European level;
- Reach out to people and groups not otherwise involved in party politics, especially by encouraging the younger generation to participate in political argument and debate;
- Organise conferences and seminars across Europe, backed up by a conscious strategy of exploiting new technology to promote the exchange of ideas.
- Instigating further collaboration on the "Transatlantic Parliamentary Group on Counter Terrorism," an EIN initiative that aims to create a dialogue platform within the West and throughout liberal democracies.

== See also ==
- List of Christian democratic parties
