= Kathrin Vogler =

German politician

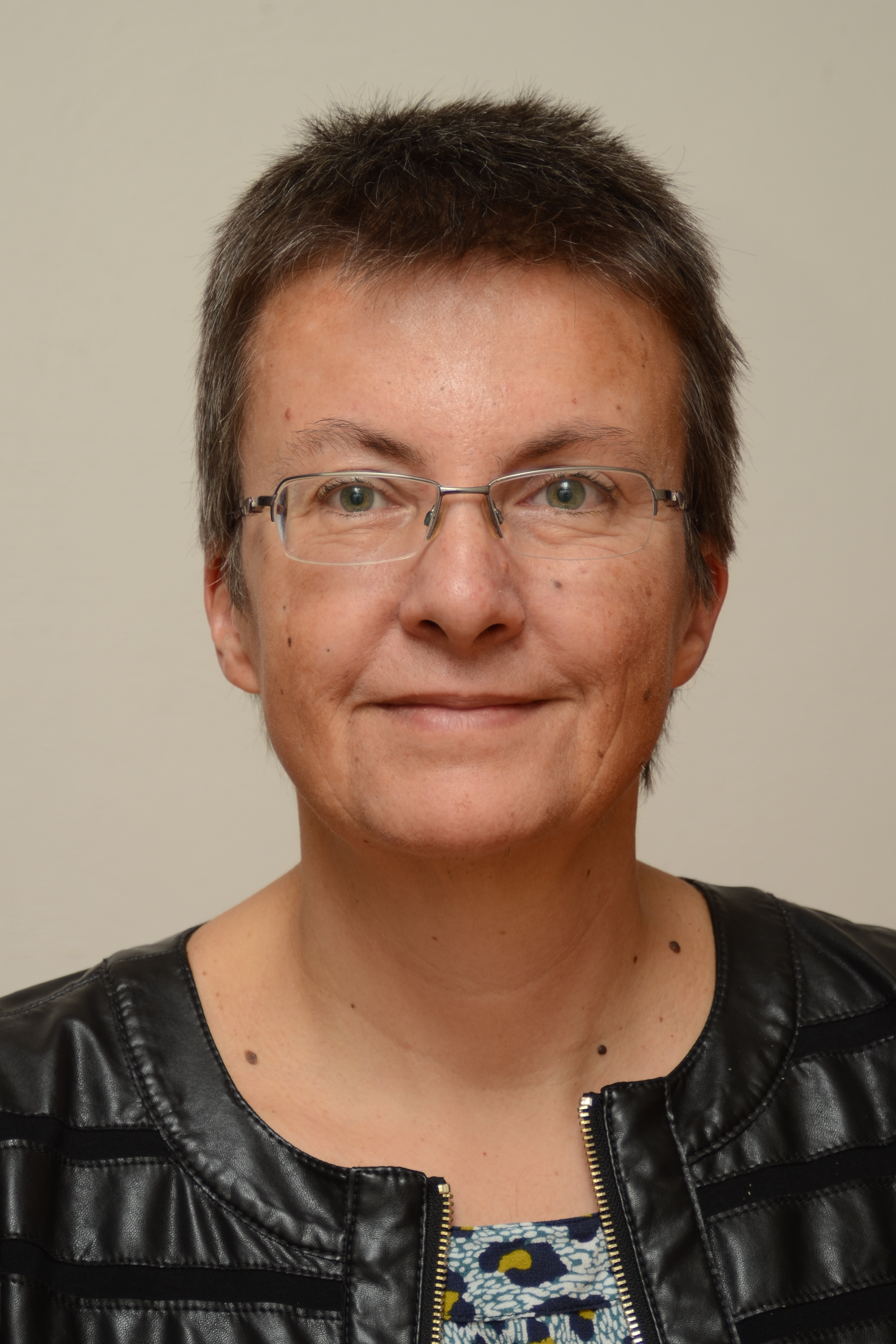
- Vogler in 2009

Member of the Bundestag
- Incumbent
- Assumed office 2009

Personal details
- Born: 29 September 1963 (age 62) München, West Germany (now Germany)
- Party: The Left

Kathrin Vogler (born 29 September 1963) is a German politician. She represents The Left and has served as a member of the Bundestag from the state of North Rhine-Westphalia since 2009.

== Life ==
Vogler was born in Munich, Bavaria. became member of the Bundestag after the 2009 German federal election. She is a member of the Foreign Affairs Committee.
