= Ibbenbüren =

Ibbenbüren Ippenbürn (Low German)
- Town
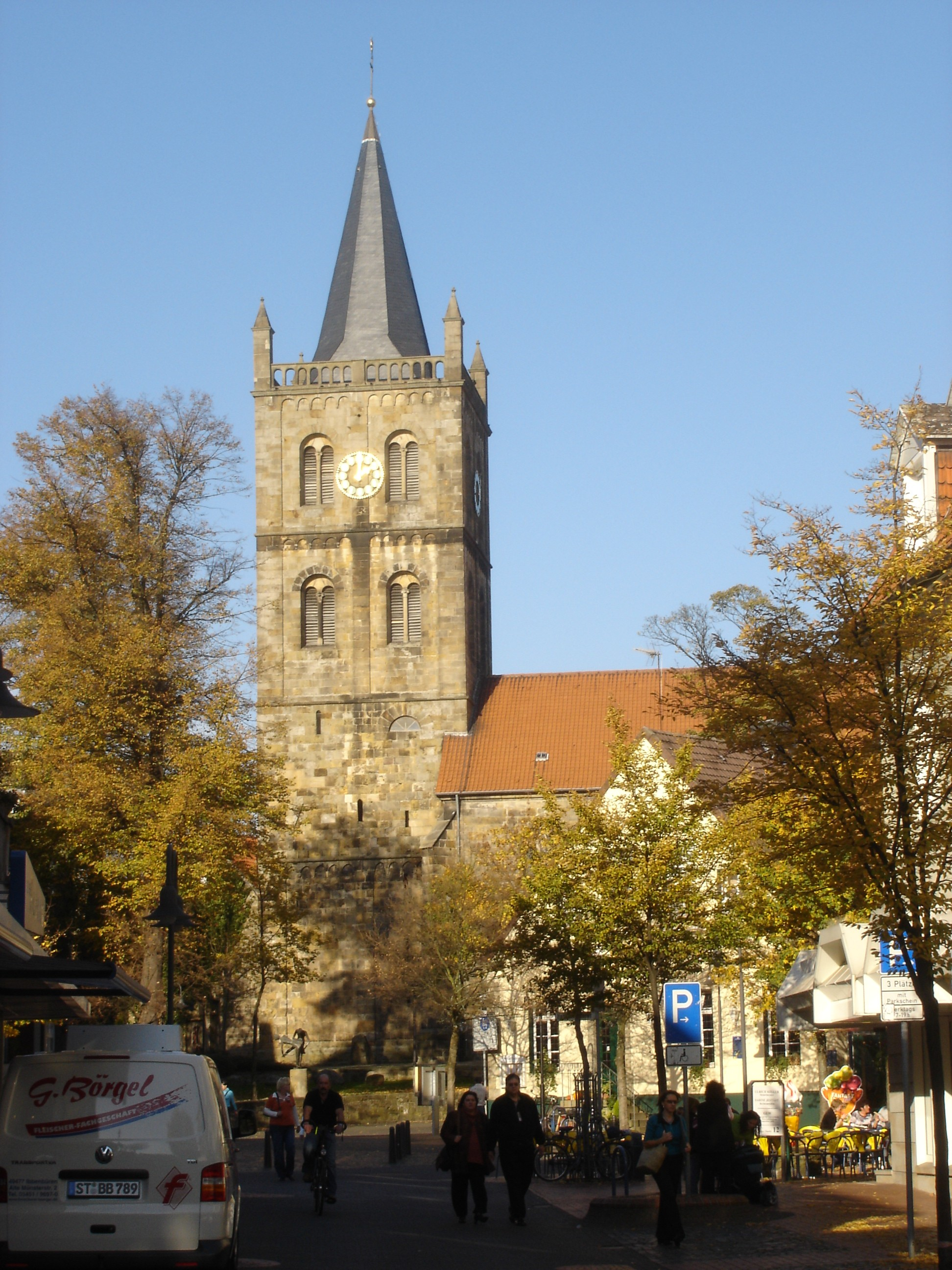
- Christ Church, Ibbenbüren

- Coat of arms

- Location of Ibbenbüren within Steinfurt district
- Interactive map of Ibbenbüren
- Location within Germany Location within North Rhine-Westphalia
- Coordinates: 52°16′40″N 7°43′00″E
- Country: Germany
- State: North Rhine-Westphalia
- Admin. region: Münster
- District: Steinfurt
- Subdivisions: 9

Government
  - Mayor (2020–25): Marc Schrameyer (SPD)

Area
  - Total: 108.87 km^{2} (42.03 sq mi)
- Elevation: 64 m (210 ft)

Population (2025-12-31)
  - Total: 51,596
  - Density: 473.92/km^{2} (1,227.5/sq mi)
- Time zone: UTC+01:00 (CET)
  - Summer (DST): UTC+02:00 (CEST)
- Postal codes: 49477, 49479
- Dialling codes: 05451, 05459 (Uffeln), 05455 (Dörenthe)
- Vehicle registration: ST, TE, BF
- Website: www.ibbenbueren.de

Ibbenbüren (German pronunciation: [ɪbn̩ˈbyːʁən]; Westphalian: Ippenbürn) is a town in the district of Steinfurt, in North Rhine-Westphalia, Germany.

== Geography ==
Ibbenbüren is on the Ibbenbürener Aa river at the northwest end of the Teutoburger forest, between the two cities Rheine in the west and Osnabrück in the east, both approximately 20 km away.

== History ==
Ibbenbüren is mentioned in documentary evidence for the first time in 1146 when the bishop of Osnabrück at that time, Philipp of Katzenelnbogen, donated a tenth of his possessions in Ibbenbüren to the Getrudenkloster of Osnabrück. Although Ibbenbüren was already much older and a document of the year 1348 mentions the establishment of a church in the year 799, though the year 1146 is officially considered as the year of the foundation of Ibbenbüren.

In the years 1219 and/or 1234 it appears as a church village. In the transition from the High Middle Ages to the Late Middle Ages the noble gentlemen of Ibbenbüren, that is the abbot of Herford and the counts of Tecklenburg, possessed basic rule of the place. At this time Ibbenbüren belonged to the Diocese of Osnabrück. During this time the castle of Ibbenbüren was built by the noble gentlemen of Ibbenbüren starting from 1150. The last remains of this castle are the remnants of the heath tower in the proximity of the Aasee.

After the noble gentleman of Ibbenbüren died out, Ibbenbüren came under the exclusive rule of the counts of Tecklenburg. This rule lasted until the end of the 15th or beginning of the 16th century, when Ibbenbüren finally fell into the possession of Charles V in 1548 by awkward and luckless tactics used by the counts of Tecklenburg. Karl donated it to his sister Mary of Habsburg, governor of the Netherlands. Ibbenbüren was assigned to the County of Lingen. Into this period also falls the beginning of coal mining.

After Ibbenbüren repeatedly fell under control of the Netherlands and Spain in the Dutch Revolt, it was assigned to the House of Orange-Nassau after the Peace of Westphalia in 1648. Around this time was the beginning of iron ore mining in and around Ibbenbüren, which ended in the first half of the 19th century. By succession it came under Prussian rule in 1702. On 1 February 1724 Ibbenbüren attained municipal rights, which stood among other things in connection with the introduction of excise duty. In 1743 the first magistrate and mayor were appointed.

During the rule of Napoleon Bonaparte at the beginning of the 19th century, Ibbenbüren belonged to the First French Empire, until it was freed by Prussian and Russian troops in 1815. It came back under Prussian rule on 1 January 1816, and was assigned to the district of Tecklenburg. After the end of World War II the city Ibbenbüren and the municipality Ibbenbüren Land were formed on 31 December 1974, into the department federation Ibbenbüren, resulting in today's city of Ibbenbüren. With the simultaneous dissolution of the district of Tecklenburg and fusion with the old district of Burgsteinfurt, Ibbenbüren was assigned to the new district of Steinfurt.

On 16 May 2015, a passenger train collided with a vehicle on a level crossing at Ibbenbüren. Two people were killed and 20 were injured, three seriously.

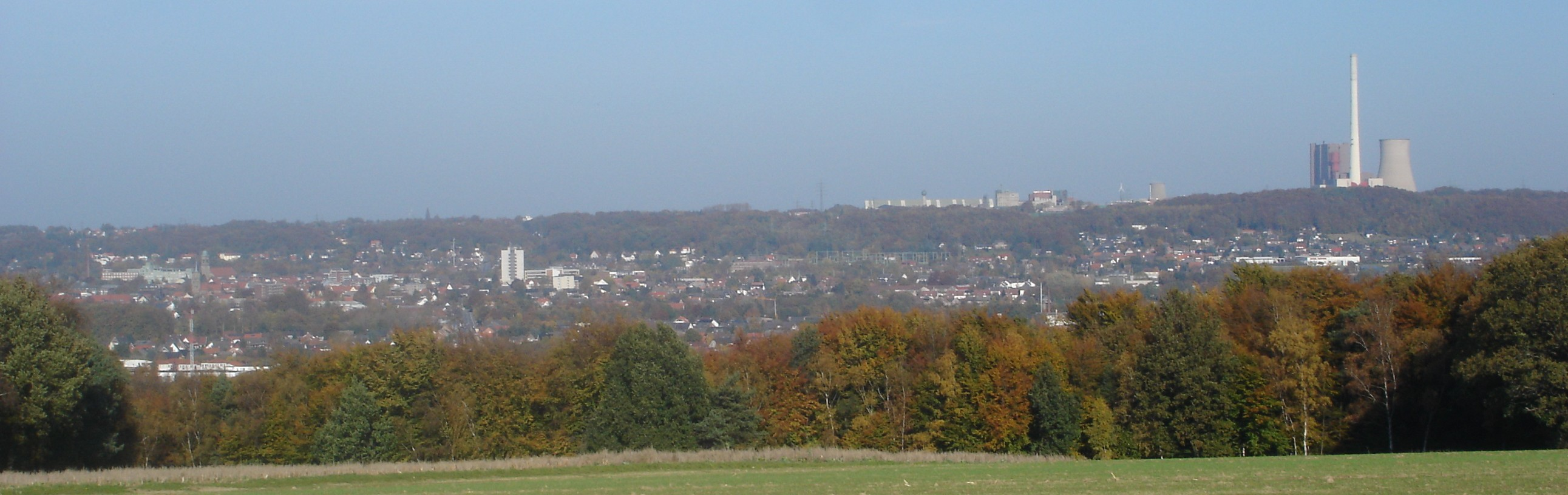
Panorama shot of the city centre of Ibbenbüren and the mountain "Dörenther Berg". In the background on the "Schafberg" one can recognize the mine plants as well as the Ibbenbüren power station.

== Population ==
Historical population

| Year | Pop. | ±% p.a. |
|---|---|---|
| 1965 | 39,456 | — |
| 1970 | 41,266 | +0.90% |
| 1975 | 42,197 | +0.45% |
| 1980 | 42,323 | +0.06% |
| 1985 | 42,456 | +0.06% |
| 1990 | 44,643 | +1.01% |
| 1995 | 47,421 | +1.21% |

| Year | Pop. | ±% p.a. |
|---|---|---|
| 2000 | 48,843 | +0.59% |
| 2005 | 51,010 | +0.87% |
| 2010 | 51,522 | +0.20% |
| 2015 | 50,935 | −0.23% |
| 2020 | 51,526 | +0.23% |
| 2025 | 51,596 | +0.03% |

Source: Landesdatabank Nordrhein-Westfalen

== Coat of arms ==
Coat of arms displays an upright golden anchor on a blue shield. The colours blue and gold represent the city colours. The origin of the anchor is not known, but the anchor is also on the coat of arms of the neighbouring earldom of Lingen, which has a harbour. The anchor could depict the port customs office, which was owned by the earl.

== Transport ==
The town has three stations on the Löhne–Rheine railway, those being Ibbenbüren Central (Hauptbahnhof), Ibbenbüren Laggenbeck, and Ibbenbüren Esch, and provides connections to Osnabrück and Bielefeld.

== Twin towns – sister cities ==
Ibbenbüren is twinned with:

- Dessau-Roßlau, Germany
- Gourdon, France
- Hellendoorn, Netherlands
- Jastrzębie-Zdrój, Poland
- Prievidza, Slovakia

== Mayors ==
- since 2015: Marc Schrameyer (SPD)
- 2004–2015 Heinz Steingröver (SPD)
- 1999–2004 Otto Lohmann
- 1992–1999 Ewald Bolsmann (SPD)
- 1984–1992 Heinz Unland (SPD)
- 1975–1984 Albert Remke (CDU)
- 1 January – 31 May 1975 Heinrich Merge (CDU)
- 1964–1974 Heinrich Eickelmann (CDU)
- 1961–1964 Franz Falke (CDU)
- 1952–1961 August Wiesmann (SPD)
- 1948–1952 Franz Remke (CDU)
- 1946–1948 Andreas Horstmann (Zentrum)
- 1922–1945 Rudolf Müller (NSDAP)
- 1921–1922 Mohrmann, NN.
- 1914–1921 Eickhoff, NN.
- 1900–1914 Leopold von Eichstedt
- 1882–1900 Otto Emil Walther Dittrich
- 1876–1882 Reinhard, NN.
- 1872–1876 Rinteln, NN.
- 1834–1871 H. Ohm
- 1811–1834 Johan Friedrich Sporledder
- 1806–1811 Moritz Adolph Rump

== Notable people ==
- Ignatz Wiemeler (1895–1952), bookbinder and educator
- Bernhard Bergmeyer (1897–1987), politician (CDU)
- Hermann Gösmann (1904–1979), lawyer and football administrator
- Hermann Michel (1935–2015), football player and coach
- Ingrid Remmers (1965-2021), politician (The Left)
- Timo Dierkes (born 1967), actor
- Anja Karliczek (born 1971), politician (CDU)
- Tino Wenzel (born 1973), sport shooter
- Christian Loose (born 1975), politician
- Kerstin Garefrekes (born 1979), footballer
- Christine Wenzel (née Brinker) (born 1981), skeet shooter, Olympic medalist
- Simon Rolfes (born 1982), footballer
- Lars Unnerstall (born 1990), footballer
- Marius Bülter (born 1993), footballer
- Sebastian Klaas (born 1998), footballer
