= European People's Party Group =

Centre-right political group of the European Parliament

- European Parliament group
- Name: European People's Party Group
- English abbr.: EPP Group; EPP (22 June 2009 – present) Older: EPP-ED (20 July 1999 – 22 June 2009); EPP (17 July 1979 – 20 July 1999); CD (23 June 1953 – 17 July 1979)
- French abbr.: PPE (22 June 2009 – present) Older: PPE-DE (20 July 1999 – 22 June 2009); PPE (17 July 1979 – 20 July 1999); DC (23 June 1953 – 17 July 1979)
- Formal name: Group of the European People's Party (Christian Democrats) (22 June 2009 – present) Older: Group of the European People's Party (Christian Democrats) and European Democrats (20 July 1999 – 22 June 2009); Group of the European People's Party (Christian-Democratic Group) (17 July 1979 – 20 July 1999); Christian Democratic Group (Group of the European People's Party) (14 March 1978 – 17 July 1979); Christian Democratic Group (23 June 1953 – 14 March 1978)
- Ideology: Christian democracy; Liberal conservatism; Pro-Europeanism
- Political position: Centre-right
- European parties: European People's Party (majority); European Christian Political Party (FAMILIE)
- From: 11 September 1952 (unofficially); 23 June 1953 (officially)
- To: Present
- Chaired by: Manfred Weber
- MEP(s): 185 / 720 (26%)
- Website: www.eppgroup.eu

The European People's Party Group (EPP Group or simply EPP) is a political group of the European Parliament consisting of deputies (MEPs) from the member parties of the European People's Party (EPP). Sometimes it also includes independent MEPs and/or deputies from unaffiliated national parties. The EPP Group comprises politicians of Christian democratic, conservative and liberal-conservative orientation.

The 2024 EPP manifesto reflects these views. The opening paragraph for instance reflects conservatism used to distinguish Europeans as a people "defined by shared history, heritage, Judea-Christian roots, and diversity." The manifesto refers to the history of Christian democracy and the invention of the social market economy, as evidence of their commitment to Christian ethics & social teaching. Also linked is an article dedicated to the EPP view on social market economies, where they state "We believe our Christian democratic values are the strongest starting point for designing the future because they combine the best from conservative, liberal, and Christian-social ways of thinking."

The European People's Party was officially founded as a European political party in 1976. However, the European People's Party Group in the European Parliament has existed in one form or another since June 1953, from the Common Assembly of the European Coal and Steel Community, making it one of the oldest European-level political groups. It has been the largest political group in the European Parliament since 1999.

== History ==
The Common Assembly of the European Coal and Steel Community (the predecessor of the present day European Parliament) first met on 10 September 1952 and the first Christian Democratic Group was unofficially formed the next day, with Maan Sassen as president. The group held 38 of the 78 seats, two short of an absolute majority. On 16 June 1953, the Common Assembly passed a resolution enabling the official formation of political groups; further, on 23 June 1953 the constituent declaration of the group was published and the group was officially formed.

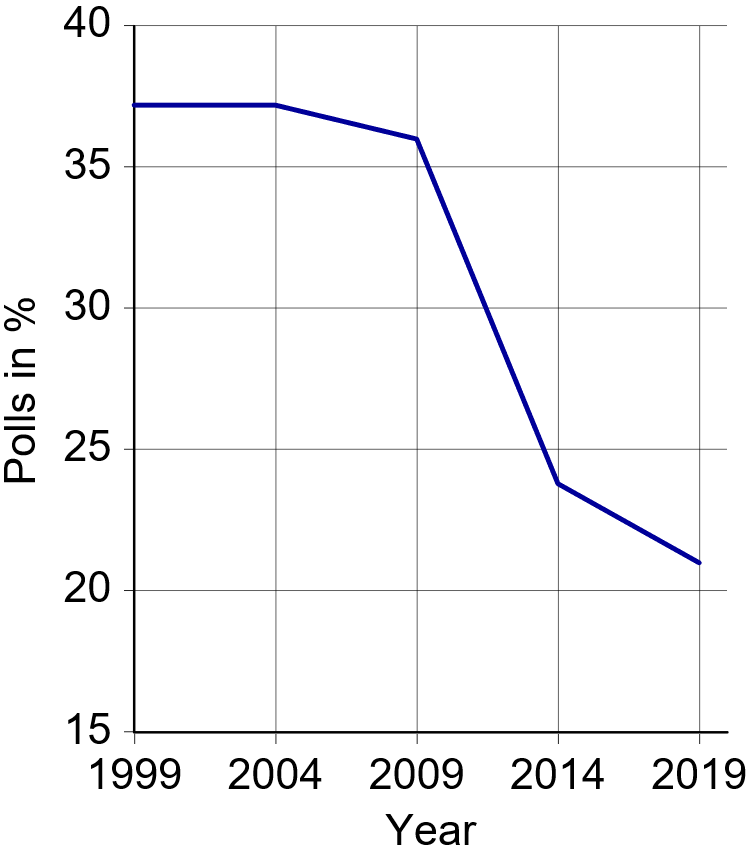
EPP share of votes in elections to the Eur. Parliament 1999–2019

The Christian Democrat group was the biggest group at formation, but as time wore on, it lost support and was the second-biggest group by the time of the 1979 elections. As the European Community expanded into the European Union, the dominant centre-right parties in the new member states were not necessarily Christian democratic, and the EPP (European People's Party, the pan-continental political party founded in 1976, to which all group members are now affiliated) feared being sidelined. To counter this, the EPP expanded its remit to cover the centre-right regardless of tradition and pursued a policy of integrating liberal-conservative parties.

This policy led to Greek New Democracy and Spanish People's Party MEPs joining the EPP Group. The British Conservative Party and Danish Conservative People's Party tried to maintain a group of their own, named the European Democrats (ED), but lack of support and the problems inherent in maintaining a small group forced ED's collapse in the 1990s, and its members crossed the floor to join the EPP Group. The parties of these MEPs also became full members of the EPP (with the exception of the British Conservative Party, which did not join) and this consolidation process of the European centre-right continued during the 1990s with the acquisition of members from the Italian party Forza Italia. However, the consolidation was not unalloyed and a split emerged with the Eurosceptic MEPs who congregated in a subgroup within the Group, also called the European Democrats (ED).

Nevertheless, the consolidation held through the 1990s, assisted by the group being renamed the European People's Party – European Democrats (EPP-ED) Group; after the 1999 European elections, the EPP-ED reclaimed its position as the largest group in the Parliament from the Party of European Socialists (PES) Group.

Size was not enough, however: the group did not have a majority. It continued therefore to engage in the Grand Coalition (a coalition with the PES Group, or occasionally the Liberals) to generate the majorities required by the cooperation procedure under the Single European Act.

Meanwhile, the parties in the European Democrats subgroup were growing restless, with the establishment in July 2006 of the Movement for European Reform, and finally left following the 2009 elections, when the Czech Civic Democratic Party and British Conservative Party formed their own right-wing European Conservatives and Reformists Group (ECR) group on 22 June 2009, abolishing the European Democrats subgroup from that date. The EPP-ED Group reverted to its original name – the EPP Group – immediately.

=== 7th European Parliament (2009) ===
In the 7th European Parliament, the EPP Group remained the largest parliamentary group with 275 MEPs. It is currently the only political group in the European parliament to fully represent its corresponding European political party, i.e. the European People's Party. The United Kingdom was the only member state to not be represented in the group; this state of affairs ceased temporarily on 28 February 2018, when two MEPs suspended from the British Conservative Party left the ECR Group and joined the EPP. The two MEPs later joined a breakaway political party in the UK, The Independent Group.

=== 8th European Parliament (2014) ===
Logo of European People's Party Group from 1999 to 2015

After twelve member parties in the EPP called for Hungary's Fidesz's expulsion or suspension, Fidesz's membership was suspended with a common agreement on 20 March 2019. The suspension was applied only to the EPP but not to its group in the Parliament. On 3 March 2021, Fidesz decided to leave the EPP group, after the group's new rules, however still kept their membership in the party. On 18 March 2021, Fidesz decided to leave the European People's Party.

=== 9th European Parliament (2019) ===
In the 9th European Parliament, the EPP won 182 seats out of a total of 751. They formed a coalition with Progressive Alliance of Socialists and Democrats and Renew Europe to elect Ursula von der Leyen as president of the European Commission.

=== 10th European Parliament (2024) ===
On June 18, 6 new parties joined the group, including the Hungarian Respect and Freedom Party (TISZA) and their 7 MEPs, the Dutch Farmer–Citizen Movement (BBB) and Czech Mayors and Independents (STAN), each with 2 MEPs, as well as the Danish Liberal Alliance, Dutch New Social Contract (NSC), and the German Family Party, each with 1 MEP. Combined, the group expanded by 14 MEPs.

Later that day, the Hungarian Christian Democratic People's Party (KDNP) announced their departure from the EPP Group, due to the admission of the Tisza Party.

On 19 June, the group re-elected Manfred Weber as chairman of the group, and the 10 vice-chairpersons.

== Membership at formation ==
The 38 members in the group on 11 September 1952 were as follows:

Member state	MEPs	Party	MEPs	Notes	Sources
Belgium	5	Christian Social Party	5	Théodore Lefevre; Paul Struye; Pierre Wigny; Pierre De Smet; Alfred Bertrand	
France	5	Christian People's Party (Saar)	2	Franz Singer; Erwin Mueller	
France	5	Republican People's Movement	3	François de Menthon; Pierre-Henri Teitgen; Alain Poher	
Germany	8	Christian Democratic Union and Christian Social Union	7	Günter Henle; Eugen Gerstenmaier; Heinrich von Brentano; Hermann Pünder; Franz Josef Strauss; Georg Pelster; Hermann Kopf	
Germany	8	Federal Union Party	1	Helmut Bertram	
Italy	12	Christian Democracy	12	Pietro Campilli; Antonio Azara; Lodovico Benvenuti; Mario Cingolani; Francesco Dominedo; Lodovico Montini; Angelo Giacomo Mott; Italo Mario Sacco; Vinicio Ziino; Giuseppe Togni; Antonio Boggiano-Pico; Armando Sabatini	
Luxembourg	2	Christian Social People's Party	2	Fernand Loesch; Nicolas Margue	
Netherlands	6	Anti-Revolutionary Party	2	J. A. H. J. S. Bruins Slot; W. Rip	
Netherlands	6	Catholic People's Party	3	M. A. M. Klompé; E. M. J. A. Sassen; P. A. Blaisse	
Netherlands	6	Christian Historical Union	1	G. Vixseboxe	

== Structure ==
=== Organisation ===
The EPP Group is governed by a collective (referred to as the Presidency) that allocates tasks. The Presidency consists of the Group Chair and a maximum of ten Vice-Chairs, including the Treasurer. The day-to-day running of the EPP Group is performed by its secretariat in the European Parliament, led by its Secretary-General. The Group runs its own think-tank, the European Ideas Network, which brings together opinion-formers from across Europe to discuss issues facing the European Union from a centre-right perspective.

The EPP Group Presidency includes:

Name	Position	Ref.
Manfred Weber	Chair	
François-Xavier Bellamy	Vice-chair	
Andrzej Halicki	Vice-chair	
Jeroen Lenaers	Vice-chair	
Dolors Montserrat	Vice-chair	
Siegfried Mureșan	Vice-chair	
Lídia Pereira	Vice-chair	
Massimiliano Salini	Vice-chair	
Tomas Tobé	Vice-chair	
Romana Tomc	Vice-chair	
Željana Zovko	Vice-chair	

The chairs of the group and its predecessors from 1952 to 2024 are as follows:

Chair	Took office	Left office	Country (Constituency)	Party
Maan Sassen	1953	1958	Netherlands	Catholic People's Party
Pierre Wigny	1958	1958	Belgium	Christian Social Party
Alain Poher	1958	1966	France	Popular Republican Movement
Joseph Illerhaus	1966	1969	West Germany	Christian Democratic Union
Hans Lücker	1969	1975	West Germany	Christian Democratic Union
Alfred Bertrand	1975	1977	Belgium	Christian People's Party
Egon Klepsch	1977	1982	West Germany	Christian Democratic Union
Paolo Barbi	1982	1984	Italy	Christian Democracy
Egon Klepsch	1984	1992	West Germany /Germany	Christian Democratic Union
Leo Tindemans	1992	1994	Belgium (Dutch)	Christian People's Party
Wilfried Martens	1994	1999	Belgium (Dutch)	Christian People's Party
Hans-Gert Pöttering	1999	2007	Germany	Christian Democratic Union
Joseph Daul	2007	2014	France (East)	Union for a Popular Movement
Manfred Weber	2014	present	Germany	Christian Social Union

== MEPs ==
=== 10th European Parliament ===
State	National party	European alliance	MEPs
Austria	Austrian People's Party; Österreichische Volkspartei (ÖVP)	EPP	5 / 20
Belgium	Christian Democratic and Flemish; Christen-Democratisch & Vlaams (CD&V)	EPP	2 / 22
Belgium	Christian Social Party; Christlich Soziale Partei (CSP)	None	1 / 22
Bulgaria	Citizens for European Development of Bulgaria; Граждани за европейско развитие на България (GERB)	EPP	4 / 17
Bulgaria	Union of Democratic Forces; Съюз на демократичните сили (SDS)	EPP	1 / 17
Bulgaria	Democrats for a Strong Bulgaria; Демократи за силна България (DSB)	EPP	1 / 17
Croatia	Croatian Democratic Union; Hrvatska demokratska zajednica (HDZ)	EPP	6 / 12
Cyprus	Democratic Rally; Δημοκρατικός Συναγερμός (DISY)	EPP	2 / 6
Czech Republic	TOP 09; TOP 09	EPP	2 / 21
Czech Republic	Mayors and Independents; Starostové a nezávislí (STAN)	None	2 / 21
Czech Republic	Christian and Democratic Union – Czechoslovak People's Party; Křesťanská a demokratická unie – Československá strana lidová (KDU–ČSL)	EPP	1 / 21
Denmark	Conservative People's Party; Konservative Folkeparti (C)	EPP	1 / 15
Denmark	Liberal Alliance; Liberal Alliance (I)	None	1 / 15
Estonia	Fatherland; Isamaa	EPP	2 / 7
Finland	National Coalition Party; Kansallinen Kokoomus (KK)	EPP	4 / 15
France	The Republicans; Les Républicains (LR)	EPP	5 / 81
Germany	Christian Democratic Union; Christlich Demokratische Union Deutschlands (CDU)	EPP	23 / 96
Germany	Christian Social Union in Bavaria; Christlich-Soziale Union in Bayern e.V. (CSU)	EPP	6 / 96
Germany	Ecological Democratic Party; Ökologisch-Demokratische Partei (ÖDP)	EFA individual member (Note: Manuela Ripa is an individual member of EFA.)	1 / 96
Germany	Family Party of Germany; Familienpartei Deutschlands (FAMILIE)	ECPP	1 / 96
Greece	New Democracy; Νέα Δημοκρατία (ND)	EPP	7 / 21
Hungary	Respect and Freedom Party; Tisztelet és Szabadság Párt (Tisza)	None	7 / 21
Ireland	Fine Gael; Fine Gael (FG)	EPP	4 / 14
Italy	Forward Italy; Forza Italia (FI)	EPP	8 / 76
Italy	South Tyrolean People's Party; Südtiroler Volkspartei (SVP)	EPP	1 / 76
Latvia	New Unity; Jaunā Vienotība (JV)	EPP	2 / 9
Lithuania	Homeland Union – Lithuanian Christian Democrats; Tėvynės sąjunga – Lietuvos krikščionys demokratai (TS-LKD)	EPP	3 / 11
Luxembourg	Christian Social People's Party; Chrëschtlech Sozial Vollekspartei (CSV)	EPP	2 / 6
Malta	Nationalist Party; Partit Nazzjonalista (PN)	EPP	3 / 6
Netherlands	Christian Democratic Appeal; Christen-Democratisch Appèl (CDA)	EPP	3 / 31
Netherlands	New Social Contract; Nieuw Sociaal Contract (NSC)	None	1 / 31
Poland	Civic Coalition; Koalicja Obywatelska (KO)	EPP	21 / 53
Poland	Polish People's Party; Polskie Stronnictwo Ludowe (PSL)	EPP	2 / 53
Portugal	Social Democratic Party; Partido Social Democrata (PPD/PSD)	EPP	6 / 21
Portugal	Democratic and Social Centre - People's Party; Centro Democrático e Social - Partido Popular (CDS–PP)	EPP	1 / 21
Romania	National Liberal Party; Partidul Național Liberal (PNL)	EPP	8 / 33
Romania	Democratic Alliance of Hungarians in Romania; Romániai Magyar Demokrata Szövetség (RMDSZ); Uniunea Democrată Maghiară din România (UDMR)	EPP	2 / 33
Slovakia	Christian Democratic Movement; Kresťanskodemokratické Hnutie (KDH)	EPP	1 / 15
Slovenia	Slovenian Democratic Party; Slovenska Demokratska Stranka (SDS)	EPP	3 / 9
Slovenia	New Slovenia – Christian Democrats; Nova Slovenija – Krščanski demokrati (NSi)	EPP	1 / 9
Spain	People's Party; Partido Popular (PP)	EPP	22 / 61
Sweden	Moderate Party; Moderata Samlingspartiet (M)	EPP	4 / 21
Sweden	Christian Democrats; Kristdemokraterna (KD)	EPP	1 / 21
European Union	Total		185 / 720

=== 9th European Parliament ===
State	National party	European alliance	MEPs
Austria	Austrian People's Party; Österreichische Volkspartei (ÖVP)	EPP	7 / 19
Belgium	Christian Democratic and Flemish; Christen-Democratisch & Vlaams (CD&V)	EPP	2 / 21
Belgium	The Committed Ones; Les Engagés (LE)	EPP	1 / 21
Belgium	Christian Social Party; Christlich Soziale Partei (CSP)	None	1 / 21
Bulgaria	Citizens for European Development of Bulgaria; Граждани за европейско развитие на България (GERB)	EPP	5 / 17
Bulgaria	Union of Democratic Forces; Съюз на демократичните сили (SDS)	EPP	1 / 17
Bulgaria	Democrats for a Strong Bulgaria; Демократи за силна България (DSB)	EPP	1 / 17
Croatia	Croatian Democratic Union; Hrvatska demokratska zajednica (HDZ)	EPP	4 / 12
Cyprus	Democratic Rally; Δημοκρατικός Συναγερμός (DISY)	EPP	2 / 6
Czech Republic	KDU-ČSL; KDU–ČSL	EPP	2 / 21
Czech Republic	TOP 09; TOP 09	EPP	2 / 21
Czech Republic	Mayors and Independents; Starostové a nezávislí (STAN)	None	1 / 21
Denmark	Conservative People's Party; Konservative Folkeparti (KF)	EPP	1 / 14
Estonia	Fatherland; Isamaa	EPP	1 / 7
Finland	National Coalition Party; Kansallinen Kokoomus (KK)	EPP	3 / 14
France	The Republicans; Les Républicains (LR)	EPP	7 / 79
France	The Centrists; Les Centristes (LC)	None	1 / 79
Germany	Christian Democratic Union; Christlich Demokratische Union Deutschlands (CDU)	EPP	23 / 96
Germany	Christian Social Union in Bavaria; Christlich-Soziale Union in Bayern e.V. (CSU)	EPP	6 / 96
Germany	Family Party of Germany; Familienpartei Deutschlands (FAMILIE)	ECPM	1 / 96
Greece	New Democracy; Νέα Δημοκρατία (ND)	EPP	6 / 21
Hungary	Christian Democratic People's Party; Kereszténydemokrata Néppárt (KDNP)	EPP	1 / 21
Ireland	Fine Gael; Fine Gael (FG)	EPP	5 / 13
Italy	Forward Italy; Forza Italia (FI)	EPP	11 / 76
Italy	South Tyrolean People's Party; Südtiroler Volkspartei (SVP)	EPP	1 / 76
Latvia	Unity; Vienotība	EPP	2 / 8
Lithuania	Homeland Union; Tėvynės Sąjunga (TS-LKD)	EPP	4 / 11
Luxembourg	Christian Social People's Party; Chrëschtlech Sozial Vollekspartei (CSV)	EPP	2 / 6
Malta	Nationalist Party; Partit Nazzjonalista (PN)	EPP	2 / 6
Netherlands	Christian Democratic Appeal; Christen-Democratisch Appèl (CDA)	EPP	5 / 29
Netherlands	Christian Union; ChristenUnie (CU)	ECPM	1 / 29
Poland	Civic Platform; Platforma Obywatelska (PO)	EPP	11 / 52
Poland	Polish People's Party; Polskie Stronnictwo Ludowe (PSL)	EPP	3 / 52
Poland	Independents; Magdalena Adamowicz, Janina Ochojska	Independent	2 / 52
Portugal	Social Democratic Party; Partido Social Democrata (PSD)	EPP	6 / 21
Portugal	Democratic and Social Centre – People's Party; Centro Democrático e Social – Partido Popular (CDS–PP)	EPP	1 / 21
Romania	National Liberal Party; Partidul Național Liberal (PNL)	EPP	10 / 33
Romania	Democratic Alliance of Hungarians in Romania; Romániai Magyar Demokrata Szövetség (RMDSZ); Uniunea Democrată Maghiară din România (UDMR)	EPP	2 / 33
Romania	People's Movement Party; Partidul Mișcarea Populară (PMP)	EPP	2 / 33
Slovakia	Christian Democratic Movement; Kresťanskodemokratické Hnutie (KDH)	EPP	2 / 14
Slovakia	Democrats; Demokrati (D)	EPP	1 / 14
Slovakia	Slovakia; Slovensko	EPP	1 / 14
Slovenia	Slovenian Democratic Party; Slovenska Demokratska Stranka (SDS)	EPP	2 / 8
Slovenia	New Slovenia – Christian Democrats; Nova Slovenija – Krščanski demokrati (NSi)	EPP	1 / 8
Slovenia	Slovenian People's Party; Slovenska ljudska stranka (SLS)	EPP	1 / 8
Spain	People's Party; Partido Popular (PP)	EPP	13 / 59
Sweden	Moderate Party; Moderata Samlingspartiet (M)	EPP	4 / 21
Sweden	Christian Democrats; Kristdemokraterna (KD)	EPP	1 / 21
Sweden	The People's List; Folklistan	None	1 / 21
European Union	Total		175 / 705

==== Former members ====
Country	Party	European alliance	MEPs
Hungary	Fidesz – Hungarian Civic Alliance; Fidesz – Magyar Polgári Szövetség (Fidesz)	None	10 / 21
Netherlands	50PLUS (50+)	None	0 / 29

=== 7th and 8th European Parliament ===
Country	Names	Names (English)	MEPs 2009–14	MEPs 2014–19
Austria	Österreichische Volkspartei	Austrian People's Party	6	▼5
Belgium	Dutch: Christen-Democratisch & Vlaams	Christian Democratic and Flemish	3	▼2
Belgium	French: Centre Démocrate Humaniste	Humanist Democratic Centre	1	1
Belgium	German: Christlich Soziale Partei	Christian Social Party	1	1
Bulgaria	Граждани за европейско развитие на България (Grazhdani za Evropeysko Razvitie na Balgariya)	Citizens for European Development of Bulgaria	5	▲6
Bulgaria	Съюз на демократичните сили (Sayuz na Demokratichnite Sili)	Union of Democratic Forces	1	▼0
Bulgaria	Демократи за силна България (Demokrati za Silna Balgariya)	Democrats for a Strong Bulgaria	1	1
Croatia	Hrvatska demokratska zajednica	Croatian Democratic Union	4	4
Croatia	Hrvatska seljačka stranka	Croatian Peasant Party	1	1
Cyprus	Greek: Δημοκρατικός Συναγερμός (Dimokratikós Sinayermós)	Democratic Rally	2	▼1
Czech Republic	Křesťanská a demokratická unie – Československá strana lidová	Christian and Democratic Union – Czechoslovak People's Party	2	▲3
Czech Republic	TOP 09	TOP 09	—	▲3
Czech Republic	Starostové a nezávislí	Mayors and Independents	—	▲1
Denmark	Det Konservative Folkeparti	Conservative People's Party	1	1
Estonia	Erakond Isamaa	Pro Patria	1	1
Finland	Kansallinen Kokoomus	National Coalition Party	3	3
Finland	Suomen kristillisdemokraatit	Christian Democrats	1	▼0
France	Les Républicains	The Republicans	27	▼18
France	Union des Démocrates et Indépendants	Union of Democrats and Independents	6	▼0
France	—	Independent	—	▲2
Germany	Christlich Demokratische Union Deutschlands	Christian Democratic Union	34	▼29
Germany	Christlich-Soziale Union in Bayern e.V.	Christian Social Union of Bavaria	8	▼5
Greece	Νέα Δημοκρατία (Néa Dimokratiá)	New Democracy	7	▼5
Hungary	Kereszténydemokrata Néppárt	Christian Democratic People's Party	1	1
Ireland	Fine Gael	Fine Gael	4	4
Italy	Forza Italia	Forza Italia	19	▼12
Italy	Alternativa Popolare	Popular Alternative	—	▲1
Italy	Unione di Centro	Union of the Centre	6	▼1
Italy	German: Südtiroler Volkspartei	South Tyrolean People's Party	1	1
Latvia	Vienotība	Unity	4	4
Lithuania	Tėvynės Sąjunga – Lietuvos Krikščionys Demokratai	Homeland Union – Lithuanian Christian Democrats	4	▼2
Lithuania	—	Independent	—	▲1
Luxembourg	Luxembourgish: Chrëschtlech-Sozial Vollekspartei; French: Parti Populaire Chrétien Social; German: Christlich-Soziale Volkspartei	Christian Social People's Party	3	3
Malta	Partit Nazzjonalista	Nationalist Party	2	▲3
Netherlands	Christen-Democratisch Appèl	Christian Democratic Appeal	5	5
Poland	Platforma Obywatelska	Civic Platform	25	▼18
Poland	Polskie Stronnictwo Ludowe	Polish People's Party	4	4
Portugal	Partido Social Democrata	Social Democratic Party	8	▼6
Portugal	Centro Democrático e Social – Partido Popular	Democratic and Social Centre – People's Party	2	▼1
Romania	Partidul Național Liberal	National Liberal Party	12	▼8
Romania	Hungarian: Romániai Magyar Demokrata Szövetség; Romanian: Uniunea Democrată Maghiară din România	Democratic Alliance of Hungarians in Romania	3	▼2
Romania	Partidul Mișcarea Populară	People's Movement Party	—	—
Romania	—	Independent	—	▲2
Slovakia	Kresťanskodemokratické hnutie	Christian Democratic Movement	2	▲3
Slovakia	Strana Maďarskej Koalície – Magyar Koalício Pártja	Party of the Hungarian Community	2	▼1
Slovakia	Most–Híd	Most–Híd	—	▲1
Slovakia	—	Independent	—	▲1
Slovenia	Slovenska demokratska stranka	Slovenian Democratic Party	3	3
Slovenia	Nova Slovenija – Krščanska Ljudska Stranka	New Slovenia – Christian People's Party	1	1
Slovenia	Slovenska ljudska stranka	Slovenian People's Party	—	▲1
Spain	Spanish: Partido Popular	People's Party	24	▼16
Spain	—	Independent	—	▲1
Sweden	Moderata samlingspartiet	Moderate Party	4	▼3
Sweden	Kristdemokraterna	Christian Democrats	1	1
United Kingdom	Change UK	Change UK (defection from Conservative Party/ECR)	0	▲1
United Kingdom	—	Renew Party (defection from Conservative Party/ECR)	0	▲1
Total			274	219

== Activities ==
=== In the news ===
Activities performed by the group in the period between June 2004 and June 2008 include monitoring elections in Palestine and Ukraine; encouraging transeuropean rail travel, telecoms deregulation, energy security, a common energy policy, the accession of Bulgaria and Romania to the Union, partial reform of the CAP and attempts to tackle illegal immigration; denouncing Russian involvement in South Ossetia; supporting the Constitution Treaty and the Lisbon Treaty; debating globalisation, relations with China, and Taiwan; backing plans to outlaw Holocaust denial; nominating Anna Politkovskaya for the 2007 Sakharov Prize; expelling Daniel Hannan from the Group; the discussion about whether ED MEPs should remain within EPP-ED or form a group of their own; criticisms of the group's approach to tackling low turnout for the 2009 elections; the group's use of the two-President arrangement; and the group's proposal to ban the Islamic Burka dress across the EU.

=== Parliamentary activity profile ===
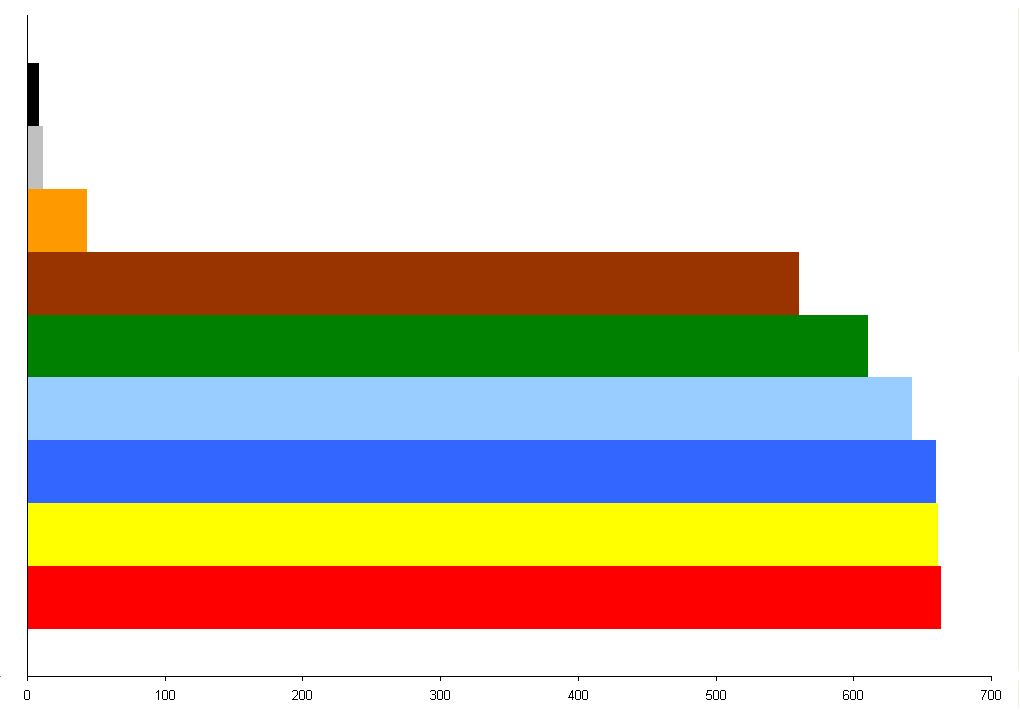
Group parliamentary activity profile, 1 August 2004 to 1 August 2008 (see description for sources). EPP-ED: 659 motions

The debates and votes in the European Parliament are tracked by its website and categorised by the groups that participate in them and the rule of procedure that they fall into. The results give a profile for each group by category and the total indicates the group's level of participation in Parliamentary debates. The activity profile for each group for the period 1 August 2004 to 1 August 2008 in the Sixth Parliament is given on the diagram on the right. The group is denoted in blue.

=== Publications ===
The group produces many publications, which can be found on its website.

== See also ==
- European People's Party
- Members of the European Parliament 2019–2024
