= Georg Pelster =

German politician (1897–1963)

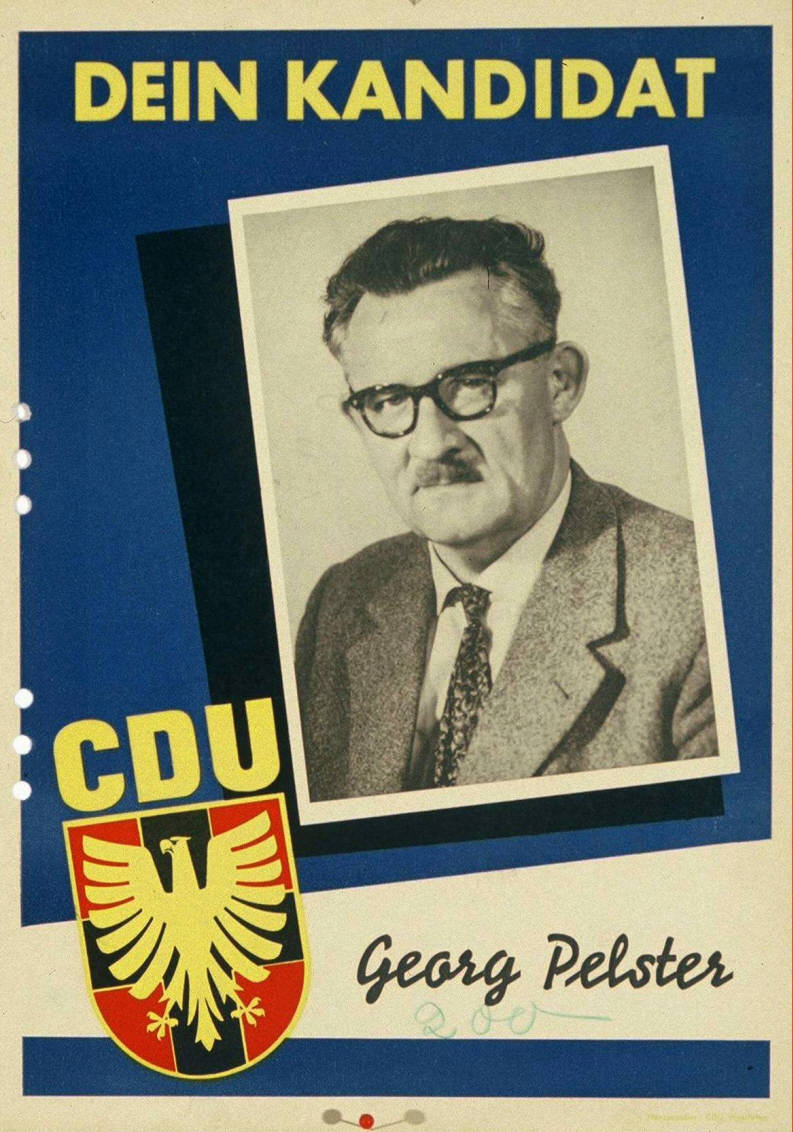
- Georg Pelster on a campaign poster for the 1957 federal elections

Member of the Bundestag
- In office 7 September 1949 – 15 October 1961

Personal details
- Born: 10 January 1897
- Died: 25 June 1963 (aged 66)
- Party: CDU

Georg Pelster (January 1, 1897 – in Rheine; June 25, 1963 in Rheine) was a German politician of the Christian Democratic Union (CDU) and former member of the German Bundestag.

== Life ==
From 1949 to 1961, he was a member of the German Bundestag, where he represented the constituency of Steinfurt-Tecklenburg as the last directly elected member of parliament with 60.8% of the first votes. From 16 July 1952 to 19 March 1958 he was also a member of the European Parliament.

== Literature ==
Herbst, Ludolf; Jahn, Bruno (2002). Vierhaus, Rudolf (ed.). Biographisches Handbuch der Mitglieder des Deutschen Bundestages. 1949–2002 [Biographical Handbook of the Members of the German Bundestag. 1949–2002] (in German). München: De Gruyter - De Gruyter Saur. p. 1715. ISBN 978-3-11-184511-1.
