= Westerkappeln =

- Municipality
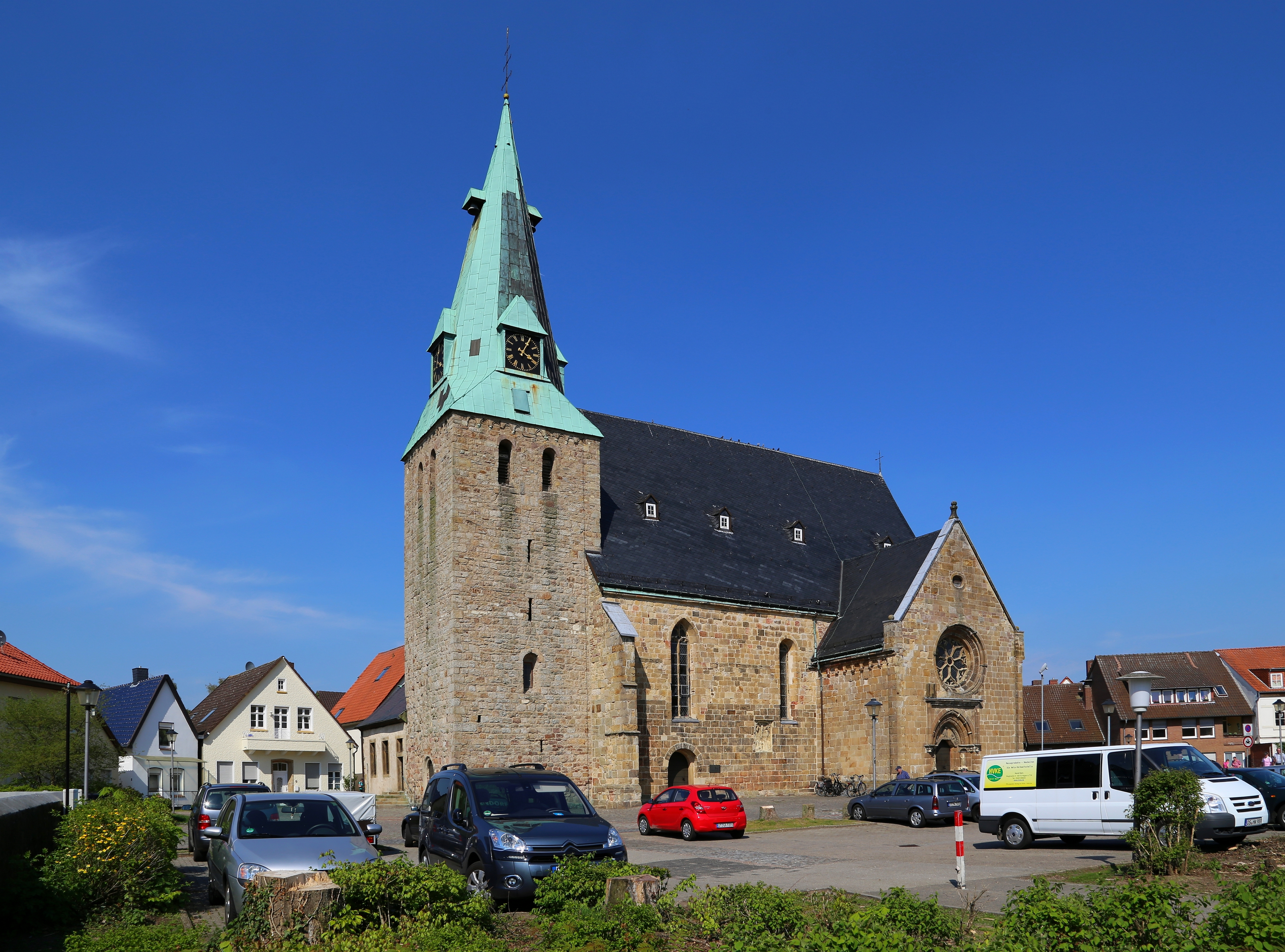

- Coat of arms

- Location of Westerkappeln within Steinfurt district
- Interactive map of Westerkappeln
- Location within Germany Location within North Rhine-Westphalia
- Coordinates: 52°22′50″N 7°36′00″E
- Country: Germany
- State: North Rhine-Westphalia
- Admin. region: Münster
- District: Steinfurt
- Subdivisions: 3

Government
  - Mayor (2020–25): Annette Große-Heitmeyer (Ind.)

Area
  - Total: 85.78 km^{2} (33.12 sq mi)
- Elevation: 60 m (200 ft)

Population (2025-12-31)
  - Total: 10,825
  - Density: 126.2/km^{2} (326.8/sq mi)
- Time zone: UTC+01:00 (CET)
  - Summer (DST): UTC+02:00 (CEST)
- Postal codes: 49492
- Dialling codes: 05404
- Vehicle registration: ST (until 1975: TE)
- Website: www.gemeinde-westerkappeln.de

Westerkappeln is a municipality in the district of Steinfurt, in North Rhine-Westphalia, Germany. It is situated approximately 15 km north-west of Osnabrück.

== Population ==
Historical population

Year	Pop.	±% p.a.
1965	8,505	—
1970	8,463	−0.10%
1975	8,603	+0.33%
1980	8,801	+0.46%
1985	8,865	+0.15%
1990	9,317	+1.00%
1995	10,635	+2.68%

Year	Pop.	±% p.a.
2000	11,271	+1.17%
2005	11,275	+0.01%
2010	11,190	−0.15%
2015	11,178	−0.02%
2020	11,234	+0.10%
2025	10,825	−0.74%

Source: Landesdatabank Nordrhein-Westfalen
