= List of members of the European Parliament for Germany, 2004–2009 =

Members of the European Parliament for Germany
ECSC delegation	(1952)
EP delegation	(1958)
1st term	(1979)
2nd term	(1984)
3rd term: (West Germany: 1989); (East Germany: 1991)
4th term	(1994)
5th term	(1999)
6th term	(2004)
7th term	(2009)
8th term	(2014)
9th term	(2019)
10th term	(2024)

This is a list of the 99 members of the European Parliament for Germany in the 2004 to 2009 session.

== List ==
Name	National party	EP Group
Alexander Nuno Alvaro	Free Democratic Party	ALDE
Angelika Beer	Alliance '90/The Greens	G–EFA
Rolf Berend	Christian Democratic Union	EPP–ED
Reimer Böge	Christian Democratic Union	EPP–ED
Hiltrud Breyer	Alliance '90/The Greens	G–EFA
André Brie	Party of Democratic Socialism (until 4 October 2007) The Left	EUL–NGL
Elmar Brok	Christian Democratic Union	EPP–ED
Udo Bullmann	Social Democratic Party	PES
Daniel Caspary	Christian Democratic Union	EPP–ED
Jorgo Chatzimarkakis	Free Democratic Party	ALDE
Daniel Cohn-Bendit	Alliance '90/The Greens	G–EFA
Michael Cramer	Alliance '90/The Greens	G–EFA
Albert Dess	Christian Social Union in Bavaria	EPP–ED
Garrelt Duin	Social Democratic Party	PES
Christian Ehler	Christian Democratic Union	EPP–ED
Markus Ferber	Christian Social Union in Bavaria	EPP–ED
Karl-Heinz Florenz	Christian Democratic Union	EPP–ED
Ingo Friedrich	Christian Social Union in Bavaria	EPP–ED
Michael Gahler	Christian Democratic Union	EPP–ED
Evelyne Gebhardt	Social Democratic Party	PES
Norbert Glante	Social Democratic Party	PES
Lutz Goepel	Christian Democratic Union	EPP–ED
Alfred Gomolka	Christian Democratic Union	EPP–ED
Friedrich-Wilhelm Graefe zu Baringdorf	Alliance '90/The Greens	G–EFA
Ingeborg Grässle	Christian Democratic Union	EPP–ED
Lissy Gröner	Social Democratic Party	PES
Garrelt Duin (until 17 October 2005) Matthias Groote (from 26 October 2005)	Social Democratic Party	PES
Klaus Hänsch	Social Democratic Party	PES
Rebecca Harms	Alliance '90/The Greens	G–EFA
Jutta Haug	Social Democratic Party	PES
Ruth Hieronymi	Christian Democratic Union	EPP–ED
Karsten Friedrich Hoppenstedt	Christian Democratic Union	EPP–ED
Milan Horáček	Alliance '90/The Greens	G–EFA
Georg Jarzembowski	Christian Democratic Union	EPP–ED
Elisabeth Jeggle	Christian Democratic Union	EPP–ED
Karin Jöns	Social Democratic Party	PES
Gisela Kallenbach	Alliance '90/The Greens	G–EFA
Sylvia-Yvonne Kaufmann	Party of Democratic Socialism (until 4 October 2007) The Left	EUL–NGL (until 13 May 2009) PES
Heinz Kindermann	Social Democratic Party	PES
Ewa Klamt	Christian Democratic Union	EPP–ED
Christa Klaß	Christian Democratic Union	EPP–ED
Wolf Klinz	Free Democratic Party	ALDE
Dieter-Lebrecht Koch	Christian Democratic Union	EPP–ED
Silvana Koch-Mehrin	Free Democratic Party	ALDE
Christoph Werner Konrad	Christian Democratic Union	EPP–ED
Holger Krahmer	Free Democratic Party	ALDE
Konstanze Krehl	Social Democratic Party	PES
Wolfgang Kreissl-Doerfler	Social Democratic Party	PES
Helmut Kuhne	Social Democratic Party	PES
Alexander Graf Lambsdorff	Free Democratic Party	ALDE
Werner Langen	Christian Democratic Union	EPP–ED
Armin Laschet (until 29 June 2005) Horst Posdorf (from 24 October 2005)	Christian Democratic Union	EPP–ED
Kurt Joachim Lauk	Christian Democratic Union	EPP–ED
Kurt Lechner	Christian Democratic Union	EPP–ED
Klaus-Heiner Lehne	Christian Democratic Union	EPP–ED
Jo Leinen	Social Democratic Party	PES
Peter Liese	Christian Democratic Union	EPP–ED
Erika Mann	Social Democratic Party	PES
Thomas Mann	Christian Democratic Union	EPP–ED
Helmuth Markov	Party of Democratic Socialism (until 4 October 2007) The Left	EUL–NGL
Hans-Peter Mayer	Christian Democratic Union	EPP–ED
Hartmut Nassauer	Christian Democratic Union	EPP–ED
Angelika Niebler	Christian Social Union in Bavaria	EPP–ED
Vural Öger	Social Democratic Party	PES
Cem Özdemir	Alliance '90/The Greens	G–EFA
Doris Pack	Christian Democratic Union	EPP–ED
Tobias Pflüger	Party of Democratic Socialism (until 4 October 2007) The Left	EUL–NGL
Willi Piecyk (until 31 July 2008) Ulrike Rodust (29 August 2008)	Social Democratic Party	PES
Markus Pieper	Christian Democratic Union	EPP–ED
Hans-Gert Poettering	Christian Democratic Union	EPP–ED
Bernd Posselt	Christian Social Union in Bavaria	EPP–ED
Godelieve Quisthoudt-Rowohl	Christian Democratic Union	EPP–ED
Alexander Radwan (until 2 December 2008) Martin Kastler (from 4 December 2008)	Christian Social Union in Bavaria	EPP–ED
Bernhard Rapkay	Social Democratic Party	PES
Herbert Reul	Christian Democratic Union	EPP–ED
Dagmar Roth-Behrendt	Social Democratic Party	PES
Mechtild Rothe	Social Democratic Party	PES
Heide Rühle	Alliance '90/The Greens	G–EFA
Frithjof Schmidt	Alliance '90/The Greens	G–EFA
Ingo Schmitt (until 17 October 2005) Roland Gewalt (from 27 October 2005)	Christian Democratic Union	EPP–ED
Horst Schnellhardt	Christian Democratic Union	EPP–ED
Juergen Schröder	Christian Democratic Union	EPP–ED
Elisabeth Schroedter	Alliance '90/The Greens	G–EFA
Martin Schulz	Social Democratic Party	PES
Willem Schuth	Free Democratic Party	ALDE
Andreas Schwab	Christian Democratic Union	EPP–ED
Renate Sommer	Christian Democratic Union	EPP–ED
Ulrich Stockmann	Social Democratic Party	PES
Helga Trüpel	Alliance '90/The Greens	G–EFA
Feleknas Uca	Party of Democratic Socialism (until 4 October 2007) The Left	EUL–NGL
Thomas Ulmer	Christian Democratic Union	EPP–ED
Karl von Wogau	Christian Democratic Union	EPP–ED
Sahra Wagenknecht	Party of Democratic Socialism (until 4 October 2007) The Left	EUL–NGL
Ralf Walter	Social Democratic Party	PES
Manfred Weber	Christian Social Union in Bavaria	EPP–ED
Barbara Weiler	Social Democratic Party	PES
Anja Weisgerber	Christian Social Union in Bavaria	EPP–ED
Reiner Wieland	Christian Democratic Union	EPP–ED
Joachim Wuermeling (until 18 December 2005) Gabriele Stauner (17 January 2006)	Christian Social Union in Bavaria	EPP–ED
Gabi Zimmer	Party of Democratic Socialism (until 4 October 2007) The Left	EUL–NGL

=== Party representation ===
National party	EP Group	Seats	±
Christian Democratic Union	EPP–ED	40 / 99	▼3
Social Democratic Party	PES	23 / 99	▼10
Alliance '90/The Greens	G–EFA	13 / 99	▲6
Christian Social Union (Bavaria)	EPP–ED	9 / 99	▼1
Party of Democratic Socialism	EUL–NGL	7 / 99	▲1
Free Democratic Party	ALDE	7 / 99	▲7
