= List of members of the European Parliament for Germany, 2009–2014 =

Members of the European Parliament for Germany
ECSC delegation	(1952)
EP delegation	(1958)
1st term	(1979)
2nd term	(1984)
3rd term: (West Germany: 1989); (East Germany: 1991)
4th term	(1994)
5th term	(1999)
6th term	(2004)
7th term	(2009)
8th term	(2014)
9th term	(2019)
10th term	(2024)

This is a list of the 99 members of the European Parliament for Germany in the 2009 to 2014 session.

== List ==
Name	National party	EP Group
Jan Philipp Albrecht	Alliance '90/The Greens	G–EFA
Alexander Alvaro	Free Democratic Party	ALDE
Burkhard Balz	Christian Democratic Union	EPP
Lothar Bisky	The Left	EUL–NGL
Franziska Brantner	Alliance '90/The Greens	G–EFA
Elmar Brok	Christian Democratic Union	EPP
Udo Bullmann	Social Democratic Party	S&D
Reimer Böge	Christian Democratic Union	EPP
Reinhard Bütikofer	Alliance '90/The Greens	G–EFA
Daniel Caspary	Christian Democratic Union	EPP
Jorgo Chatzimarkakis	Free Democratic Party	ALDE
Michael Cramer	Alliance '90/The Greens	G–EFA
Jürgen Creutzmann	Free Democratic Party	ALDE
Albert Deß	Christian Social Union (Bavaria)	EPP
Christian Ehler	Christian Democratic Union	EPP
Cornelia Ernst	The Left	EUL–NGL
Ismail Ertug	Social Democratic Party	S&D
Markus Ferber	Christian Social Union (Bavaria)	EPP
Knut Fleckenstein	Social Democratic Party	S&D
Karl-Heinz Florenz	Christian Democratic Union	EPP
Michael Gahler	Christian Democratic Union	EPP
Evelyne Gebhardt	Social Democratic Party	S&D
Jens Geier	Social Democratic Party	S&D
Sven Giegold	Alliance '90/The Greens	G–EFA
Norbert Glante	Social Democratic Party	S&D
Alexander Graf Lambsdorff	Free Democratic Party	ALDE
Matthias Groote	Social Democratic Party	S&D
Ingeborg Grässle	Christian Democratic Union	EPP
Rebecca Harms	Alliance '90/The Greens	G–EFA
Jutta Haug	Social Democratic Party	S&D
Nadja Hirsch	Free Democratic Party	ALDE
Monika Hohlmeier	Christian Social Union (Bavaria)	EPP
Gerald Häfner	Alliance '90/The Greens	G–EFA
Thomas Händel	The Left	EUL–NGL
Martin Häusling	Alliance '90/The Greens	G–EFA
Peter Jahr	Christian Democratic Union	EPP
Elisabeth Jeggle	Christian Democratic Union	EPP
Petra Kammerevert	Social Democratic Party	S&D
Martin Kastler	Christian Social Union (Bavaria)	EPP
Ska Keller	Alliance '90/The Greens	G–EFA
Christa Klaß	Christian Democratic Union	EPP
Wolf Klinz	Free Democratic Party	ALDE
Jürgen Klute	The Left	EUL–NGL
Dieter-Lebrecht Koch	Christian Democratic Union	EPP
Silvana Koch-Mehrin	Free Democratic Party	ALDE
Holger Krahmer	Free Democratic Party	ALDE
Constanze Krehl	Social Democratic Party	S&D
Wolfgang Kreissl-Dörfler	Social Democratic Party	S&D
Werner Kuhn	Christian Democratic Union	EPP
Bernd Lange	Social Democratic Party	S&D
Werner Langen	Christian Democratic Union	EPP
Kurt Lechner	Christian Democratic Union	EPP
Klaus-Heiner Lehne	Christian Democratic Union	EPP
Jo Leinen	Social Democratic Party	S&D
Hans-Peter Liese	Christian Democratic Union	EPP
Barbara Lochbihler	Alliance '90/The Greens	G–EFA
Sabine Lösing	The Left	EUL–NGL
Thomas Mann	Christian Democratic Union	EPP
Hans-Peter Mayer	Christian Democratic Union	EPP
Gesine Meißner	Free Democratic Party	ALDE
Norbert Neuser	Social Democratic Party	S&D
Angelika Niebler	Christian Social Union (Bavaria)	EPP
Doris Pack	Christian Democratic Union	EPP
Markus Pieper	Christian Democratic Union	EPP
Bernd Posselt	Christian Social Union (Bavaria)	EPP
Hans-Gert Pöttering	Christian Democratic Union	EPP
Godelieve Quisthoudt-Rowohl	Christian Democratic Union	EPP
Bernhard Rapkay	Social Democratic Party	S&D
Britta Reimers	Free Democratic Party	ALDE
Herbert Reul	Christian Democratic Union	EPP
Dagmar Roth-Behrendt	Social Democratic Party	S&D
Ulrike Rodust	Social Democratic Party	PASD
Heide Rühle	Alliance '90/The Greens	G–EFA
Horst Schnellhardt	Christian Democratic Union	EPP
Birgit Schnieber-Jastram	Christian Democratic Union	EPP
Helmut Scholz	The Left	EUL–NGL
Elisabeth Schroedter	Alliance '90/The Greens	G–EFA
Martin Schulz	Social Democratic Party	S&D
Werner Schulz	Alliance '90/The Greens	G–EFA
Andreas Schwab	Christian Democratic Union	EPP
Peter Simon	Social Democratic Party	S&D
Birgit Sippel	Social Democratic Party	S&D
Renate Sommer	Christian Democratic Union	EPP
Jutta Steinruck	Social Democratic Party	S&D
Alexandra Thein	Free Democratic Party	ALDE
Michael Theurer	Free Democratic Party	ALDE
Helga Trüpel	Alliance '90/The Greens	G–EFA
Thomas Ulmer	Christian Democratic Union	EPP
Sabine Verheyen	Christian Democratic Union	EPP
Axel Voss	Christian Democratic Union	EPP
Manfred Weber	Christian Social Union (Bavaria)	EPP
Barbara Weiler	Social Democratic Party	S&D
Anja Weisgerber	Christian Social Union (Bavaria)	EPP
Kerstin Westphal	Social Democratic Party	S&D
Rainer Wieland	Christian Democratic Union	EPP
Sabine Wils	The Left	EUL–NGL
Hermann Winkler	Christian Democratic Union	EPP
Joachim Zeller	Christian Democratic Union	EPP
Gabi Zimmer	The Left	EUL–NGL

=== Party representation ===
National party	EP Group	Seats	±
Christian Democratic Union	EPP	34 / 99	▼6
Social Democratic Party	S&D	23 / 99	Steady
Alliance '90/The Greens	G–EFA	14 / 99	▲1
Free Democratic Party	ALDE	12 / 99	▲5
The Left	EUL–NGL	8 / 99	▲1
Christian Social Union (Bavaria)	EPP	8 / 99	▼1
