= List of members of the European Parliament for Germany, 2014–2019 =

This is a list of members of the European Parliament for Germany in the 2014 to 2019 session. German MEPs represent the constituency of the same name.

Members of the European Parliament for Germany
ECSC delegation	(1952)
EP delegation	(1958)
1st term	(1979)
2nd term	(1984)
3rd term: (West Germany: 1989); (East Germany: 1991)
4th term	(1994)
5th term	(1999)
6th term	(2004)
7th term	(2009)
8th term	(2014)
9th term	(2019)
10th term	(2024)

== List ==
On the Christian Democratic Union list: (EPP): 1. Burkhard Balz – until 31 August 2018 Stefan Gehrold – from 20 September 2018; 2. Reimer Böge; 3. Elmar Brok; 4. Daniel Caspary; 5. Birgit Collin-Langen; 6. Jan Christian Ehler; 7. Karl-Heinz Florenz; 8. Michael Gahler; 9. Jens Gieseke; 10. Ingeborg Gräßle; 11. Peter Jahr; 12. Dieter-Lebrecht Koch; 13. Werner Kuhn; 14. Werner Langen; 15. Peter Liese; 16. Norbert Lins; 17. Thomas Mann; 18. David McAllister; 19. Markus Pieper; 20. Godelieve Quisthoudt-Rowohl; 21. Herbert Reul – until 6 July 2017 Dennis Radtke – from 24 July 2017; 22. Sven Schulze; 23. Andreas Schwab; 24. Renate Sommer; 25. Sabine Verheyen; 26. Axel Voss; 27. Rainer Wieland; 28. Hermann Winkler; 29. Joachim Zeller; On the Social Democratic Party of Germany list: (S&D): 1. Martin Schulz – until 10 February 2017 Arndt Kohn – from 24 February 2017; 2. Birgit Sippel; 3. Udo Bullmann; 4. Kerstin Westphal; 5. Bernd Lange; 6. Evelyne Gebhardt; 7. Jens Geier; 8. Jutta Steinruck – until 31 December 2017 Michael Detjen – from 1 January 2018; 9. Ismail Ertug; 10. Sylvia-Yvonne Kaufmann; 11. Matthias Groote – until 31 October 2016 Tiemo Wölken – from 14 November 2016; 12. Ulrike Rodust; 13. Dietmar Köster; 14. Petra Kammerevert; 15. Jo Leinen; 16. Martina Werner; 17. Peter Simon; 18. Maria Noichl; 19. Knut Fleckenstein; 20. Gabriele Preuß; 21. Joachim Schuster; 22. Susanne Melior; 23. Constanze Krehl; 24. Arne Lietz; 25. Jakob von Weizsäcker – until 6 January 2019 Babette Winter – from 10 January 2019; 26. Iris Hoffmann; 27. Norbert Neuser	On the Alliance '90 / The Greens list: (Greens-EFA): 1. Rebecca Harms; 2. Sven Giegold; 3. Ska Keller; 4. Reinhard Bütikofer; 5. Barbara Lochbihler; 6. Jan Philipp Albrecht – until 2 July 2018 Romeo Franz – from 3 July 2018; 7. Helga Trüpel; 8. Martin Häusling; 9. Terry Reintke; 10. Michael Cramer; 11. Maria Heubuch; On the Left list: (GUE–NGL): 1. Gabi Zimmer; 2. Thomas Händel; 3. Cornelia Ernst; 4. Helmut Scholz; 5. Sabine Lösing; 6. Fabio De Masi – until 23 October 2017 Martin Schirdewan – from 8 November 2017; 7. Martina Michels; On the Alternative for Germany list: (ECR Group): 1. Bernd Lucke (left the party in July 2015, joined LKR); 2. Hans-Olaf Henkel (left the party in July 2015, joined LKR, since 13 November 2018 independent); 3. Bernd Kölmel (left the party in July 2015, joined LKR, since 13 November 2018 independent); 4. Beatrix von Storch (left ECR group in April 2016, joined EFDD group) – until 23 October 2017Jörg Meuthen – from 8 November 2017 (EFDD); 5. Joachim Starbatty (left the party in July 2015, LKR, since 13 November 2018 independent); 6. Ulrike Trebesius (left the party in July 2015, LKR, since 13 November 2018 independent); 7. Marcus Pretzell (expelled from ECR group in April 2016, since May 2016 ENF and since 14 November 2017 The Blue Party).; On the Christian Social Union in Bavaria list: (EPP): 1. Markus Ferber; 2. Angelika Niebler; 3. Manfred Weber; 4. Monika Hohlmeier; 5. Albert Dess; On the Free Democratic Party list: (ALDE): 1. Alexander Graf Lambsdorff – until 23 October 2017 Nadja Hirsch – from 8 November 2017; 2. Michael Theurer – until 23 October 2017 Wolf Klinz – from 8 November 2017; 3. Gesine Meißner; On the Free Voters list: (ALDE): 1. Ulrike Müller; On the Pirate Party list: (Greens-EFA): 1. Felix Reda; On the Animal Protection Party list: (GUE–NGL): 1. Stefan Eck (left the party on 8 January 2015); On the National Democratic Party of Germany list: (Non-inscrits): 1. Udo Voigt; On the Family Party of Germany list: (ECR Group): 1. Arne Gericke (from 1 June 2017 to 14 October 2018 Free Voters, from then Bündnis C); On the Ecological Democratic Party list: (Greens-EFA): 1. Klaus Buchner; On The PARTY list: (Non-inscrits): 1. Martin Sonneborn

== See also ==
- 2014 European Parliament election in Germany
