= List of members of the European Parliament for Germany, 1989–1994 =

Members of the European Parliament for Germany
| ECSC delegation | (1952) |
| EP delegation | (1958) |
| 1st term | (1979) |
| 2nd term | (1984) |
3rd term: (West Germany: 1989); (East Germany: 1991)
| 4th term | (1994) |
| 5th term | (1999) |
| 6th term | (2004) |
| 7th term | (2009) |
| 8th term | (2014) |
| 9th term | (2019) |
| 10th term | (2024) |

This is a list of the 81 members of the European Parliament for West Germany in the 1989 to 1994 session.

== List ==
| Name | National party | EP Group |
|---|---|---|
| Willi Görlach | Social Democratic Party | SOC |
| Lissy Gröner | Social Democratic Party | SOC |
| Klaus Hänsch | Social Democratic Party | SOC |
| Magdalene Hoff | Social Democratic Party | SOC |
| Karin Junker | Social Democratic Party | SOC |
| Heinz Fritz Köhler | Social Democratic Party | SOC |
| Beate Weber-Schuerholz (until 14 December 1990) Annemarie Kuhn (from 22 December 1990) | Social Democratic Party | SOC |
| Rolf Linkohr | Social Democratic Party | SOC |
| Günter Lüttge | Social Democratic Party | SOC |
| Gepa Maibaum | Social Democratic Party | SOC |
| Karl-Heinrich Mihr | Social Democratic Party | SOC |
| Leyla Onur | Social Democratic Party | SOC |
| Helwin Peter | Social Democratic Party | SOC |
| Johannes Wilhelm Peters | Social Democratic Party | SOC |
| Gerd Walter (until 7 May 1992) Willi Piecyk (from 11 May 1992) | Social Democratic Party | SOC |
| Christa Randzio-Plath | Social Democratic Party | SOC |
| Dieter Rogalla | Social Democratic Party | SOC |
| Dagmar Roth-Behrendt | Social Democratic Party | SOC |
| Mechtild Rothe | Social Democratic Party | SOC |
| Willi Rothley | Social Democratic Party | SOC |
| Jannis Sakellariou | Social Democratic Party | SOC |
| Heinke Salisch | Social Democratic Party | SOC |
| Detlev Samland | Social Democratic Party | SOC |
| Dieter Schinzel | Social Democratic Party | SOC |
| Gerhard Schmid | Social Democratic Party | SOC |
| Barbara Schmidbauer | Social Democratic Party | SOC |
| Barbara Simons | Social Democratic Party | SOC |
| Günter Topmann | Social Democratic Party | SOC |
| Kurt Vittinghoff | Social Democratic Party | SOC |
| Thomas von der Vring | Social Democratic Party | SOC |
| Klaus Wettig | Social Democratic Party | SOC |
| Siegbert Alber | Christian Democratic Union | EPP |
| Reimer Böge | Christian Democratic Union | EPP |
| Axel Zarges (until December 29, 1989) Ursula Braun-Moser (from 15 January 1990) | Christian Democratic Union | EPP |
| Elmar Brok | Christian Democratic Union | EPP |
| Karl-Heinz Florenz | Christian Democratic Union | EPP |
| Honor Funk | Christian Democratic Union | EPP |
| Bernhard Sälzer (until 18 December 1993) Helga Haller von Hallerstein (from 27 December 1993) | Christian Democratic Union | EPP |
| Karsten Friedrich Hoppenstedt | Christian Democratic Union | EPP |
| Hartmut Perschau (until 10 July 1991) Georg Jarzembowski (from 5 September 1991) | Christian Democratic Union | EPP |
| Hedwig Keppelhoff-Wiechert | Christian Democratic Union | EPP |
| Egon Klepsch | Christian Democratic Union | EPP |
| Werner Münch (until November 19, 1990) Brigitte Langenhagen (from November 25, 1990) | Christian Democratic Union | EPP |
| Horst Langes | Christian Democratic Union | EPP |
| Gerd Ludwig Lemmer | Christian Democratic Union | EPP |
| Marlene Lenz | Christian Democratic Union | EPP |
| Rudolf Luster | Christian Democratic Union | EPP |
| Kurt Malangré | Christian Democratic Union | EPP |
| Winfried Menrad | Christian Democratic Union | EPP |
| Friedrich Merz | Christian Democratic Union | EPP |
| Doris Pack | Christian Democratic Union | EPP |
| Hans-Gert Pöttering | Christian Democratic Union | EPP |
| Godelieve Quisthoudt-Rowohl | Christian Democratic Union | EPP |
| Günter Rinsche | Christian Democratic Union | EPP |
| Diemut Theato | Christian Democratic Union | EPP |
| Karl von Wogau | Christian Democratic Union | EPP |
| Hiltrud Breyer | The Greens | G |
| Birgit Cramon Daiber | The Greens | G |
| Friedrich-Wilhelm Graefe zu Baringdorf | The Greens | G |
| Karl Partsch | Independent (elected for The Greens as an independent politician) | G (until 20 November 1991) LDR |
| Dorothee Piermont | The Greens Independent | G (until 24 September 1989) RBW |
| Eva-Maria Quistorp | The Greens | G |
| Claudia Roth | The Greens | G |
| Wilfried Telkämper | The Greens | G |
| Franz-Ludwig Schenk Graf von Stauffenberg (until 30 November 1992) Günther Müller (from 4 December 1992 to 6 November 1993) Jürgen Brand (from 16 November 1993) | Christian Social Union (Bavaria) | EPP |
| Ingo Friedrich | Christian Social Union (Bavaria) | EPP |
| Fritz Pirkl (until 19 August 1993) Maren Günther (from 31 August 1993) | Christian Social Union (Bavaria) | EPP |
| Otto von Habsburg | Christian Social Union (Bavaria) | EPP |
| Gerd Müller | Christian Social Union (Bavaria) | EPP |
| Reinhold Bocklet (until 24 June 1993) Edgar Schiedermeier (from 5 July 1993) | Christian Social Union (Bavaria) | EPP |
| Ursula Schleicher | Christian Social Union (Bavaria) | EPP |
| Johanna Grund | The Republicans (until 17 February 1991) Independent | DR (until 13 May 1991) NI |
| Klaus-Peter Köhler | The Republicans (until 17 February 1991) Independent | DR |
| Harald Neubauer | The Republicans (until 17 February 1991) Independent (until 31 December 1992) German League | DR (until 30 January 1994) NI |
| Emil Schlee | The Republicans (until 23 April 1991) Independent | DR (until 23 April 1991) NI |
| Hans-Günter Schodruch | The Republicans (until 17 February 1991) Independent | DR |
| Franz Schönhuber | The Republicans | DR (until 10 December 1990) NI |
| Mechthild von Alemann | Free Democratic Party | LDR |
| Martin Holzfuss | Free Democratic Party | LDR |
| Manfred Vohrer | Free Democratic Party | LDR |
| Rüdiger von Wechmar | Free Democratic Party | LDR |
