= List of members of the European Parliament for Germany, 1999–2004 =

Members of the European Parliament for Germany
ECSC delegation	(1952)
EP delegation	(1958)
1st term	(1979)
2nd term	(1984)
3rd term: (West Germany: 1989); (East Germany: 1991)
4th term	(1994)
5th term	(1999)
6th term	(2004)
7th term	(2009)
8th term	(2014)
9th term	(2019)
10th term	(2024)

This is a list of the 99 members of the European Parliament for Germany in the 1999 to 2004 session.

== List ==
Name	National party	EP Group
Rolf Berend	Christian Democratic Union	EPP–ED
Reimer Böge	Christian Democratic Union	EPP–ED
Christian Ulrik von Boetticher	Christian Democratic Union	EPP–ED
Hiltrud Breyer	Alliance '90/The Greens	G–EFA
André Brie	Party of Democratic Socialism	EUL–NGL
Elmar Brok	Christian Democratic Union	EPP–ED
Hans Udo Bullmann	Social Democratic Party	PES
Ozan Ceyhun	Alliance '90/The Greens (until October 22, 2000) Social Democratic Party	G–EFA (until October 22, 2000) PES
Günter Lüttge (7 September 2000) Garrelt Duin (from 2 October 2000)	Social Democratic Party	PES
Markus Ferber	Christian Social Union in Bavaria	EPP–ED
Christel Fiebiger	Party of Democratic Socialism	EUL–NGL
Karl-Heinz Florenz	Christian Democratic Union	EPP–ED
Ingo Friedrich	Christian Social Union in Bavaria	EPP–ED
Michael Gahler	Christian Democratic Union	EPP–ED
Evelyne Gebhardt	Social Democratic Party	PES
Norbert Glante	Social Democratic Party	PES
Anne-Karin Glase	Christian Democratic Union	EPP–ED
Lutz Goepel	Christian Democratic Union	EPP–ED
Willi Görlach	Social Democratic Party	PES
Alfred Gomolka	Christian Democratic Union	EPP–ED
Friedrich-Wilhelm Graefe zu Baringdorf	Alliance '90/The Greens	G–EFA
Lissy Gröner	Social Democratic Party	PES
Klaus Hänsch	Social Democratic Party	PES
Jutta D. Haug	Social Democratic Party	PES
Ruth Hieronymi	Christian Democratic Union	EPP–ED
Magdalene Hoff	Social Democratic Party	PES
Georg Jarzembowski	Christian Democratic Union	EPP–ED
Elisabeth Jeggle	Christian Democratic Union	EPP–ED
Karin Jöns	Social Democratic Party	PES
Karin Junker	Social Democratic Party	PES
Emilia Müller (until 5 November 2003) Martin Kastler (from 14 November 2003)	Christian Social Union in Bavaria	EPP–ED
Sylvia-Yvonne Kaufmann	Party of Democratic Socialism	EUL–NGL
Hedwig Keppelhoff-Wiechert	Christian Democratic Union	EPP–ED
Margot Kessler	Social Democratic Party	PES
Heinz Kindermann	Social Democratic Party	PES
Ewa Klamt	Christian Democratic Union	EPP–ED
Christa Klaß	Christian Democratic Union	EPP–ED
Karsten Knolle	Christian Democratic Union	EPP–ED
Dieter-Lebrecht Koch	Christian Democratic Union	EPP–ED
Christoph Konrad	Christian Democratic Union	EPP–ED
Constanze Krehl	Social Democratic Party	PES
Wolfgang Kreissl-Dörfler	Alliance '90/The Greens (until October 25, 2000) Social Democratic Party	G–EFA (until October 25, 2000) PES
Wilfried Kuckelkorn	Social Democratic Party	PES
Helmut Kuhne	Social Democratic Party	PES
Bernd Lange	Social Democratic Party	PES
Werner Langen	Christian Democratic Union	EPP–ED
Brigitte Langenhagen	Christian Democratic Union	EPP–ED
Armin Laschet	Christian Democratic Union	EPP–ED
Kurt Lechner	Christian Democratic Union	EPP–ED
Klaus-Heiner Lehne	Christian Democratic Union	EPP–ED
Jo Leinen	Social Democratic Party	PES
Peter Liese	Christian Democratic Union	EPP–ED
Rolf Linkohr	Social Democratic Party	PES
Erika Mann	Social Democratic Party	PES
Thomas Mann	Christian Democratic Union	EPP–ED
Helmuth Markov	Party of Democratic Socialism	EUL–NGL
Hans-Peter Mayer	Christian Democratic Union	EPP–ED
Xaver Mayer	Christian Social Union in Bavaria	EPP–ED
Winfried Menrad	Christian Democratic Union	EPP–ED
Hans Modrow	Party of Democratic Socialism	EUL–NGL
Peter Mombaur	Christian Democratic Union	EPP–ED
Rosemarie Müller	Social Democratic Party	PES
Hartmut Nassauer	Christian Democratic Union	EPP–ED
Angelika Niebler	Christian Social Union in Bavaria	EPP–ED
Doris Pack	Christian Democratic Union	EPP–ED
Wilhelm Piecyk	Social Democratic Party	PES
Hans-Gert Pöttering	Christian Democratic Union	EPP–ED
Bernd Posselt	Christian Social Union in Bavaria	EPP–ED
Godelieve Quisthoudt-Rowohl	Christian Democratic Union	EPP–ED
Alexander Radwan	Christian Social Union in Bavaria	EPP–ED
Christa Randzio-Plath	Social Democratic Party	PES
Bernhard Rapkay	Social Democratic Party	PES
Dagmar Roth-Behrendt	Social Democratic Party	PES
Mechtild Rothe	Social Democratic Party	PES
Willi Rothley	Social Democratic Party	PES
Heide Rühle	Alliance '90/The Greens	G–EFA
Jannis Sakellariou	Social Democratic Party	PES
Ursula Schleicher	Christian Social Union in Bavaria	EPP–ED
Gerhard Schmid	Social Democratic Party	PES
Ingo Schmitt	Christian Democratic Union	EPP–ED
Horst Schnellhardt	Christian Democratic Union	EPP–ED
Ilka Schröder	Alliance '90/The Greens (until 31 August 2000) Independent	G–EFA (until 27 September 2001) EUL–NGL
Jürgen Schröder	Christian Democratic Union	EPP–ED
Elisabeth Schroedter	Alliance '90/The Greens	G–EFA
Martin Schulz	Social Democratic Party	PES
Konrad Schwaiger	Christian Democratic Union	EPP–ED
Renate Sommer	Christian Democratic Union	EPP–ED
Gabriele Stauner	Christian Social Union in Bavaria	EPP–ED
Ulrich Stockmann	Social Democratic Party	PES
Diemut Theato	Christian Democratic Union	EPP–ED
Feleknas Uca	Party of Democratic Socialism	EUL–NGL
Ralf Walter	Social Democratic Party	PES
Barbara Weiler	Social Democratic Party	PES
Stanislaw Tillich (until 26 October 1999) Brigitte Wenzel-Perillo (from November 27, 1999)	Christian Democratic Union	EPP–ED
Rainer Wieland	Christian Democratic Union	EPP–ED
Karl von Wogau	Christian Democratic Union	EPP–ED
Joachim Wuermeling	Christian Social Union in Bavaria	EPP–ED
Jürgen Zimmerling	Christian Democratic Union	EPP–ED
Sabine Zissener	Christian Democratic Union	EPP–ED

=== Party representation (at the end of the session) ===
National party	EP Group	Seats	±
Christian Democratic Union	EPP–ED	43 / 99	▲4
Social Democratic Party	PES	35 / 99	▼5
Christian Social Union (Bavaria)	EPP–ED	10 / 99	▲2
Alliance '90/The Greens	G–EFA	4 / 99	▼8
Party of Democratic Socialism	EUL–NGL	6 / 99	▲6
Independent	EUL–NGL	1 / 99	▲1
