= List of members of the European Parliament for West Germany, 1979–1984 =

Members of the European Parliament for Germany
ECSC delegation	(1952)
EP delegation	(1958)
1st term	(1979)
2nd term	(1984)
3rd term: (West Germany: 1989); (East Germany: 1991)
4th term	(1994)
5th term	(1999)
6th term	(2004)
7th term	(2009)
8th term	(2014)
9th term	(2019)
10th term	(2024)

This is a list of the 81 members of the European Parliament for West Germany in the 1979 to 1984 session.

== List ==
Name	National party	EP Group
Jochen van Aerssen	Christian Democratic Union	EPP
Siegbert Alber	Christian Democratic Union	EPP
Philipp von Bismarck	Christian Democratic Union	EPP
Erik Blumenfeld	Christian Democratic Union	EPP
Isidor Früh	Christian Democratic Union	EPP
Wilhelm Hahn	Christian Democratic Union	EPP
Kai-Uwe von Hassel	Christian Democratic Union	EPP
Wilhelm Helms	Christian Democratic Union	EPP
Karl-Heinz Hoffmann	Christian Democratic Union	EPP
Hans Katzer	Christian Democratic Union	EPP
Egon Klepsch	Christian Democratic Union	EPP
Herbert Köhler (Note: Resigned on 16 January 1981. Replaced by Otmar Franz on 30 January 1981.)	Christian Democratic Union	EPP
Horst Langes	Christian Democratic Union	EPP
Gerd Lemmer	Christian Democratic Union	EPP
Marlene Lenz	Christian Democratic Union	EPP
Rudolf Luster	Christian Democratic Union	EPP
Ernst Majonica	Christian Democratic Union	EPP
Kurt Malangré	Christian Democratic Union	EPP
Meinholf Mertens	Christian Democratic Union	EPP
Ernst Müller-Hermann	Christian Democratic Union	EPP
Franz-Josef Nordlohne (Note: Died 29 January 1981. Replaced by Rudolf Wedekind on 17 February 1981.)	Christian Democratic Union	EPP
Gero Pfennig	Christian Democratic Union	EPP
Hans-Gert Pöttering	Christian Democratic Union	EPP
Albert Pürtsen (Note: Resigned on 10 June 1980. Replaced by Elmar Brok on 17 June 1980.)	Christian Democratic Union	EPP
Renate-Charlotte Rabbethge	Christian Democratic Union	EPP
Günter Rinsche	Christian Democratic Union	EPP
Bernhard Sälzer	Christian Democratic Union	EPP
Casimir J. Prinz zu Sayn-Wittgenstein-Berleburg (Note: Resigned on 30 December 1983. Replaced by Axel N. Zarges on 1 January 1984.)	Christian Democratic Union	EPP
Wolfgang Schall	Christian Democratic Union	EPP
Paul Schnitker	Christian Democratic Union	EPP
Konrad Schön	Christian Democratic Union	EPP
Hanna Walz	Christian Democratic Union	EPP
Kurt Wawrzik	Christian Democratic Union	EPP
Karl von Wogau	Christian Democratic Union	EPP
Joachim Wuermeling	Christian Democratic Union	EPP
Heinrich Aigner	Christian Social Union	EPP
Reinhold Bocklet	Christian Social Union	EPP
Ingo Friedrich	Christian Social Union	EPP
Karl Fuchs	Christian Social Union	EPP
Alfons Goppel	Christian Social Union	EPP
Otto von Habsburg	Christian Social Union	EPP
Hans August Lücker	Christian Social Union	EPP
Ursula Schleicher	Christian Social Union	EPP
Mechthild von Alemann	Free Democratic Party	LD
Martin Bangemann	Free Democratic Party	LD
Ulrich Irmer	Free Democratic Party	LD
Heinrich Jürgens	Free Democratic Party	LD
Rudi Arndt	Social Democratic Party	SOC
Willy Brandt (Note: Resigned in 1983. Replaced by Hermann Heinemann on 11 March 1983.)	Social Democratic Party	SOC
Ludwig Fellermaier	Social Democratic Party	SOC
Katharina Focke	Social Democratic Party	SOC
Bruno Friedrich	Social Democratic Party	SOC
Volkmar Gabert	Social Democratic Party	SOC
Klaus Hänsch	Social Democratic Party	SOC
Karl Hauenschild (Note: Resigned in 1980. Replaced by Karl-Heinrich Mihr on 16 January 1980.)	Social Democratic Party	SOC
Luise Herklotz	Social Democratic Party	SOC
Magdalene Hoff	Social Democratic Party	SOC
Jan Klinkenborg	Social Democratic Party	SOC
Heinz Kühn	Social Democratic Party	SOC
Erwin Lange	Social Democratic Party	SOC
Erdmann Linde (Note: Resigned on 28 September 1981. Replaced by Dieter Rogalla on 30 September 1981.)	Social Democratic Party	SOC
Rolf Linkohr	Social Democratic Party	SOC
Eugen Loderer (Note: Resigned on 14 January 1980. Replaced by Fritz Gautier on 18 January 1980.)	Social Democratic Party	SOC
Hans Peters	Social Democratic Party	SOC
Heinke Salisch	Social Democratic Party	SOC
Rudolf Schieler	Social Democratic Party	SOC
Dieter Schinzel	Social Democratic Party	SOC
Gerhard Schmid	Social Democratic Party	SOC
Heinz Schmitt (Note: Died 30 October 1980. Replaced by Helmut Martin Rieger on 13 November 1980.)	Social Democratic Party	SOC
Karl Schön	Social Democratic Party	SOC
Olaf Schwencke	Social Democratic Party	SOC
Horst Seefeld	Social Democratic Party	SOC
Hans-Joachim Seeler	Social Democratic Party	SOC
Lieselotte Seibel-Emmerling	Social Democratic Party	SOC
Hellmut Sieglerschmidt	Social Democratic Party	SOC
Heinz Oskar Vetter	Social Democratic Party	SOC
Thomas von der Vring	Social Democratic Party	SOC
Manfred Wagner	Social Democratic Party	SOC
Gerd Walter	Social Democratic Party	SOC
Beate Weber	Social Democratic Party	SOC
Klaus Wettig	Social Democratic Party	SOC
Heidemarie Wieczorek-Zeul	Social Democratic Party	SOC
