= List of members of the European Parliament for West Germany, 1984–1989 =

Members of the European Parliament for Germany
ECSC delegation	(1952)
EP delegation	(1958)
1st term	(1979)
2nd term	(1984)
3rd term: (West Germany: 1989); (East Germany: 1991)
4th term	(1994)
5th term	(1999)
6th term	(2004)
7th term	(2009)
8th term	(2014)
9th term	(2019)
10th term	(2024)

This is a list of the 81 members of the European Parliament for West Germany in the 1984 to 1989 session.

== List ==
Name	National party	EP Group
Jochen van Aerssen	Christian Democratic Union	EPP
Siegbert Alber	Christian Democratic Union	EPP
Otto Bardong	Christian Democratic Union	EPP
Philipp von Bismarck	Christian Democratic Union	EPP
Erik Bernhard Blumenfeld	Christian Democratic Union	EPP
Ursula Braun-Moser	Christian Democratic Union	EPP
Elmar Brok	Christian Democratic Union	EPP
Manfred Ebel	Christian Democratic Union	EPP
Otmar Franz	Christian Democratic Union	EPP
Isidor Früh	Christian Democratic Union	EPP
Wilhelm Hahn (Note: Resigned in 1987)	Christian Democratic Union	EPP
Karl-Heinz Hoffmann	Christian Democratic Union	EPP
Egon Klepsch	Christian Democratic Union	EPP
Horst Langes	Christian Democratic Union	EPP
Gerd Lemmer	Christian Democratic Union	EPP
Marlene Lenz	Christian Democratic Union	EPP
Rudolf Luster	Christian Democratic Union	EPP
Kurt Malangré	Christian Democratic Union	EPP
Meinolf Mertens	Christian Democratic Union	EPP
Werner Münch	Christian Democratic Union	EPP
Gabriele Peus	Christian Democratic Union	EPP
Gero Pfennig (Note: Resigned in 1985)	Christian Democratic Union	EPP
Hans Poetschki	Christian Democratic Union	EPP
Hans-Gert Pöttering	Christian Democratic Union	EPP
Renate-Charlotte Rabbethge	Christian Democratic Union	EPP
Günter Rinsche	Christian Democratic Union	EPP
Bernhard Sälzer	Christian Democratic Union	EPP
Konrad Schön	Christian Democratic Union	EPP
Leopold Späth	Christian Democratic Union	EPP
Kurt Wawrzik	Christian Democratic Union	EPP
Rudolf Wedekind	Christian Democratic Union	EPP
Karl von Wogau	Christian Democratic Union	EPP
Hans-Jürgen Zahorka	Christian Democratic Union	EPP
Axel Zarges	Christian Democratic Union	EPP
Rudi Arndt	Social Democratic Party	SOC
Jürgen Brinckmeier (Note: Resigned in 1984)	Social Democratic Party	SOC
Ludwig Fellermaier	Social Democratic Party	SOC
Katharina Focke	Social Democratic Party	SOC
Bruno Friedrich (Note: Resigned in 1987)	Social Democratic Party	SOC
Fritz Gautier (Note: Resigned in 1987)	Social Democratic Party	SOC
Klaus Hänsch	Social Democratic Party	SOC
Magdalene Hoff	Social Democratic Party	SOC
Jan Klinkenborg (Note: Resigned in 1988)	Social Democratic Party	SOC
Rolf Linkohr	Social Democratic Party	SOC
Karl-Heinrich Mihr	Social Democratic Party	SOC
Hans Peters	Social Democratic Party	SOC
Dieter Rogalla	Social Democratic Party	SOC
Mechtild Rothe	Social Democratic Party	SOC
Willi Rothley	Social Democratic Party	SOC
Jannis Sakellariou	Social Democratic Party	SOC
Heinke Salisch	Social Democratic Party	SOC
Dieter Schinzel	Social Democratic Party	SOC
Gerhard Schmid	Social Democratic Party	SOC
Heinz Schreiber	Social Democratic Party	SOC
Horst Seefeld	Social Democratic Party	SOC
Hans-Joachim Seeler	Social Democratic Party	SOC
Lieselotte Seibel-Emmerling	Social Democratic Party	SOC
Barbara Simons	Social Democratic Party	SOC
Günter Topmann	Social Democratic Party	SOC
Heinz Vetter	Social Democratic Party	SOC
Kurt Vittinghoff	Social Democratic Party	SOC
Thomas von der Vring	Social Democratic Party	SOC
Manfred Wagner	Social Democratic Party	SOC
Gerd Walter	Social Democratic Party	SOC
Beate Weber	Social Democratic Party	SOC
Klaus Wettig	Social Democratic Party	SOC
Heidemarie Wieczorek-Zeul (Note: Resigned in 1987.)	Social Democratic Party	SOC
Heinrich Aigner (Note: Resigned in 1988. Replaced by Günther Müller on 1 April 1988.)	Christian Social Union (Bavaria)	EPP
Reinhold Bocklet	Christian Social Union (Bavaria)	EPP
Ingo Friedrich	Christian Social Union (Bavaria)	EPP
Otto von Habsburg	Christian Social Union (Bavaria)	EPP
Fritz Pirkl	Christian Social Union (Bavaria)	EPP
Ursula Schleicher	Christian Social Union (Bavaria)	EPP
Franz Ludwig Schenk Graf von Stauffenberg	Christian Social Union (Bavaria)	EPP
Undine-Uta Bloch von Blottnitz	The Greens	RG
Friedrich-Wilhelm Graefe zu Baringdorf (Note: Resigned in 1987. Replaced by Jakob von Uexküll on 5 November 1987.)	The Greens	RG
Benedikt Härlin	The Greens	RG
Brigitte Heinrich (Note: Resigned in 1987. Replaced by Egbert Nitsch on 11 January 1988.)	The Greens	RG
Michael Klöckner	The Greens	RG
Dorothee Piermont (Note: Resigned in 1987. Replaced by Wolfgang von Nostitz on 28 February 1987.)	The Greens	RG
Frank Schwalba-Hoth (Note: Resigned in 1987. Replaced by Wilfried Telkämper on 19 February 1987.)	The Greens	RG
