= List of members of the European Parliament for Germany, 2024–2029 =

Members of the European Parliament for Germany
ECSC delegation	(1952)
EP delegation	(1958)
1st term	(1979)
2nd term	(1984)
3rd term: (West Germany: 1989); (East Germany: 1991)
4th term	(1994)
5th term	(1999)
6th term	(2004)
7th term	(2009)
8th term	(2014)
9th term	(2019)
10th term	(2024)

This is a list of the 100 members of the European Parliament for Germany in the 2024–2029 session. The members were elected in the 2024 European Parliament election in Germany.

== List ==
Name	National party	EP Group	Ref.
Hildegard Bentele	Christian Democratic Union of Germany (CDU)	EPP	
Stefan Berger	Christian Democratic Union of Germany (CDU)	EPP	
Daniel Caspary (Note: Resigned on 28 February 2026 when already appointed to the European Court of Auditors.)	Christian Democratic Union of Germany (CDU)	EPP	
Lena Düpont	Christian Democratic Union of Germany (CDU)	EPP	
Christian Ehler	Christian Democratic Union of Germany (CDU)	EPP	
Michael Gahler	Christian Democratic Union of Germany (CDU)	EPP	
Jens Gieseke	Christian Democratic Union of Germany (CDU)	EPP	
Niclas Herbst	Christian Democratic Union of Germany (CDU)	EPP	
Norbert Herhammer (Note: Replaced Christine Schneider on 11 June 2026.)	Christian Democratic Union of Germany (CDU)	EPP	
Marie-Sophie Lanig (Note: Replaced Daniel Caspary on 27 March 2026.)	Christian Democratic Union of Germany (CDU)	EPP	
Peter Liese	Christian Democratic Union of Germany (CDU)	EPP	
Norbert Lins	Christian Democratic Union of Germany (CDU)	EPP	
David McAllister	Christian Democratic Union of Germany (CDU)	EPP	
Alexandra Mehnert	Christian Democratic Union of Germany (CDU)	EPP	
Verena Mertens	Christian Democratic Union of Germany (CDU)	EPP	
Dennis Radtke	Christian Democratic Union of Germany (CDU)	EPP	
Oliver Schenk	Christian Democratic Union of Germany (CDU)	EPP	
Christine Schneider (Note: Resigned on 25 May 2026.)	Christian Democratic Union of Germany (CDU)	EPP	
Andreas Schwab	Christian Democratic Union of Germany (CDU)	EPP	
Ralf Seekatz	Christian Democratic Union of Germany (CDU)	EPP	
Sven Simon	Christian Democratic Union of Germany (CDU)	EPP	
Sabine Verheyen	Christian Democratic Union of Germany (CDU)	EPP	
Axel Voss	Christian Democratic Union of Germany (CDU)	EPP	
Marion Walsmann	Christian Democratic Union of Germany (CDU)	EPP	
Andrea Wechsler	Christian Democratic Union of Germany (CDU)	EPP	
Manfred Weber (Note: CDU/CSU 2024 lists leader, EPP Group chair)	Christian Social Union in Bavaria (CSU)	EPP	
Markus Ferber	Christian Social Union in Bavaria (CSU)	EPP	
Monika Hohlmeier	Christian Social Union in Bavaria (CSU)	EPP	
Stefan Köhler	Christian Social Union in Bavaria (CSU)	EPP	
Angelika Niebler	Christian Social Union in Bavaria (CSU)	EPP	
Christian Doleschal	Christian Social Union in Bavaria (CSU)	EPP	
Maximilian Krah (Note: AfD 2024 list leader. Resigned on 24 March 2025 to take his seat as member of the German Bundestag.)	Independent (Note: AfD members of the European Parliament voted to exclude Krah from their delegation after multiple scandals.)	Non-attached member	
Christine Anderson	Alternative for Germany (AfD)	ESN	
René Aust	Alternative for Germany (AfD)	ESN	
Anja Arndt	Alternative for Germany (AfD)	ESN	
Arno Bausemer	Alternative for Germany (AfD)	ESN	
Irmhild Bossdorf	Alternative for Germany (AfD)	ESN	
Markus Buchheit	Alternative for Germany (AfD)	ESN	
Petr Bystron	Alternative for Germany (AfD)	ESN	
Siegbert Droese	Alternative for Germany (AfD)	ESN	
Tomasz Froelich	Alternative for Germany (AfD)	ESN	
Marc Jongen	Alternative for Germany (AfD)	ESN	
Mary Khan-Hohloch	Alternative for Germany (AfD)	ESN	
Alexander Jungbluth	Alternative for Germany (AfD)	ESN	
Hans Neuhoff	Alternative for Germany (AfD)	ESN	
Volker Schnurrbusch (Note: Replaced Maximilian Krah on 4 April 2025.)	Alternative for Germany (AfD)	ESN	
Alexander Sell	Alternative for Germany (AfD)	ESN	
Katarina Barley (Note: SPD 2024 list leader)	Social Democratic Party of Germany (SPD)	S&D	
Gabriele Bischoff	Social Democratic Party of Germany (SPD)	S&D	
Udo Bullmann	Social Democratic Party of Germany (SPD)	S&D	
Delara Burkhardt	Social Democratic Party of Germany (SPD)	S&D	
Vivien Costanzo	Social Democratic Party of Germany (SPD)	S&D	
Tobias Cremer	Social Democratic Party of Germany (SPD)	S&D	
Matthias Ecke	Social Democratic Party of Germany (SPD)	S&D	
Jens Geier	Social Democratic Party of Germany (SPD)	S&D	
Bernd Lange	Social Democratic Party of Germany (SPD)	S&D	
Maria Noichl	Social Democratic Party of Germany (SPD)	S&D	
René Repasi	Social Democratic Party of Germany (SPD)	S&D	
Sabrina Repp	Social Democratic Party of Germany (SPD)	S&D	
Birgit Sippel	Social Democratic Party of Germany (SPD)	S&D	
Tiemo Wölken	Social Democratic Party of Germany (SPD)	S&D	
Terry Reintke (Note: Greens 2024 list leader, G/EFA co-leader)	Alliance 90/The Greens (Grüne)	Greens/EFA	
Rasmus Andresen	Alliance 90/The Greens (Grüne)	Greens/EFA	
Michael Bloss	Alliance 90/The Greens (Grüne)	Greens/EFA	
Anna Cavazzini	Alliance 90/The Greens (Grüne)	Greens/EFA	
Daniel Freund	Alliance 90/The Greens (Grüne)	Greens/EFA	
Alexandra Geese	Alliance 90/The Greens (Grüne)	Greens/EFA	
Martin Häusling	Alliance 90/The Greens (Grüne)	Greens/EFA	
Sergey Lagodinsky	Alliance 90/The Greens (Grüne)	Greens/EFA	
Katrin Langensiepen	Alliance 90/The Greens (Grüne)	Greens/EFA	
Erik Marquardt	Alliance 90/The Greens (Grüne)	Greens/EFA	
Hannah Neumann	Alliance 90/The Greens (Grüne)	Greens/EFA	
Jutta Paulus	Alliance 90/The Greens (Grüne)	Greens/EFA	
Fabio De Masi (Note: BSW 2024 list leader)	Sahra Wagenknecht Alliance (BSW)	Non-attached members	
Ruth Firmenich	Sahra Wagenknecht Alliance (BSW)	Non-attached members	
Thomas Geisel	Sahra Wagenknecht Alliance (BSW)	Non-attached members	
Michael von der Schulenburg	Sahra Wagenknecht Alliance (BSW)	Non-attached members	
Jan-Peter Warnke	Sahra Wagenknecht Alliance (BSW)	Non-attached members	
Marie-Agnes Strack-Zimmermann (Note: FDP 2024 list leader, ALDE 2024 Spitzenkandidat)	Free Democratic Party (FDP)	RE	
Svenja Hahn	Free Democratic Party (FDP)	RE	
Andreas Glück	Free Democratic Party (FDP)	RE	
Moritz Körner	Free Democratic Party (FDP)	RE	
Jan-Christoph Oetjen	Free Democratic Party (FDP)	RE	
Martin Schirdewan (Note: The Left 2024 list co-leader, GUE/NGL co-chair)	The Left (Die Linke)	GUE–NGL	
Özlem Demirel-Böhlke	The Left (Die Linke)	GUE–NGL	
Martin Günther (Note: Replaced Carola Rackete on 16 September 2025.)	The Left (Die Linke)	GUE–NGL	
Carola Rackete (Note: The Left 2024 list co-leader. Resigned on 15 September 2025.)	Independent	GUE–NGL	
Christine Singer (Note: FW 2024 list leader)	Free Voters (FW)	RE	
Engin Eroglu	Free Voters (FW)	RE	
Joachim Streit	Free Voters (FW)	RE	
Damian Boeselager (Note: Volt 2024 list co-leader)	Volt Germany (Volt)	Greens/EFA	
Nela Riehl	Volt Germany (Volt)	Greens/EFA	
Kai Tegethoff	Volt Germany (Volt)	Greens/EFA	
Sibylle Berg (Note: Die PARTEI 2024 list co-leader)	Die PARTEI	Non-attached members	
Martin Sonneborn	Die PARTEI	Non-attached members	
Sebastian Everding (Note: PMUT 2024 list leader)	Human Environment Animal Protection Party (PMUT)	GUE–NGL	
Manuela Ripa (Note: ÖDP 2024 list leader)	Ecological Democratic Party (ÖDP)	EPP	
Niels Geuking (Note: Elected after Helmut Geuking refused to take his seat.)	Family Party of Germany (Familien)	EPP	
Lukas Sieper (Note: PDF 2024 list leader)	Party of Progress (PDF)	Renew Europe	
Friedrich Pürner (Note: Independent since 2025, former BSW member}7)	Independent	Non-attached member	
