= List of members of the European Parliament for Germany, 2019–2024 =

This is a list of members of the European Parliament for Germany in the 2019 to 2024 session. German MEPs represent the constituency of the same name.

Members of the European Parliament for Germany
ECSC delegation	(1952)
EP delegation	(1958)
1st term	(1979)
2nd term	(1984)
3rd term: (West Germany: 1989); (East Germany: 1991)
4th term	(1994)
5th term	(1999)
6th term	(2004)
7th term	(2009)
8th term	(2014)
9th term	(2019)
10th term	(2024)

== List ==
On the Christian Democratic Union list: (EPP Group): 1. Hildegard Bentele; 2. Stefan Berger; 3. Daniel Caspary; 4. Lena Düpont; 5. Jan Christian Ehler; 6. Michael Gahler; 7. Jens Gieseke; 8. Niclas Herbst; 9. Peter Jahr; 10. Peter Liese; 11. Norbert Lins; 12. David McAllister; 13. Markus Pieper; 14. Dennis Radtke; 15. Christine Schneider; 16. Sven Schulze, Karolin Braunsberger-Reinhold; 17. Andreas Schwab; 18. Ralf Seekatz; 19. Sven Simon; 20. Sabine Verheyen; 21. Axel Voss; 22. Marion Walsmann; 23. Rainer Wieland; On the Alliance 90/The Greens list: (Greens-EFA): 1. Ska Keller; 2. Sven Giegold, Malte Gallée, Jan Ovelgönne; 3. Terry Reintke; 4. Reinhard Bütikofer; 5. Hannah Neumann; 6. Martin Häusling; 7. Anna Cavazzini; 8. Erik Marquardt; 9. Katrin Langensiepen; 10. Romeo Franz; 11. Jutta Paulus; 12. Sergey Lagodinsky; 13. Henrike Hahn; 14. Michael Bloss; 15. Anna Deparnay-Grunenberg; 16. Rasmus Andresen; 17. Alexandra Geese; 18. Niklas Nienaß; 19. Viola von Cramon-Taubadel; 20. Daniel Freund; 21. Pierrette Herzberger-Fofana; On the Social Democratic Party of Germany list: (S&D): 1. Katarina Barley; 2. Udo Bullmann; 3. Maria Noichl; 4. Jens Geier; 5. Delara Burkhardt; 6. Bernd Lange; 7. Birgit Sippel; 8. Dietmar Köster; 9. Gabriele Bischoff; 10. Ismail Ertug, Thomas Rudner; 11. Constanze Krehl, Matthias Ecke; 12. Tiemo Wölken; 13. Petra Kammerevert; 14. Norbert Neuser, Karsten Lucke; 15. Evelyne Gebhardt, René Repasi; 16. Joachim Schuster	On the Alternative for Germany list: (ID): 1. Guido Reil; 2. Maximilian Krah; 3. Lars Patrick Berg; 4. Bernhard Zimniok; 5. Nicolaus Fest; 6. Markus Buchheit; 7. Christine Anderson; 8. Sylvia Limmer; 9. Gunnar Beck; 10. Joachim Kuhs; On the Christian Social Union in Bavaria list: (EPP Group): 1. Manfred Weber; 2. Angelika Niebler; 3. Markus Ferber; 4. Monika Hohlmeier; 5. Christian Doleschal; 6. Marlene Mortler; On the Free Democratic Party list: (Renew): 1. Nicola Beer, Michael Kauch; 2. Svenja Hahn; 3. Andreas Glück; 4. Moritz Körner; 5. Jan-Christoph Oetjen; On the Left list: (GUE–NGL): 1. Martin Schirdewan; 2. Özlem Demirel; 3. Cornelia Ernst; 4. Helmut Scholz; 5. Martina Michels; On The PARTY list: (Non-Inscrits): 1. Martin Sonneborn; 2. Nico Semsrott (Greens-EFA; left the party on 13 January 2021); On the Free Voters list: (Renew): 1. Ulrike Müller; 2. Engin Eroglu; On the Animal Protection Party list: (GUE–NGL): 1. Martin Buschmann (left the group on 29 January 2020 and the party on 17 February, since then Non-Inscrits); On the Ecological Democratic Party list: (Greens-EFA): 1. Klaus Buchner, Manuela Ripa; On the Family Party of Germany list: (ECR): 1. Helmut Geuking, Niels Geuking (Non-Inscrits); On the Volt Deutschland list: (Greens-EFA): 1. Damian Boeselager; On the Pirate Party list: (Greens-EFA): 1. Patrick Breyer; On the Independent list: (Non-Inscrits): 1. Jörg Meuthen (elected on the Alternative for Germany list; left the party on 9 September 2023); On the Bündnis Deutschland list: (ECR): 1. Lars Patrick Berg (elected on the Alternative for Germany list)
