= Cramon =

Cramon is a surname. Notable people with the surname include:

- Birgit Cramon Daiber (born 1944), German politician
- Viola von Cramon-Taubadel (born 1970), German politician
