= Manfred Wagner (disambiguation) =

Manfred Wagner is a professor and scientist.

Manfred Wagner may also refer to:

- Manfred Wagner (footballer, born 1938)
- Manfred Wagner (footballer, born 1968)
- Manfred Wagner (politician, born 1934)
