= Daiber =

Daiber is a surname. It may refer to:

- Alberto Daiber (1926–1994), Chilean physician and politician
- Birgit Cramon Daiber (born 1944), German politician
- Bob Daiber, American politician
- David Santos Daiber (born 2007), Luxembourgish footballer
- Marie Daiber (1868–1928), German-born Swiss zoologist

== See also ==
- Daibert
