= Kerstin Westphal =

German politician (born 1962)

Kerstin Westphal MEP
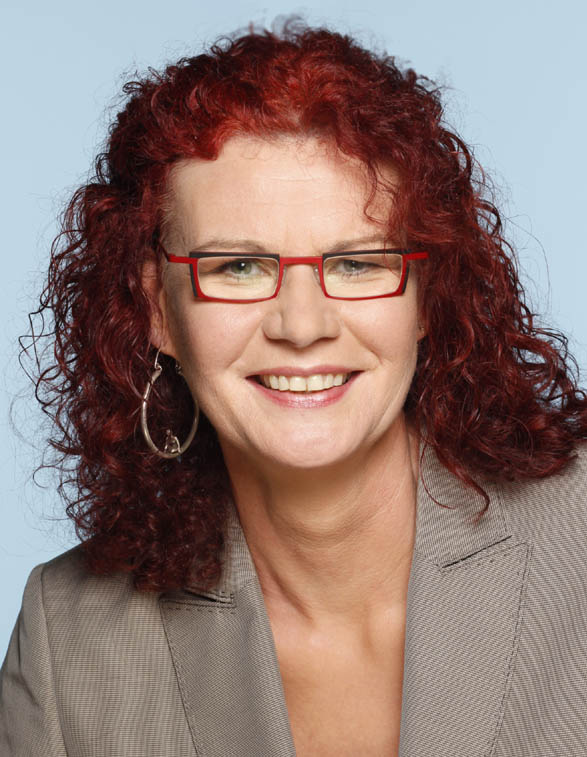

Member of the European Parliament
- In office 14 July 2009 – 2019
- Constituency: Germany

Personal details
- Born: 11 September 1962 (age 63) Hamburg, Germany
- Party: German; Social Democratic Party; European Union; Party of European Socialists

Kerstin Westphal (born 11 September 1962) is a German politician who served as a Member of the European Parliament (MEP) from 2009 until 2019. She is a member of the Social Democratic Party, part of the Party of European Socialists.

== Early career ==
Before entering politics Westphal was employed as a child care worker and nursery school teacher.

== Political career ==
From 1996 until 2008 Westphal served as a municipal councillor in Schweinfurt.

Westphal first became a Member of the European Parliament in the 2009 European elections. She served as member of the Committee on Regional Development and the Parliament's delegation for relations with Switzerland and Norway and to the EU-Iceland Joint Parliamentary Committee and the European Economic Area (EEA) Joint Parliamentary Committee. She was also a member of the delegation for relations with the United States from 2010 until 2014.

In addition to her committee assignments, Westphal served as a member of the European Parliament Intergroup on Western Sahara and the European Parliament Intergroup on Integrity (Transparency, Anti-Corruption and Organized Crime).

Westphal was not re-elected in the 2019 elections. Shortly after, she announced her intention to run as her party’s candidate for the office of Mayor of Würzburg in the 2020 municipal election.

== Other activities ==
- German United Services Trade Union (ver.di), Member
