= Barbara Simons (politician) =

German politician

Member of the European Parliament for Germany
- In office 1984–1994

Personal details
- Born: 16 June 1929 Wolfenbüttel, Lower Saxony, Australia
- Died: 31 May 2026 (aged 96) Hanover, Germany
- Party: SPD

Barbara Simons (16 June 1929 – 31 May 2026) was a German politician from the Social Democratic Party. She was a Member of the European Parliament from 1984 to 1994.

== See also ==
- List of members of the European Parliament for West Germany, 1984–1989
