= Manfred Wagner (politician, born 1934) =

German politician

Member of the European Parliament for West Germany
- In office 17 July 1979 – 24 July 1989

Personal details
- Born: 14 January 1934 (age 92) Hassel, Saarland
- Party: SPD

Manfred W. Wagner (born 14 January 1934) is a German retired politician from the SPD. He served in the Landtag of Saarland from 1970 to 1979, and the European Parliament from 1979 to 1989.

== See also ==
- List of members of the European Parliament for West Germany, 1979–1984
- List of members of the European Parliament for West Germany, 1984–1989
