= Thomas Ulmer =

German politician of the Christian Democratic Union (born 1956)

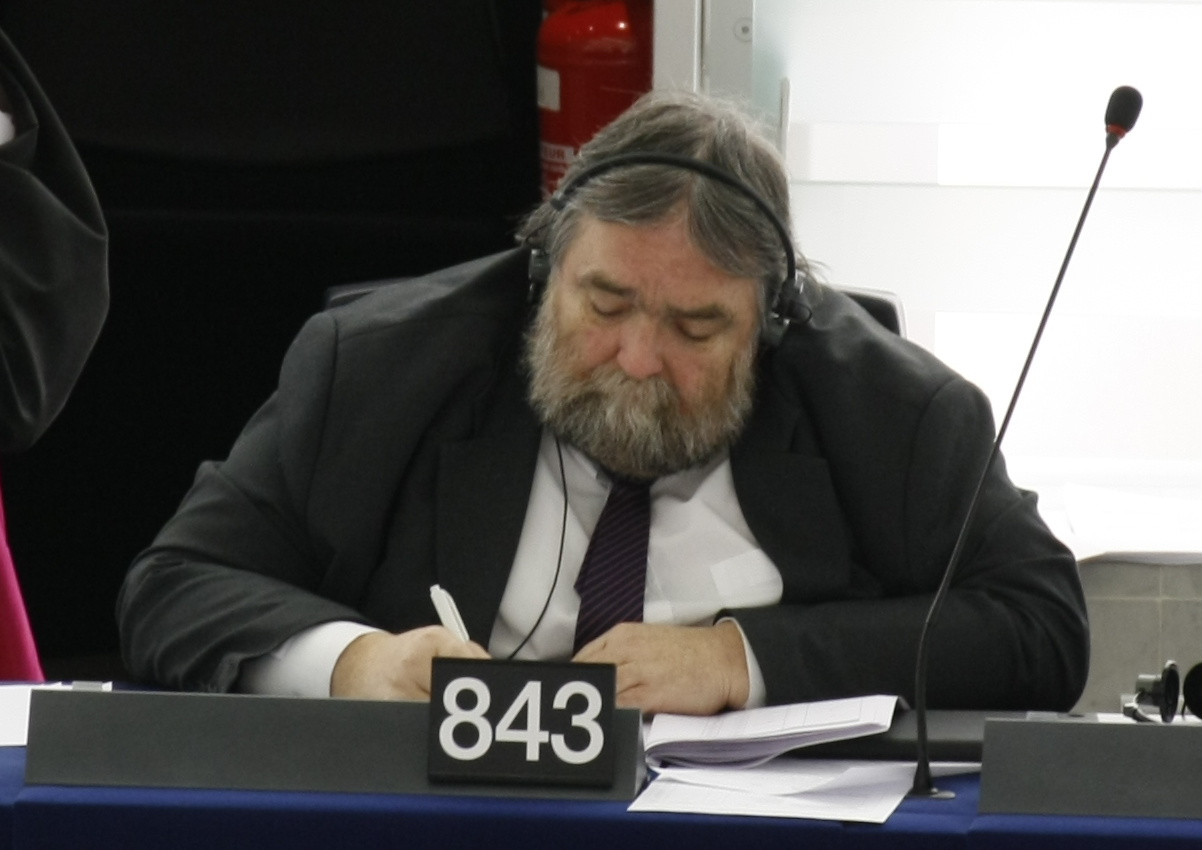
Thomas Ulmer at the European Parliament in Strasbourg (2014)

Thomas Ulmer (born 25 July 1956) is a German politician of the Christian Democratic Union (CDU) who served as a Member of the European Parliament from 2004 until 2014. He was the Parliament's rapporteur on the EU's 2020 target to reduce CO_{2} emissions from new passenger cars.
