= Karsten Friedrich Hoppenstedt =

German politician (born 1937)

Karsten Friedrich Hoppenstedt (born 6 April 1937, in Osnabrück) is a German politician. He was a Member of the European Parliament from 1989 to 2009. He was a member of the conservative Christian Democratic Union, part of the European People's Party.
