= Birgit Cramon Daiber =

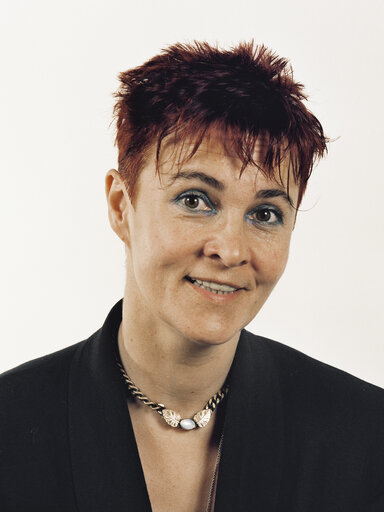
- Birgit Cramon Daiber as MEP

Member of the European Parliament
- In office 1989–1994

Personal details
- Born: 22 August 1944 (age 81) Ebingen, Germany
- Party: Die Linke (since 2007)
- Other political affiliations: PDS (1999–2007); Grune (until 1999)
- Education: Goethe University Frankfurt; Technische Universität Berlin

Birgit Cramon Daiber (born 22 August 1944) is a former German politician and teacher. She was a member of the European Parliament from 1989 to 1994. She was affiliated with Alliance 90/The Greens until 1999.

== Biography ==
Cramon Daiber studied to become a teacher at the Johann Wolfgang Goethe University in Frankfurt am Main and graduated with a diploma in education. Until 1989, she worked as a researcher at the Technical University of Berlin and published scientific papers on feminism as well as on ecological and technological innovations. She was the director of the Goldrausch Women's Network.

After her time as a member of the European Parliament, she worked as an expert for the European Commission and, from 2008, headed the Brussels office of the Rosa Luxemburg Foundation, which she had established.

== Political career ==
Cramon Daiber was active in the Berlin alternative and women's movement and joined the Alternative List for Democracy and Environmental Protection (AL), an independent party that initially only unofficially assumed the tasks of a state association of the Greens in West Berlin. In May 1993, AL and Alliance 90 merged to form the Green Party's Berlin state association.

For the Alternative List (AL), she was elected to the European Parliament by the Berlin House of Representatives in the 1989 European elections, one of three representatives sent from West Berlin. There, she was a member of the Greens group and, from 1992, deputy chair of the group. She was also a member of the Committee on Social Affairs, Employment and the Working Environment, as well as the Delegation for relations with the republics of the Commonwealth of Independent States. Cramon Daiber was slated to run in the 1994 European elections, listed ninth on the Greens' national list, which would have secured her re-election; however, her candidacy failed due to a procedural error in the submission of her personal election documents.

In 1999, she left the Greens and joined the Party of Democratic Socialism (PDS), which became Die Linke in 2007.

== Publications (selection) ==
- Wilde Rede an Europa: Europa ist nicht, was es war; Europa ist nicht, was es sein will. Existiert Europa?. Edition Lit. Europe. 1994. ISBN 978-3-930126-02-6.
- Europa mi amor: Reisenotizen einer professionellen Europäerin. Inselpresse Lindwerder. 2008. ISBN 978-3-939188-06-3.
- als Herausgeberin:Von Revolution bis Koalition: Linke Parteien in Europa. Karl Dietz Verlag Berlin. 2010. ISBN 978-3-320-02240-2.
- Europas Krise im Kontext der Weltkrisen. WeltTrends. 2012. ISBN 978-3-941880-45-0.
- Und sie bewegt sich doch...: progressive soziale Bewegungen, die EU und die UNO. AG-SPAK Bücher. 2016. ISBN 978-3-945959-05-3.

== See also ==
- List of members of the European Parliament for Germany, 1989–1994
