= Martina Michels =

German politician and Member of the European Parliament (born 1955)

Martina Michels MEP
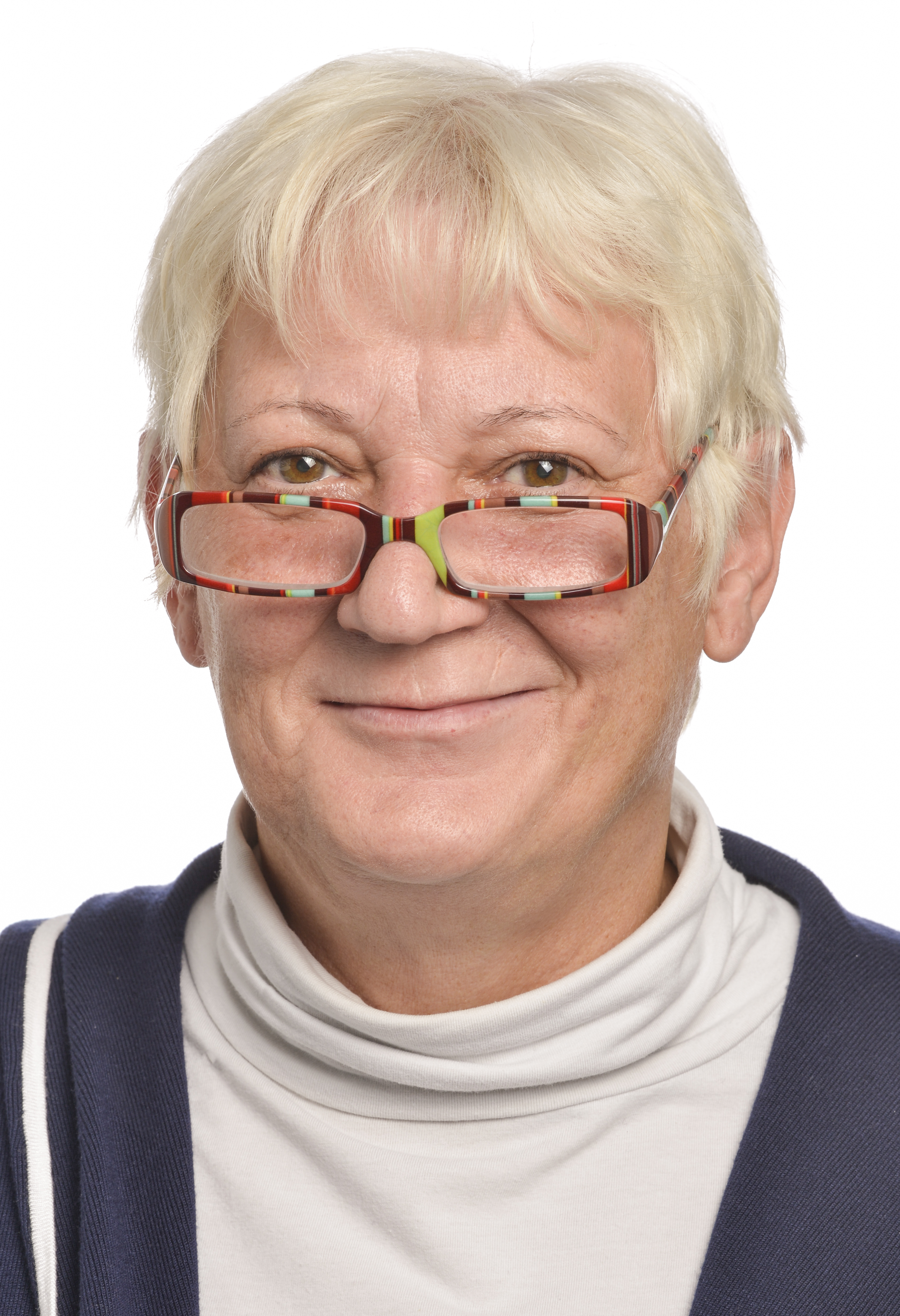

Member of the European Parliament
- In office 5 September 2013 – 15 July 2024
- Constituency: Germany

Personal details
- Born: 1 December 1955 (age 70) Berlin, Germany
- Party: German; The Left; EU; European United Left–Nordic Green Left
- Website: www.martina-michels.de

Martina Michels (born 1 December 1955) is a German politician and Member of the European Parliament (MEP) from Germany. She is a member of The Left, part of the European United Left–Nordic Green Left.

== Parliamentary service ==
- Member, Committee on Regional Development
- Member, Delegation for relations with Israel
- Member, Committee on Culture and Education (2013)
- Vice-chair, Committee on Culture and Education (2013)
