= Kurt Lechner =

German politician (born 1942)

Kurt Lechner (born 26 October 1942, Kaiserslautern) is a German politician and former Member of the European Parliament for Rhineland-Palatinate.

He is a member of the conservative Christian Democratic Union, part of the European People's Party. He resigned his seat in March 2012 due to age. He was replaced by Birgit Collin-Langen.
