= Elisabeth Jeggle =

German politician (born 1947)

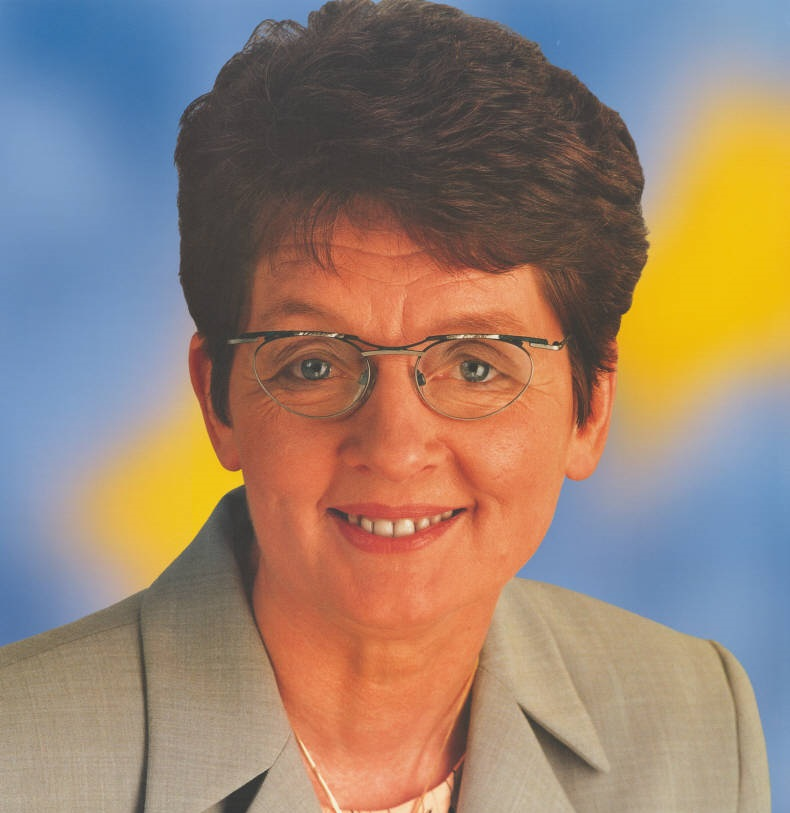
Elisabeth Jeggle

Elisabeth Jeggle (born 21 July 1947) is a German politician who served as a Member of the European Parliament for Baden-Württemberg from 1999 until 2014. She is a member of the conservative Christian Democratic Union, part of the European People's Party.
