= Elmar Brok =

German politician (born 1946)

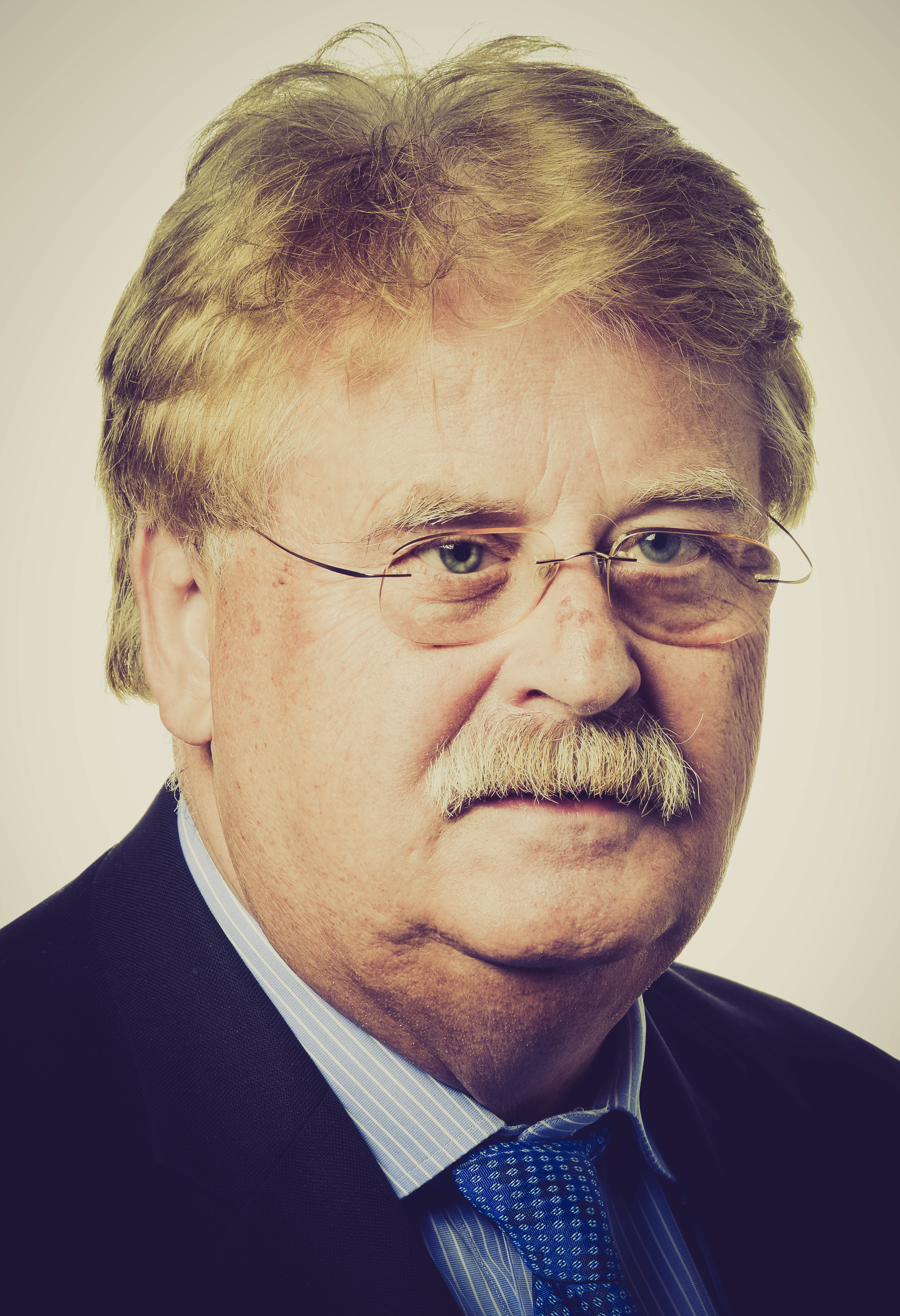

President of the Union of European Federalists
- In office 9 March 2013 – 2018
- Preceded by: Andrew Duff
- Succeeded by: Sandro Gozi

Chair of the European Parliament Foreign Affairs Committee
- In office 10 August 2012 – 1 February 2017
- Preceded by: Gabriele Albertini
- Succeeded by: David McAllister
- In office 5 July 1999 – 22 February 2007
- Preceded by: Tom Spencer
- Succeeded by: Jacek Saryusz-Wolski

Member of the European Parliament for Germany
- In office 1 July 1979 – 1 July 2019

Personal details
- Born: Elmar Peter Brok; 14 May 1946 (age 80) Verl, Westphalia, Germany
- Party: German: Christian Democratic Union; EU: European People's Party
- Education: University of Berlin; University of Edinburgh
- Website: www.elmarbrok.de
- Brok's voice Brok speaking on granting more powers to the European Parliament; Recorded 17 June 1997

Elmar Peter Brok (born 14 May 1946) is a German politician who was a Member of the European Parliament (MEP) from 1979 until 2019. He was the chairman of the European Parliament Committee on Foreign Affairs from 1999 to 2007 and from 2012 to 2017. He is a member of the Christian Democratic Union of Germany, which is part of the European People's Party.

Brok held many leadership positions in German and European politics. As a member of the Convention on the Constitution for Europe and in the Committee on Constitutional Affairs, he is widely credited with contributing crucially to the Constitution of the European Union. He is also a former President of the Union of European Federalists (UEF).

== Early life and education ==
Brok studied law and politics in Germany and at the Centre for European Governmental Studies at the University of Edinburgh. Formerly, he worked as a radio journalist and newspaper correspondent.

== Political career ==
=== Positions in the European Parliament ===
- Member of the European Peoples Party and European Democrats group (member of the board of directors)
- Chairman of the Committee on Foreign Affairs (1999–2007, again 2012–2017)
- Substitute member of the Subcommittees on Security and Defence (SEDE) and Constitutional Affairs (AFCO)
- Co-Chair of the Transatlantic Legislators' Dialogue
- Member of the EP Delegation for relations with the People's Republic of China
- Substitute Member of the EP Delegation for relations with the United States
- Substitute member of the EP Delegation for relations with the NATO Parliamentary Assembly
- Chairman of the Board of Governors of the European Endowment for Democracy (EED)
- Member of the European Parliament Intergroup on Biodiversity, Countryside, Hunting and Recreational Fisheries (since 2014)

Brok has held several other leadership positions in the European Parliament, including Member of the European People's Party (EPP) Political Bureau, Member of the EPP Group Bureau, Coordinator in the European Parliament committees on social affairs, drugs and German unity, and the European Parliament Representative on the Council's Reflection Group for Maastricht II.

From 2007 until 2017, Brok was the co-chair of the EPP Foreign Ministers Meeting, which gathers EPP foreign ministers ahead of meetings of the Foreign Affairs Council, serving alongside Franco Frattini (2007-2011), Radosław Sikorski (2011-2014) and Sebastian Kurz (2014-2017).

Brok was the European Parliament's negotiator at several treaty negotiations including the EU-Treaties of Amsterdam (1996/1997), Nice (2000) and Lisbon (2007), the Convention on the Future of Europe (2001-2002), the European Stability Mechanism (2011–2012) and the International Treaty on Fiscal Stability (2011–2012). In November 2014, he and fellow MEP Mercedes Bresso were appointed by the constitutional affairs committee to explore the possibilities of the eurozone governance reform without any treaty change.

Besides his constitutional work, Brok is best known for his activities on the Committee on Foreign Affairs. He was chairman of the committee in 1997-2007, but ousted after a contest within the centre-right European People's Party by Jacek Saryusz-Wolski, who was followed in 2009 by Gabriele Albertini; Brok returned to the position for the period from 2012 until 2017. He was the Parliament's main rapporteur on enlargement and rapporteur for the EU's enlargement strategy and the European External Action Service (along with Guy Verhofstadt). In 2010, he joined the Friends of the EEAS, an unofficial and independent pressure group formed because of concerns that the High Representative of the Union for Foreign Affairs and Security Policy Catherine Ashton was not paying sufficient attention to the Parliament and was sharing too little information on the formation of the European External Action Service. In a 2013 own-initiative report drawn up by Brok and fellow MEP Roberto Gualtieri, the European Parliament called for overhauling the EEAS and increasing parliamentary influence over the EU's diplomatic service.

From 2017, Brok served on the Parliament's so-called Brexit Steering Group, which works under the aegis of the Conference of Presidents and to coordinates Parliament's deliberations, considerations and resolutions on the UK's withdrawal from the EU.

Ahead of the 2019 European elections, CDU officials voted not to grant Brok spot on the party's candidate list.

=== Positions in the Christian Democratic Union ===
Former Chancellor Helmut Kohl once sarcastically summarized Brok's CV: "born, married, MEP." Brok has held numerous leadership positions for the Christian Democratic Party in Germany, including Deputy Federal Chairman of the Junge Union (CDU youth section) (1973–1981), Chairman of the CDU Federal Committee on Foreign and Security Policy (1989–1999), CDU District Chairman of Ostwestfalen-Lippe (since 1996), Secretary of the CDU Land Executive of North Rhine-Westphalia (since 1996), Chairman of the CDU Federal Committee on European policy (since 1999), Assistant Chairman of the International Democrat Union (since 1991), Deputy Chairman of the European Union of Christian Democratic Workers (since 1991), and Chairman of the European Union of Christian Democratic Workers.

On 15 September 2010, Brok supported the new initiative Spinelli Group in the European Parliament, which was founded to reinvigorate the campaign for federalisation of the European Union (EU).

On 16 November 2013, he was elected president of the Union of European Federalists.

Following the 2013 German elections, Brok was part of the CDU/CSU team in the negotiations with the SPD on a coalition agreement.

== Political views ==
=== European integration ===
Over the course of his political career, Brok has been an advocate of ever closer integration between Germany and the other countries of the European Union. Along with Greek MEP Dimitris Tsatsos, he was one of the European Parliament's two official observers at the EU negotiations that culminated in the Treaty of Nice, a deal which he later harshly criticized.

Brok was an early proponent of having the European Union abandon its old method of leaving constitutional negotiations to national leaders. In 2013, he opposed German plans to hold national referendums for major decisions on Europe; he argued that "[i]f this was implemented in Germany, it would be seen abroad as putting an end to further development of the EU, the EU would become ineffective."

Brok is regarded a critic of an accession of Turkey to the European Union. In 2011, he expressed his skepticism of Turkey's efforts to establish itself as a regional power within the Arab world; in his view, Prime Minister Recep Tayyip Erdoğan is seeking to transform it into a regional power similar to the status it held "earlier with the Ottoman Empire" rather than pursuing the goal of EU membership.

In 2018, Brok voted against transnational voting lists for European elections.

=== Relations with Russia ===
Brok is an advocate of pursuing a "two-track policy with Russia". In an interview with the International Herald Tribune, he said: "Europe and Germany together need a strategic partnership with Russia but in parallel to focusing on human rights, too." Following the assassination of journalist and human rights activist Anna Politkovskaya in 2006, Brok demanded that German Chancellor Angela Merkel speak openly about human rights with Russian President Vladimir Putin. Speaking on European investments made by the Russian sovereign wealth fund and Gazprom in 2008, he expressed uncertainty about the intentions of Russia: "The Russians are just getting going and we don't fully understand their motives [...] That is going to keep the political pressure to do something high."

In 2012, Brok was among the 48 signatories of an open letter to demand that the European Union implement its own version of the U.S. Magnitsky Act.

When Russian leaders, concerned about Ukraine setting course toward Europe, threatened to permanently tighten customs on Ukrainian goods should the country proceed with the agreement, Brok declared that “Russia has no right to act in the way it's doing.” In 2013, he publicly blamed Russian pressure for Ukraine's leadership not signing the Ukraine–European Union Association Agreement.

When the request of Lithuanian MEP Gabrielius Landsbergis to meet with Russian MPs and officials in Moscow was denied amid the Russo-Ukrainian War in early 2015, Brok complained that the case represents “a new level of non-co-operation.”

=== Transatlantic relations ===
Amid tensions between Germany and the United States over intelligence cooperation in 2015, Brok cited the Transatlantic Trade and Investment Partnership as one project that could fail as a result of the frayed relations, calling the tensions “a further blow for all those who want closer relations with America.” Asked why Germans failed to spot American violations of a 2002 accord on sharing intelligence, he suggested that too many Germans working in the BND had “a blind loyalty” to their trans-Atlantic partners.

=== On the United Kingdom ===
Following British prime minister David Cameron's decision to wield the UK veto against European Union treaty change, Brok said it was time to “marginalize Britain, so that the country comes to feel its loss of influence”.

=== Armenian genocide ===
Speaking during the parliamentary debate on a 2015 resolution commemorating the centennial of the Armenian genocide, Brok underlined what he called the moral obligation to recognize and commemorate such massacres: “My own people committed genocides,” he said. “Hundreds of thousands of Armenians died at the hands of the Ottoman Empire's henchmen.”

=== United Nations reform ===
Brok is a supporter of the Campaign for the Establishment of a United Nations Parliamentary Assembly, an organisation which advocates for democratic reformation of the United Nations, "to allow for greater public participation in the activities of the UN."

== Controversies ==
=== Lobbying activities ===
Between 2004 and May 2011, Brok was Senior Vice President for Media Development at Bertelsmann. According to information broadcast by German media his activities as lobbyist of Bertelsmann were also scrutinized by the EU Commission. According to journalist Lutz Mükke (2005) Brok used his influence to ban Hajo Friedrich, who published a critical article concerning Brok's muddy activities, from the political ressort of the Frankfurter Allgemeine Zeitung. In an interview with the German newspaper Die Tageszeitung, Brok reflected his activities and stated that for him politics was not profession, but hobby. Accordingly, critics of Brok call him a "hobbyist".

In 2011, members of the European Parliament Committee on Legal Affairs voted unanimously against a request by German prosecutors to lift Brok's immunity in a tax blunder. Italian MEP Francesco Speroni had been tasked to write the parliament's view on the matter.

=== Femen attack in Brussels ===
On 21 March 2013 women's rights activist and Femen-founder Alexandra Shevchenko assaulted Elmar Brok in front of the European Parliament in Brussels, after luring him outside the building with a phony interview request. Femen accused Brok of soliciting the services of Ukrainian prostitutes and insulting Ukrainian women. Although Femen never disclosed its source, instead mentioning "reliable informations"(sic), the Kyiv Post reported shortly after that circumstantial evidence points to First Deputy Prosecutor General of Ukraine Renat Kuzmin being involved. The European External Action Service denied all allegations against Brok, citing his intensive agenda during his visit. After the assault, one Femen activist was able to flee the scene while Shevchenko was arrested by police officers. Brok did not press criminal charges against Shevchenko.

== Recognition ==
- Grand Golden Decoration of the Republic of Austria
- Order of Grand Officer of Luxembourg
- 2002 – Commander, Order of St. Gregory (appointed by Pope John Paul II)
- 2003 – Alois Mock Prize for the European of the Year
- 2003 – MEP of the Year, awarded by European Voice following a Europe-wide vote
- 2005 – Order for Merits to Lithuania
- 2005 – Order of the Cross of Terra Mariana
- 2009 – Federal Cross of Merit (First Class)
- 2018 – Honorary degree from Lesya Ukrainka Eastern European National University
