= 2019 European Parliament election in Germany =

- 26 May 2019
- All 96 German seats to the European Parliament
- Turnout: 61.38% (▲13.24 pp)
| Party | Leader | Vote % | Seats | +/– |
|---|---|---|---|---|
| CDU/CSU | Manfred Weber | 28.9% | 29 | −5 |
| Greens | Ska Keller | 20.5% | 21 | +10 |
| SPD | Katarina Barley | 15.8% | 16 | −11 |
| AfD | Jörg Meuthen | 11.0% | 11 | +4 |
| Left | Martin Schirdewan | 5.5% | 5 | −2 |
| FDP | Nicola Beer | 5.4% | 5 | +2 |
| Die PARTEI | Martin Sonneborn | 2.4% | 2 | +1 |
| FW | Ulrike Müller | 2.2% | 2 | +1 |
| Tierschutzpartei | Martin Buschmann | 1.4% | 1 | 0 |
| ÖDP | Klaus Buchner | 1.0% | 1 | 0 |
| Familie | Helmut Geuking | 0.7% | 1 | 0 |
| Volt | Damian Boeselager | 0.7% | 1 | +1 |
| Pirates | Patrick Breyer | 0.6% | 1 | 0 |
This lists parties that won seats. See the complete results below.
Results of the election. The map on the left shows the results by district. The map in the upper right shows results by state.

The 2019 European Parliament election in Germany was held on 26 May 2019, electing the 96 members of the national Germany constituency to the European Parliament. Both the CDU/CSU and SPD suffered major losses, while the Greens became the second largest party in a national-level election for the first time in German history.

== Background ==
The 2019 European Parliament election was first national election to be held in Germany since the 2017 federal election, in which Chancellor Angela Merkel's ruling coalition between the Christian Democrats and Social Democrats suffered major losses, while the right-wing, Eurosceptic party Alternative for Germany (AfD) entered parliament in third place. In 2018, the Greens and the AfD made large gains in state elections in Bavaria and Hesse, with the Greens moving into second place in each, whilst the Christian Democrats and Social Democrats each suffered 10+ point swings. Federal polling saw the Greens take a consistent lead over the SPD since October.

== Electoral threshold ==
Since the 2014 European Parliament election, Germany does not have a formal threshold of the vote share required in order for a party to win an EP seat. This has allowed a number of smaller parties to gain representation, since they only have to reach about 0.5% of the vote share needed to get their first seat with the Webster/Sainte-Laguë method.

Although the European Council had recommended that countries with greater than 35 MEPs should introduce a threshold between 2–5%, the German government abandoned its plans for a 2% threshold in November 2018.

== Opinion polls ==
=== Federal level ===
| Polling firm | Fieldwork date | Sample size | CDU/CSU EPP | SPD S&D | Greens G/EFA | Left GUE-NGL | AfD ECR | FDP ALDE | Others | Lead |
|---|---|---|---|---|---|---|---|---|---|---|
| 2019 European election | 26 May 2019 | – | 28.9 | 15.8 | 20.5 | 5.5 | 11.0 | 5.4 | 12.9 | 8.4 |
| Forschungsgruppe Wahlen | 20–23 May 2019 | 1,779 | 28 | 17.5 | 18.5 | 6.5 | 12 | 5.5 | 12 | 9.5 |
| Ipsos | 17–23 May 2019 | 2,072 | 27 | 17 | 18 | 7 | 12 | 6 | 13 | 9 |
| Civey | 15–22 May 2019 | 5,053 | 29.1 | 15.9 | 18.1 | 7.2 | 12.3 | 6.3 | 11.1 | 11.0 |
| INSA | 16–20 May 2019 | 2,875 | 28 | 15.5 | 18 | 7 | 12 | 8 | 11.5 | 10 |
| Forschungsgruppe Wahlen | 14–16 May 2019 | 1,313 | 30 | 17 | 19 | 7 | 12 | 5 | 10 | 11 |
| Infratest dimap | 14–15 May 2019 | 1,001 | 28 | 17 | 17 | 7 | 12 | 7 | 12 | 11 |
| Civey | 7–14 May 2019 | 5,043 | 30.4 | 16.9 | 18.2 | 7.1 | 10.7 | 7.2 | 9.5 | 12.2 |
| INSA | 10–13 May 2019 | 2,044 | 28 | 15 | 18 | 8 | 12 | 7.5 | 11.5 | 10 |
| Forschungsgruppe Wahlen | 7–9 May 2019 | 1,357 | 32 | 16 | 19 | 6 | 12 | 6 | 9 | 13 |
| INSA | 3–6 May 2019 | 2,089 | 28 | 15 | 19 | 8 | 13 | 7 | 10 | 9 |
| Infratest dimap | 29–30 Apr 2019 | 1,505 | 29 | 19 | 19 | 7 | 10 | 7 | 9 | 10 |
| Civey | 22–29 Apr 2019 | 5,013 | 31.6 | 16.2 | 17.3 | 6.7 | 11.4 | 8.3 | 8.5 | 14.3 |
| Forschungsgruppe Wahlen | 9–11 Apr 2019 | 1,282 | 32 | 18 | 19 | 6 | 10 | 7 | 8 | 13 |
| Infratest dimap | 1–3 Apr 2019 | 1,503 | 30 | 17 | 19 | 7 | 11 | 7 | 9 | 11 |
| INSA | 28 Mar–1 Apr 2019 | 4,000 | 29 | 16 | 16 | 8 | 12 | 8 | 11 | 13 |
| Forschungsgruppe Wahlen | 25–27 Mar 2019 | 1,325 | 33 | 18 | 18 | 6 | 10 | 7 | 8 | 15 |
| Forschungsgruppe Wahlen | 12–14 Mar 2019 | 1,290 | 35 | 18 | 18 | 6 | 9 | 7 | 7 | 17 |
| Infratest dimap | 11–13 Mar 2019 | 1,508 | 32 | 19 | 18 | 7 | 11 | 6 | 7 | 13 |
| INSA | 27 Feb–1 Mar 2019 | 4,000 | 29 | 16 | 15 | 9 | 12 | 9.5 | 9.5 | 13 |
| Forschungsgruppe Wahlen | 19–21 Feb 2019 | 1,226 | 33 | 18 | 19 | 8 | 10 | 6 | 6 | 14 |
| Infratest dimap | 11–13 Feb 2019 | 1,503 | 33 | 18 | 19 | 6 | 10 | 7 | 7 | 14 |
| INSA | 25–28 Jan 2019 | 2,056 | 30 | 15 | 17 | 8 | 12 | 8 | 10 | 13 |
| Forsa | 9–11 Jan 2019 | 1,505 | 35 | 15 | 20 | 6 | 10 | 8 | 6 | 15 |
| INSA | 8–10 Dec 2018 | 2,047 | 30 | 16.5 | 17.5 | 9.5 | 14.5 | 9 | 3 | 12.5 |
| INSA | 19–22 Oct 2018 | 1,260 | 27 | 16 | 20 | 10 | 16 | 8 | 3 | 11 |
| 2017 federal election | 24 Sep 2017 | – | 32.9 | 20.5 | 8.9 | 9.2 | 12.6 | 10.7 | 5.0 | 12.4 |
| 2014 European election | 25 May 2014 | – | 35.4 | 27.3 | 10.7 | 7.4 | 7.1 | 3.4 | 8.9 | 8.1 |

=== By state ===
==== Baden-Württemberg ====
| Polling firm | Fieldwork date | Sample size | CDU EPP | SPD S&D | Greens G/EFA | AfD ECR | FDP ALDE | Left GUE-NGL | Others | Lead |
|---|---|---|---|---|---|---|---|---|---|---|
| 2019 European election | 26 May 2019 | – | 30.8 | 13.3 | 23.3 | 10.0 | 6.8 | 3.1 | 12.7 | 7.5 |
| Infratest dimap | 9–14 May 2019 | 1,003 | 31 | 15 | 23 | 10 | 7 | 3 | 11 | 8 |
| INSA | 10–13 May 2019 | 505 | 28 | 12 | 20 | 12 | 9 | 5 | 14 | 8 |
| 2017 federal election | 24 Sep 2017 | – | 34.4 | 16.4 | 13.5 | 12.2 | 12.7 | 6.4 | 4.5 | 18.0 |
| 2016 state election | 13 Mar 2016 | – | 27.0 | 12.7 | 30.3 | 15.1 | 8.3 | 2.9 | 3.7 | 3.3 |
| 2014 European election | 25 May 2014 | – | 39.3 | 23.0 | 13.2 | 7.9 | 4.1 | 3.6 | 8.9 | 16.3 |

==== Bavaria ====
| Polling firm | Fieldwork date | Sample size | CSU EPP | SPD S&D | Greens G/EFA | AfD ECR | FW ALDE | FDP ALDE | Left GUE-NGL | Others | Lead |
|---|---|---|---|---|---|---|---|---|---|---|---|
| 2019 European election | 26 May 2019 | – | 40.7 | 9.3 | 19.1 | 8.5 | 5.3 | 3.4 | 2.4 | 11.3 | 21.6 |
| GMS | 16–22 May 2019 | 1,003 | 39 | 11 | 19 | 11 | 4 | 5 | 3 | 8 | 20 |
| GMS | 2–8 May 2019 | 1,005 | 40 | 12 | 18 | 10 | 5 | 6 | 3 | 6 | 22 |
| Infratest dimap | 2–6 May 2019 | 1,000 | 39 | 11 | 18 | 9 | 4 | 4 | 3 | 12 | 21 |
| GMS | 28 Mar–3 Apr 2019 | 1,000 | 39 | 11 | 18 | 13 | 5 | 6 | 3 | 5 | 21 |
| Infratest dimap | 14–18 Mar 2019 | 1,001 | 41 | 12 | 19 | 10 | 5 | 5 | 3 | 5 | 22 |
| GMS | 21–27 Feb 2019 | 1,006 | 36 | 11 | 17 | 14 | 5 | 7 | 4 | 6 | 19 |
| GMS | 27 Dec–2 Jan 2019 | 1,003 | 36 | 10 | 18 | 13 | 5 | 8 | 4 | 6 | 18 |
| 2018 state election | 14 Oct 2018 | – | 37.2 | 9.7 | 17.6 | 10.2 | 11.6 | 5.1 | 3.2 | 5.4 | 19.6 |
| 2017 federal election | 24 Sep 2017 | – | 38.8 | 15.3 | 9.8 | 12.4 | 2.7 | 10.2 | 6.1 | 4.8 | 23.5 |
| 2014 European election | 25 May 2014 | – | 40.5 | 20.1 | 12.1 | 8.1 | 4.3 | 3.1 | 2.9 | 9.0 | 20.4 |

==== Berlin ====
| Polling firm | Fieldwork date | Sample size | SPD S&D | CDU EPP | Greens G/EFA | Left GUE-NGL | AfD ECR | FDP ALDE | Others | Lead |
|---|---|---|---|---|---|---|---|---|---|---|
| 2019 European election | 26 May 2019 | – | 14.0 | 15.2 | 27.8 | 11.9 | 9.9 | 4.7 | 16.5 | 12.6 |
| Infratest dimap | 30 Apr–4 May 2019 | 1,000 | 13 | 18 | 23 | 16 | 10 | 5 | 15 | 5 |
| 2017 federal election | 24 Sep 2017 | – | 17.9 | 22.7 | 12.6 | 18.8 | 12.0 | 8.9 | 7.1 | 3.9 |
| 2016 state election | 18 Sep 2016 | – | 21.6 | 17.6 | 15.2 | 15.6 | 14.2 | 6.7 | 9.2 | 3.9 |
| 2014 European election | 25 May 2014 | – | 24.0 | 20.0 | 19.1 | 16.2 | 7.9 | 2.8 | 10.0 | 4.0 |

==== Hesse ====
| Polling firm | Fieldwork date | Sample size | CDU EPP | SPD S&D | Greens G/EFA | AfD ECR | Left GUE-NGL | FDP ALDE | Others | Lead |
|---|---|---|---|---|---|---|---|---|---|---|
| 2019 European election | 26 May 2019 | – | 25.8 | 18.4 | 23.4 | 9.9 | 4.4 | 6.4 | 11.7 | 2.4 |
| Infratest dimap | 16–24 Apr 2019 | 1,001 | 27 | 19 | 21 | 12 | 4 | 8 | 9 | 6 |
| 2018 state election | 28 Oct 2018 | – | 27.0 | 19.8 | 19.8 | 13.1 | 6.3 | 7.5 | 6.5 | 7.2 |
| 2017 federal election | 24 Sep 2017 | – | 30.9 | 23.5 | 9.7 | 11.9 | 8.1 | 11.5 | 4.4 | 7.3 |
| 2014 European election | 25 May 2014 | – | 30.6 | 30.3 | 12.9 | 9.1 | 5.6 | 4.1 | 7.3 | 0.3 |

==== Rhineland-Palatinate ====
| Polling firm | Fieldwork date | Sample size | CDU EPP | SPD S&D | Greens G/EFA | AfD ECR | FDP ALDE | Left GUE-NGL | FW ALDE | Others | Lead |
|---|---|---|---|---|---|---|---|---|---|---|---|
| 2019 European election | 26 May 2019 | – | 31.3 | 21.3 | 16.7 | 9.8 | 5.8 | 3.1 | 2.9 | 9.1 | 10.0 |
| Infratest dimap | 8–13 May 2019 | 1,000 | 31 | 21 | 18 | 9 | 8 | 4 | – | 9 | 10 |
| 2017 federal election | 24 Sep 2017 | – | 35.9 | 24.1 | 7.6 | 11.2 | 10.4 | 6.8 | 1.4 | 2.6 | 11.7 |
| 2016 state election | 13 Mar 2016 | – | 31.8 | 36.2 | 5.3 | 12.6 | 6.2 | 2.8 | 2.2 | 2.8 | 4.4 |
| 2014 European election | 25 May 2014 | – | 38.4 | 30.7 | 8.1 | 6.7 | 3.7 | 3.7 | 2.0 | 6.7 | 7.7 |

==== Saarland ====
| Polling firm | Fieldwork date | Sample size | CDU EPP | SPD S&D | AfD ECR | Left GUE-NGL | Greens G/EFA | FDP ALDE | Others | Lead |
|---|---|---|---|---|---|---|---|---|---|---|
| 2019 European election | 26 May 2019 | – | 32.5 | 23.1 | 9.6 | 6.0 | 13.2 | 3.7 | 11.9 | 9.4 |
| Infratest dimap | 29 Apr–6 May 2019 | 1,000 | 34 | 23 | 7 | 9 | 14 | 4 | 9 | 11 |
| 2017 federal election | 24 Sep 2017 | – | 32.4 | 27.1 | 10.1 | 12.9 | 6.0 | 7.6 | 3.9 | 5.2 |
| 2017 state election | 26 Mar 2017 | – | 40.7 | 29.6 | 6.2 | 12.8 | 4.0 | 3.3 | 3.4 | 11.1 |
| 2014 European election | 25 May 2014 | – | 34.9 | 34.4 | 6.8 | 6.6 | 6.0 | 2.2 | 9.0 | 0.5 |

== Results ==
| Party or alliance | | Votes | % | Seats | +/– |
|---|---|---|---|---|---|
| EPP | Christian Democratic Union | 8,438,975 | 22.57 | 23 | –6 |
| G/EFA | Alliance 90/The Greens | 7,677,071 | 20.53 | 21 | +10 |
| S&D | Social Democratic Party | 5,916,882 | 15.82 | 16 | –11 |
| ID | Alternative for Germany | 4,104,453 | 10.98 | 11 | +4 |
| EPP | Christian Social Union | 2,355,067 | 6.30 | 6 | +1 |
| GUE-NGL | The Left | 2,056,049 | 5.50 | 5 | –2 |
| RE | Free Democratic Party | 2,028,594 | 5.42 | 5 | +2 |
| NI | Die PARTEI | 899,079 | 2.40 | 2 | +1 |
| RE | Free Voters | 806,703 | 2.16 | 2 | +1 |
| GUE-NGL | Human Environment Animal Protection Party | 542,226 | 1.45 | 1 | 0 |
| G/EFA | Ecological Democratic Party | 369,869 | 0.99 | 1 | 0 |
| ECR | Family Party | 273,828 | 0.73 | 1 | 0 |
| G/EFA | Volt Germany | 249,098 | 0.67 | 1 | New |
| G/EFA | Pirate Party Germany | 243,302 | 0.65 | 1 | 0 |
| NI | Democracy in Europe Movement 2025 | 130,229 | 0.35 | 0 | New |
| NI | National Democratic Party | 101,011 | 0.27 | 0 | –1 |
| NI | Action Party for Animal Welfare | 99,780 | 0.27 | 0 | New |
| NI | Party for the Animals | 85,809 | 0.23 | 0 | New |
| NI | Bavaria Party | 81,880 | 0.22 | 0 | 0 |
| NI | Grey Panthers | 76,255 | 0.20 | 0 | New |
| NI | The Greys | 71,295 | 0.19 | 0 | New |
| NI | Partei für Gesundheitsforschung | 70,869 | 0.19 | 0 | New |
| NI | Alliance for Innovation and Justice | 68,647 | 0.18 | 0 | New |
| NI | Alliance for Human Rights, Animal and Nature Protection | 68,572 | 0.18 | 0 | New |
| NI | Alliance C – Christians for Germany | 66,327 | 0.18 | 0 | New |
| NI | Party of Humanists | 62,604 | 0.17 | 0 | New |
| NI | From now on... Democracy by Referendum | 58,400 | 0.16 | 0 | 0 |
| NI | Feminist Party | 55,293 | 0.15 | 0 | New |
| ECR | Liberal Conservative Reformers | 43,961 | 0.12 | 0 | New |
| NI | Basic Income Alliance | 40,818 | 0.11 | 0 | New |
| NI | Ecological Left | 35,796 | 0.10 | 0 | New |
| NI | Human World | 34,470 | 0.09 | 0 | New |
| NI | European Party Love | 33,160 | 0.09 | 0 | New |
| NI | The Violets | 27,784 | 0.07 | 0 | New |
| NI | Democracy Direct | 25,449 | 0.07 | 0 | New |
| NI | The Right | 24,598 | 0.07 | 0 | New |
| NI | German Communist Party | 20,396 | 0.05 | 0 | 0 |
| NI | Marxist–Leninist Party | 18,342 | 0.05 | 0 | 0 |
| NI | New Liberals | 15,909 | 0.04 | 0 | New |
| NI | Third Way | 12,756 | 0.03 | 0 | New |
| NI | Socialist Equality Party | 5,283 | 0.01 | 0 | 0 |
| Total | | 37,396,889 | 100.00 | 96 | 0 |
| Valid votes | | 37,396,889 | 98.91 | | |
| Invalid/blank votes | | 410,857 | 1.09 | | |
| Total votes | | 37,807,746 | 100.00 | | |
| Registered voters/turnout | | 61,600,263 | 61.38 | | |
Source: Federal Returning Officer

=== Results by state ===
Results for each party by state.

| State | Union | Grüne | SPD | AfD | Linke | FDP | Others |
|---|---|---|---|---|---|---|---|
| Baden-Württemberg | 30.8 | 23.3 | 13.3 | 10.0 | 3.1 | 6.8 | 12.7 |
| Bavaria | 40.7 | 19.1 | 9.3 | 8.5 | 2.4 | 3.4 | 16.7 |
| Berlin | 15.2 | 27.8 | 14.0 | 9.9 | 11.9 | 4.7 | 16.3 |
| Brandenburg (formerly part of East Germany) | 18.0 | 12.3 | 17.2 | 19.9 | 12.3 | 4.4 | 15.8 |
| Bremen | 21.9 | 22.7 | 24.5 | 7.7 | 7.8 | 4.7 | 10.7 |
| Hamburg | 17.7 | 31.1 | 19.8 | 6.5 | 7.0 | 5.6 | 12.4 |
| Hesse | 25.8 | 23.4 | 18.4 | 9.9 | 4.4 | 6.4 | 11.7 |
| Lower Saxony | 29.9 | 22.6 | 20.9 | 7.9 | 3.8 | 5.0 | 9.8 |
| Mecklenburg-Vorpommern (formerly part of East Germany) | 24.5 | 10.8 | 15.6 | 17.7 | 13.9 | 3.9 | 13.6 |
| North Rhine-Westphalia | 27.9 | 23.2 | 19.2 | 8.5 | 4.2 | 6.7 | 10.3 |
| Rhineland-Palatinate | 31.3 | 16.7 | 21.3 | 9.8 | 3.1 | 5.8 | 11.9 |
| Saarland | 32.5 | 13.2 | 23.1 | 9.6 | 6.0 | 3.7 | 12.0 |
| Saxony (formerly part of East Germany) | 23.0 | 10.3 | 8.6 | 25.3 | 11.7 | 4.7 | 16.4 |
| Saxony-Anhalt (formerly part of East Germany) | 23.2 | 9.2 | 12.6 | 20.4 | 14.4 | 4.9 | 15.5 |
| Schleswig-Holstein | 26.2 | 29.1 | 17.1 | 7.5 | 3.7 | 5.9 | 10.5 |
| Thuringia (formerly part of East Germany) | 24.7 | 8.6 | 11.0 | 22.5 | 13.8 | 4.4 | 15.0 |

=== Maps ===
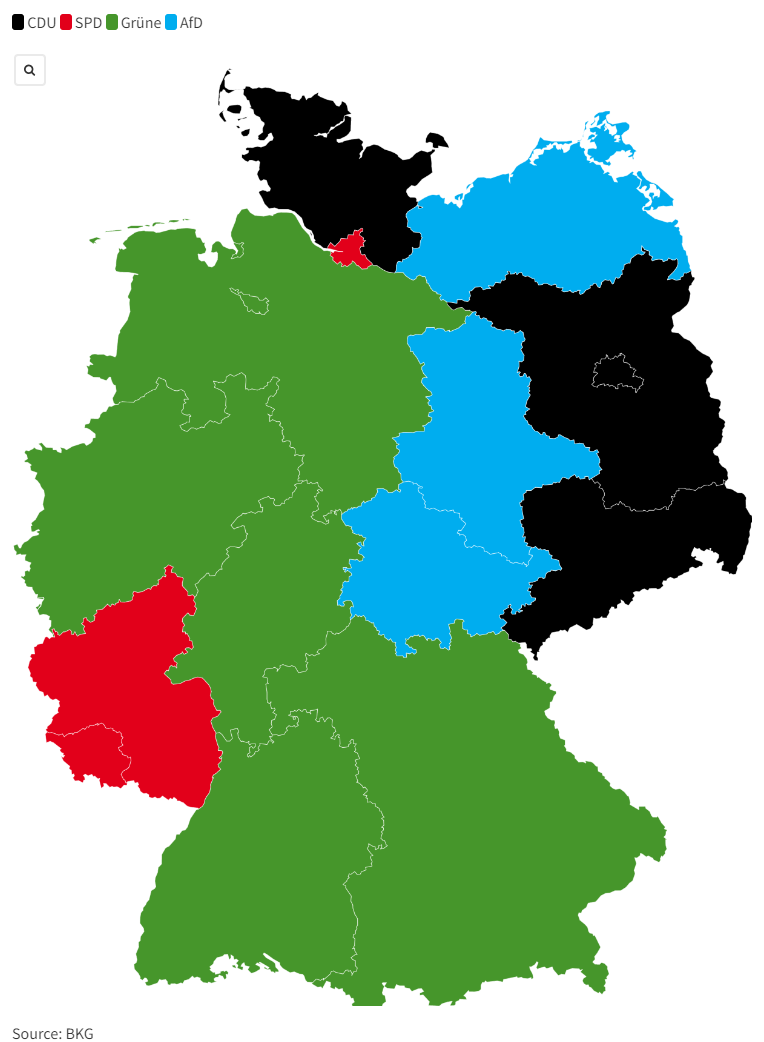
The second party in each federal State.

CDU/CSU vote

Green vote

SPD vote

AfD vote

Linke vote

FDP vote

PARTEI vote

FW vote

=== Post-poll alliance ===
| EPP | S&D | RE | G-EFA | ID | ECR | GUE/NGL | NI | (Germany) Total |
|---|---|---|---|---|---|---|---|---|
| 23 (CDU); 6 (CSU) | 16 (SPD) | 5 (FDP); 2 (FW) | 21 (B'90/Grüne); 2 (Partei); 1 (ÖDP); 1 (Volt); 1 (Piraten) | 11 (AfD) | 1 (Familie) | 5 (Linke); 1 (Tierschutz) | | 96 |
