= 2009 European Parliament election in Germany =

- 7 June 2009

All 99 German seats in the European Parliament
- Opinion polls
- Turnout: 43.3%
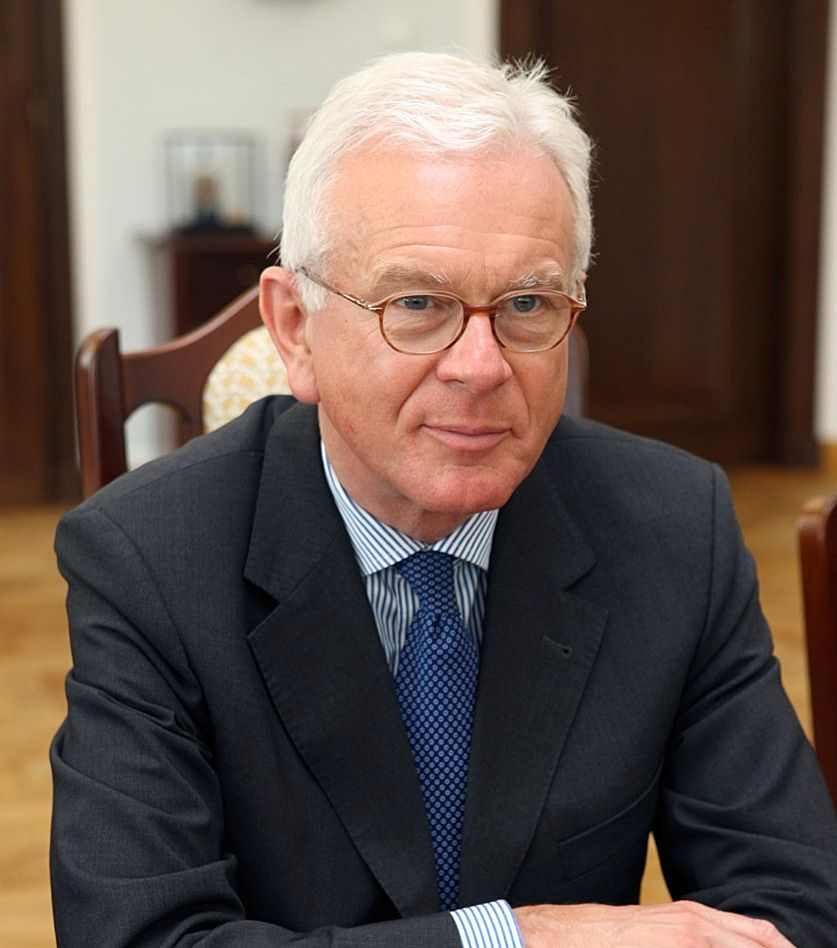

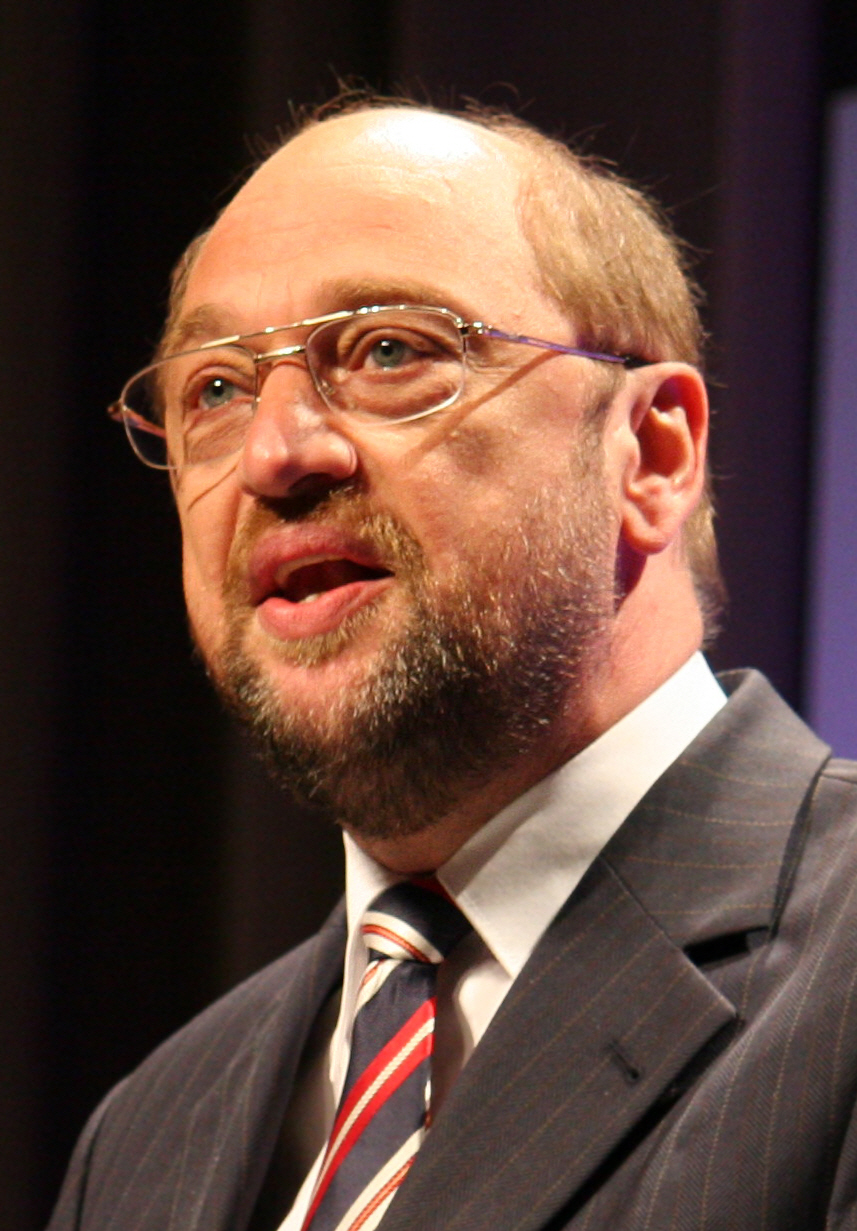

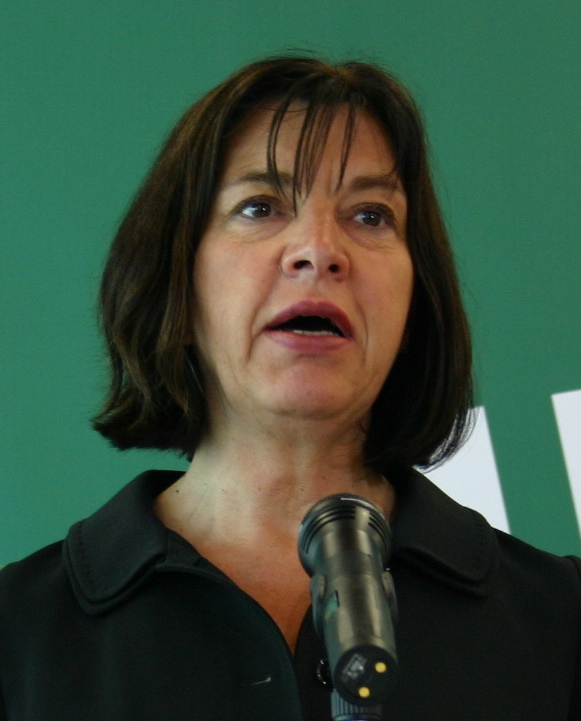

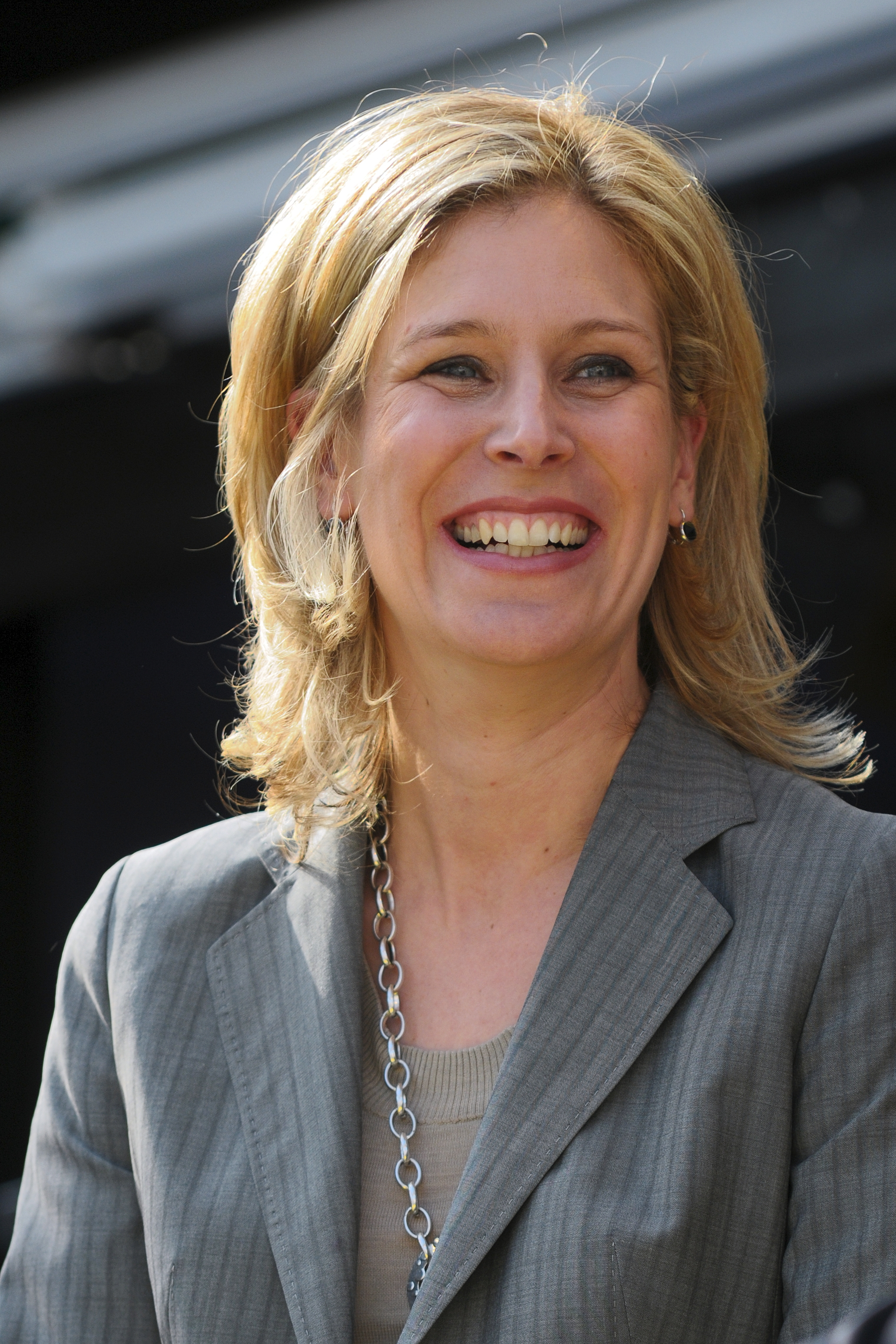

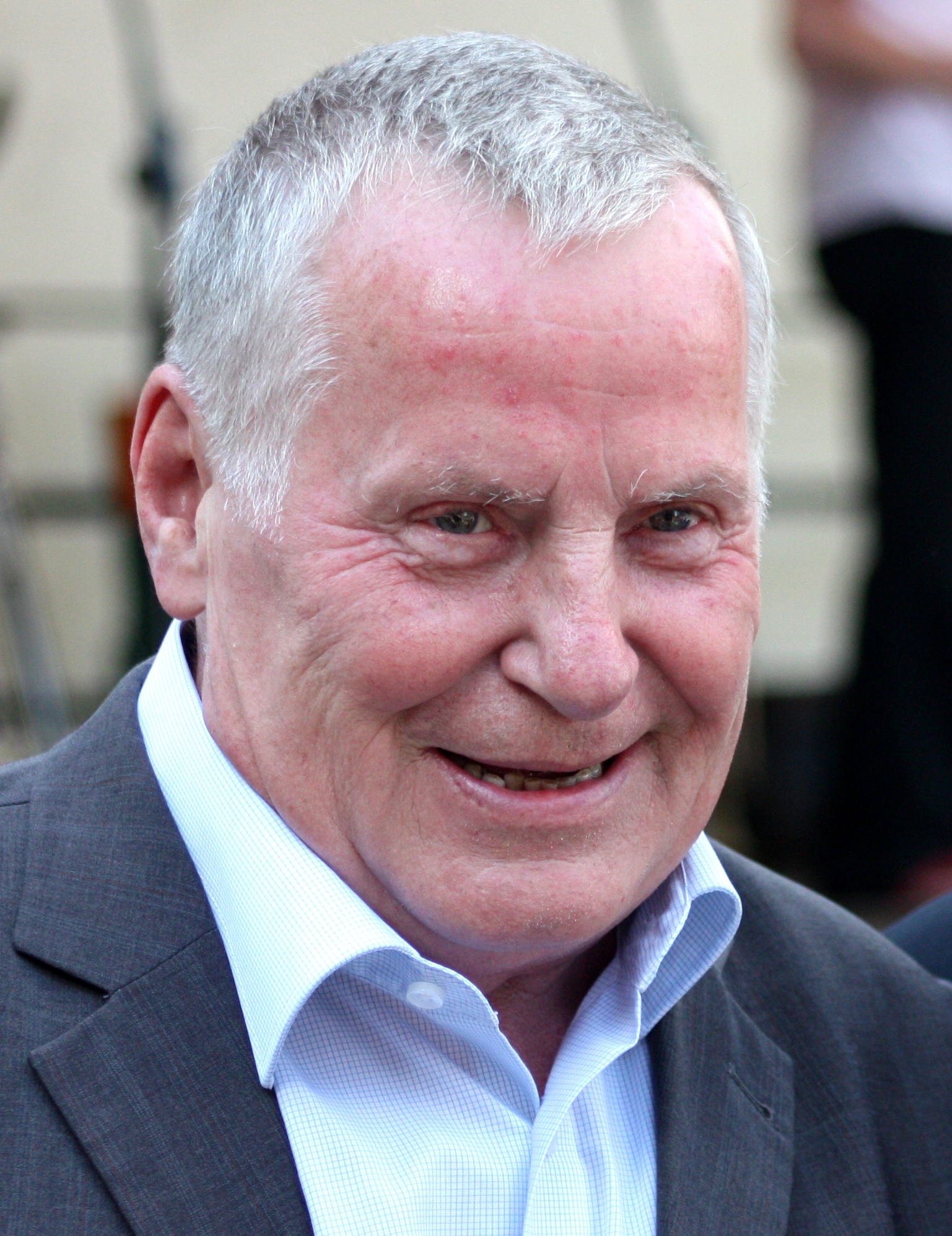
	First party	Second party	Third party
Leader	Hans-Gert Pöttering	Martin Schulz	Rebecca Harms
Party	CDU/CSU	SPD	Greens
Alliance	EPP	S&D	G/EFA
Seats before	49	23	13
Seats won	42	23	14
Seat change	▼7	0	▲1
Popular vote	9,968,153	5,472,566	3,194,509
Percentage	37.9%	20.8%	12.1%
Swing	▼6.6%	▼0.7%	▲0.2%
	Fourth party	Fifth party
Leader	Silvana Koch-Mehrin	Lothar Bisky
Party	FDP	Left
Alliance	ALDE	GUE-NGL
Seats before	7	7
Seats won	12	8
Seat change	▲5	▲1
Popular vote	2,888,084	1,969,239
Percentage	11.0%	7.5%
Swing	▲4.9%	▲1.4%
- Results of the election. The map on the left shows the results by district. The map in the upper right shows results by state.

The German part of the 2009 European Parliament election was held on Sunday, 7 June. A total of 26 parties competed for the 99 seats reserved for Germany in the European Parliament. In the previous election of 2004, the six parties which were represented in the German national parliament (Bundestag) from 2005 to 2013, had entered the European Parliament by overcoming the 5% election threshold. The same parties entered the European Parliament this time. None of the other parties managed to gain more than 1.7%, but together the small parties exceeded 10% for the first time. At 43.3%, the voter turnout was just over the all-time low in the previous European election in Germany (43.0%).

== Background ==
From the 2004 European elections, the CDU had emerged as the strongest party vote, together with the CSU had achieved 44.5% of the vote and 49 of the 99 German mandates. In contrast, the SPD lost heavily and only came to 23 seats (21.5% of the vote). Third strongest party were the Greens with 13 seats (11.9%), followed by PDS (Party of the predecessor left ) and the FDP with 7 seats (6.1%). Since the turnout in European elections is traditionally low, some significant differences can be attributed (e.g. in federal elections) including the respective importance generally attributed to the various constituencies parties European elections of the results at national level.

The 2009 European elections fell in Germany in the pre-election campaign for the 2009 federal election . It was therefore often regarded as a "test vote" for this, in which the various parties first position and, for example, could test the response to specific campaign issues. In the media, however, the European elections was initially compared with other events, such as the election of the President 23 May 2009, rather little present; and the election campaign of the parties was rather unspectacular. Attention was a campaign of SPD in which these slogans as would choose FDP financial sharks or hot air would choose the Left parties other attack directly. Although there are some historical examples (such as the Red Sock Campaign of the CDU 1994), this form of negative campaigning is otherwise rather unusual in elections in Germany.

== Electoral system ==
Legal basis for the European elections in Germany is the European Elections Act, which in many areas of the Federal Electoral Act refers. The choice is a proportional representation, that is, each party gets seats in proportion to their share of the nationwide valid votes allocated. However, only parties were considered, at least nationwide five percent of the valid votes reached. (The five-percent hurdle in 2011 was declared unconstitutional in retrospect, but this did not lead to a redistribution of seats. The 2014 European elections took place in Germany without a restrictive clause.)

Unlike the federal election the voter has only one vote, with whom he a in the European election party can vote or other political association. Most parties entered with nationwide electoral lists to merely CDU and CSU presented regional lists. The 15 Official lists of CDU were connected, that is, the votes obtained were added for the total number of seats for the CDU and the seats then further distributed to the individual lists. The CSU only occurred in Bavaria, but to overcome the five-percent hurdle counted their share of the vote nationwide, they therefore had 33.4% of the Bavarian votes win, with 48.1% she reached the Approximately 36% of the Bavarian votes still would have been necessary because the turnout in Bavaria in 2004 a lot was below the national average for the same turnout in Bavaria and in the rest of Germany as each of the 2004 European elections.

The allocation of seats was introduced in 2009 are no longer following the Largest remainder method, but for the first time after the Sainte-Laguë method . The electoral lists were closed; that is, the amounts attributable to the nominations seats were occupied exactly in the manner specified in the list order. The voters could (unlike, for example, in some local elections do not change the order).

Active and passive right to vote in Germany were all those EU citizens who have reached the age of 18 years at the latest on election day and the German citizenship or have a residence in Germany. German citizens living in other EU countries, as well as EU foreigners living in Germany had to decide whether they wanted to vote in their home country or country of residence. EU foreigners who wanted to vote in Germany, had to leave this app previously in the electoral register.

== Opinion polls ==
Party	Group	Last election	2009-04-03 Infratest	2009-04-22 GESS	2009-05-07 Infratest	2009-05-28 Infratest	2009-05-29 FW
CDU/CSU	EPP	44.5%	36% (30+6)	39%	37% (31+6)	39% (33+6)	39%
SPD	S&D	21.5%	28%	27%	28%	26%	25%
The Greens	G/EFA	11.9%	13%	13%	12%	12%	10%
FDP	ALDE	6.1%	10%	10%	10%	9%	10%
The Left	GUE-NGL	6.1%	8%	6%	8%	7%	8%
Others	Others	9.8%	5%	5%	5%	7%	8%

Of particular interest in the European elections was the performance of the conservative CSU. The party only stands for election in the state of Bavaria, instead of its nationwide "sister party", CDU, where it has traditionally been the dominating party, winning absolute majorities for decades. As the CSU's share of votes has to be above 5% on the national level to gain seats in the European Parliament, it must gain at least 35% of the Bavarian electorate to pass this threshold. While the CSU had still won 58% in the 2003 Bavaria state election, in the state elections in 2008, its share plummeted to only 43.4%, which was only about 6% on the national level. Despite these fears, in this European election, the CSU gained 7.2% on the national level.

== Results ==
Party or alliance		Votes	%	Seats	+/–
EPP	Christian Democratic Union	8,071,391	30.65	34	−6
S&D	Social Democratic Party	5,472,566	20.78	23	0
G/EFA	Alliance 90/The Greens	3,194,509	12.13	14	+1
ALDE	Free Democratic Party	2,888,084	10.97	12	+5
GUE-NGL	The Left	1,969,239	7.48	8	+1
EPP	Christian Social Union	1,896,762	7.20	8	−1
NI	Free Voters	442,579	1.68	0	New
NI	The Republicans	347,887	1.32	0	0
NI	Human Environment Animal Protection Party	289,694	1.10	0	0
NI	Family Party of Germany	252,121	0.96	0	0
NI	Pirate Party Germany	229,464	0.87	0	New
NI	Pensioners Party Germany	212,501	0.81	0	New
NI	Ecological Democratic Party	134,893	0.51	0	0
NI	German People's Union	111,695	0.42	0	New
NI	Retirees' Party	102,174	0.39	0	New
NI	Feminist Party of Germany	86,663	0.33	0	0
NI	Party of Bible-abiding Christians	80,688	0.31	0	0
NI	From now on... Democracy by Referendum	69,656	0.26	0	0
NI	50Plus	68,578	0.26	0	New
NI	Grey Panthers	57,775	0.22	0	New
NI	Bavaria Party	55,779	0.21	0	0
NI	The Violets	46,355	0.18	0	New
NI	For Referendums	39,996	0.15	0	New
NI	Christian Centre	39,953	0.15	0	0
NI	Party for Labour, Environment and Family	37,894	0.14	0	New
NI	Departure for Civil Rights, Freedom and Health	31,013	0.12	0	0
NI	Free Citizens' Initiative	30,885	0.12	0	New
NI	German Communist Party	25,615	0.10	0	0
NI	Newropeans	14,708	0.06	0	New
NI	Europe–Democracy–Esperanto	11,772	0.04	0	New
NI	Bürgerrechtsbewegung Solidarität	10,909	0.04	0	0
NI	Party for Social Equality	9,646	0.04	0	0
Total		26,333,444	100.00	99	0
Valid votes		26,333,444	97.81		
Invalid/blank votes		590,170	2.19		
Total votes		26,923,614	100.00		
Registered voters/turnout		62,222,873	43.27		
Source: Federal Statistics Office

CDU/CSU vote

SPD vote

Green vote

FDP vote

Linke vote

REP vote

Familien-Partei vote

DVU vote

=== Results by state ===
Results for each party by state.

State	Union	SPD	Grüne	FDP	Linke	Others
Baden-Württemberg	38.7	18.1	15.0	14.1	3.0	11.2
Bavaria	48.1	12.9	11.5	9.0	2.3	16.2
Berlin	24.3	18.8	23.6	8.7	14.7	9.9
Brandenburg (formerly part of East Germany)	22.5	22.8	8.4	7.4	26.0	13.0
Bremen	24.5	29.3	22.1	8.9	7.2	8.0
Hamburg	29.7	25.4	20.5	11.1	6.7	6.5
Hesse	36.4	24.4	15.0	12.6	3.9	7.6
Lower Saxony	39.2	27.3	12.5	10.2	4.0	6.8
Mecklenburg-Vorpommern (formerly part of East Germany)	32.3	16.7	5.5	7.6	23.5	14.3
North Rhine-Westphalia	38.0	25.6	12.5	12.3	4.6	7.0
Rhineland-Palatinate	39.8	25.7	9.5	11.2	3.5	10.3
Saarland	35.9	26.6	7.7	8.1	12.0	9.7
Saxony (formerly part of East Germany)	35.3	11.7	6.7	9.8	20.1	16.4
Saxony-Anhalt (formerly part of East Germany)	29.1	18.1	5.4	8.6	23.6	15.2
Schleswig-Holstein	37.9	24.6	13.5	12.7	3.9	7.4
Thuringia (formerly part of East Germany)	31.1	15.7	5.8	8.2	23.8	15.4
