= 2004 European Parliament election in Germany =

- 13 June 2004

All 99 German seats in the European Parliament
- Turnout: 43.0%
| | First party | Second party | Third party |
|---|---|---|---|
| Party | CDU/CSU | SPD | Greens |
| Alliance | EPP-ED | PES | G/EFA |
| Seats before | 53 | 33 | 7 |
| Seats won | 49 | 23 | 13 |
| Seat change | ▼4 | ▼10 | ▲6 |
| Popular vote | 11,476,897 | 5,547,971 | 3,079,728 |
| Percentage | 44.5% | 21.5% | 11.9% |
| Swing | ▼4.2% | ▼9.2% | ▲5.5% |
| | Fourth party | Fifth party |
| Party | PDS | FDP |
| Alliance | GUE-NGL | ALDE |
| Seats before | 6 | 0 |
| Seats won | 7 | 7 |
| Seat change | ▲1 | ▲7 |
| Popular vote | 1,579,109 | 1,565,431 |
| Percentage | 6.1% | 6.1% |
| Swing | ▲0.3% | ▲3.0 |
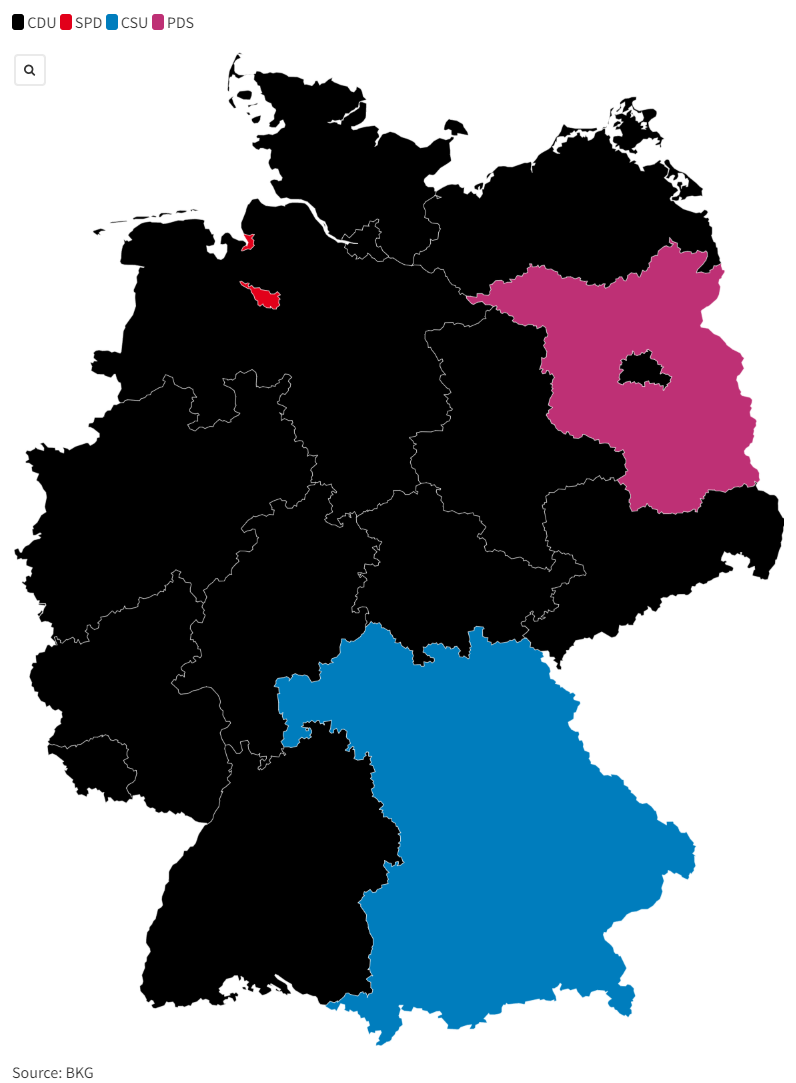

The election of MEPs representing Germany constituency for the 2004–2009 term of the European Parliament was held on 13 June 2004.

The elections saw a heavy defeat for the ruling Social Democratic Party, which polled its lowest share of the vote since World War II. More than half of this loss, however, went to other parties of the left, particularly the Greens. The votes of the opposition conservative parties, the Christian Democratic Union and the Christian Social Union, also fell, though not as sharply as the SPD's. The liberal Free Democratic Party improved its vote and gained representation.

== Results ==
| Party or alliance | | Votes | % | Seats | +/– |
|---|---|---|---|---|---|
| EPP-ED | Christian Democratic Union | 9,412,997 | 36.51 | 40 | –3 |
| PES | Social Democratic Party | 5,547,971 | 21.52 | 23 | –10 |
| G/EFA | Alliance 90/The Greens | 3,079,728 | 11.94 | 13 | +6 |
| EPP-ED | Christian Social Union | 2,063,900 | 8.00 | 9 | –1 |
| GUE-NGL | Party of Democratic Socialism | 1,579,109 | 6.12 | 7 | +1 |
| ALDE | Free Democratic Party | 1,565,431 | 6.07 | 7 | +7 |
| NI | The Republicans | 485,662 | 1.88 | 0 | 0 |
| NI | Human Environment Animal Protection Party | 331,388 | 1.29 | 0 | 0 |
| NI | The Grays – Gray Panthers | 314,402 | 1.22 | 0 | 0 |
| NI | Family Party of Germany | 268,468 | 1.04 | 0 | 0 |
| NI | National Democratic Party | 241,743 | 0.94 | 0 | 0 |
| NI | Ecological Democratic Party | 145,537 | 0.56 | 0 | 0 |
| NI | Feminist Party of Germany | 145,312 | 0.56 | 0 | 0 |
| NI | From now on... Alliance for Germany List | 135,015 | 0.52 | 0 | New |
| NI | Party of Bible-abiding Christians | 98,651 | 0.38 | 0 | 0 |
| NI | Action Independent Candidates | 70,301 | 0.27 | 0 | New |
| NI | German Party | 62,005 | 0.24 | 0 | New |
| NI | Christian Centre | 46,037 | 0.18 | 0 | 0 |
| NI | Departure for Civil Rights, Freedom and Health | 43,128 | 0.17 | 0 | New |
| NI | German Communist Party | 37,160 | 0.14 | 0 | New |
| NI | Bavaria Party | 35,152 | 0.14 | 0 | 0 |
| NI | Centre Party | 26,803 | 0.10 | 0 | 0 |
| NI | Party for Social Equality | 25,795 | 0.10 | 0 | New |
| NI | Bürgerrechtsbewegung Solidarität | 21,983 | 0.09 | 0 | 0 |
| Total | | 25,783,678 | 100.00 | 99 | 0 |
| Valid votes | | 25,783,678 | 97.21 | | |
| Invalid/blank votes | | 739,426 | 2.79 | | |
| Total votes | | 26,523,104 | 100.00 | | |
| Registered voters/turnout | | 61,682,394 | 43.00 | | |
Source: Federal Statistics Office

CDU/CSU vote

SPD vote

Green vote

PDS vote

FDP vote

REP vote

Familien-Partei vote

=== Results by state ===
Results for each party by state.

| State | Union | SPD | Grüne | PDS | FDP | Others |
|---|---|---|---|---|---|---|
| Baden-Württemberg | 47.4 | 19.6 | 14.4 | 1.1 | 6.8 | 10.7 |
| Bavaria | 57.4 | 15.3 | 11.7 | 0.9 | 4.2 | 10.6 |
| Berlin | 26.4 | 19.2 | 22.8 | 14.4 | 5.3 | 12.0 |
| Brandenburg (formerly part of East Germany) | 24.0 | 20.5 | 7.8 | 30.9 | 4.7 | 12.1 |
| Bremen | 28.0 | 30.5 | 22.3 | 3.7 | 6.3 | 9.3 |
| Hamburg | 36.7 | 25.3 | 24.6 | 2.8 | 5.5 | 5.2 |
| Hesse | 41.2 | 24.5 | 15.0 | 2.1 | 7.6 | 9.5 |
| Lower Saxony | 45.5 | 27.8 | 12.1 | 1.8 | 6.3 | 6.4 |
| Mecklenburg-Vorpommern (formerly part of East Germany) | 42.4 | 16.1 | 4.8 | 21.7 | 3.9 | 11.1 |
| North Rhine-Westphalia | 44.9 | 25.7 | 12.6 | 2.1 | 7.5 | 7.2 |
| Rhineland-Palatinate | 47.4 | 25.7 | 9.1 | 1.2 | 6.5 | 10.2 |
| Saarland | 44.6 | 30.0 | 7.8 | 2.0 | 4.5 | 11.1 |
| Saxony (formerly part of East Germany) | 36.5 | 11.9 | 6.1 | 23.5 | 5.2 | 16.8 |
| Saxony-Anhalt (formerly part of East Germany) | 34.3 | 18.5 | 4.5 | 23.7 | 5.6 | 13.5 |
| Schleswig-Holstein | 47.0 | 25.4 | 13.2 | 1.8 | 6.3 | 6.3 |
| Thuringia (formerly part of East Germany) | 37.8 | 15.4 | 5.5 | 25.3 | 4.2 | 11.8 |
