= Voter turnout in the European Parliament elections =

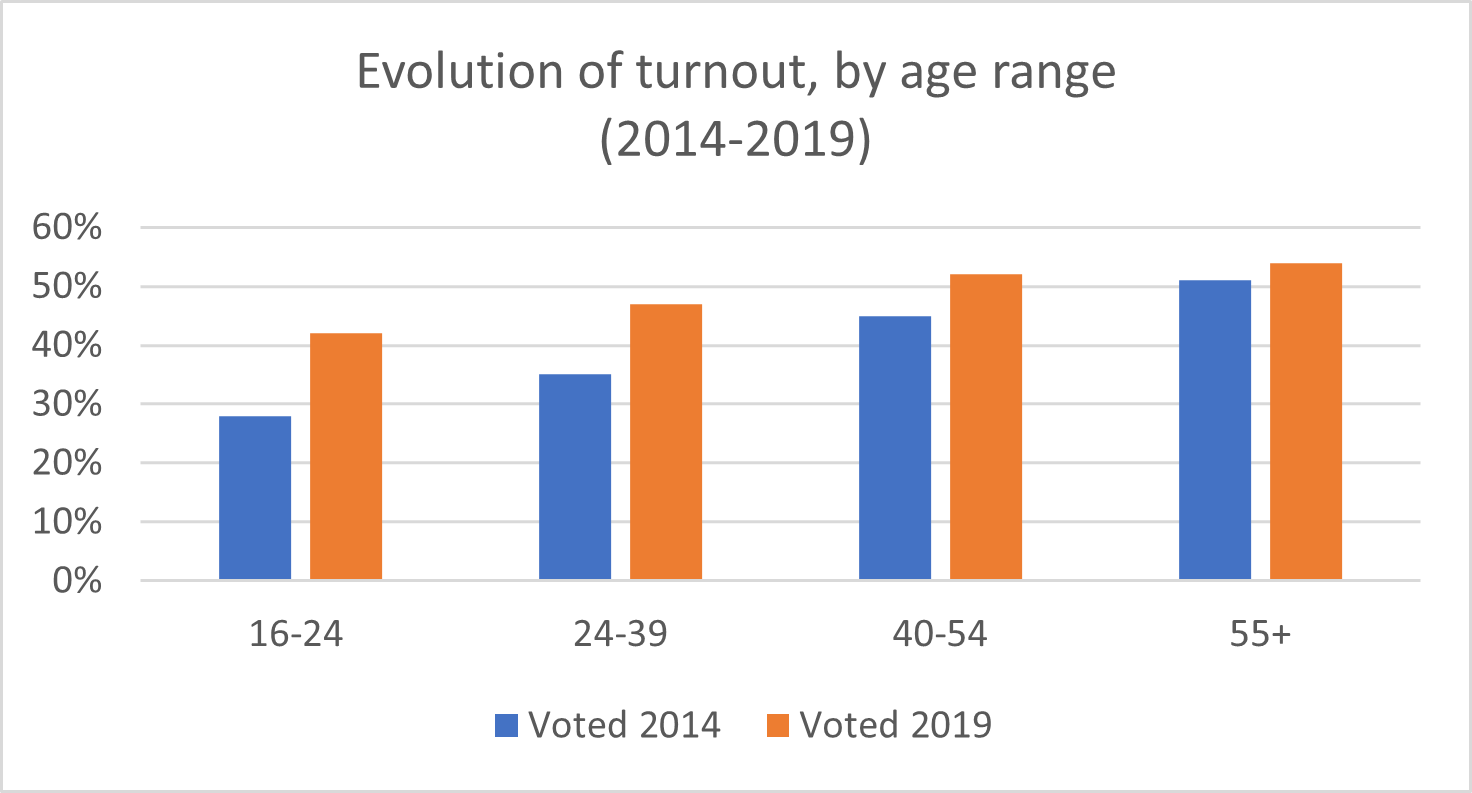
Evolution of turnout, by age range (2014–2019)

Elections to the European Parliament saw declining voter turnout between 1979 and 2014. However, voter turnout in 2019 European elections increased by 5 points compared to 2014 and remained as high in 2024, which some attribute to the politicisation of EU politics in domestic political arenas. In spite of this participatory increase, the degree of electoral mobilization remains weak compared to the national parliamentary elections. Moreover, turnout significantly differs from one country to another in Europe and across a time: in 2019 Belgium citizens participated the most with 88.47% and Slovaks the least with 22.74%. The potential factors that might influence these trends and their implications have attracted great scholarly attention. Identifying and analysing the factors that determine the relative low turnout at European elections is therefore critical, as it is one element that weakens the democratic legitimacy of the European Parliament.

== Individual factors ==
=== Socio-demographic ===
==== Gender ====
While the gender-equal turnout at the national elections in established democracies has been mostly reached "as new cohorts of women entered the electorate", men are still slightly more inclined than women to participate at the European elections. Indeed, in 2019, a gap of 3 points (-1 pp compared to 2014) was still observed between women (49%, +8 pp) and men turnout (52%, +7pp).

This gender gap does not seem to be rooted neither in gender per se nor in institutional features as the European Parliament present a "more egalitarian representation of women than that of its member countries' lower houses". The literature rather emphasises that, because of their "political socialisation", women are less likely to turnout because they express lower levels of interest and knowledge in politics in elections considered as less important (e.g. at the European level).

==== Age and generation ====
In spite of the 2004 enlargements that have considerably "lowered the voting age", younger people have always participated less in the European elections than their elders. An important part of the literature emphasises the effect of "age" or "life-cycle" according to which young people are less likely to vote because they are still in "transition to adulthood", building their professional career and family. Through ageing, individuals acquire more "resources and political experiences", and face "fewer time constraints" and stronger "conformist behaviour of voting" pushing them to cast their vote.

Another part of the literature stresses that these trends might not be "due to age per se" but to "socialisation experiences" through which individuals "acquire the habit of voting to a greater or lesser extent" than the previous and the next generation. Smets considers "later maturation" of "young adults these days (...) less inclined to vote than their parents or grandparents in their younger years". While, until 2014, these explanations have found supporting evidence at the European elections, the unexpected turnout increase in 2019 has been noticeably driven by greater mobilisation of younger people, reducing the generational gap compared to 2014. Indeed, while individuals "aged 55 or over" still represent the majority of the electorate (54%, +3 pp), the participation of "people aged under 25 (42%) and aged 25–39 (47%)", have grown respectively of 14 and 12 pp compared to 2014.

==== Socio-economic status and type of community ====
As for national elections, scholars mainly agree that individuals with higher levels of education, income and socio-economic status are more likely to vote. In 2019, the participation of highly educated individuals (who have "left education at the age of 20 or above") grew from 36% to 39% compared to 2014, while turnout of people who did not continue school after 15 years old has decreased from 14 to 18%. Similarly, the positive relationship between socio-economic status and turnout has also increased through time : employed individuals (especially "managers, other white collar and manual workers") were more likely in 2019, than unemployed people to cast their vote. While a comparable positive relationship has been found with financial situation, (i.e. 54% of voters have in general no difficulties to pay bills) people who have more financial difficulties are also more inclined to vote than in 2014 (38%, +6 pp). Moreover, voter profile was in 2019 more urban than in 2014.

Although these sociological factors are strong predictors per se of political engagement, they only depict one part of the picture. First, while levels of "education and incomes have steadily increased in industrialized democracies during the past 50 years", electoral participation have generally declined in both national and European elections (except in 2014). Additionally, Mattila consider these analyses as "more descriptive than explanatory", as they are limited in explaining the process by which turnout is fostered. Besides, these have been considered to fail to explain why turnout decline occurred while education level or the share of the middle classes increased in European democracies.

=== Attitudinal ===
==== Political awareness ====
High levels of knowledge and interests in politics, sense of duty to vote and "regular consumption news media engage in political discussions" have been commonly considered as significant predictors of turnout. If the explanatory power of political interest increased at the last European elections where individuals with "a strong political interest" were 4% more likely to vote than in 2014 (20 to 24%), a similar increase have been observed among abstainers. However, Stockemer and Blais argue that when related to national politics only "good knowledge", strong interest and a strong sense of duty to vote "might not be sufficient" to explain participation at the European elections.

==== National political Culture ====
Stockemer and Blais found that someone expressing a "sense of duty to vote" only at the national level has 10% less chance vote at both national and European elections than someone that also perceives this duty at the EU level. The last European elections have been "boosted by a greater sense of civic duty" compared to 2014.

Other attitudes towards domestic politics might matter. People affiliating themselves with right or left on the political scale are continuously more inclined to vote in the European elections than those individuals in "the centre of the political scale". Another focus is made on government approval, trust of national institutions, and perceived corruption at the national level. Although a stronger government disapproval clearly does not encourage people to go to the polls, no clear correlation between strong confidence towards national institutions and greater turnout at the European elections has been enlightened so far.

==== Affiliation to the European Union ====
The effect of EU-related attitudes on the participation at the European elections is somehow debated. While some have emphasised pro-European attitudes as more efficient to foster voting participation at European elections, than Eurosceptic ones; others have argued that the significance of such attitudes was negligible if not non-existent when controlling for the sociodemographic and attitudinal variables mentioned above. Accounting for attachment to European identity, Studlar et al. found a positive relationship between stronger attachment to that notion among voters and turnout. In the same vein, analysing the European elections from 1979 to 2009, Stockemer found that those who "consider country's membership in the EU ‘a good thing’ have a higher likelihood of voting in EP elections than those who reject it". Not only the 2019 post election survey has confirmed this trend, but also [compared to 2014] "more respondents (...) voted because they were in favour of the EU and declared this support to be their main voting motivator". Similarly, the literature stresses that distrust in European institutions and their politicians has also been considered as strong motivation for individuals do decide to abstain.

Overall, EU related attitudes focus has also been considered as over-simplistic, treating "public attitudes towards the EU as one-dimensional (...) taking only positive or negative values" disregarding existing "ambivalent or indifferent feelings". Studying 2004 and 2009 elections, Kentmen‐Cin shows that ambivalent individuals - "who simultaneously hold positive and negative [EU] attitudes" are more likely to cast their vote "compared to both negative and indifferent attitudes". Therefore, while bearing contradictory "views of European integration", ambivalent people prefer to raise their voice rather than exiting, seeing vote as an opportunity to improve the EU systems.

Accounting for ambivalence and indifference is even more relevant in views of the "second order" status European elections have for many electors (see institutional factors).

== Institutional factors ==
=== At the national level ===
==== Electoral system ====
Cross-national analyses emphasises institutional factors related to the electoral system. Increasing the financial and moral costs of abstention, the role of compulsory voting in explaining general turnout decline is widely recognised in the literature. Indeed, while in 1979 "40 percent of participating countries" has compulsory voting, in 2019 that system remained active only in Belgium and Luxembourg "so the effects of this variable have become increasingly diluted"

Mattila underlines the role of "open party lists" (compared to strict ones) extending the variety of choices of voters beyond political parties to candidates, that in turn foster turnout. Similarly, holding elections into "multiple constituencies" may encourage voters to participate in choosing candidates they feel closer to ("of their own constituency") and whose it is easier to obtain information. Other scholars consider the patterns of party competition as follows: the higher "the number of political parties" winning seats at the European elections is, the "more meaningful voter choice is likely to encourage turnout".

==== Political system ====
Studying European elections from 1979 to 1999 Studlar et al. demonstrate that "hosting an Eu institution and being a founding member of the European Community," foster "greater EU awareness" that might result in greater turnout. Turnout differences between old and new Member States has attracted great scholarly attention.

Historically speaking, Wessels and Franklin proposed to challenge Rose's thesis that limited voting participation in new members states was due to the "post‐communist" status (i.e. "lack of trust in political parties and governments, legacies of communist rule"), arguing that cross-national differences in turnout are partially due to a weaker "European identity and political community" in eastern states that constrain/limit "political commitment and participation".

Economically speaking, Mattila shows (building upon Gabel's research) that citizens living in "net beneficiaries" countries (i.e. benefiting financially from EU membership), are more likely to cast their vote than those living in "contributor" countries. According to him, the information, spread by the media and the political sphere, that a given "country has to finance other member countries through taxes" might influence citizens' decision to abstain.

Finally, according to Franklin, after the 2004 elections, new EU countries have lost "the boost to turnout that new member countries generally enjoy at their first EP election".

Kostelka and Krejcova show that EP turnout is positively associated with the domestic strength of Eurosceptic parties. The more seats they hold in the national parliament, the stronger voter turnout in the subsequent EP election.

=== At the EU level ===
Reif and Schmitt developed in 1980 the second-order theory, the "most famous explanation for EP elections", that generated a fruitful literature. According to this theory, European elections are dominated by "domestic political cleavages (...) because they happen "at different stages of the national political systems’ respective "electoral cycles", implying lower turnout "because less is at stake" than in domestic elections. Some scholars emphasise the effect the perceived "low salience" of the European Parliament on the decision-making process has on their intention to vote, others underline that for citizens, European integration is addressing issues too distant from their everyday lives "for them to have sufficient interest, awareness, or emotional attachment". Indeed, the EU (and especially the European Parliament) remain mainly non competent of citizens' main priorities ("reduce poverty and inequality", "combat terrorism and organised crime", "improve the quality of education"). In the same vein, Hobolt et al. argue that "governing parties are generally far more pro-European than the typical voter" thus discouraging them to cast their vote. In order to reduce the "second election problem", Bright, Garzia and Lacey, provided evidence that "transnationalising Europe’s voting space (...) would force political parties to move away from campaigning solely on national issues".

Building on this, Van der Eijk et al. stress that European elections (unlike national ones) "are less important precisely because they play no role in deciding who governs the country". As a response to the continuous turnout decline, the spizenkanditat process during 2014 European elections was expected to establish a direct "electoral connection" between the voters and the appointment of the president of the commission. Such personalisation was intended to ensure ‘public identification of the options on the EU table and the winners and losers in the EU. While electoral participation increased in some countries, whether this was due to this phenomenon or to others factors' role is still a debated issue. Moreover, as the majority of voters did not show up in 2014, Hobolt concludes that this process did not have a significant impact on voter attitudes who happened to be less interested in the choice of candidates than expected.

== Contextual factors ==
=== Context of the election ===
Taking a step back from the rational-choice approach, some studies analyse the impact of contextual factors on turnout. "Sunday voting", has been found to increase turnout as it decreases the cost of voting. Similarly, closeness to another election and shorter "time until next elections" should grow the incentives for parties to mobilize their supporters, which should lead to higher turnout". Other "circumstantial reasons for abstention" have been considered such as "pressure of work, being too busy, or simply ‘having no time’, which together account for 29% of circumstantial abstention".

=== Media and public sphere ===
Some scholars consider the so-called "communication deficit" as partially responsible for the low public interest and turnout at the European elections. Greater positive media coverage of European issues, actors and electoral campaigns have been associated with higher turnout, (even if scepticism remains). Media coverage has, before 2014 elections, "increasingly integrated Europeanized public sphere" : across Member States, citizens had access to similar "European issues, European actors and EU responsibility" while "the national framing also remained dominant". This trend has also been observed in the post electoral survey of 2019 when "44% of respondents recalled seeing or hearing messages from the European Parliament encouraging citizens to vote. This recall is highest among respondents who actually voted in the elections (50%), but also 39% of non-voters recall having seen or heard elements of Parliament's go-to-vote message. ".

Focusing only on political communication through the media and political discussion, some scholars admit the limits of their approach leading too often " to ‘blame the messenger’ for more deep-rooted ills of the body politic". An accurate understanding of rising abstention at the European elections cannot be conducted without accounting for the role of other mobilizing agencies "such as political parties in activating support".

Thus, scholars debate on the impact that exposure to electoral campaign has on turnout at the European elections. A large part of the literature found evidence that the mobilisation through campaigning is more efficient at the national than at the EU level.

Through the "mobilization deficit hypothesis", Wessels and Franklin found that strong campaigning efforts to spread information through the media and to mobilize voters significantly foster turnout. Building upon this framework, Marquart and Goldberg propose to distinguish "citizens’ passive exposure" ("to media coverage of the EP election campaign and targeted efforts of parties") from "active engagement " (i.e. information research or engagement within an electoral campaign). They found that for boosting abstainer to change their mind, "active engagement" is more efficient than "exposure to political posters" which is not sufficient. Furthermore, they stressed "a potentially ‘toxic’ information and communication environment on social media, in which the diversity of opinions and information also increases the likelihood that citizens are exposed to critical content about the Union" and thus not go to the polls.

== Implications ==
=== On parties' share ===
Traditional right and left-wing parties that have dominated post-war European politics have continuously lost voters. Between 2014 and 2019 the Christian Democrats (EPP) and the Social Democrats lost 39 and 37 seats respectively.

As an explanation, Hix and Harsh emphasise that the European elections are seen as an opportunity by voters to punish parties in government. Party size might also have an effect: "the larger a political party is, in terms of its vote-share in the previous national election, the more votes it will lose in the subsequent European election".

Alternatively, van der Eijk and Egmond argue that turnout impact differs according to the placement of parties on the political scale. While "right-wing parties benefit slightly from them (on average) and left-wing parties are (on average) somewhat hurt". In countries such as France, the United Kingdom, Denmark or Austria, this phenomenon has been correlated to "the support of the established protagonists of the populist radical right, such as the French National Rally (RN), the UK Independence Party (UKIP), the Danish People's Party (DF) or the Freedom Party of Austria (FPÖ)".

Studying abstainers' electoral choices at the 2009 and 2014 European elections, Remer-Bollowa, Bernhagena and Rose simulations forecast that "left-leaning and ideologically moderate parties would gain if turnout went up to levels observed at first-order national elections" while "Eurosceptic or Europhile parties" that "would not been affected". The turnout increase (especially of young people) at the 2019 European elections seems to partially support this thesis with "the success in several countries of the green candidates and the failure of populist parties to achieve an electoral breakthrough".

=== On the EU political system: democratic deficit ===
The strong abstention at the European parliament elections is considered as undermining the democratic nature of European Union as a whole "because it calls legitimacy into question or because low turnout implies lack of representation of certain groups". Indeed, support for populist parties partially stems from the voters' perception that the European institutions are not sufficiently democratic. Limited turnout is also seen as eroding EU's credibility to promote democracy abroad through projects "that strictly apply the principles of democracy and human rights".
