= Fabrizio Gilardi =

Swiss political scientist

- Born: 1975 (age 50–51)
- Citizenship: Swiss
- Education: University of Lausanne (PhD), University of Geneva (MA, BA)
- Known for: works on policy analysis
- Awards: Jean Monnet Fellowship (declined)
- Scientific career
- Fields: political science
- Institutions: University of Zurich
- Thesis: Delegation to Independent Regulatory Agencies in Western Europe (2004)
- Website: www.fabriziogilardi.org

Fabrizio Gilardi (born 1975) is a Swiss political scientist and professor of policy analysis at the University of Zurich. He is known for his works on delegation theory, research design and policy diffusion processes. He is a former editor of the Journal of Public Policy (2014–2019) and DeFacto (2015–2019).

== Books ==
- Maggetti, Martino, Fabrizio Gilardi and Claudio M. Radaelli (2013), Designing Research in the Social Sciences, SAGE
- Gilardi, Fabrizio (2008), Delegation in the Regulatory State: Independent Regulatory Agencies in Western Europe, Edward Elgar
- Braun, Dietmar and Fabrizio Gilardi (eds) (2006), Delegation in Contemporary Democracies, Routledge
