= Giacomo Benedetto =

British Italian political scientist (born 1972)

Giacomo Benedetto FRSA
- Born: 1972 (age 53–54)
- Occupation: Jean Monnet Chair
- Awards: Fellow of the Royal Society of Arts

Academic background
- Education: University of Sussex (BA); London School of Economics (MSc, PhD)
- Thesis: Institutionalised Consensus in Europe's Parliament (2005)
- Doctoral advisor: Simon Hix

Academic work
- Discipline: Political science, Public policy, European studies
- Sub-discipline: EU budget
- Institutions: Royal Holloway, University of London; University of Manchester
- Website: pure.royalholloway.ac.uk/portal/en/persons/giacomo-benedetto_7d67c091-a49e-4942-a656-a4b431769845.html

Giacomo Benedetto (born August 1972) is a British-Italian political scientist and holder of a Jean Monnet Chair at Royal Holloway, University of London. He is an expert in European Union politics, and has researched and published extensively on the European Parliament, Euroscepticism, and the EU budget.

== Early life and academic career ==
Benedetto completed his undergraduate studies at the University of Sussex and his graduate studies at the London School of Economics and Political Science, from which he earned an MSc(Econ) and a PhD. His doctoral thesis (2005), under the supervision of Simon Hix, dealt with Institutionalised Consensus in Europe's Parliament. Benedetto started his academic career as a lecturer at the University of Manchester in 2005. He joined Royal Holloway, University of London, in 2006, and was appointed Jean Monnet Chair in 2016, with an inaugural lecture entitled £350 million per week and why Europe needs a budget.

== Achievements ==
As an expert in EU budgetary politics, Benedetto is co-author of the Study on the Potential and Limitations of Reforming the Financing of the EU Budget prepared for the EU's High Level Group on Own Resources, the so-called Monti Group. As a Jean Monnet Chair, he was also invited to provide oral evidence on Brexit and the EU budget by the House of Lords EU financial affairs sub-committee of the select committee on the European Union, and to provide written evidence for the European Parliament Committee on Budgets on the EU budget during the previous decade. For the election of new parliamentarians in 2019, the European Parliament commissioned Benedetto to author a History of the EU Budget, which was published in 23 languages.

== Selected works ==
- Benedetto, G., & S. Milio (eds) (2012), European Union budget reform: institutions, policy and economic crisis. Palgrave Macmillan.
- Benedetto, G. (2013), "The EU budget after Lisbon: Rigidity and reduced spending?" Journal of Public Policy 33(3): 345–369.
- Nuñez Ferrer, J., J. Le Cacheux, G. Benedetto, & M. Saunier (2016), Study on the Potential and Limitations of Reforming the Financing of the EU Budget: Expertise commissioned by the European Commission on behalf of the High Level Group on Own Resources. Centre for European Policy Studies.
- Benedetto, G. (2017), "Institutions and the route to reform of the European Union's budget revenue", Empirica 44(4): 615–633.
- Benedetto, G. (2017), "Power, money and reversion points: The European Union's annual budgets since 2010", Journal of European Public Policy 24(5): 633–652.
- Benedetto, G. (2019), "The European Parliament as a budgetary extractor since the Lisbon Treaty", Journal of European Integration 41(3): 329–345.
- Benedetto, G. (2019), The History of the EU Budget, European Parliament.
- Benedetto, G, S. Hix, & N. Mastrorocco (2020), "The Rise and Fall of Social Democracy, 1918-2017", American Political Science Review 114(3): 928–939.
