= Giandomenico Majone =

Italian scholar of political science (born 1932)

- Born: 27 March 1932; Italy
- Occupation: Academic

Academic background
- Education: University of California, Berkeley
- Thesis: Asymptotic behavior of Bayes' estimates in Borel sets (1966)

Academic work
- Discipline: Political science
- Institutions: European University Institute
- Doctoral students: Simon Hix

Giandomenico Majone (born 27 March 1932) is an Italian scholar of political science whose expertise was regulatory governance within the European Union (EU) as well as theories of delegation and their effect on the perceived democratic deficit of the EU. He was an Emeritus Professor of Public Policy at the European University Institute in Florence, Italy.

== Education ==
Majone studied at the University of Padua in the early 1950s acquiring a Master of Arts in political economy in 1956, before enrolling at the Carnegie Institute of Technology, where he received a Master of Science degree in mathematics in 1960. In the early 1960s he studied at the University of California, Berkeley where he earned a doctorate in statistics in 1965. In 1986 he was appointed professor of public policy analysis at the European University Institute (EUI), a post he held until 1995. Following this, he held a position as an external professor at the EUI in addition to that of visiting distinguished professor at the EU Center and Graduate School of Public and International Affairs at the University of Pittsburgh.

== Scholarship ==
Majone has written on a wide variety of subjects, but his most notable contribution concerns the EU's delegation of regulatory powers. In brief, Majone conceives of the delegation of regulatory powers to supranational institutions such as the European Commission as a means for member states to credibly commit to integration and implementing EU policies. Majone asserts that the scope of EU powers are primarily regulatory and contrasts delegation to the commission with national forms of delegation such as that to an independent central bank.

According to Majone, member states delegate certain regulatory powers to the Commission in order to insulate themselves from democratic pressures that would inhibit optimal policy outcomes, such as "shifting political property rights", whereby the commitments made by one government can be undone by a newly elected one, and "time inconsistency", where the optimal short-term policy may run counter to the optimal long-term policy. These problems indicate that decisions about purely regulatory matters should be made by institutions that are not democratically accountable. For example, although a policy of maintaining low inflation may be the best long-term policy, governments facing elections are motivated to lower interest rates and manufacture short-term economic "booms".

In the context of the EU, Majone interprets this as a defence of the perceived undemocratic nature of institutions like the European Commission and a warning against the introducing democratic reforms like a directly elected Commission President as it could undermine the functions of the supranational institutions.

== The Giandomenico Majone Prize ==
The Giandomenico Majone Prize was in honour of Giandomenico Majone for his outstanding contribution for the study of regulatory governance in the EU or beyond. This award recognises outstanding research by scholars in early stages of her or his career in the field of regulatory governance from all relevant disciplinary backgrounds. The Prize was limited to scholars having completed their PhD no more than seven years before the deadline for submission. The prize was awarded by the European Consortium for Political Research's Standing Group on Regulatory Governance.

== Select bibliography ==
- Europe as the Would-be World Power: The EU at Fifty. Cambridge University Press. 2009. ISBN 978-0946535811.
- Dilemmas of European Integration: The Ambiguities and Pitfalls of Integration by Stealth. Oxford University Press. 2005. ISBN 978-0199556809.
- Regulating Europe. Routledge Research in European Public Policy. Taylor & Francis. 1996. ISBN 978-0415142960.
- The European Community as a Regulatory State, published by Nijhoff in the Series of Lectures of the Academy of European Law, 1995.
- Evidence, Argument, and Persuasion in the Policy Process, Evidence, Argument, and Persuasion in the Policy Process. New Haven, CT: Yale University Press. 1992. ISBN 978-0300052596.
- Deregulation or re-regulation?: Regulatory reform in Europe and the United States. St. Martin's Press. 1990. ISBN 978-0861878345.
- Jean Monnet et l'Europe d'aujourd'hui. Baden Baden: Nomos. 1989. ISBN 978-3789018206.
- Guidance, Control and Evaluation in the Public Sector: The Bielefeld Interdisciplinary Project. Berlin: Walter de Gruyter. 1985. ISBN 978-3110097078. (with Franz-Xaver Kaufmann and Vincent Ostrom, eds.)
- Pitfalls of Analysis. International Series on Applied Systems Analysis. London: John Wiley & Sons. 1980. ISBN 978-0471277460. (with Edward S. Quade, ed.)

== See also ==
- Regulation (European Union)
