= 1994 European Parliament election in Germany =

- 12 June 1994

All 99 German seats in the European Parliament
- Turnout: 60.0%
	First party	Second party	Third party
Party	CDU/CSU	SPD	Greens
Alliance	EPP	PES	G
Seats before	32	31	8
Seats won	47	40	12
Seat change	▲15	▲9	▲4
Popular vote	13,739,447	11,389,697	3,563,268
Percentage	38.8%	32,2%	10.1%
Swing	▲1.1%	▼5.1%	▲1.7%

An election of the delegation from Germany to the European Parliament (EP) was held in June 1994.

Due to the accession of the former East German states in 1990, these were the first EU elections in Germany to have East Germans voting. Additionally, the ratification of the 1992 Maastricht Treaty meant that for the first time, European Union citizens resident in Germany could vote on the German members of the European Parliament.

The EP election was part of a "super election year" in Germany, which also saw the 1994 German federal election in October, alongside parliamentary elections in eight of sixteen German states. Treating the EP election as a second-order election, some commentators saw the good result for the reigning Christian Democratic Union (CDU) as a positive indicator of their chances in the subsequent federal elections (which the CDU did indeed win). However, researchers later cast doubt on the notion that the 1994 EP election was a useful "test case" for subsequent national voting patterns.

== Results ==
Party or alliance		Votes	%	Seats	+/–
PES	Social Democratic Party	11,389,697	32.16	40	+9
EPP	Christian Democratic Union	11,346,073	32.04	39	+14
G	Alliance 90/The Greens	3,563,268	10.06	12	+5
EPP	Christian Social Union	2,393,374	6.76	8	+1
EUL	Party of Democratic Socialism	1,670,316	4.72	0	New
ELDR	Free Democratic Party	1,442,857	4.07	0	–4
NI	The Republicans	1,387,070	3.92	0	–6
NI	League of Free Citizens	385,676	1.09	0	New
NI	The Grays – Gray Panthers	275,866	0.78	0	New
NI	Ecological Democratic Party	273,776	0.77	0	0
NI	Car-drivers' and Citizens' Interests Party	231,265	0.65	0	New
NI	Statt Party	168,738	0.48	0	New
NI	Party of the Willing to Work and Socially Vulnerable	127,104	0.36	0	New
NI	Bavaria Party	110,778	0.31	0	0
NI	New Forum	107,615	0.30	0	New
NI	Party of Bible-abiding Christians	93,210	0.26	0	New
NI	Natural Law Party	92,031	0.26	0	New
NI	German Social Union	80,618	0.23	0	New
NI	National Democratic Party	77,227	0.22	0	0
NI	Christian Centre	66,766	0.19	0	0
NI	Christian League	40,115	0.11	0	0
NI	Die Unregierbaren – Autonome Liste	37,672	0.11	0	New
NI	Bürgerrechtsbewegung Solidarität	23,851	0.07	0	New
NI	Platform Europe for Workers and Democracy	12,992	0.04	0	0
NI	Federation of Socialist Workers	10,678	0.03	0	0
NI	Family Party of Germany	2,781	0.01	0	New
Total		35,411,414	100.00	99	+18
Valid votes		35,411,414	97.56		
Invalid/blank votes		884,115	2.44		
Total votes		36,295,529	100.00		
Registered voters/turnout		60,473,927	60.02		
Source: Federal Statistics Office

=== Results by state ===
Results for each party by state.

State	Union	SPD	Grüne	PDS	FDP	Others
Baden-Württemberg	42.0	26.6	13.2	0.5	5.2	12.6
Bavaria	48.9	23.7	8.7	0.4	3.3	14.9
Berlin	28.4	28.1	14.3	15.9	3.2	10.1
Brandenburg (formerly part of East Germany)	23.4	36.9	4.6	22.6	2.7	9.8
Bremen	28.0	40.7	16.0	2.1	4.6	8.6
Hamburg	32.1	34.6	18.4	1.4	3.7	9.7
Hesse	37.0	34.9	12.2	0.8	4.7	10.4
Lower Saxony	39.7	39.6	9.8	0.7	3.9	6.3
Mecklenburg-Vorpommern (formerly part of East Germany)	33.6	22.5	4.8	27.3	2.3	9.5
North Rhine-Westphalia	37.0	40.1	11.2	0.6	4.3	6.8
Rhineland-Palatinate	40.7	38.2	8.7	0.4	4.0	8.0
Saarland	35.6	43.4	8.2	0.4	3.7	8.6
Saxony (formerly part of East Germany)	39.2	21.0	5.6	16.6	3.8	13.7
Saxony-Anhalt (formerly part of East Germany)	30.1	27.9	5.7	18.9	4.7	12.6
Schleswig-Holstein	40.6	35.5	11.9	0.7	3.8	7.5
Thuringia (formerly part of East Germany)	35.8	26.0	6.0	16.9	4.3	11.0
