= Delegation theory =

Concept in organizational theory

Delegation theory in its broadest sense is the process by which an authority shifts some of its responsibilities onto another entity with the view of achieving the best performance in terms of its stated aims and purposes. It is very common for government agencies to delegate authority to private companies with the necessary expertise in the chosen field. More specifically, it is regarded as a tool for strengthening government accountability to private entities such as banks and other large stake holders in the economy. These entities are conceived as independent authorities who take a longer term view of policy decisions, thus negating the pressures that elections put on governments to focus on the short term. In theory this leads to better policy decisions. In practice however this may not always be the case.

== Applications ==
=== Independent central banks and non-majoritarian institutions ===
One of the most important areas where delegation theories have been applied has been in the debate over the merits of Independent Central Banks (ICBs) such as the Bank of England or the European Central Bank. This debate has corresponded to the theories of credible commitments and can be understood as a solution to problems posed by the two democratic pressure problems mentioned above where monetary policy is concerned. Those in favour of the creation of ICBs have primarily focused on interest rates and have argued that democratic pressures tend to have an inflationary effect as governments will often be tempted to advocate lower interest rates immediately prior to an election so as to manufacture short term booms in the economy and boost their support - but to the detriment of long term economic health. A variant of this argument is that as most democracies incorporate two main parties split on economic policy between left and right, the party of the left winning power will often result in damaging inflation raising policies immediately after the election in an effort to distance itself from the previous government. A solution to these problems has naturally been sought in the creation of an independent institution which can decide interest rates outside of the influence of democratic pressures - the ICB.

This argument has been highly influential and the number of ICBs has risen dramatically since the 1980s however it is not without its critics. Many scholars (for instance Kathleen Mcnamara) have questioned the premises of the ICB argument, making the case that democratic pressures will not result in high inflation and that high inflation is not inherently bad for the economy long term. Broadly speaking the empirical evidence on these points has tended to be inconclusive for both sides. An alternative criticism has come from certain branches of new institutionalism who have sought to explain the increase in ICBs not by the 'rational' argument outlined above, but as a process of symbolism, where governments will create ICBs because they are seen to be respectable institutions by other actors, particularly by foreign investors who, it is argued, will view a country with an ICB as a modern state worthy of investment.

=== The European Union ===
Delegation theories have also been applied extensively in studies of the European Union. The dominant approach has undoubtedly been the principal-agent approach, but there have also been variations from the classic form by intergovernmentalist approaches and the fiduciary model laid out by Giandomenico Majone.

Andrew Moravcsik is perhaps the most prominent intergovernmentalist theorist who has written on delegation and his work can essentially be thought of as applying the principal-agent model in a manner which stresses minimal agency loss. The model is not a simple principal-agent model however, as he conceives of the EU as delegation on three levels. Firstly there is the delegation from European electorates to national governments (who in this sense act as agents), secondly there is the delegation from national governments (who now act as principals) to European institutions such as the European Commission. Moravcsik has been particularly interested in the informational asymmetries which arise from delegation in the European Union and has argued that whilst there is minimal agency loss between the national governments and the European institutions, the national governments gain significant informational advantages over European electorates which allow them to carry out policies at home which they would not be able to do in the absence of the European Union. In this sense the delegation process strengthens the national governments rather than weakening them (as is traditionally assumed where the European Union is concerned). This has nevertheless been seen as inconsistent by some scholars (for instance Mark Pollack) who take issue with the assertion that informational advantages only allow national governments to gain freedom from European electorates and that the same principle applies with European institutions gaining an advantage over their principals through informational asymmetries.

In contrast Giandomenico Majone has formulated a theory of delegation which stresses the importance of credibility problems in the decision to delegate to European institutions. Not only is this explained as a mechanism to ensure member states comply with treaty obligations, but employing similar logic as that used in the ICB debates he makes a defence against democratic deficit arguments which advocate a directly elected European Commission. Much in the same way as in the ICB debate democratic pressures are seen as impacting negatively on what is a primarily regulatory institution and as such for Majone the Commission should be insulated from democratic pressures if it is to fulfill its functions effectively.

== Delegation in Spain ==
A delegation (of Latin deputatione) is, in a broad sense, a body of deputies of an assembly (persons to which the assembly delegates its authority) and its respective activities. In Spain, the term is used in a stricter sense in order to designate the administration of some provinces on behalf of the central authority, be it the King or, in modern times, a democratically elected Parliament.

The delegations (in Aragonese deputazions, in Catalan diputacions, in Basque aldundia and in Galician deputación) have territorial character and their function is to manage the economic and administrative interests of the provinces. In the Canary islands the functions of the delegations are exerted by each island's town halls (delegaciones insulares), and in the Balearic islands insular councils (in Catalan consells insulars).

The history of the delegations traces back to 1812 with the enactment of the Constitution of Cadiz, the first democratic Constitution in Spain, having had different roles over the centuries, such as tight control from central government in Francoist Spain.

The members of the delegations are elected in an indirect way, by computing the total result of local elections in each province. However, the members of the town halls and insular councils always have been chosen in direct election, in elections separated from the autonomic or joint with the autonomic elections in the Balearic islands, until the Statute of Autonomy reform in 2007.

The three Basque delegations (and previously also the Delegation of Navarre) are known by the term delegaciones forales, since these four territories still preserve their fueros or medieval privileges. The delegación foral is an executive branch that depends on the General Meetings (the legislative). The General Meetings are the parliaments of each historical territory whose members (junteros or solicitors) are chosen by popular voting, expressed during local elections.

== Sources ==
- Fabrizio Gilardi, "The same, but different. Central banks, regulatory agencies, and the politics of delegation to independent authorities"
- Majone, Giandomenico (2001-02-01). "Two Logics of Delegation: Agency and Fiduciary Relations in EU Governance". European Union Politics. 2 (1): 103–122. doi:10.1177/1465116501002001005. ISSN 1465-1165.
- Kathleen Mcnamara, "Rational Fictions: Central Bank Independence and the Social Logic of Delegation" West European Politics, 25 (1)
- Andrew Moravcsik, "The Choice for Europe"
