= Jean Monnet Programme =

Programme of named European university chairs in European integration

The Jean Monnet Programme, also known as the Jean Monnet Project or Jean Monnet Actions, is a European Union initiative to encourage teaching, research and reflection in the field of European integration studies in higher education institutions. It is named for Jean Monnet, regarded by many as a chief architect of European Unity. It is part of the European Union's education, youth and sports programme Erasmus+. There are additional funds to increase the participation of higher education institutions from countries outside the European Union as part of the EU partnership instrument, which is specifically designed to promote the Union's strategic interests worldwide by reinforcing its external strategies, policies and actions.

== History ==
The initiative was originally launched in 1990. In 2001 it was open to higher education institutions from all around the world. In 2007 it was incorporated into the EU's education programme LLP. In 2014 Jean Monnet became part of the Erasmus+ programme, and additional funds were earmarked to increase the participation of higher education institutions from countries outside the European Union as part of the EU partnership instrument.

== Overview ==
Jean Monnet is dedicated to promoting excellence in EU studies in higher education around the world. Its actions aim to build bridges between academics, researchers and EU policymakers. They focus on the study of and research on EU integration and in understanding Europe's place in a globalised world and are implemented by higher education institutions.

The programme has funded the creation of a network of Jean Monnet European Centres of Excellence, university-level institutions recognised by the European Commission for high quality research into, and teaching of, topics relating to European integration. The commission also funds Jean Monnet Chairs and Jean Monnet teaching modules. It has helped to set up 162 Jean Monnet European Centres of Excellence, 875 Jean Monnet Chairs and 1001 Jean Monnet Teaching Modules worldwide in 72 countries in five continents. These projects bring together 1,500 professors, and reach approximately 500,000 students every year. Jean Monnet Projects are selected on the basis of their academic merits and following a process of rigorous and independent peer review. The projects will be implemented in strict compliance with the principle of academic autonomy and freedom.

== Jean Monnet Chairs ==
Jean Monnet Chairs are teaching posts with a specialisation in European Union studies for university professors or senior lecturers. Jean Monnet Chairs can enhance the teaching of EU studies through the curriculum; conduct, monitor and supervise research on EU matters at all education levels; be a mentor and advisor to the next generation of teachers and researchers; and provide expert guidance to future professionals about European matters. Jean Monnet Chairs are encouraged to publish books within their university press; participate in dissemination and information events in their country and around Europe; organise events (lectures, seminars, workshops, etc.) with policymakers, civil society and schools; network with other academics and institutions supported by Jean Monnet; apply open educational resources, and publish the summaries, content, schedule and expected outcomes of their activities.

Jean Monnet chairs have been established, for example, at the following universities (alphabetically):

- Universität Augsburg (Christoph Vedder3)
- Alexander Dubček University in Trenčin (Uroš Pinterič)
- University of Athens (Giannis Valinakis)
- Birkbeck, University of London (Dionyssis G. Dimitrakopoulos)
- Freie Universität Berlin (Tanja A. Börzel)
- Ruhr-Universität Bochum (Sebastian Bersick)
- Comenius University Bratislava (Ondrej Blažo)
- Universität Bremen (Ulrike Liebert)
- Technische Universität Chemnitz (Matthias Niedobitek)
- Universität Duisburg-Essen (Michael Kaeding und Ansgar Belke)
- Erasmus University Rotterdam (Klaus Heine)
- Europa-Universität Viadrina (Matthias Pechstein)
- Justus-Liebig-Universität Gießen (Mahulena Hofmann)
- Universität Hamburg (Gabriele Clemens)
- Ruprecht-Karls-Universität Heidelberg (Peter-Christian Müller-Graf)
- Royal Holloway, University of London (Giacomo Benedetto)
- Sakarya University
- Universität Hildesheim (Michael Gehler)
- Indiana University (John McCormick)
- Friedrich-Schiller-Universität Jena (Matthias Ruffert)
- Hochschule für Öffentliche Verwaltung Kehl (Annegret Eppler)
- Universität Konstanz (Daniel Thym)
- Deutsche Sporthochschule Köln (Jürgen Mittag)
- Universität zu Köln (Wolfgang Wessels)
- University of Limerick (Joachim Fischer)
- University of Ljubljana (Mojmir Mrak)
- Otto-von-Guericke-Universität Magdeburg (Wolfgang Renzsch)
- Johannes-Gutenberg-Universität Mainz (Arne Niemann)
- Faculty of Organisation Studies in Novo mesto (Uroš Pinterič)%
- Carl-von-Ossietzky-Universität Oldenburg
- Universität Osnabrück (Jean Monnet Centre of Excellence in European Studies)
- Universität Paderborn (Dieter Krimphove)3
- Universität Passau (Daniel Göler)
- Universität Regensburg (Rainer Arnold)
- University of Strasbourg (Frédérique Berrod, Birte Wassenberg, Amélie Barbier-Gauchard, and also French-German Jean Monnet Centre of Excellence in European Studies and Jean Monnet Network Borders in Motion Frontem)
- Eberhard Karls Universität Tübingen (Rudolf Hrbek und Gabriele Abels)
- Universität des Saarlandes (Thomas Giegerich)
- Universität Wuppertal (Hans J. Lietzmann)
- Julius-Maximilians-Universität Würzburg
- York University (Willem Maas and Heather MacRae
- Panthéon-Sorbonne University (Didier Georgakakis)
- Koç University (Bahar Rumelili, Zeynep Ayata)
- University of British Columbia (Kurt Huebner)
- Bilkent University (Gülüm Özçelik, Ioannis N. Grigoriadis)
- Universidade da Beira Interior (Prof. Dr. Bruno Daniel Ferreira da Costa)

== See also ==
- Jean Monnet Foundation for Europe
- Public diplomacy
- Cultural diplomacy
- Fulbright Program
- British Council
- Dante Alighieri Society
- Instituto Cervantes
- German Academic Exchange Service
