= John McCormick (Jean Monnet Chair) =

British-US Political Scientist Professor

- Born: November 30, 1954 (age 71); Ilfracombe, Devon, England, United Kingdom
- Education: Rhodes University; University College London; Indiana University
- Scientific career
- Fields: Political science
- Workplaces: Indiana University Purdue University Indianapolis

John McCormick (born November 30, 1954) is an Emeritus Professor of Political Science and former Jean Monnet Chair of European Union Politics at Indiana University Indianapolis (IUI), and was department chair from 2001 until 2008. He was a Fulbright-Schuman Scholar at the College of Europe in Bruges, Belgium, in 2013. He spent eight years working in the environmental movement (working for the World Wide Fund for Nature and the International Institute for Environment and Development) before becoming an academic. His research and teaching interests include environmental policy, comparative politics, global studies, and the politics and policies of the European Union. He is the author of ten university textbooks that have together gone into nearly 30 editions and been published in a dozen languages.

His 2010 book Europeanism is an attempt to pin down the political, economic and social features of Europe and Europeans. It argues that those who focus on the failures of European integration, the mixed record in the achievement of common European policies, and disagreements among European leaders are missing the bigger picture: that a combination of history and the rise of the European Union have helped encourage Europeans to develop common positions on a wide range of issues. Europeanism today can be equated with reduced identification with the state, secularism, welfarism, cosmopolitanism, communitarianism, multiculturalism, civilian power, and multilateralism. His 2013 book Why Europe Matters makes the case for the European Union, and attempts to address the rising tide of euroscepticism by outlining the achievements of the European Union in promoting peace, democracy, open markets, and a new approach to international relations.

== Publications ==
- International Organizations (Bloomsbury, 2nd edition, 2027).
- Environmental Politics and Policy (Bloomsbury, 2nd edition, 2027).
- European Union Politics (Bloomsbury, 4th edition, 2026).
- Comparative Government and Politics (with Rod Hague and Martin Harrop) (Bloomsbury, 13th edition, 2025).
- Introduction to Global Studies (Bloomsbury, 3rd edition, 2025).
- Understanding the European Union (Bloomsbury, 9th edition, 2025).
- Contemporary Britain (Bloomsbury, 5th edition, 2023).
- Cases in Comparative Government and Politics (Red Globe, 2020).
- The European Union: Politics and Policies (with Jonathan Olsen) (Westview Press, 6th edition, 2017).
- Why Europe Matters: The Case for the European Union (Palgrave Macmillan, 2013).
- Comparative Politics in Transition (Wadsworth/Cengage, 7th edition, 2012).
- Europeanism (Oxford University Press, 2010).
- The European Superpower (Palgrave Macmillan, 2007).
- Environmental Policy in the European Union (Palgrave Macmillan, 2001).
- Acid Earth: The Global Threat of Acid Pollution (Earthscan, 3rd edition, 1997).
- The Global Environmental Movement (John Wiley & Sons, 1995).
- British Politics and the Environment (Earthscan, 1991).
