= Didier Georgakakis =

French political scientist

Didier Georgakakis (born 31 August 1966 in Lyon (Rhône)), is a French political scientist who specializes in the political sociology of the European Union.

He is a professor of Political Science and is the Jean Monnet Chair at the Department of Political Science of the University of Paris I - Panthéon-Sorbonne. He is also a member of the European Centre for Sociology and Political Science (CNRS/P1/EHESS). An honorary member of the Institut Universitaire de France, he has also been a visiting professor at the College of Europe in Bruges since 2007 and was appointed academic coordinator of the European General Studies programme in 2021.
