= Staatenverbund =

Potent union of sovereign states

Staatenverbund (Note: The German term has no equivalent in English though it might partially be translated as "state compound".) is a neologism for a system of multi-level governance in which states work more closely together than in a confederation but, unlike a federal state, retain their own sovereignty. The concept is used in Germany to describe the European Union but has no direct equivalent in other languages. In German jurisprudence, a Staatenverbund is a supranational institution that may exercise sovereign acts (laws, coin money, etc.) but may not independently fix areas where it may exercise this power.

== Origin ==
This concept was first used in 1992 by German jurist Paul Kirchhof, although its initial meaning was not a legal one. The term became established in the jurisprudence of the German Federal Constitutional Court with its 1993 judgement on the Maastricht Treaty.

== Interpretation as a legal term ==
Subsequently, the concept has been taken in law and political science—usually without any real awareness of its original meaning—and was interpreted as the central position between a confederation and a federal form of government.

In the German Constitutional Court ruling on the Lisbon Treaty in June 2009, the concept of Staatenverbund was defined in a more legal framework. Thus, the German Basic Law, article 23 authorizes the Federal Republic of Germany to participate in the building and development of a European Union designed as federation. This concept involves a close and long-term relationship between sovereign states. On the basis of the treaties of the European Union, the Union exercises the authority of government and its basic framework is available only to Member States and their peoples and thus democratic legitimacy can only be done through the citizens of the Member States.

Thus, a Staatenverbund is a supranational institution that may exercise sovereign acts (laws, coin money, etc.) but may not independently fix areas where it may exercise this power. In the EU, this is reflected by the principle of conferral [of powers by member states], according to which the institutions of the European Union may not issue standards unless they are allowed to do so by the EU treaties.

== See also ==
- Subsidiarity
- Supranational union
