= Evidence, Argument, and Persuasion in the Policy Process =

1989 book by Giandomenico Majone

- Author: Giandomenico Majone
- Language: English
- Subjects: Political Science
- Publisher: Yale University Press
- Publication date: 1989
- Pages: 224
- ISBN: 978-0300041590

In Evidence, Argument, and Persuasion in the Policy Process, published in 1989, Italian political scientist Giandomenico Majone contrasts a vision of policy analysis as a technical, nonpartisan, and objective enterprise, with one more dependent upon the political environment in which it is formulated. Against a 'decisionist' view of information-for-decisions, Majone sets policy analysis as distinct from the academic social sciences on the one hand, and from problem-solving methodologies such as operations research on the other (p. 7).

The tasks entrusted to an analyst - according to Majone - are to screen the evidence according to a plurality of viewpoints, elaborate arguments relative to the appropriateness of given policies, elaborate these arguments as a function of the intended audience, and finally present these argument convincingly. For this reason, beyond the necessary technical competence, the analyst should possess rhetorical and dialectical skills.

This book contributes to the efforts to provide a more realistic portrayals of the strengths and limits of analysis, like Richard_R._Nelson’s The Moon and the Ghetto and Aaron Wildavsky’s Speaking Truth to Power: The Art and Craft of Policy Analysis.
