= Democratic legitimacy of the European Union =

The question of whether the governance of the European Union (EU) lacks democratic legitimacy has been debated since the time of the European Economic Community in the late 1970s. This led in part to an elected European Parliament being created in 1979 and given the power to approve or reject EU legislation. Since then, usage of the term has broadened to describe newer issues facing the European Union. Voter turnout at the elections to the European Parliament fell consecutively at every election from the first in 1979 up to 2014 when it hit a low of 42.54%, before finally rising in 2019. The 2014 turnout figure is lower than that of any national election in the 27 countries of the European Union, where turnout at national elections averages 68% across the EU.

Opinions differ as to whether the EU has a democratic deficit or how it should be remedied if it exists. Some scholars argue that the EU does not suffer from a democratic deficit as it is more constrained by its plural structure of checks and balances than any national polity. Moravcsik (2002) argues that the EU has legitimacy through its member states, as their democratically elected governments take part in EU decision-making through the Council of the European Union. He argues that the EU is an intergovernmental institutional framework where democratically elected national governments bargain with each other, and is contained by a structure of checks and balances rather than any polity. In his later work, Moravscik (2008) described the "myth" of Europes democratic deficit, believing that the EU functions as an interstate organisation, which is held accountable member state governments rather than citizens. This makes direct democratic accountability to EU-level electorates less important

Majone argues that the democratic deficit creates inappropriate standards to what is essentially a regulatory body. According to his analysis, non-accountable institutions, such as the European Commission or the Court of Justice, are insulated from democratic contestation to achieve greater efficiency and protect minority rights, similar to independent central banks or regulatory agencies at the national level that are legitimised because of their expertise and effectiveness, rather than direct elections. Pro-Europeans (i.e. those in favour of the EU) argue that the European Union should reform its institutions to make them more accountable, while Eurosceptics argue that the EU should reduce its powers and often campaign for withdrawal from the EU.

== Use and meaning of the term ==
The phrase "democratic deficit" is cited as having first been used in 1977 by the Young European Federalists in their Manifesto, which was drafted by Richard Corbett. In 1979 it was used by David Marquand in reference to the then European Economic Community, the forerunner of the European Union. He argued that the European Parliament (then the Assembly) suffered from a democratic deficit as it was not directly elected by the citizens of the Community. 'Democratic deficit', in relation to the European Union, refers to a perceived lack of accessibility to the ordinary citizen, or lack of representation of the ordinary citizen, and lack of accountability of European Union institutions. Generally, the term 'democratic deficit' describes when there is a gap between the electorate's idea of what a democracy should be, and their perceived conception of how their democracy is currently performing.

Andreas Follesdal and Simon Hix give the clearest critique of EU democratic legitimacy. They give five key issues:

- Increased executive power with decreased national parliamentary control.
- Weak European Parliament despite reforms.
- No genuine European Elections where citizens can choose EU governance.
- Complicated Institutional structure that makes accountability close to impossible.
- Policy drift without an electoral mandate, where technocrats create policy not elected representatives with democratic authority.

Follesdal and Hix argue that together, these problems creates a structural democratic deficit that can't be reformed through evolutionary reforms alone.

=== Constitutional nature of the democratic deficit ===
In the European Union, there are two sources of democratic legitimacy: the European Parliament, chosen by the electorates of the individual EU countries; and the Council of the European Union (the "Council of Ministers"), together with the European Council (of heads of national governments), that represent the peoples of the individual states. The European Commission (the executive branch of the Union) is appointed by the two bodies acting together. Democratic legitimacy within the EU can be compared with the dual legitimacy provided for in a federal polity, such as the United States, where there are two independent sources of democratic legitimacy, the House of Representatives and the Senate, and, to become law, decisions must be approved both by one institution representing the people as a whole and by a separate body representing the peoples of the individual states.

The German Constitutional Court referred to a "structural democratic deficit" inherent in the construction of the European Union. It found that the decision-making processes in the EU remained largely those of an international organisation, which would ordinarily be based on the principle of the equality of states and that the principle of equality of states and the principle of equality of citizens cannot be reconciled in a Staatenverbund. In other words, in a supranational union or confederation (which is not a federal state) there is a problem of how to reconcile the principle of equality among nation states, which applies to international (intergovernmental) organisations, and the principle of equality among citizens, which applies within states. A 2014 report from the British Electoral Reform Society wrote that "[t]his unique institutional structure makes it difficult to apply the usual democratic standards without significant changes of emphasis. Certainly, the principles of representativeness, accountability and democratic engagement are vital, but the protection of the rights of minorities is perhaps especially important. The EU is a political regime that is, in one sense at least, entirely made up of minorities."

== Types of Democratic Legitimacy ==
Academics have created frameworks for explaining the EU's democratic legitimacy beyond electoral measures. Vivien A. Schmitt (2013) argues that there are three areas of legitimacy: Input (participation), output (effectiveness of policy outcomes), and throughput (quality and transparency of governance) legitimacy.

Input legitimacy refers to consent given to the EU through elections and citizen participation. Critics argue that the EU has weak input legitimacy because of low turnout at European Parliament elections and the second-order nature of these elections, where voters choose national concerns over EU concerns to justify their voting behaviour. Output legitimacy is the effective creation of policy that that serves citizen concerns, such as the single market, environmental protection, and Consumer rights. Throughput legitimacy looks at the quality of governance, such as transparency and accountability protections. This means that the EU can, arguably, be legitimate through its strong output and throughput legitimacy, even if input legitimacy is weaker. Granted critics argue that effective policy can't be swapped with genuine democratic participation.

This frame work is important, as it helps explain the core disagreements on the Democratic Legitimacy of the EU.

=== European Commission ===
One assertion of democratic illegitimacy focuses on the role of the European Commission as a non elected institution being the only entity (with some few exceptions) initiating legislation. This criticism has, in turn, been criticized, using comparisons with the situation in national governments where few MP's bills are ever debated and "fewer than 15% are ever successfully adopted in any form", while government proposals "generally pass without substantial or substantive amendments from the legislature". The Commission is reestablished every five years. Individual members of the incoming Commission are nominated by national governments and the proposed Commission is (or is not) approved jointly and severally by the Council of the European Union and the European Parliament. If Parliament passes a vote of censure, the Commission must resign. Such a censure motion has been brought eight times, but never passed. In 1999, an initial censure motion against the Santer Commission was defeated, awaiting the results of an investigation. When the results of the investigation were published, the Santer Commission resigned, forestalling a second censure motion that was expected to pass with a large majority.

In an attempt to strengthen democratic legitimacy, the Treaty of Lisbon provided that the nomination of the President of the European Commission should "take account" of the result of the European parliamentary elections, interpreted by the larger parliamentary groups to mean that the European Council should nominate the candidate (Spitzenkandidat) proposed by the dominant parliamentary group. However, this has also been criticized from the point of view of democratic legitimacy on the grounds that the European Union is not a country and the European Commission is not a government, also having a semi-judicial role that requires it to act as a "referee" or "policeman" rather than a partisan actor. The fear is that a "semi-elected" Commission president might be "too partisan to retain the trust of national leaders; too powerless to win the loyalty of citizens". This, too, is seen as a possibly insoluble problem resulting from the European Union's dual nature, partly an international organization and partly a federation.

The 2019 European Parliament elections showed these tensions when the European Council nominated Ursula von der Leyen for commission president, even if she wasn't in the Spitzenkandidat. This decision can be seen as undermining the Spitzenkandidat and shows that member states have the final control over key appointments regardless of electoral signals, though von der Leyen was ultimately given parliamentary approval.

The Electoral Reform Society observed polling evidence from Germany which showed that support for the CDU/CSU (EPP group) ahead of the 2014 European Parliament elections was higher than support for the Social Democrats (S&D group) and that there was little difference between their support in the opinion polls for national and European Parliament elections. This was despite another poll showing that S&D candidate Martin Schulz was more popular among German voters than EPP candidate Jean-Claude Juncker. They concluded that "this does not suggest that the majority of German voters are treating the contest as a chance to choose a Commission President." However, they recommended that the candidate model be kept with "a clearer set of rules for future elections."

=== European Parliament ===
The main assertion of democratic illegitimacy focuses on the European Parliament lacking the power to determine the direction of EU Law, with the European Commission being "the only institution empowered to initiate legislation" and having a "near monopoly on legislative initiative" according to EU sources. (Note: This is not unusual - in most Parliamentary systems the executive has a "near monopoly on legislative initiative". In Westminster, for example, the only available channel for MPs to initiate legislation is through the Private Members Bill (which is easily defeated through being deprived of time, so is only suitable for minor or uncontroversial bills, though was occasionally used by the government in the 1960s as a mechanism for cross-party legislation. See Private Members' Bills in the Parliament of the United Kingdom).)

Article 225, created in the Lisbon Treaty, sought to put an end to this controversy by giving Parliament a means to request proposals to the Commission, but this puts no obligation on the Commission and is legally non-binding, with the Commission only needing to "inform the European Parliament of the reasons" for rejecting a legislative proposal.

Criticism of this alleged deficit has been countered by a number of political scientists, who have compared the systems of governance in the European Union with that of the United States, and stated that the alleged powerless or dysfunctional nature of the European Parliament is now a "myth". It is argued that there are important differences from national European parliaments, such as the role of committees, bipartisan voting, decentralized political parties, executive-legislative divide and absence of Government-opposition divide. All these traits are considered as signs of weakness or unaccountability, but as these very same traits are found in the US House of Representatives to a lesser or greater degree, the European Parliament is more appropriately compared with the US House of Representatives. In that sense, it is now a powerful parliament, as it is not controlled by a "governing majority": Majorities have to be built afresh for each item of legislation by explanation, persuasion and negotiation.

Legislative initiative in the EU rests almost entirely with the Commission, while in member states it is shared between parliament and executive. However, in national parliaments less than 15% of legislative initiatives from individual members of parliament become law in any form when they do not have the backing of the executive, while most proposals by the executive are passed without major amendments in parliament. The European Parliament, on the other hand, can only propose amendments, but these proposals are successful in more than 80% of cases, and even in controversial proposals, the success rate is almost 30%.

In 2003, Liberal Democrat (ALDE) MEP Chris Davies said he had far more influence as a member of the European Parliament than he did as an opposition MP in the House of Commons. "Here I started to have an impact on day one", "And there has not been a month since when words I tabled did not end up in legislation."

==== European elections ====
The low turnout at European elections has been cited as weakening the democratic legitimacy of the European Parliament: the BBC commented that in Britain many more votes were cast in an election on the reality show Big Brother than in the 1999 European Parliament election. On the other hand, the President of the European Parliament [the 'Speaker'] compared the turnout for the European Parliament to the presidential elections in the United States:

In fact, the figures that are compared, the European Parliament voter turnout from 1999 (49.51%) and the US presidential voter turnout from 1996 (49%) are only marginally different, and the US voter turnout for 1996 was the lowest turnout in the US since 1924 (when it was 48.9%). The turnout in European elections proceeded to decline in every subsequent election up to 2014, when it reached a low of 42.54%. In 2019, over 50 percent of EU citizens voted in the European Parliamentary Elections. This is the first time voter turnout in EU Parliament elections has passed 50% since 1994

Whilst the 50.66% turnout in 2019 saw an increase in the percentage of the electorate voting, it was only an increase of 1.11% since the 1999 election. Turnout was also much lower in individual countries, such as Croatia where only 29.85% of eligible voters went to the ballot box, and 22.74% in Slovenia.

According to Matej Avbelj (Director of the Law Institute in Ljubljana, Slovenia), the EU democratic deficit can be viewed as having a formal component (which is likely to be remedied) but also a social component resulting from people's low acceptance of the EU, as evidenced by low voter turnout.

Legal commentators such as Schmidt and Follesdal argue that the European Union lacks politics that individual citizens understand. This flows from the lack of knowledge of political parties and is reinforced by the lack of votes at European Union elections.

Others such as Pat Cox have opined "Turnout across Europe (1999) was higher than in the last US presidential election, and I don't hear people questioning the legitimacy of the presidency of the United States".

In September 2022 the European Parliament passed a resolution that Hungary turned into "a hybrid regime of electoral autocracy", putting the democratic legitimacy of Elections to the European Parliament in Hungary in question.

=== Second Order Elections and Legitimacy ===
An important challenge to the European Parliament's democratic legitimacy it that the European Parliament tend to be "second order election", where voters choose national rather than European Issues to justify their voting preference. Schmitt (2015) examined the 2004 European Parliament elections. Finding that it was seen as less important than national elections, with voters using European Parliament elections to show their support or dissatisfaction with national governments instead of influencing EU policy. National elections are still seen as the "First Political Arena" for citizens, therefore European Parliament elections have been turned into "protest votes" on national governments. This undermines the claim that the European Parliament has a clear democratic mandate, as the results of elections don't show the citizens preference on European governance.

=== Council of the European Union ===
Voting in the Council (of relevant Ministers) is usually by qualified majority voting, and sometimes unanimity is required. This means that, for the vast majority of EU legislation, the corresponding national government has usually voted in favour in the Council. To give an example, up to September 2006, out of the 86 pieces of legislation adopted in that year the Government of the United Kingdom had voted in favour of the legislation 84 times, abstained from voting twice and never voted against.

==== Presidency ====
The European Parliament has questioned the democratic legitimacy of Hungary holding the rotating presidency of the Council of the European Union in 2023.

== Development of democratic legitimacy and transparency ==
Over time, a number of constitutional changes have been introduced that have aimed to increase democratic legitimacy:

- The Maastricht Treaty introduced
  - the status of EU citizenship, granting EU citizens the right to vote and stand in elections to the European Parliament and municipal elections in their country of residence, irrespective of their nationality (subject to age and residency qualifications).
  - the legislative procedure known as the "co-decision procedure", giving the directly elected European Parliament the right of "co-deciding" legislation on an equal footing with the Council of the European Union.
- The Treaty of Lisbon, which came into force on 1 December 2009 introduced
  - article 10, confirming that the functioning of the EU shall be founded on representative democracy and giving EU citizens both direct representation through the European Parliament and indirect representation via national governments through the Council of the European Union
  - the establishment of the co-decision procedure as the standard ("ordinary") legislative procedure
  - a significant increase in the powers of the European Parliament where henceforth it would have control over a greater number of policy areas, full parity with the council in approving the annual budget, and the role of electing the president of the commission by majority vote.
  - the right of any EU citizen or resident to petition the European Parliament "on any matter which comes within the Union's field of activity and which affects him, her, or it directly".[Article 227 TFEU].
  - making meetings of the Council public when there is a general debate and when a proposal for a legislative act is voted on. These debates can be viewed in real time on the Internet.
  - enhancing the role of national parliaments in EU legislation.
  - giving full legal effect to the Charter of Fundamental Rights of the European Union, which was solemnly proclaimed by the European Parliament, the Council of the European Union and the European Commission in the year 2000.

According to a 2019 study, the empowerment of the EP does not always lead to more public support, and "further enhancement of public support can be achieved only in the institutional dimension involving proposal power".

== Political philosophy of the European Union ==
The European Union describes its values as being 'Human Dignity, Freedom, Democracy, Equality, Rule of Law, and Human Rights'. Democracy is a cornerstone of the project that is the European Union, and has been since its inception. It thus also represents a criterion for accession to the EU. In its decision to reject Turkey's petition to join the Union, the claim that the nation is 'eroding democracy' was a contributing factor. Democracy, however, is interpreted and applied differently across the EU. The Economist Intelligence Unit's Democracy Index indicates variance in the strength of democracy amongst EU states - these discrepancies have provided reason for the European Parliament itself to question the democratic legitimacy of the EU.

== See also ==
- Rule of Law Conditionality Regulation (Internal sanction on EU member state)
- Apportionment in the European Parliament
- Referendums related to the European Union
- Euroscepticism
