= Transition economy =

Economy changing from a centrally planned to a market economy

A transition economy or transitional economy is an economy which is changing from a centrally planned economy to a market economy. Transition economies undergo a set of structural transformations intended to develop market-based institutions. These include economic liberalization, where prices are set by market forces rather than by a central planning organization. In addition to this, trade barriers are removed, there is a push to privatize state-owned enterprises and resources, state and collectively run enterprises are restructured as businesses, and a financial sector is created to facilitate macroeconomic stabilization and the movement of private capital. The process has been applied in China, the former Soviet Union and Eastern bloc countries of Europe and some Third world countries, and detailed work has been undertaken on its economic and social effects.

The transition process is usually characterized by the changing and creating of institutions, particularly private enterprises; changes in the role of the state, thereby, the creation of fundamentally different governmental institutions and the promotion of private-owned enterprises, markets and independent financial institutions. In essence, one transition mode is the functional restructuring of state institutions from being a provider of growth to an enabler, with the private sector its engine. Another transition mode is change the way that economy grows and practice mode. The relationships between these two transition modes are micro and macro, partial and whole. The truly transition economics should include both the micro transition and macro transition. Due to the different initial conditions during the emerging process of the transition from planned economics to market economics, countries uses different transition model. Countries like the People's Republic of China and Vietnam adopted a gradual transition mode, however Russia and some other East-European countries, such as the former Socialist Republic of Yugoslavia, used a more aggressive and quicker paced model of transition.

The term "transition period" is also used to describe the process of transition from capitalism to the first stage of socialism, preceding the establishment of fully developed socialism (aka communism).

== Transition indicators ==
The existence of private property rights may be the most basic element of a market economy, and therefore implementation of these rights is the key indicator of the transition process.

The main ingredients of the transition process are:

- Liberalization – the process of allowing most prices to be determined in free markets and lowering trade barriers that had shut off contact with the price structure of the world's market economies.
- Macroeconomic stabilization – bringing inflation under control and lowering it over time, after the initial burst of high inflation that follows from liberalization and the release of pent-up demand. This process requires discipline over the government budget and the growth of money and credit (that is, discipline in fiscal and monetary policy) and progress toward sustainable balance of payments.
- Restructuring and privatization – creating a viable financial sector and reforming the enterprises in these economies to render them capable of producing goods that could be sold in free markets and transferring their ownership into private hands.
- Legal and institutional reforms – redefining the role of the state in these economies, establishing the rule of law, and introducing appropriate competition policies.

According to Oleh Havrylyshyn and Thomas Wolf of the International Monetary Fund, transition in a broad sense implies:

- liberalizing economic activity, prices, and market operations, along with reallocating resources to their most efficient use;
- developing indirect, market-oriented instruments for macroeconomic stabilization;
- achieving effective enterprise management and economic efficiency, usually through privatization;
- imposing hard budget constraints, which provide incentives to improve efficiency; and
- establishing an institutional and legal framework to secure property rights, the rule of law, and transparent market-entry regulations.

Edgar Feige, cognizant of the trade-off between efficiency and equity, suggests that the social and political costs of transition adjustments can be reduced by adopting privatization methods that are egalitarian in nature, thereby providing a social safety net to cushion the disruptive effects of the transition process.

The European Bank for Reconstruction and Development (EBRD) developed a set of indicators to measure the progress in transition. The classification system was originally created in the EBRD's 1994 Transition Report, but has been refined and amended in subsequent Reports. The EBRD's overall transition indicators are:

- Large-scale privatization
- Small-scale privatization
- Governance and enterprise restructuring
- Price liberalization
- Trade and foreign exchange system
- Competition policy
- Banking reform and interest rate liberalization
- Securities markets and non-bank financial institutions
- Infrastructure reform

== Context ==
The economic malaise affecting the Comecon countries – low growth rates and diminishing returns on investment – led many domestic and Western economists to advocate market-based solutions and a sequenced programme of economic reform. It was recognized that micro-economic reform and macro-economic stabilization had to be combined carefully. Price liberalization without prior remedial measures to eliminate macro-economic imbalances, including an escalating fiscal deficit, a growing money supply due to a high level of borrowing by state-owned enterprises, and the accumulated savings of households ("monetary overhang") could result in macro-economic destabilization instead of micro-economic efficiency. Unless entrepreneurs enjoyed secure property rights and farmers owned their farms the process of Schumpeterian "creative destruction" would limit the reallocation of resources and prevent profitable enterprises from expanding to absorb the workers displaced from the liquidation of non-viable enterprises. A hardening of the budget constraints at state-owned enterprises would halt the drain on the state budget from subsidization but would require additional expenditure to counteract the resulting unemployment and drop in aggregate household spending. Monetary overhang meant that price liberalization might convert "repressed inflation" into open inflation, increase the price level still further and generate a price spiral. The transition to a market economy would require state intervention alongside market liberalization, privatization and deregulation. Rationing of essential consumer goods, trade quotas and tariffs and an active monetary policy to ensure that there was sufficient liquidity to maintain commerce might be needed. In addition to tariff protection, measures to control capital flight were also considered necessary in some instances.

== Transition in practice ==
The most influential strategy for the transition to a market economy was that adopted by Poland launched in January 1990. The strategy was strongly influenced by IMF and World Bank analyses of successful and unsuccessful stabilization programmes which had been adopted in Latin America in the 1980s. The strategy incorporated a number of interdependent measures including macro-economic stabilization; the liberalization of wholesale and retail prices; the removal of constraints to the development of private enterprises and the privatization of state-owned enterprises; the elimination of subsidies and the imposition of hard budget constraints; and the creation of an export-oriented economy that was open to foreign trade and investment. The creation of a social safety net targeted at the individual to compensate for the removal of job security and the removal of price controls on staple goods was also part of the strategy.

The choice of the transition strategy was influenced by the critical state of most post-socialist countries. Policy-makers were persuaded that political credibility took precedence over a sequenced reform plan and to introduce macro-economic stabilization measures ahead of structural measures that would by their nature take longer to implement. The "credibility" of the transition process was enhanced by the adoption of the Washington Consensus favoured by the IMF and the World Bank. Stabilization was deemed a necessity in Hungary and Poland where state budget deficits had grown and foreign debts had become larger than the country's capacity to service. Western advisers and domestic experts working with the national governments and the IMF introduced stabilization programmes aiming to achieve external and internal balance, which became known as shock therapy. It was argued that "one cannot jump over a chasm in two leaps".

The many foreign advisers from, principally, the United States, the United Kingdom and Sweden were often under contract to the international financial institutions and bilateral or multilateral technical assistance programmes. They favoured free trade and exchange rate convertibility rather than trade protection and capital controls, which might have checked capital flight. They tended to support privatization without prior industrial restructuring; an exception was to be found in Eastern Germany where the Treuhand (Trust Agency) prepared state-owned enterprises for the market at considerable cost to the government. Western technical assistance programmes were established by European Union – through the Phare and TACIS programmes – and other donors (including the US AID, the UK Know-how Fund and UNDP) and by the IMF, the World Bank, EBRD and KfW, which also advanced loans for stabilization, structural adjustment, industrial restructuring and social protection. Technical assistance was delivered through the exchange of civil servants and by management consultants, including Agriconsulting, Atos, COWI, Ernst & Young, GOPA, GTZ, Human Dynamics, Idom, IMC Consulting, Louis Berger, NIRAS, PA Consulting, PE International, Pohl Consulting, PwC, and SOFRECO.

It had been expected that the introduction of current account convertibility and foreign trade liberalization would force a currency devaluation that would support export-led growth. However, when prices were de-controlled enterprises and retailers raised their prices to match those prevailing in the black market or towards world price levels, earning them windfall profits initially. Consumers reacted by reducing their purchases and by substituting better quality imported goods in place of domestically produced goods. Falling sales led to the collapse of many domestic enterprises, with personnel lay-offs or reduced hours of work and pay. This further reduced effective demand. As imports grew and exporters failed to respond to opportunities in world markets due to the poor quality of their products and lack of resources for investment, the trade deficit expanded, putting downward pressure on the exchange rate. Many wholesalers and retailers marked prices according to their dollar values and the falling exchange rate fed inflation. The central banks in several countries raised interest rates and tightened credit conditions, depriving state agencies and enterprises of working capital. These in turn found it impossible to pay wages on time, dampening effective demand further.

The impacts of the conventional transition strategies proved to be de-stabilizing in the short-term and left the population impoverished in the long-term. Economic output declined much more than expected. The decline in output lasted until 1992-96 for all transition economies. By 1994, economic output had declined across all transition economies by 41 percent compared to its 1989 level. The Central and Eastern European economies began growing again around 1993, with Poland, which had begun its transition programme earliest emerging from recession in 1992. The Baltic States came out of recession in 1994 and the rest of the former Soviet Union around 1996. Inflation remained above 20 percent a year (except in the Czech Republic and Hungary) until the mid-1990s. Across all transition economies the peak annual inflation rate was 2632 percent (4645 percent in the CIS). Unemployment increased and wages fell in real terms, although in Russia and other CIS economies the rate of unemployment recorded at employment exchanges remained low. Labour force surveys undertaken by the International Labour Organization showed significantly higher rates of joblessness and there was considerable internal migration. High interest rates induced a "credit crunch" and fuelled inter-enterprise indebtedness and hampered the expansion of small and medium-sized enterprises, which often lacked the connections to obtain finance legitimately.

In time domestic producers were able to upgrade their production capacity and foreign direct investment was attracted to the transition economies. Local-manufactured higher quality consumer goods became available and won market share back from imports. Stabilization of the exchange rate was made more difficult by large-scale capital flight, with domestic agents sending part of their earning abroad to destinations where they believed their capital was more secure. The promise of European Union membership and the adoption of the EU's legislation and regulations (the Community acquis or acquis communautaire) helped secure trust in property rights and economic and governmental institutions in much of Central and Eastern Europe.

Some economists have argued that the growth performance of the transition economies stemmed from the low level of development, decades of trade isolation and distortions in the socialist planned economies. They have emphasized that the transition strategies adopted reflected the need to resolve the economic crisis besetting the socialist planned economies and the overriding objective was the transformation to capitalist market economies rather than the fostering of economic growth and welfare.

But by 2000, the EBRD was reporting that the effects of the initial starting point in each transition economy on the reform process had faded. Although the foundations had been laid for a functioning market economy through sustained liberalization, comprehensive privatization, openness to international trade and investment, and the establishment of democratic political systems there remained institutional challenges. Liberalized markets were not necessarily competitive and political freedom had not prevented powerful private interests from exercising undue influence.

Ten years on, in the Transition Report for 2010, the EBRD was still finding that the quality of market-enabling institutions continued to fall short of what was necessary for well-functioning market economies. Growth in the transition economies had been driven by trade integration into the world economy with "impressive" export performance, and by "rapid capital inflows and a credit boom". But such growth had proved volatile and the EBRD considered that governments in the transition economies should foster the development of domestic capital markets and improve the business environment, including financial institutions, real estate markets and the energy, transport and communications infrastructure. The EBRD expressed concerns about regulatory independence and enforcement, price setting, and the market power of incumbent infrastructure operators.

Income inequality as measured by the Gini coefficient rose significantly in the transition economies between 1987 and 1988 and the mid-1990s. Poverty re-emerged with between 20 and 50 percent of people living below the national poverty line in the transition economies. The UN Development Programme calculated that overall poverty in Eastern Europe and the CIS increased from 4 percent of the population in 1988 to 32 percent by 1994, or from 14 million people to 119 million. Unemployment and rates of economic inactivity were still high in the late 1990s according to survey data.

By 2007, before the 2008 financial crisis, the index for GDP had reached 112 compared to 100 in 1989 for the transition economies. In other words, it took nearly 20 years to restore the level of output that had existed prior to the transition. The index of economic output (GDP) in the countries of Central and Eastern Europe was 151 in 2007; for the Balkans/ South-eastern Europe the index was 111, and for the Commonwealth of Independent States and Mongolia it was 102. Several CIS countries in the Caucasus and Central Asia as well as Moldova and Ukraine had economies that were substantially smaller than in 1989.

The Great Recession and the Euro area crisis destabilized the transition economies, reduced growth rates and increased unemployment. The slowdown hit government revenues and widened fiscal deficits but almost all transition economies had experienced a partial recovery and had maintained low and stable inflation since 2012.

== Process ==
Transition trajectories have varied considerably in practice. Some nations have been experimenting with market reform for several decades, while others are relatively recent adopters (e.g., North Macedonia, Serbia, Montenegro), and Albania. In some cases reforms have been accompanied with political upheaval, such as the overthrow of a dictator (Romania), the collapse of a government (the Soviet Union), a declaration of independence (Croatia), or integration with another country (East Germany). In other cases economic reforms have been adopted by incumbent governments with little interest in political change (China, Laos, Vietnam). Transition trajectories also differ in terms of the extent of central planning being relinquished (e.g., high centralized coordination among the CIS states) as well as the scope of liberalization efforts being undertaken (e.g., relatively limited in Romania). Some countries, such as Vietnam, have experienced macro-economic upheavals over different periods of transition, even transition turmoil.

According to the World Bank's 10 Years of Transition report "... the wide dispersion in the productivity of labour and capital across types of enterprises at the onset of transition and the erosion of those differences between old and new sectors during the reform provide a natural definition of the end of transition." Mr. Vito Tanzi, Director of the IMF's Fiscal Affairs Department, gave definition that the transformation to a market economy is not complete until functioning fiscal institutions and reasonable and affordable expenditure programs, including basic social safety nets for the unemployed, the sick, and the elderly, are in place. Mr Tanzi stated that these spending programs must be financed from public revenues generated—through taxation—without imposing excessive burdens on the private sector.

According to the EBRD a well-functioning market economy should enjoy a diverse range of economic activities, equality of opportunity and convergence of incomes. These outcomes had not yet been achieved by 2013 and progress in establishing well-functioning market economies had stalled since the 1990s. On the EBRD's measure of transition indicators the transition economies had become "stuck in transition". Price liberalization, small-scale privatization and the opening-up of trade and foreign exchange markets were mostly complete by the end of the 1990s. However economic reform had slowed in areas such governance, enterprise restructuring and competition policy, which remained substantially below the standard of other developed market economies.

According to Stuart Shields, liberalization of the ECE economies took place notably through various changes which were supported by the EBRD, for instance, set in different different steps. Firstly, measures of competition and financial discipline were put in place in the beginning. As part of the second wave of reforms, changes were focused on the opening of key parts of the economy to foreign competition in order to improve human capital and to foster entrepreneurship in those economies. Thus, they turned to labour market transformation by highlighting the need for a more flexible labour market. Furthermore, new institutional frameworks were needed, to help with transformations such as privatisation and the increasing flows of Foreign direct investment as part of what is described as “an institutional shock therapy”.

Inequality of opportunity was higher in the transition economies of Central and Eastern Europe and Central Asia than in some other developed economies in Western Europe (except France, where inequality of opportunity was relatively high). The highest inequality of opportunity was found in the Balkans and Central Asia. In terms of legal regulations and access to education and health services, inequality of opportunity related to gender was low in Europe and Central Asia but medium to high in respect of labour practices, employment and entrepreneurship and in access to finance. In Central Asia women also experienced significant lack of access to health services, as was the case in Arab countries. While many transition economies performed well with respect to primary and secondary education, and matched that available in many other developed economies, they were weaker when it came to training and tertiary education.

Over the decade 1994 to 2004, the transition economies had closed some of the gap in income per person with the average for the European Union in purchasing power parity terms. These gains had been driven by sustained growth in productivity as obsolete capital stock was scrapped and production shifted to take advantage of the opening-up of foreign trade, price liberalization and foreign direct investment. However the rapid growth rates of that period of catch-up had stalled since the late 2000s and the prospects for income convergence have receded according to the EBRD's prognosis, unless there are additional productivity-enhancing structural reforms.

The recent history of transition suggested that weak political institutions and entrenched interest groups had hindered economic reform. The EBRD's Transition Report 2013 looked at the relationship between transition and democratization. The report acknowledged that the academic literature was divided on whether economic development fostered democracy but argued that there was nonetheless strong empirical support for the hypothesis. It suggested that countries with high inequality were less inclined to support a limited and accountable state. In general, the proportion of the population with an income of between US$10–50 a day (the so-called "middle class") correlated with the level of democracy; however this correlation disappeared in transition countries with high income inequality. Those countries with large natural resource endowments, for example oil and gas producers like Russia and Kazakhstan, had less accountable governments and faced less electoral pressure to tackle powerful vested interests because the government could rely on resource rents and did not have to tax the population heavily. Countries with a strong institutional environment – that is, effective rule of law, secure property rights and uncorrupted public administration and corporate governance – were better placed to attract investment and undertake restructuring and regulatory change.

To spur further economic reform and break out of a vicious circle, the EBRD Transition Report 2013 proposed that the transition economies should:

- Open up trade and finance, which made reform more resilient to popular pressure ("market aversion") and meant that countries could access the EU single market either as member states or through association agreements (such as those being negotiated with Ukraine, Moldova and Georgia);
- Encourage transparent and accountable government, with media and civil society scrutiny, and political competition at elections;
- Invest in human capital, especially by improving the quality of tertiary education.

== Countries in transition ==
Although the term "transition economies" usually covers the countries of Central and Eastern Europe and the former Soviet Union, this term may have a wider context. Outside of Europe, there are countries emerging from a socialist-type command economy towards a market-based economy (e.g., China). Despite such movements, some countries have chosen to remain non-free states with regard to political freedoms and human rights.

In a wider sense, the definition of transition economy refers to all countries which attempt to change their basic constitutional elements towards market-style fundamentals. Their origin could be also in a post-colonial situation, in a heavily regulated Asian-style economy, in a Latin American post-dictatorship, or even in a somehow economically underdeveloped country in Africa.

In 2000, the IMF listed the following countries with transition economies:

Europe IMF (2000), World Bank (2002, 2009)
In transition	Transition complete (2019)
Albania; Armenia; Belarus; Bosnia and Herzegovina^{1}; Georgia; Kosovo^{1}; Moldova; Montenegro^{1}; North Macedonia; Russia; Serbia^{1}; Ukraine	Bulgaria; Croatia; Czech Republic; Estonia; Hungary; Latvia; Lithuania; Poland; Romania; Slovak Republic; Slovenia

^{1} — World Bank assessment

Other countries (IMF, 2000)
In transition
Central and Southeast Asia
- Kazakhstan
- Kyrgyz Republic
- Tajikistan
- Turkmenistan
- Uzbekistan
- Cambodia
- China
- Laos
- Vietnam
Africa
- Botswana

In addition, in 2002, the World Bank defined Bosnia and Herzegovina, and the Federal Republic of Yugoslavia (later Serbia and Montenegro) as transition economies. In 2009, the World Bank included Kosovo in the list of transition economies. Some World Bank studies also include Mongolia. According to the IMF, Iran is in transition to a market economy, demonstrating early stages of a transition economy.

The eight first-wave accession countries, which joined the European Union on 1 May 2004 (the Czech Republic, Estonia, Hungary, Latvia, Lithuania, Poland, Slovakia, Slovenia) and the two second-wave accession countries that joined on 1 January 2007 (Romania and Bulgaria), have completed the transition process. According to the World Bank, "the transition is over" for the 10 countries that joined the EU in 2004 and 2007. It can be also understood as all countries of the Eastern Bloc.

According to the United Nations Department of Economic and Social Affairs' World Economic Situation and Prospects report, the following 17 countries are classified as "economies in transition" as of January 2024:

- Albania
- Armenia
- Azerbaijan
- Belarus
- Bosnia and Herzegovina
- Georgia
- Kazakhstan
- Kyrgyzstan
- Moldova
- Montenegro
- North Macedonia
- Russia
- Serbia
- Tajikistan
- Turkmenistan
- Ukraine
- Uzbekistan

== Branch of economics ==
Transition economics is a special branch of economics dealing with the transformation of a planned economy to a market economy. It has become especially important after the collapse of Communism in Central and Eastern Europe. Transition economics investigates how an economy should reform itself to endorse capitalism and democracy. There are usually two sides: one which argues for a rapid transformation and one which argues for a gradual approach. Gérard Roland's book Transition and Economics. Politics, Markets and Firms (MIT Press 2000) gives a good overview of the field. A more recent overview is provided in Transition Economies: Political Economy in Russia, Eastern Europe, and Central Asia by Martin Myant and Jan Drahokoupil.

== Comparative tables ==
=== Two extremes: Romania and Kyrgyzstan ===
At the beginning of the 1990s, Communist leaders remained in power in Romania and - with the exception of Kyrgyzstan - in Central Asia. These two countries were both exceptions within their respective regions: Romania was the only one of the 6 former non-Soviet Warsaw Pact countries to opt for gradual instead of radical reform, while Kyrgyzstan was the only Central Asian country and the only one in the CIS other than Russia to implement radical reform. According to the EBRD's Structural Reform Index, a country can be defined as a "full-fledged market economy" once it crosses the threshold of 0.70, which Kyrgyzstan accomplished in 1994 (the first CIS country to do so) and Romania in 1998 (and Russia, for reference, in 1996).

**1998**	Reform type	GDP ($ billions)	Real GDP index (1989=100)	Population under $2.15/day	External debt (% of GDP)	Private sector share (% of GDP)	Cumulative FDI inflows (1989 to 1998; $ millions)
**Kyrgyzstan**	radical	1.6	60	49.1%	89.5	60	332
**Romania**	gradual	38	76	6.8%	24.0	60	4,510

=== Real wages during the 1990s ===
**Real wage** **(1989=100.0)**	1990	1991	1992	1993	1994	1995	1996	1997	1998	1999
Armenia	107.7	72.3	39.6	6.3	16.8	20.0	29.0	26.2	31.9	35.1
Bulgaria	111.5	68.0	76.7	77.6	63.7	60.2	49.6	40.1	47.0	52.2
Czech Republic	96.3	68.9	76.0	78.8	84.9	92.2	100.4	102.3	101.0	107.1
Estonia	102.5	68.2	45.2	46.3	50.9	54.0	55.2	59.5	63.5	66.2
Hungary	94.3	87.7	86.5	83.1	89.1	78.2	74.3	77.1	79.6	81.0
Latvia	105.0	71.9	49.0	51.8	57.9	57.7	54.1	60.7	63.0	65.0
Lithuania	108.8	75.3	46.6	28.4	32.5	33.5	34.8	39.5	44.6	47.8
Moldova	113.7	105.2	64.4	41.8	33.8	34.3	36.3	38.2	40.4	35.1
North Macedonia	79.2	67.9	41.6	56.5	51.2	48.6	48.8	49.4	50.9	53.0
Poland	75.6	75.4	73.3	71.2	71.6	73.7	77.9	82.4	85.2	95.8
Romania	105.2	88.9	77.3	64.4	64.6	72.7	79.8	62.3	61.1	62.3
Russia	109.1	102.4	68.9	69.1	63.7	45.9	52.0	54.5	47.2	38.2
Slovakia	94.2	67.3	76.6	69.2	71.4	75.3	81.9	87.4	88.8	86.1
Slovenia	73.8	61.8	61.3	70.4	75.4	79.4	83.1	85.4	86.7	89.4
Ukraine	109.3	114.2	123.7	63.2	56.4	62.2	59.3	57.7	55.7	48.4

=== 1990s lowest GDP ===
During the 1990s, the GDP of the transition economies declined sharply relative to its 1989 level. However, this decline varied considerably from country to country: for some, GDP bottomed out at or over 75% of its 1989 level, while for others, it plummeted to below a third. The worst among the 15 post-Soviet countries was represented by Georgia in the year 1994, with 25.4% of its 1989 GDP. The lowest decline was represented by the Czech Republic, with 84.6% of its 1989 GDP in the year 1992. Uzbekistan had the highest GDP bottom among the post-Soviet countries, with 83.4% of its 1989 level in the year 1995. Albania experienced the worst decline among the non-Soviet countries of the defunct Warsaw Pact, its GDP amounting to only 60.4% of its 1989 level in 1992. The absolute worst was to be found in the former Yugoslavia - war-torn Bosnia and Herzegovina's GDP declined to only 12% of its 1989 level. All the transition countries for which such data is available are listed below (countries in bold bottomed out at a higher level than the U.S. during the Great Depression, when 1933 American GDP was 73.4% of its 1929 level):

Country	1990s lowest GDP (1989 = 100)
**Czech Republic**	**84.6**
**Uzbekistan**	**83.4**
**Poland**	**82.2**
**Slovenia**	**82.0**
**Hungary**	**81.9**
**Romania**; **Slovakia**	**75.0**
(East Germany) Eastern Germany	68.0
Bulgaria	63.2
Belarus	62.7
Kazakhstan	61.2
Estonia	60.8
Albania	60.4
Croatia	59.5
Russia	55.3
North Macedonia	55.1
Lithuania	53.3
Latvia	51.0
Kyrgyzstan	50.4
Turkmenistan	42.0
Serbia and Montenegro	40.0
Tajikistan	39.2
Azerbaijan	37.0
Ukraine	36.5
Moldova	31.7
Armenia	31.0
Georgia	25.4
Bosnia and Herzegovina	12.0

=== Debt defaults ===
Country	Years in default
Albania	1991 - 1995
Bosnia and Herzegovina	1992 - 1997
Bulgaria	1990 - 1994
Croatia	1992 - 1996
Moldova	1998; 2002
Mongolia	1997 - 2000
North Macedonia	1992 - 1997
Russia	1991 - 1997; 1998 - 2000
Serbia and Montenegro	1992 - 2004
Slovenia	1992 - 1996
Ukraine	1998 - 2000

=== The EU candidate countries plus Russia (1998) ===
Between 16 December 1991 and 10 June 1996, a total of 10 transition countries signed Europe Association Agreements (EAs), these agreements acknowledging their ultimate objective of joining the EU. The ten countries were subsequently divided. The five states deemed to have made the most progress (Poland, Hungary, the Czech Republic, Slovenia and Estonia) - constituting the Luxembourg Group - were invited in July 1997 to begin accession negotiations (these began in March 1998). The remaining five countries (Romania, Slovakia, Bulgaria, Latvia and Lithuania) - constituting the Helsinki Group - joined the Luxembourg Group in December 1999.

1998	GDP ($ billions) (Note: 1998 GDP per capita multiplied by 1998 population)	Real GDP index (1989=100) (Note: the average between the EIU estimate (used by the OECD) and the UNECE estimate (used by the Council of Europe))	External debt (% of GDP)	Private sector share (% of GDP)	Cumulative FDI inflows (1989 to 1998; $ millions)	Freedom House's Nations in Transit cumulative score (8 to 56; greater number = more authoritarian)	Asset share of state-owned banks (%)
Luxembourg Group
Poland	158.5	117.2	37.3	65	15,066	13	48
Czech Republic	60.8	95.45	40.0	75	9,997	14	18.8
Hungary	46.9	95.3	58.0	80	16,459	13	11.8
Slovenia	21.1	102.25	34.7	60	1,192	16	41.3
Estonia	5.65	79.95	52.5	70	1,382	16	7.8
Helsinki Group
Romania	42.1	78.1	23.6	60	4,510	33	74.6
Slovakia	22.2	99.8	53.7	75	1,762	29	50
Bulgaria	12.7	67.3	80.6	65	1,323	30	59.5
Lithuania	11	65.6	34.2	70	1,534	18	45.3
Latvia	6.6	59.4	46.8	65	1,604	18	8.5
Russia
Russia	263.8	55.8	70.4	70	8,901	32	42.2

=== Industrial indicators ===
Deindustrialization
Following the collapse of Communism, the transition economies underwent various degrees of deindustrialization. Deindustrialization varied widely across the region, both in terms of when the fall in output bottomed out and how steep the decline in output was. The extremes were represented by Uzbekistan, where industrial output bottomed out in 1992 at 96.4% of its 1989 level, and Bosnia, where industrial output fell to 1.7% of its 1989 level in 1994. Such data is available for 27 countries, plus the territory of the former German Democratic Republic:

Lowest yearly industrial output during the 1990s higher than 1980 output
Lowest yearly industrial output during the 1990s higher than half of 1980 output
Lowest yearly industrial output during the 1990s lower than half of 1980 output

Country	Lowest industrial output as % of 1989 (year)
Uzbekistan	96.4 (1992)
Poland	69.7 (1991)
Hungary	66.8 (1992)
Czech Republic; Slovakia; Slovenia	66.1 (1993)
Turkmenistan	63.1 (1997)
Belarus	62.7 (1995)
Croatia	49.6 (1994)
Ukraine	49.1 (1998)
Kazakhstan	47.7 (1995)
Estonia	47.1 (1994)
Russia	46.0 (1998)
North Macedonia	42.9 (1995)
Romania	41.4 (1999)
Bulgaria	40.7 (1999)
Armenia	39.5 (1993)
Latvia	38.7 (1995)
Serbia and Montenegro	35.2 (1999)
(East Germany) Eastern Germany	34.7 (1992)
Moldova	32.7 (1999)
Tajikistan	32.7 (1997)
Lithuania	31.7 (1994)
Kyrgyzstan	26.7 (1995)
Azerbaijan	26.3 (1996)
Albania	18.1 (1996)
Georgia	13.2 (1995)
Bosnia and Herzegovina	1.7 (1994)

Trade openness and competitive industrial performance (CIP) in 1998

Country	Trade openness rank (out of 109)	CIP rank (out of 87)
Estonia	3rd	N/A
Czech Republic	10th	24th
Lithuania	19th	N/A
Slovakia	39th	N/A
Latvia; Bulgaria	43rd	N/A
Hungary	51st	27th
Poland	67th	34th
Slovenia	68th	28th
Ukraine	68th	N/A
Russia	89th	44th
Romania	97th	41st
Albania	100th	68th
Croatia	101st	N/A

== See also ==
- Democracy and economic growth
- Demographic transition
- Energy transition
- Soviet-type economy
- Planned economy
- Mixed economy
- Marketization
- Privatization
- Corporatization
- Real socialism
