= Simon Hix =

British political scientist

Simon Hix FBA
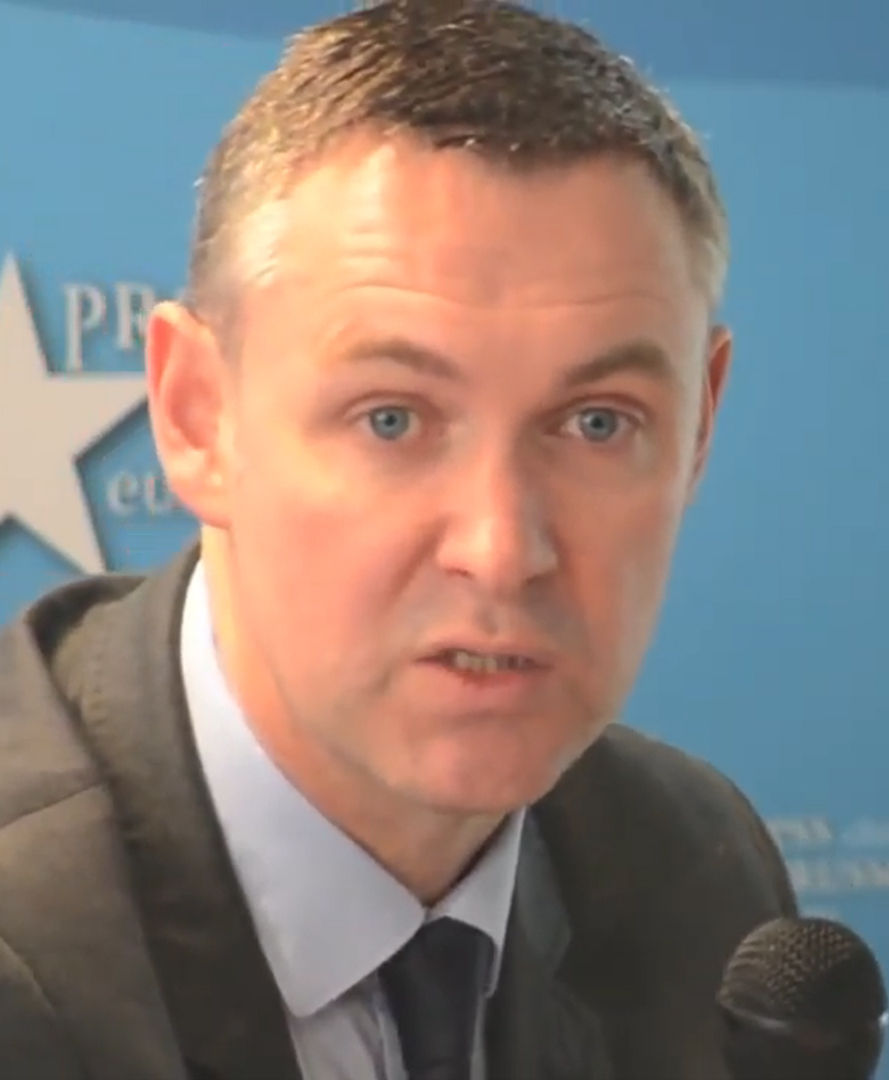
- Hix in 2014
- Born: 5 September 1968 (age 58)
- Occupation: Professor
- Board member of: Associate editor of European Union Politics; Chairman of VoteWatch Europe
- Awards: Fellow of the British Academy; Doctor Honoris Causa

Academic background
- Education: London School of Economics; European University Institute
- Thesis: Political parties in the European Union system : a 'comparative politics approach' to the development of the party federations (1995)
- Doctoral advisor: Giandomenico Majone

Academic work
- Discipline: Political Science
- Institutions: European University Institute; London School of Economics and Political Science
- Doctoral students: Giacomo Benedetto; Sara Hagemann
- Notable students: Claudiu Crăciun; Cristian Ghinea
- Website: simonhix.com

Simon Hix is a British political scientist, holder of the Stein Rokkan chair in comparative politics at the European University Institute in Florence. His main areas of research are voting in parliaments, democratic institutions, and EU politics.

Hix is an expert in European Union politics, and the author of several books, including What's Wrong with the European Union and How to Fix It, Democratic Politics in the European Parliament with Abdul Noury and Gérard Roland, and The Political System of the European Union. He is also associate editor of the international peer-reviewed journal European Union Politics, and founder and chairman of VoteWatch Europe, an influential online EU affairs think-tank founded in London in 2009 that combines big data with political insight.

After a first degree and a master's from the London School of Economics and Political Science, Hix obtained a PhD in Political and Social Science at the European University Institute in Florence in 1995, and lectured in European Politics at Brunel University 1996–97, before joining the LSE in 1997. In this university he was promoted to professor in 2004, and served also as head of its department of government (2012–2015), academic director of its school of public policy (2017–2019), and pro-director for research from 2019. He was also Harold Laski Professor of Political Science and pro-director for research at the London School of Economics and Political Science. He finally was appointed Stein Rokkan chair of comparative politics at the European University Institute in Florence in 2021.

== Distinctions ==
Simon Hix was elected a Fellow of the British Academy in 2011. In 2015 he was named the inaugural Harold Laski Chair at the London School of Economics and Political Science. Later that year he was awarded a degree of Doctor Honoris Causa by the National School of Political and Administrative Studies in Bucharest. In 2021 he was appointed Stein Rokkan Chair in comparative politics at the European University Institute.

== Publications ==
- Political Parties in the European Union (1997), with Christopher Lord, London: Macmillan.
- The Political System of the European Union (1999), London: Palgrave.
- Götz, Klaus H.; Hix, Simon, eds. (2001). Europeanised Politics? : European Integration and National Political Systems. Frank Cass. ISBN 9780714651415. OCLC 237440109.
- Hix, Simon; Raunio, Tapio; Scully, Roger (2003). "Fifty Years on: Research on the European Parliament". JCMS: Journal of Common Market Studies. Blackwell Science Ltd. 41 (2): 191–202. doi:10.1111/1468-5965.00418. ISSN 0021-9886 – via John Wiley & Sons, Ltd.
- Hix, Simon; Høyland, Bjørn (2005). The Political System of the European Union. The European Union Series (2nd ed.). Palgrave Macmillan. ISBN 9780230802315. OCLC 870195167.
- Hix, Simon; Noury, Abdul G.; Gérard, Roland (2007). Democratic Politics in the European Parliament. Cambridge University Press. ISBN 9780521694605. OCLC 442372456.
- Hix, Simon (2013) [First published in 2008]. What's Wrong with the European Union and How to Fix It. John Wiley & Sons. ISBN 9780745658377. OCLC 899161144.
- Hix, Simon; Høyland, Bjørn (2011). The Political System of the European Union. The European Union Series (3rd ed.). Palgrave Macmillan. ISBN 9780230249813. OCLC 803832782.
