= Sara Hagemann =

Danish academic

- Occupations: Academic Director LSE School of Public Policy and Associate Professor in European Politics

Academic background
- Education: London School of Economics and Political Science
- Thesis: Decision-making in the European Union's Council of Ministers (2007)
- Doctoral advisor: Simon Hix

Academic work
- Discipline: Political science, European studies
- Institutions: London School of Economics and Political Science
- Website: www.lse.ac.uk/european-institute/People/Academic-Staff/Hagemann-Sara

Sara Hagemann is a Danish academic and an expert on international and European politics. She has published extensively on issues related to political processes and representation in the European Union, transparency in politics, and the role of national parliaments in international affairs. Sara is currently Professor of Political Science and Vice Dean at the Faculty of Social Sciences, Copenhagen University, where she joined in September 2021. Before then she was associate professor at the London School of Economics and Associate Dean at the LSE School of Public Policy and a faculty member of the LSE European Institute. Sara has also held positions as head of programme and policy analyst at the European Policy Centre's Political Europe Programme and the Centre for European Policy Studies in Brussels, senior fellow at the UK in a Changing Europe, and worked in the Danish Ministry for Foreign Affairs.

== Early life and education ==
Hagemann was born in 1979 in Aarhus, Denmark, to former Secretary General of the Nordic Council Henrik Hagemann and school teacher Jytte Fisker. She undertook her postgraduate studies at the Department of Government of the London School of Economics where she was awarded her PhD in 2007 with a thesis entitled 'Decision-Making in the European Union's Council of Ministers’ under the supervision of Simon Hix.

== Works ==
- Hagemann, Sara; Hobolt, Sara; Wratil, Christopher (2017). "Government Responsiveness in the European Union: Evidence from Council Voting". Comparative Political Studies. 50 (6): 850–876. doi:10.1177/0010414015621077. S2CID 155707465.
- Hagemann, Sara; Franchino, Fabio (2016). "Transparency vs Efficiency? A Study of Negotiations in the Council of the European Union". European Union Politics. 17 (3): 408–428. doi:10.1177/1465116515627017. S2CID 155391383.
- de Clerck-Sachsse, Claire; Hagermann, Sara (2007). Old Rules, New Game: Decision-Making in the Council of Ministers After the 2004 Enlargement. Brussels: Centre for European Policy Studies. ISBN 9789290796992. OCLC 847426213.
- Hagemann, Sara (2012). Money and Power: EU Budget Negotiations in a Time of Austerity. Copenhagen: DIIS. OCLC 821574475.
