= Die Unregierbaren – Autonome Liste =

The Ungovernable - Autonomous List Die Unregierbaren – Autonome Liste
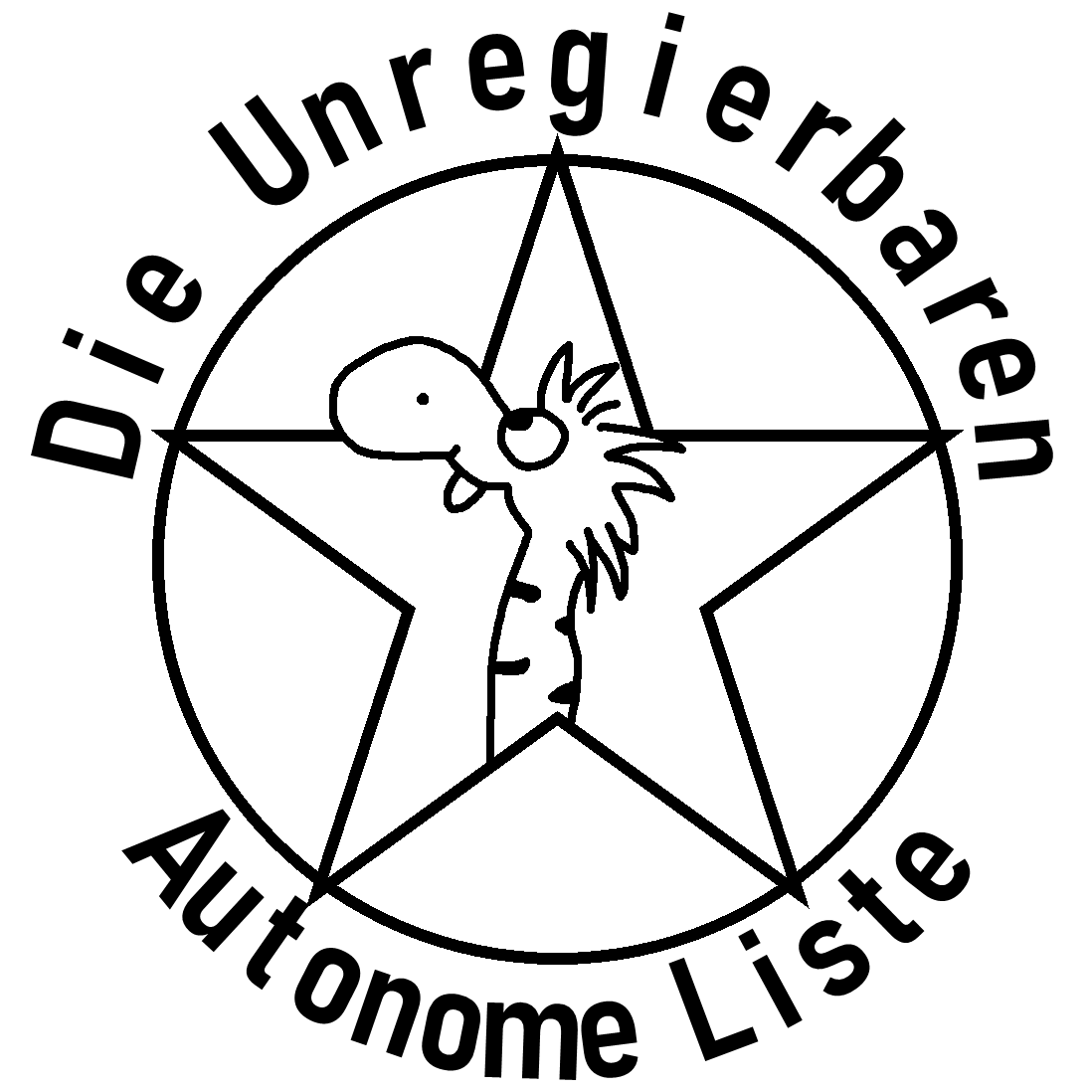
- Abbreviation: U/AL
- Founded: August 1993
- Dissolved: 2000
- Headquarters: Wuppertal
- Ideology: Anti-fascism; Direct action

The Ungovernable - Autonomous List (German: Die Unregierbaren – Autonome Liste) short-form: Autonome or Unregierbaren, Abbreviation: U/AL, was a minor political party in Germany that most prominently participated in the 1994 European elections where it was able to achieve 37,672 votes (0.11%). The party worked together with multiple Antifa groups and the minor party ÖkoLinX in its campaigning, it was also endorsed by the German musician Bela B. The goal of the party was reportedly to use electoralism and campaigning as a means of "Autonomous agitation" and the party did not intend to win any seats.

== Election results ==
It first participated under the name Liste für ein Autonomes Zentrum (List for an Autonomous Center) in the 1989 municipal elections in Wuppertal. After the U/AL was officially founded as a political party, it partook in the 1994 district election in Elberfeld, where it received 110 votes (0.1%).

The party most prominently participated in the 1994 European elections where it achieved a surprisingly high result of 37,672 votes (0.11%) federally and even higher percentage results in some constituencies, the highest of which being Wuppertal where the party received 0.4% of the vote.

== See also ==
- Election boycott
- Antifa (Germany)
- Anarchism in Germany
- 1994 European Parliament election in Germany
