= Gérard Roland (economist) =

Belgian economist

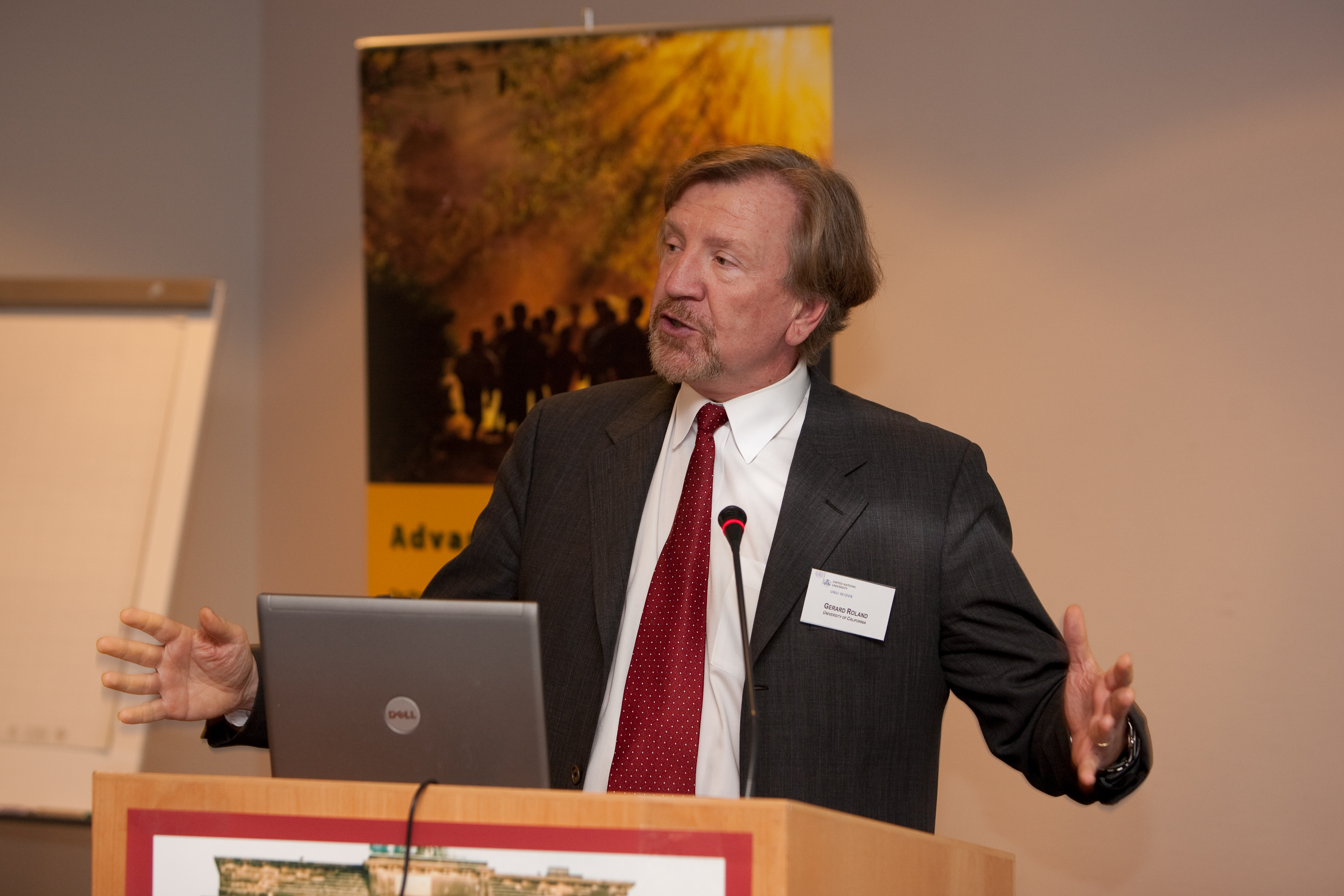
- Roland in 2009
- Born: 1954 (age 71–72); Jemappes, Wallonia, Belgium

Academic background
- Education: Free University of Brussels

Academic work
- Discipline: Economics; Political science
- Institutions: University of California, Berkeley
- Website: Information at IDEAS / RePEc

Gérard Roland (born 1954) is a Belgian economist, and a professor of economics and political science at the University of California, Berkeley since 2001. He graduated from the Free University of Brussels in 1988 where he taught from 1991 to 2001.

His early work was on the political economy of communism. After 1990, he became one of the world's most renowned and influential scholars in transition economics. He published various articles in the top 5 economics journals. He wrote the leading graduate textbook Transition and Economics published in 2000 at MIT Press and translated in various languages, including Chinese and Russian. In 1999, he co-organized, with Olivier Blanchard, a Nobel Symposium on transition economics in Stockholm.”

At UC Berkeley, he expanded his research to development economics, institutional economics, and the economics of culture. In recent years, he has focused on comparative economic history, investigating the historical origins of contemporary cultural differences.

He has received many honors, including an honorary professorship from Renmin University of China in Beijing in 2002 and the medal De Scientia et Humanitate Optime Meritis by the Czech Academy of Sciences on November 15, 2018.

In 2024, he was awarded the Czech Economic Society’s Prize for Long-Term Contribution to the Development of Czech Economic Learning.

The Association for Comparative Economic Studies created an annual dissertation fellowship in his name to recognize his contributions to the field. He was a long-time member of the Executive and Supervisory Committee (ESC) of CERGE-EI.

In 2025, he received from the Society for Institutional and Organizational Economics (SIOE) at its Sidney Conference the "Elinor Ostrom Lifetime Achievement Award".

He has contributed to numerous reports and academic studies on the European Union and has co-authored multiple scholarly articles, as well as a book on the European Parliament, with Simon Hix (European University Institute) and Abdul Noury (New York University Abu Dhabi).

== Selected works ==
=== Articles ===
- “The Design of Reform Packages under Uncertainty” (with M. Dewatripont), American Economic Review, 1995, 83(5): 107–1223.
- “Federalism and the Soft Budget Constraint” (with Y. Qian), American Economic Review, 1998, 88(5): 1143–1162.
- “Separation of Powers and Political Accountability” (with T. Persson and G. Tabellini), Quarterly Journal of Economics, 1997, 112(4): 1163–1202.
- “Understanding the Soft Budget Constraint” (with J. Kornai and E. Maskin), Journal of Economic Literature, 2003, 41(4): 1095–1136.
- “The Breakup of Nations: A Political Economy Analysis” (with P. Bolton), Quarterly Journal of Economics, 1997, 112(4): 1057–1090.
- “Comparative Politics and Public Finance” (with T. Persson and G. Tabellini), Journal of Political Economy, 2000, 108: 1121–1141.
- “Reform without Losers: An Interpretation of China’s Dual-Track Approach to Transition” (with Y. Qian and L. Lau), Journal of Political Economy, 2000, 108(1): 120–143.
- “Understanding Institutional Change: Fast-Moving and Slow-Moving Institutions,” Studies in Comparative International Development, 2003, 38: 109–131.
- “Coordination and Experimentation in M-form and U-form Organizations” (with Y. Qian and C. Xu), Journal of Political Economy, 2007, 114(2): 366–402.
- “Culture, Institutions, and the Wealth of Nations” (with Y. Gorodnichenko), Review of Economics and Statistics, 2017, 99(3): 402–416.

=== Books ===
- Transition and Economics: Politics, Markets, and Firms. MIT Press, 2000.
- Democratic Politics in the European Parliament (with S. Hix and Abdul Noury). Cambridge University Press, 2007.
- Development Economics. Pearson, 2013.
- Empires, Nation-States, and Democracies: Institutions in the International Arena. Princeton University Press, 2026 (forthcoming).
