= Strategic delegation =

Strategic delegation refers to delegation of decision-making to agents, and accompanying organizational design choices, which, under strategic interdependence, serve as commitments that influence interactions with rivals and potentially lead to beneficial outcomes for the delegating party.

The general theoretical model of strategic delegation suggests that principals (e.g., owners, shareholders) may gain from delegating decisions to agents (e.g., managers) whose motivations and incentives differ from those of their principals. That is because delegation to such agents may constitute a commitment that influences competitive interactions with actual and potential rivals. How these competitive interactions unfold, however, depends on the competitive context. Thus, strategic delegation perspective links four constructs: delegation decisions, strategic behavior, competitive interactions with rivals, and performance.

== Background ==
The intellectual roots of strategic delegation go back to Thomas Schelling, who discussed in his influential 1960 book The Strategy of Conflict the use of delegates as a way to credibly commit a negotiating party to a position in a bargaining situation: “The use of thugs and sadists for the collection of extortion or the guarding of prisoners, or the conspicuous delegation of authority to a military commander of known motivation, exemplifies a common means of making credible a response pattern that the original source of decision might have been thought to shrink from or to find profitless, once the threat had failed. (Just as it would be rational for a rational player to destroy his own rationality in certain game situations, either to deter a threat that might be made against him and that would be premised on his rationality or to make credible a threat that he could not otherwise commit himself to, it may also be rational for a player to select irrational partners or agents.)” (pp. 142–143)

Later work on game theory established that an ability to commit to a clear path of action can be valuable when bargaining among a small number of players. The value of commitment arises in these situations because by “binding oneself” a party can credibly commit to a pattern of competitive actions or reactions, and therefore affect the expectations and actions of other parties and the resulting competitive dynamics. Strategic delegation models flourished in the game-theoretical industrial organization economics literature following the seminal contributions of Vickers (1985), Fershtman and Judd (1987), and Sklivas (1987) formalizing this idea of commitment through delegation to agents.

== Mechanisms ==
There are a number of strategic choices that might be used to commit agents to certain courses of action, including:

- Selection of agents with known predispositions
- Organizational structure, in particular allocation of decision rights, divisionalization and vertical separation
- Provision of incentives
- Financial structure

Even though most of the literature examines these choices in isolation, simultaneous use of multiple mechanisms is possible both in theory and in practice.

== See also ==
- Delegation
- Organizational design
- Strategic move
