= European Union Politics =

- Discipline: Political science
- Language: English
- Edited by: Gerald Schneider

Publication details
- History: 2000-present
- Publisher: SAGE Publications
- Frequency: Quarterly
- Impact factor: 2.438 (2019)

Standard abbreviations
- ISO 4: Eur. Union Politics

Indexing
- ISSN: 1465-1165 (print); 1741-2757 (web)
- LCCN: 00234202
- OCLC no.: 43598989

Links
- Journal homepage; Online access; Online archive

European Union Politics (EUP) is a peer-reviewed academic journal for research and scholarship on the processes of government, politics and policy in the European Union. The journal was established in 2000. Its founding editor, Gerald Schneider (University of Konstanz, Germany), continues to serve as the Executive Editor. EUP is published on a quarterly basis in March, June, September and December by SAGE Publications.

== Abstracting and indexing ==
European Union Politics is abstracted and indexed in Current Abstracts, Current Contents, International Bibliography of the Social Sciences, and the Social Sciences Citation Index. According to the Journal Citation Reports, the journal has a 2018 impact factor of 2.600, ranking it 30th out of 176 journals in the category "Political Science".

== Scope ==
EUP's aim is to stimulate debate and provide a forum to bridge theoretical and empirical analysis on the political unification of Europe. While the journal represents no particular school or approach, it has served as an outlet for applications of rational choice theory. It also frequently contains articles on decision making in European institutions such as the Council of Ministers or the European Parliament and analyses of public attitudes towards the EU. The journal has published special issues on such topics as euro-skepticism, constitution-building, and the impact of the EU on ideological competition.

== Data replication ==
EUP requires all authors to make their data publicly available once their article is accepted for publication. The data replication policy of the journal - in common with that of many journals in the sciences - aims to render the research process more transparent and cumulative.

== See also ==
- List of political science journals
