= Faculty of Organisation Studies in Novo Mesto =

University in Slovenia

Coordinates: 45°48′22.9″N 15°9′54.0″E

Fakulteta za organizacijske študije v Novem mestu
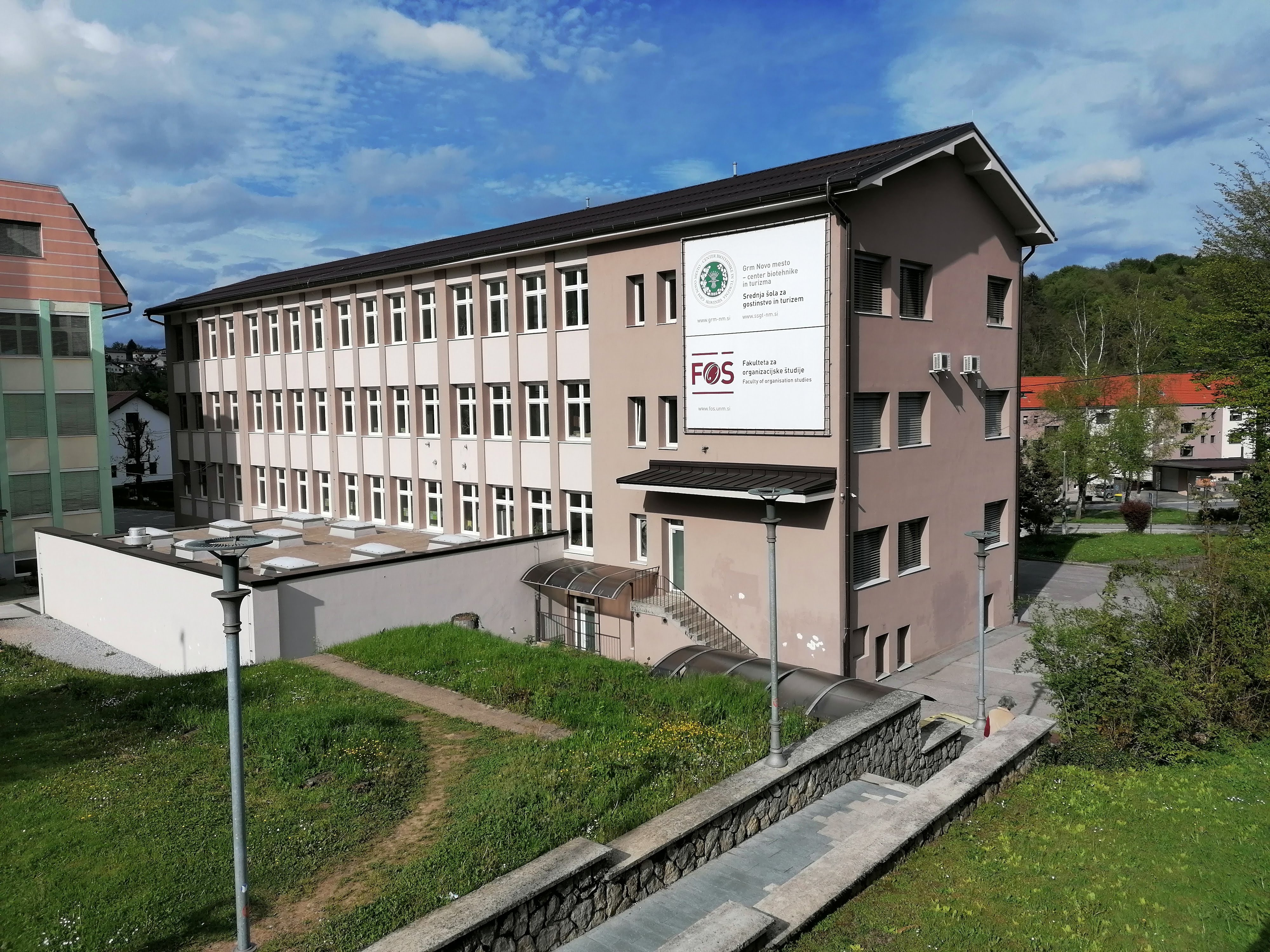
- Established: 2008
- Dean: Boris Bukovec
- Location: Novo mesto, Slovenija
- Website: www.fos-unm.si

The Faculty of Organisation Studies in Novo Mesto (FOS; Slovene: Fakulteta za organizacijske študije v Novem mestu) is an independent higher education institute, in Novo Mesto, Slovenia. The Faculty of Organisation Studies in Novo Mesto holds ISO standards ISO 9001 and ISO/IEC 27001. In 2015, the Faculty was recognised by the Information Commissioner of the Republic of Slovenia for its efforts in the field of personal data protection.

The current dean is Dr. Annmarie Gorenc Zoran.

== Development and activities ==
The Faculty of Organisation Studies in Novo mesto (FOŠ) is a private higher education institution founded by the Institute for Management Excellence (IOM) and the Municipality of Novo Mesto.

The faculty was founded in 2008 and, in the academic year 2010/2011, the second degree programme (MAG) Quality Management and the third degree programme (DR) Quality Management were introduced. The first degree programme (VS) Quality Management was launched in the academic year 2011/2012, in accordance with the strategic plan of the Faculty of Education.

The Faculty is located at Ulica Talcev 3, Novo Mesto.

The Faculty offers 3 study programmes called Quality Management. The study programme is conducted as a mixture of contact courses (physically at the Faculty's location) and distance learning (e-classrooms), which enables students to adapt and coordinate their studies more easily with their work, family and other commitments. Students are offered information support and the opportunity to purchase O365 licences. In its 15 years of existence, the faculty has produced over 260 first, second and third degree graduates.

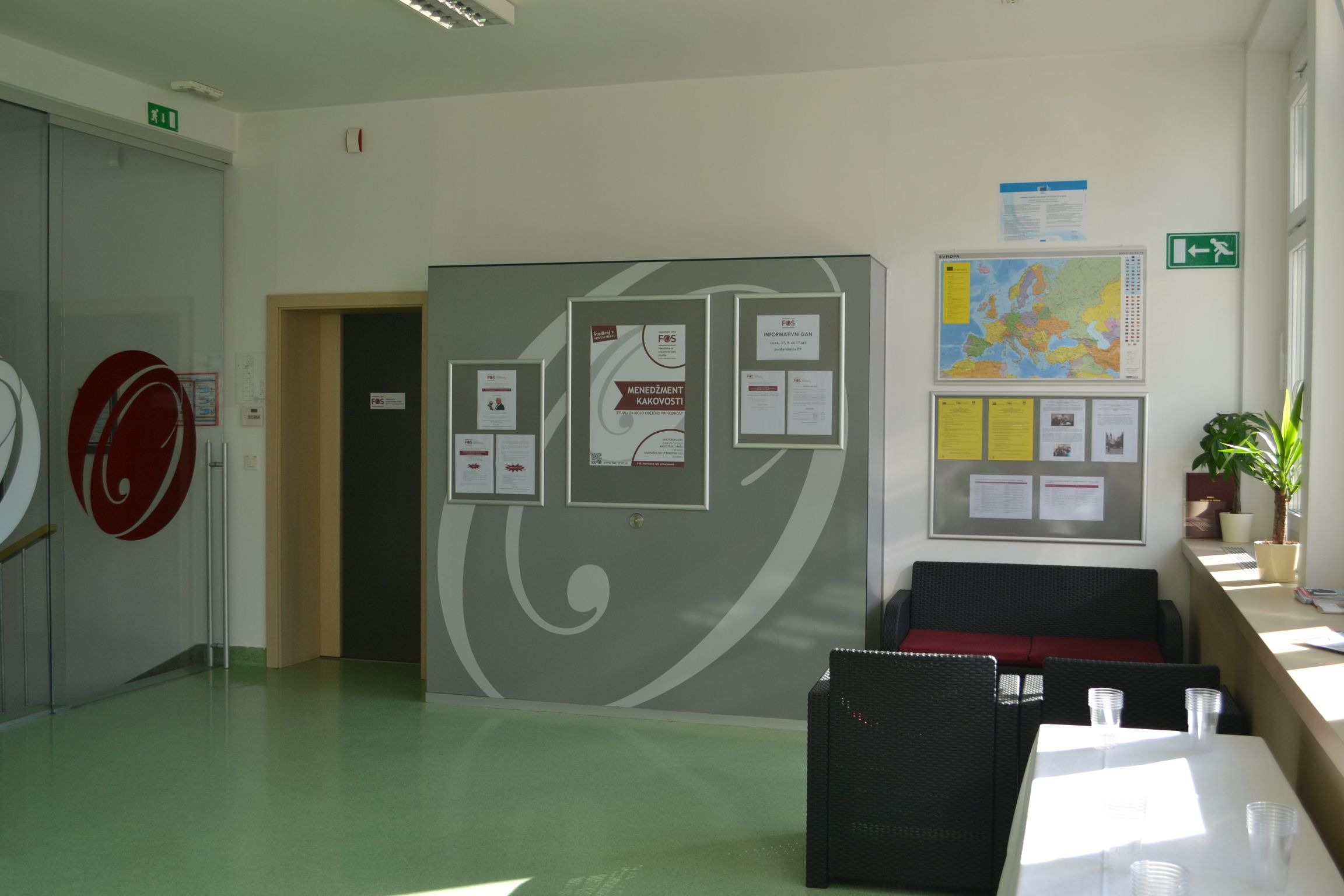
Faculty of Organisation Studies centre

== Study programmes ==
The Faculty of Organisation Studies in Novo Mesto offers study programmes at bachelor's, master's and doctoral levels in the field of quality management. Study programmes are accredited by the Slovenian national higher school accreditation agency.

The first-level (BA) quality management course lasts three years (six semesters) and leads to the professional title of diplomirani organizator (VS).

The second-level postgraduate programme (Master) in Quality Management lasts two years and is divided into four semesters, after which the graduate is awarded the professional title of Magister menedžmenta kakovosti.

The postgraduate programme (Ph.D.) in Quality Management lasts three years and is divided into six semesters, upon completion of which the Ph.D. student is awarded the academic title Doktor znanosti (Doctor of Science).

== International collaboration ==
Among other forms of cooperation with foreign institutions of higher education, the Faculty of Organisation Studies in Novo Mesto participates in the Erasmus+ programme of students and staff exchange.

== Research, international activities, scientific conferences and publications ==
The Institute of Organisational Studies (IOS), which is part of FOS, has set itself the goal of promoting excellent research activities and has established individual centres for this purpose:

- Centre of Excellence
- ITRC LEAD Centre
- Centre for the Study of Contemporary Social Challenges
- Centre for Development and European Studies
- Centre for Innovative Tourism.

FOS thus offers knowledge in the field of higher education teaching, research, counselling and education, covering the following areas:

- Assessment of Business Excellence - EFQM & TQM model
- Quality assurance
- Quality in education
- Pedagogical-dragogical skills
- Open and distance learning, e-learning, AI tools
- HRM processes, well-being, communication, emotional intelligence, coaching
- Social research, anthropological organisational research, research, measurement, analysis
- Management skills, models, business practises, organisational behaviour
- Professional orientation
- European research topics
- It also offers training on topics such as intercultural communication, business coaching, AI tools in education, leadership, business excellence, ISO certifications, change management and conflict resolution.

International cooperation is very important to FOŠ, for the development of knowledge, exchange of ideas, promotion of cultural diversity, internationalisation of organisations, and scientific research and innovation. One of the most important benefits of international cooperation at the Faculty is the possibility of student and staff mobility through the Erasmus+ programme and the implementation of various international research and educational projects.

Since 2015, the faculty has organised the New Paradigm of Organisational Theories academic conference every year in collaboration with other higher education institutions. At the conference, they offer young doctors of science, doctoral students and university teachers and researchers a place to present already recognised and emerging contributions to science.

Since 2012, the Faculty has been publishing the scientific journal Journal of Universal Excellence and, since 2016, the journal Challenges to the Future. The journal is indexed in databases DOAJ, EBSCO, ASCI-Database, COBISS, dLib, Google scholar, ICI World of journals, MIAR, WorldCat (OCLC), QOAM

The faculty also publishes monographs by Slovenian and international authors.

The Faculty of Organisation Studies in Novo Mesto is also a member of the RENET network (Researchers' Excellence network).
