= Journal of Public Policy =

- Discipline: policy analysis
- Language: English
- Edited by: Anthony Bertelli, Peter John, Valentina Mele

Publication details
- History: 1981–present
- Publisher: Cambridge University Press
- Frequency: quarterly

Standard abbreviations
- ISO 4: J. Public Policy

Indexing
- ISSN: 0143-814X (print); 1469-7815 (web)

Links
- Journal homepage

The Journal of Public Policy is a quarterly peer-reviewed academic journal with a focus on public policy.
