= Second-order election =

Second-order election is a term that appeared for the first time in Karlheinz Reif and Hermann Schmitt's "Nine second-order national elections – A conceptual framework for the analysis of European election results" article for the [European Journal of Political Research, in 1980]. It was used to analyze the first European Parliament elections, held in 1979 in the, then, nine member states of the European Economic Community. Reif and Schmitt argued that second-order elections were viewed by voters and political parties as less important than national elections, leading to a lack of turnout or focus on these elections. According to the "second-order elections" approach, European Parliament elections were "second-order" in that they were viewed as less important by voters, parties and the media than first-order elections.

First-order elections are those that determine the government and/or executive power in a political system, i.e., national elections. They are first-order in that they are seen as more important by parties, voters and the media. Local and regional elections are also considered second-order elections.

Second-order elections present the following characteristics: turnout is expected to be lower than in national elections, voters are more prone to vote for protest parties, or parties in the periphery of the political system, rather than the usual mainstream parties they would vote for in a national election. As a result, second-order elections are often used by voters to punish or reward the current governing parties.

One of the key features of second-order elections is the high level of Protest votes, where votes typically choose smaller or single issue parties, rather than mainstream ones. These votes are typically used as a way for voters to show dissatisfaction with current governments. This occurs due to voters feeling freer to vote for parties that align with their personal views as second-class elections have less importance on who wins so less Strategic voting occurs.

Regarding EP elections, empirical evidence has shown that all EP elections thus far (1979, 1985, 1989, 1994, 1999, 2004, 2009, 2014, 2019) have been second-order elections. This is due to their lack of voter turnout compared to national elections. However, the second-order elections approach has not been confirmed for the twelve new member states of the European Union (Bulgaria, Czech Republic, Cyprus, Estonia, Hungary, Latvia, Lithuania, Malta, Poland, Romania, Slovakia, Slovenia).

Other examples of second-order elections include Midterm Elections in the America and Local and Regional Elections.

Despite being low stake, second-order elections can still have implications for national politics. They can act as a measure of public opinion, reveal political trends, show any shifts in voting or dissatisfaction and giving great insight into public opinion.
