= Heinke Salisch =

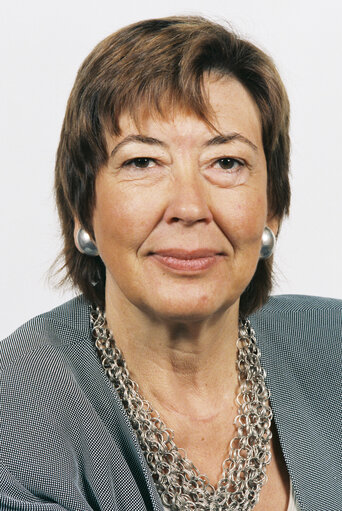
- Heinke Salisch as a MEP

Member of the European Parliament for Germany
- In office 1979–1996

Personal details
- Born: 14 August 1941 (age 85) Grevenbroich, Germany
- Party: Social Democratic Party

Heinke Salisch (born 14 August 1941) is a German politician from the Social Democratic Party of Germany (SPD). She was a long-serving member of the European Parliament and previously worked as an interpreter.

== Life ==
After graduating from high school, Salisch studied applied linguistics in Mainz and graduated with a degree in interpreting in 1965. She then worked as a freelance conference interpreter until 1979. Heinke Salisch is widowed and has two sons.

== Political career ==
As early as 1971, Salisch became a city councillor in Karlsruhe, a body she served on until 1988. In the first European direct elections in 1979, Salisch was elected to the European Parliament and re-elected in 1984 and 1989. She was a member of the European Parliament until 1996. From 1995 to 2003, she was mayor of Karlsruhe and headed the building department.

== Literature ==
- Ina Hochreuther: Frauen im Parlament. Südwestdeutsche Abgeordnete seit 1919. Im Auftrag des Landtags herausgegeben von der Landeszentrale für politische Bildung. Theiss-Verlag, Stuttgart 1992, ISBN 3-8062-1012-8, S. 231–232.
