= Alliance 90/The Greens =

Green political party in Germany

Alliance 90/The Greens Bündnis 90/Die Grünen
- Co-leaders: Felix Banaszak; Franziska Brantner
- Parliamentary leaders: Katharina Dröge; Britta Haßelmann
- Founded: 13 January 1980 (The Greens); 21 September 1991 (Alliance 90); 14 May 1993 (merger)
- Merger of: The Greens; Green Party; Alliance 90
- Headquarters: Platz vor dem Neuen Tor 1; 10115 Berlin
- Think tank: Heinrich Böll Foundation
- Youth wing: Green Youth
- LGBTQ wing: Queergrün
- Membership (February 2025): ▲166,000
- Ideology: Green politics Social liberalism
- Political position: Centre-left
- European affiliation: European Green Party
- European Parliament group: Greens/EFA
- International affiliation: Global Greens
- Colours: Green
- Bundestag: 85 / 630
- Bundesrat: 11 / 69
- State Parliaments: 277 / 1,870
- European Parliament: 12 / 96
- Heads of State Governments: 1 / 16

Party flag

Website
- gruene.de

Alliance 90/The Greens (German: Bündnis 90/Die Grünen [ˈbʏntnɪs ˈnɔʏntsɪç diː ˈɡʁyːnən]), often simply referred to as the Greens (German: Grüne [ˈɡʁyːnə]), is a green political party in Germany. It was formed in 1993 by the merger of the Greens (formed in West Germany in 1980) and Alliance 90 (formed in East Germany in 1990). The Greens had itself merged with the East German Green Party after German reunification in 1990.

Since November 2024, Franziska Brantner and Felix Banaszak have been co-leaders of the party. It currently holds 85 of the 630 seats in the Bundestag, having won 11% of first votes and 11.6% of second votes cast in the 2025 federal election, putting it in fourth place of the seven political parties by number of seats. Its parliamentary co-leaders are Britta Haßelmann and Katharina Dröge. The Greens have been part of the federal government twice: first as a junior partner to the Social Democrats (SPD) from 1998 to 2005, and then with the SPD and the Free Democratic Party (FDP) in the traffic light coalition from the 2021 election until that coalition's collapse in 2024. In the Scholz cabinet, the Greens had five ministers, including Vice-Chancellor Robert Habeck and Foreign Minister Annalena Baerbock.

The party holds seats in most of Germany's state legislatures, except Saarland, Thuringia and Brandenburg, and is a member of coalition governments in seven states. Cem Özdemir, Minister-President of Baden-Württemberg, is the only Green head of government in Germany. The Landtag of Baden-Württemberg is also the only state legislature in which Alliance 90/The Greens is the largest party; it is the second largest party in the legislatures of Berlin, Hamburg and Schleswig-Holstein.

Alliance 90/The Greens is a founding member of the European Green Party and the Greens–European Free Alliance group in the European Parliament. It is currently the largest party in the G/EFA group, with 12 MEPs. In the 2019 European election, Alliance 90/The Greens was the second largest party in Germany, winning 20.5% of votes cast. The party had 166,000 members in February 2025, making it the third largest party in Germany by membership.

== History ==
=== Background ===
The Green Party was initially founded in West Germany as Die Grünen (the Greens) in January 1980. It grew out of the anti-nuclear energy, environmental, peace, new left, and new social movements of the late 20th century. More specifically, social and political movements that contributed to the milieu that produced the Greens included protests during the 1970s against Wyhl and Brokdorf Nuclear Power Plants, the nuclear waste processing facility at Gorleben and the construction of a new runway at Frankfurt Airport, and the grassroots civic Citizens' Initiative movement. Alternative left groups that flourished after the SPD abandoned Marxism, entered a grand coalition with the CDU/CSU under Christian Democratic chancellor Kurt Georg Kiesinger, and later banned radical activists from being employed as civil servants, also formed a movement that contributed to the party's formation, including the Außerparlamentarische Opposition, the West German student movement, the K-Groups and the Spontis, as did a broader alternative subculture that included collectives, cooperatives, communes, self-help groups, new religious movements and cultural organisations.

Between 1977 and 1979 local parties running on environmental and peace issues were established across West Germany. Although most environmental and anti-nuclear activists were initially sceptical of these efforts, a lack of results from pressure group activity and early electoral successes meant the approach gained momentum and led to local groups amalgamating into state-level parties.

Grüne Liste Umweltschutz (GLU - green list for environmental protection) was the name used for some branches in Lower Saxony and other states in the Federal Republic of Germany, including Hamburg, Hesse, North Rhine-Westphalia, Rhineland-Palatinate and Baden-Württemberg. These groups were founded in 1977 and took part in several elections. Most GLU activists had been involved in environmental protection activism, although it increasingly also attracted campaigners on social issues.

In July 1978 former Christian Democrat Herbert Gruhl founded Grüne Aktion Zukunft (GAZ - green action future) as the beginning of a process to establish a nationwide green party. Among the groups expressing interest in this were the Bundesverband Bürgerinitiativen Umweltschutz (BBU - federal association of citizen's initiatives for environmental protection), a movement of citizen's initiative groups focused on anti-nuclear and environmental issues, members of the anthroposophy movement, the Free International University, Spontis and disaffected Social Democrats.

In February 1979 an electoral alliance was established to contest the first democratic elections to the European Parliament later that year under the name Sonstige Politische Vereinigung Die Grünen (SPV-Die Grünen - alternative political alliance, the greens). This included GAZ, GLU, Grüne Liste Schleswig-Holstein and the Action Group of Independent Germans (a pro-neutrality pacifist political party which had adopted pro-environment policies in the 1970s and was predominantly present in southern Germany). Two members of the BBU's executive, Petra Kelly and Roland Vogt, also joined the alliance, and it was also supported by prominent writer Heinrich Böll and socialist activist Rudi Dutschke. However, not all local green groups supported the coalition, including the West Berlin Alternative Liste and the Bunte Liste (Multicoloured List) in Hamburg, the latter being a rival green party to the city's GLU branch. Both of these lists were heavily influenced by the activism of the Communist League. SPV-Die Grünen ran on a platform advocating a nuclear-free Europe and a Europe of the Regions, and scored 3.2 percent of the vote.

As German electoral law provided for a generous scheme for reimbursement of election expenses, providing them to all parties scoring at least 0.5 percent of the vote, the new formation netted 4.8 million deutschmarks, after spending just 300,000 on its campaign. This money was spent on establishing state and national party infrastructure. SPV-Die Grünen's success led to increased activist interest, with membership rising to around 10,000 by the end of 1979, and the Alternative and Multicoloured Lists showing more interest in joining forces with the other green groups.

A congress in October 1979 to agree a programme for the national party led to heated disagreements over economic orientation and non-violence and whether dual membership with other parties was to be permitted. Whilst the latter was resolved by agreeing to devolve decisions on membership to local branches, the former was overcome by the adoption of what would become known as the four pillars of green politics: ecology, social responsibility, grassroots democracy and non-violence. Journalist and activist August Haußleiter claimed to have proposed these and secured the agreement of the leaders of the right (Gruhl) and left (Jürgen Reents) factions at the conference. The nascent movement received a further boost the same month when the Bremer Grüne Liste became the first green party to win seats in a state parliament, securing four seats in Bremen's election.

=== 12–13 January 1980: Foundation congress ===
The political party The Greens (German: Die Grünen) sprung out of the wave of New Social Movements that were active in the 1970s, including environmentalist, anti-war, and anti-nuclear movements which can trace their origin to the student protests of 1968. Officially founded as a German national party on 13 January 1980 in Karlsruhe, the party sought to give these movements political and parliamentary representation, as the pre-existing people's parties were not organised in a way to address their stated issues. The party also championed sexual liberation and some of their members supported the abolition of age-of-consent laws.

In the foundational congress of 1980, the ideological tenets of the party were consolidated, proclaiming the famous Four Pillars of the Green Party:

- Social justice
- Ecological wisdom
- Grassroots democracy
- Nonviolence

=== 1980s: Parliamentary representation on the federal level ===
As the 1980s commenced, the movement built on their success in the 1979 Bremen state elections, winning six seats in the 1980 Baden-Württemberg state election and nine seats in the 1981 West Berlin state election, although the result in the 1980 West German federal election was disappointing, with only 1.5 percent of the vote scored.

The state electoral success in Hesse and Hamburg saw the party holding the balance of power in both states. In Hamburg the party won nine seats in the June 1982 election and made an offer of terms for confidence and supply to the Social Democrats, but these were rejected. At the following December election the Greens lost a seat and the SPD won an absolute majority. In Hesse the Greens rejected the idea of cooperating with the SPD after the 1982 election. Another state election took place there the following year, resulting in the Greens losing two seats but no party achieving a majority. Following the election the state Greens voted to accept a confidence and supply agreement with the Social Democrats. Although this was implemented in 1984 after long negotiations between the Greens and the SPD, with the former voting in favour of Holger Börner as minister-president and the SPD budget in June, the agreement broke down in December over subsidising the expansion of the Nukem / Alkem nuclear enrichment plant in Hanau. Despite this negotiations immediately commenced over terms for a coalition agreement.

Although the party's Bundestag faction had limited success in legislating during the new MPs' first term, they were able to influence debate inside and outside parliament through proposing bills and asking questions. In addition, Otto Schily's work as part of the parliamentary committee investigating the Flick affair, concerning illicit payments to the established German parliamentary parties by businessman Friedrich Karl Flick, was particularly notable, pressuring SPD colleagues to refrain from whitewashing the matter and scuppering an attempt by the Kohl government to pass an amnesty for those involved. However, the faction's efforts were disrupted by the attempt to implement rotation of members halfway through their terms as had been planned before the 1983 election. All elected Bundestag members except Petra Kelly stepped down to enable rotation, however of the seven Green MEPs elected in the 1984 European election only three resigned from their roles. The rotation stipulation was subsequently abolished, however the departure of many Bundestag members who had received significant media attention upon their entry to parliament led to reduced press interest in the parliamentary faction's work.

Progress was made in elections in 1984. As well as entering the European Parliament for the first time, the party increased their share of the vote from 5.3 to eight percent and took a total of nine seats in the 1984 Baden-Württemberg state election, whilst in local elections it exceeded the five percent electoral threshold for the first time in Saarland and Rhineland-Palatinate and scored over eight percent in North Rhine-Westphalia.

However, elections in 1985 brought mixed results. In the Saarland state election, SPD leader Oskar Lafontaine ran a campaign emphasising both socio-economic and environmental issues, declaring that "progress has a name... it is called eco-socialism", and led the party to 49.2 percent of the vote and an outright majority in the chamber for the first time, whilst the Greens could only muster 2.5 percent. Contrastingly, in the West Berlin elections, after the SPD rejected the Alternative List's terms for a confidence and supply agreement before polling day, the SPD scored their worst post-war result of 32.4 percent, whilst the Greens almost doubled their vote to 10.6 percent and took 15 seats. In the North Rhine-Westphalia state election, SPD leader Johannes Rau ran a campaign opposing cooperation with the Greens, whose campaign was hampered by two controversies, namely the inclusion of a proposal to abolish the age of consent in the state party's manifesto (which was subsequently removed by a hastily-called party congress) and the sending of a letter of outreach by federal MPs Antje Vollmer and Christa Nickels to Red Army Faction members who were on hunger strike in prison. Whilst the SPD won 52.1 percent of the vote, the Greens failed to meet the electoral threshold with 4.6 percent.

Meanwhile, in local elections in Hesse both the SPD and Greens made gains, with the vote of the latter rising to 7.1 percent. Shortly after Börner offered a coalition deal to the Greens which included the position of environment and energy minister. The Greens were divided about accepting the offer, particularly after a demonstrator, Günter Sarre, was killed by police at an anti-fascist protest in Hesse's largest city, Frankfurt in September: the state party accepted the coalition offer shortly afterwards, prompting a denunciation by Jutta Ditfurth on behalf of the federal party. Joschka Fischer took up the ministerial post, whilst Marita Haibach was made secretary of state for woman's affairs. At the federal party conference in Offenburg in December, the party's fundi faction, which had been hostile to the coalition agreement, took control of the party's executive.

In 1986, the intra-party conflict reduced somewhat. A party conference in Hanover that Easter voted for an immediate end to nuclear power and the end of the coalition in Hesse. In that year's Lower Saxony state election, the governing Christian Democrats mounted a smear campaign against the Greens, releasing details about party officials from police records, caricaturing party policy, and claiming that they were foreign agents of the Soviet Union and that the movement had both political and paramilitary wings along the lines of ETA. These attacks limited the party's gains to 0.6 percent of the vote, failing to add to the 11 seats won at the previous state election. However, in the Bavarian state election the party entered parliament for the first time, winning 7.5 percent of the vote and 15 seats, whilst in the Hamburg elections an all-female list secured 10.4 percent of votes and 13 seats, whilst neither the CDU or SPD secured a parliamentary majority.

Partly due to the impact of the Chernobyl disaster in 1986, and to growing awareness of the threat of air pollution and acid rain to German forests (Waldsterben), the Greens increased their share of the vote to 8.3% in the 1987 federal election, winning 42 seats plus two non-voting West Berlin delegates.

Following the federal election, factional tensions over strategy re-emerged. The Hesse party withdrew from their coalition with the SPD, over the same nuclear enrichment plant which had led to the collapse of the previous confidence and supply agreement. At the subsequent 1987 Hessian state election, the SPD vote declined, leading to a coalition of Christian Democrats and Free Democrats entering government, but the Green vote increased to 9.4 percent, securing them 10 seats. In the Hamburg election held to resolve the deadlock resulting from the previous year's poll, the Green vote dropped to 7.1 percent, losing them five seats, whilst the SPD and FDP were able to form a coalition. Meanwhile in Rhineland-Palatinate the Greens entered parliament for the first time, taking 5.9 percent of the vote and six seats. Later that year in state elections in Schleswig-Holstein the state Green party, which was opposed to participating in any coalition, failed to enter parliament and won only 3.9 percent of the vote, whilst in Bremen they almost doubled their vote to 10.2 percent and won ten seats.

Tensions were further inflamed by the killing of two police officers and injury of nine others by autonomist activists at a protest at Frankfurt Airport. Whilst the bulk of the party condemned the killings, some on the left including Ditfurth and Thomas Ebermann did not. The growing disagreements at the federal level resulted in a crisis meeting in December 1987, following by a perspective congress in June 1988.

The Greens were the target of attempts by the East German secret police to enlist the cooperation of members who were willing to align the party with the agenda of the German Democratic Republic. The party ranks included several politicians who were later discovered to have been Stasi agents, including Bundestag representative Dirk Schneider, European Parliament representative Brigitte Heinrich, and Red Army Faction defense lawyer Klaus Croissant. Greens politician and Bundestag representative Gert Bastian was also a founding member of Generals for Peace, a pacifist group created and funded by the Stasi, the revelation of which may have contributed to the murder-suicide in which he killed his partner and Greens founder Petra Kelly. A study commissioned by the Greens determined that 15 to 20 members intimately cooperated with the Stasi and another 450 to 500 had been informants.

Until 1987, the Greens included a faction involved in pedophile activism, the SchwuP short for Arbeitsgemeinschaft "Schwule, Päderasten und Transsexuelle" (approx. working group "Gays, Pederasts and Transsexuals"). This faction campaigned for repealing § 176 of the German penal code, dealing with child sexual abuse. This group was controversial within the party itself, and was seen as partly responsible for the poor election result of 1985. This controversy re-surfaced in 2013 and chairwoman Claudia Roth stated she welcomed an independent scientific investigation on the extent of influence pedophile activists had on the party in the mid-1980s. In November 2014, the political scientist Franz Walter presented the final report about his research on a press conference.

=== 1990s: German reunification, electoral failure in the West, formation of Alliance 90/The Greens ===
The 1990 GDR's Green Party logo

In the 1990 federal elections, taking place post-reunified Germany, the Greens in the West did not pass the 5% limit required to win seats in the Bundestag. It was only due to a temporary modification of German election law, applying the five-percent "hurdle" separately in East and West Germany, that the Greens acquired any parliamentary seats at all. This happened because in the new states of Germany, the Greens, in a joint effort with Alliance 90, a heterogeneous grouping of civil rights activists, were able to gain more than 5% of the vote. Some critics attribute this poor performance to the reluctance of the campaign to cater to the prevalent mood of nationalism, instead focusing on subjects such as global warming. A campaign poster at the time proudly stated, "Everyone is talking about Germany; we're talking about the weather!", paraphrasing a popular slogan of Deutsche Bundesbahn, the German national railway. The party also opposed imminent reunification that was in process, instead wanting to initiate debates on ecology and nuclear issues before reunification causing a drop in support in Western Germany. After the 1994 federal election; however, the merged party returned to the Bundestag, and the Greens received 7.3% of the vote nationwide and 49 seats.

=== 1998–2002: Greens as governing party, first term ===
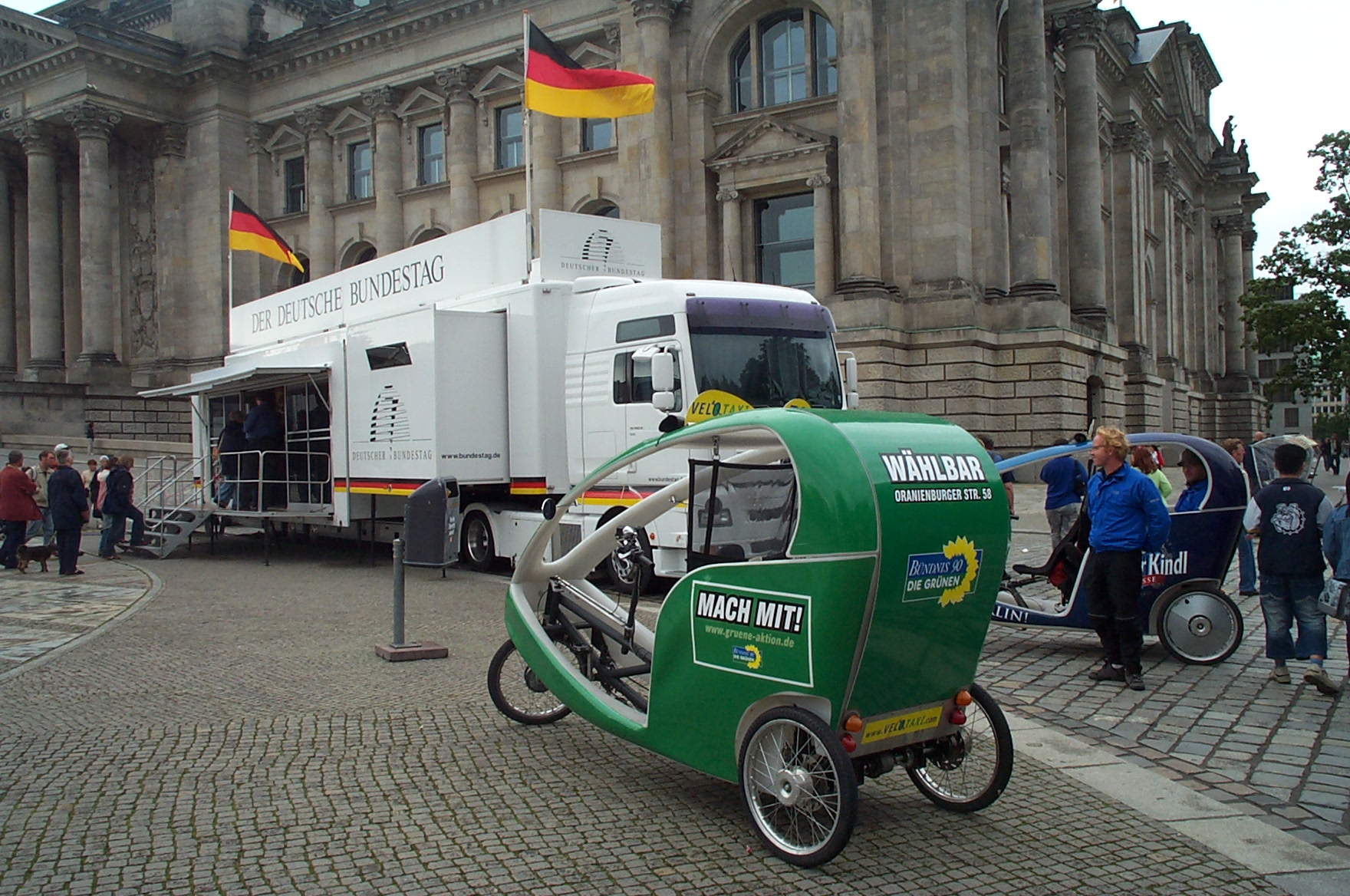
A cycle rickshaw (velotaxi) in front of the German Bundestag in Berlin with the Alliance 90/The Greens livery for the 2005 federal election

In the 1998 federal election, despite a slight fall in their percentage of the vote (6.7%), the Greens retained 47 seats and joined the federal government for the first time in 'Red-Green' coalition government with the Social Democratic Party of Germany (SPD). Joschka Fischer became Vice-Chancellor of Germany and foreign minister in the new government, which had two other Green ministers (Andrea Fischer, later Renate Künast, and Jürgen Trittin).

Almost immediately the party was plunged into a crisis by the question of German participation in the NATO actions in Kosovo. Numerous anti-war party members resigned their party membership when the first post-war deployment of German troops in a military conflict abroad occurred under a Red-Green government, and the party began to experience a long string of defeats in local and state-level elections. Disappointment with the Green participation in government increased when anti-nuclear power activists realised that shutting down the nation's nuclear power stations would not happen as quickly as they wished, and numerous pro-business SPD members of the federal cabinet opposed the environmentalist agenda of the Greens, calling for tacit compromises.

In 2001, the party experienced a further crisis as some Green Members of Parliament refused to back the government's plan of sending military personnel to help with the 2001 invasion of Afghanistan. Chancellor Gerhard Schröder called a vote of confidence, tying it to his strategy on the war. Four Green MPs and one Social Democrat voted against the government, but Schröder was still able to command a majority.

On the other hand, the Greens achieved a major success as a governing party through the 2000 decision to phase out the use of nuclear energy. Minister of Environment, Nature Conservation and Nuclear Safety Jürgen Trittin reached an agreement with energy companies on the gradual phasing out of the country's 19 nuclear power plants and a cessation of civil usage of nuclear power by 2020. This was authorised through the Nuclear Exit Law. Based on an estimate of 32 years as the normal period of operation for a nuclear power plant, the agreement defines precisely how much energy a power plant is allowed to produce before being shut down. This law has since been overturned.

=== 2002–2005: Greens as governing party, second term ===
Despite the crises of the preceding electoral period, in the 2002 federal election, the Greens increased their total to 55 seats (in a smaller parliament) and 8.6%. This was partly due to the perception that the internal debate over the war in Afghanistan had been more honest and open than in other parties, and one of the MPs who had voted against the Afghanistan deployment, Hans-Christian Ströbele, was directly elected to the Bundestag as a district representative for the Friedrichshain-Kreuzberg – Prenzlauer Berg East constituency in Berlin, becoming the first Green to ever gain a first-past-the-post seat in Germany.

The Greens benefited from increased inroads among traditionally left-wing demographics which had benefited from Green-initiated legislation in the 1998–2002 term, such as environmentalists (Renewable Energies Act) and LGBT groups (Registered Partnership Law). Perhaps most important for determining the success of both the Greens and the SPD was the increasing threat of war in Iraq, which was highly unpopular with the German public, and helped gather votes for the parties which had taken a stand against participation in this war. Despite losses for the SPD, the Red-Green coalition government retained a very slight majority in the Bundestag (4 seats) and was renewed, with Joschka Fischer as foreign minister, Renate Künast as minister for consumer protection, nutrition and agriculture, and Jürgen Trittin as minister for the environment.

One internal issue in 2002 was the failed attempt to settle a long-standing discussion about the question of whether members of parliament should be allowed to become members of the party executive. Two party conventions declined to change the party statute. The necessary majority of two-thirds was missed by a small margin. As a result, former party chairpersons Fritz Kuhn and Claudia Roth (who had been elected to parliament that year) were no longer able to continue in their executive function and were replaced by former party secretary general Reinhard Bütikofer and former Bundestag member Angelika Beer. The party then held a member referendum on this question in the spring of 2003 which changed the party statute. Now members of parliament may be elected for two of the six seats of the party executive, as long as they are not ministers or caucus leaders. 57% of all party members voted in the member referendum, with 67% voting in favor of the change. The referendum was only the second in the history of Alliance 90/The Greens, the first having been held about the merger of the Greens and Alliance 90. In 2004, after Angelika Beer was elected to the European Parliament, Claudia Roth was elected to replace her as party chair.

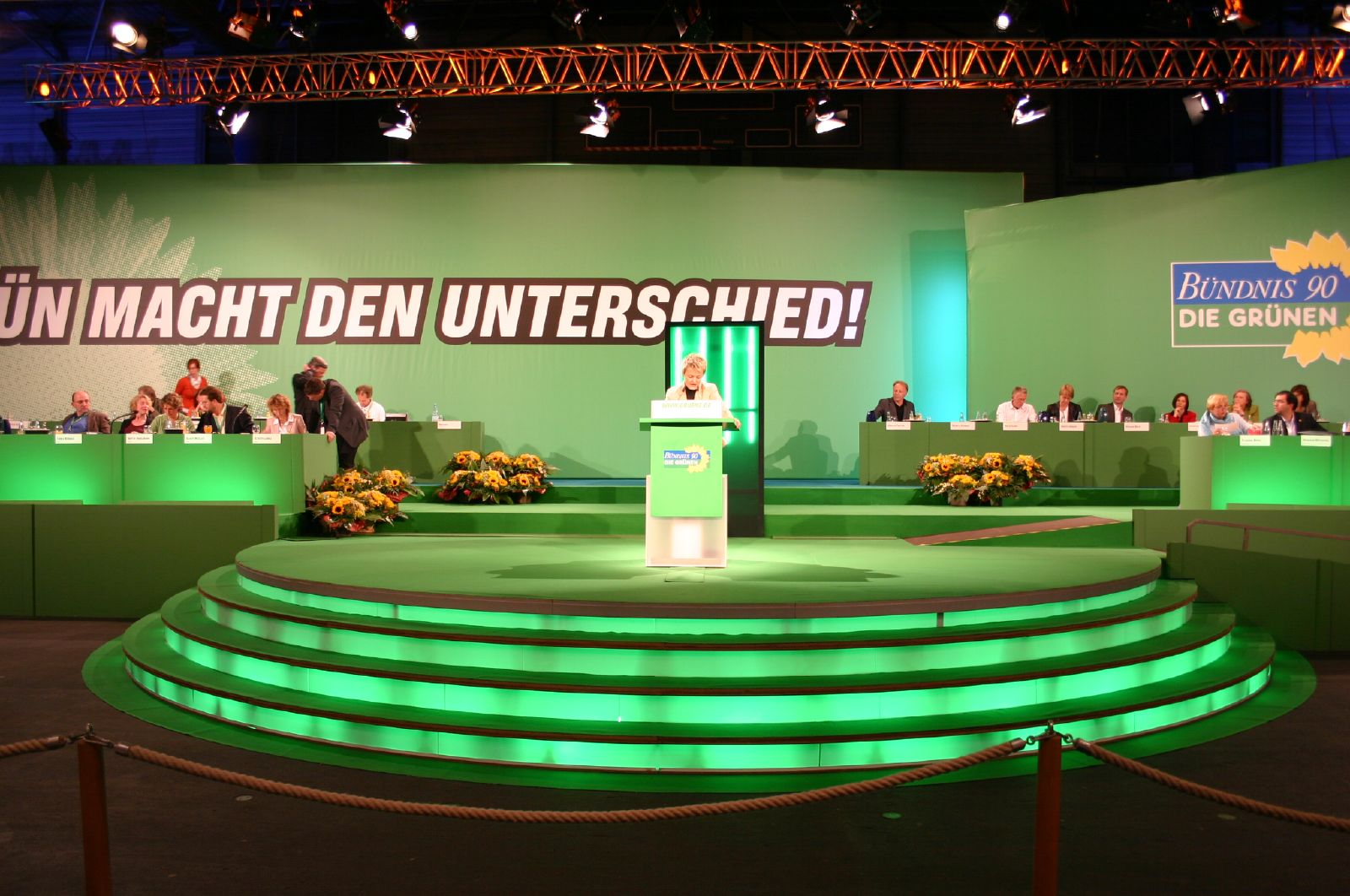
Federal party convention in Oldenburg; Renate Künast speaking (2005)

The only party convention in 2003 was planned for November 2003, but about 20% of the local organisations forced the federal party to hold a special party convention in Cottbus early to discuss the party position regarding Agenda 2010, a major reform of the German welfare programmes planned by Chancellor Schröder.

The November 2003 party convention was held in Dresden and decided the election platform for the 2004 European Parliament elections. The German Green list for these elections was headed by Rebecca Harms (then leader of the Green party in Lower Saxony) and Daniel Cohn-Bendit, previously Member of the European Parliament for The Greens of France. The November 2003 convention is also noteworthy because it was the first convention of a German political party ever to use an electronic voting system.

The Greens gained a record 13 of Germany's 99 seats in these elections, mainly due to the perceived competence of Green ministers in the federal government and the unpopularity of the Social Democratic Party.

In early 2005, the Greens were the target of the German Visa Affair 2005, instigated in the media by the Christian Democratic Union (CDU). At the end of April 2005, they celebrated the decommissioning of the Obrigheim nuclear power station. They also continue to support a bill for an Anti-Discrimination Law (Allgemeines Gleichbehandlungsgesetz) in the Bundestag.

In May 2005, the only remaining state-level red-green coalition government lost the vote in the North Rhine-Westphalia state election, leaving only the federal government with participation of the Greens (apart from local governments). In the early 2005 federal election the party incurred very small losses and achieved 8.1% of the vote and 51 seats. However, due to larger losses of the SPD, the previous coalition no longer had a majority in the Bundestag.

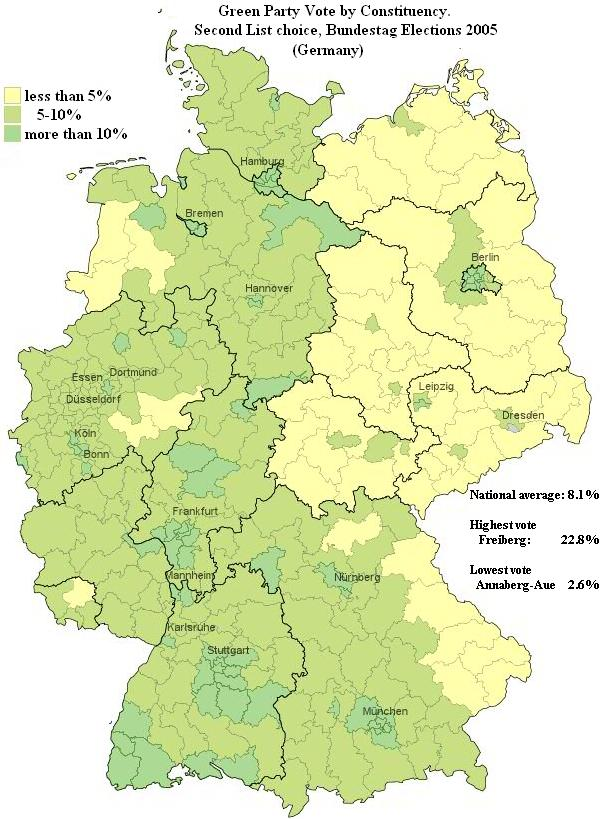
Map showing Alliance 90/The Greens vote in each of the German constituencies at the 2005 German federal election

=== 2005–2021: In opposition ===
Map showing Alliance 90/The Greens vote in each of the German constituencies at the 2009 German federal election

For almost two years after the federal election in 2005, the Greens were not part of any government at the state or federal level. In June 2007, the Greens in Bremen entered into a coalition with the Social Democratic Party (SPD) following the 2007 Bremen state election.

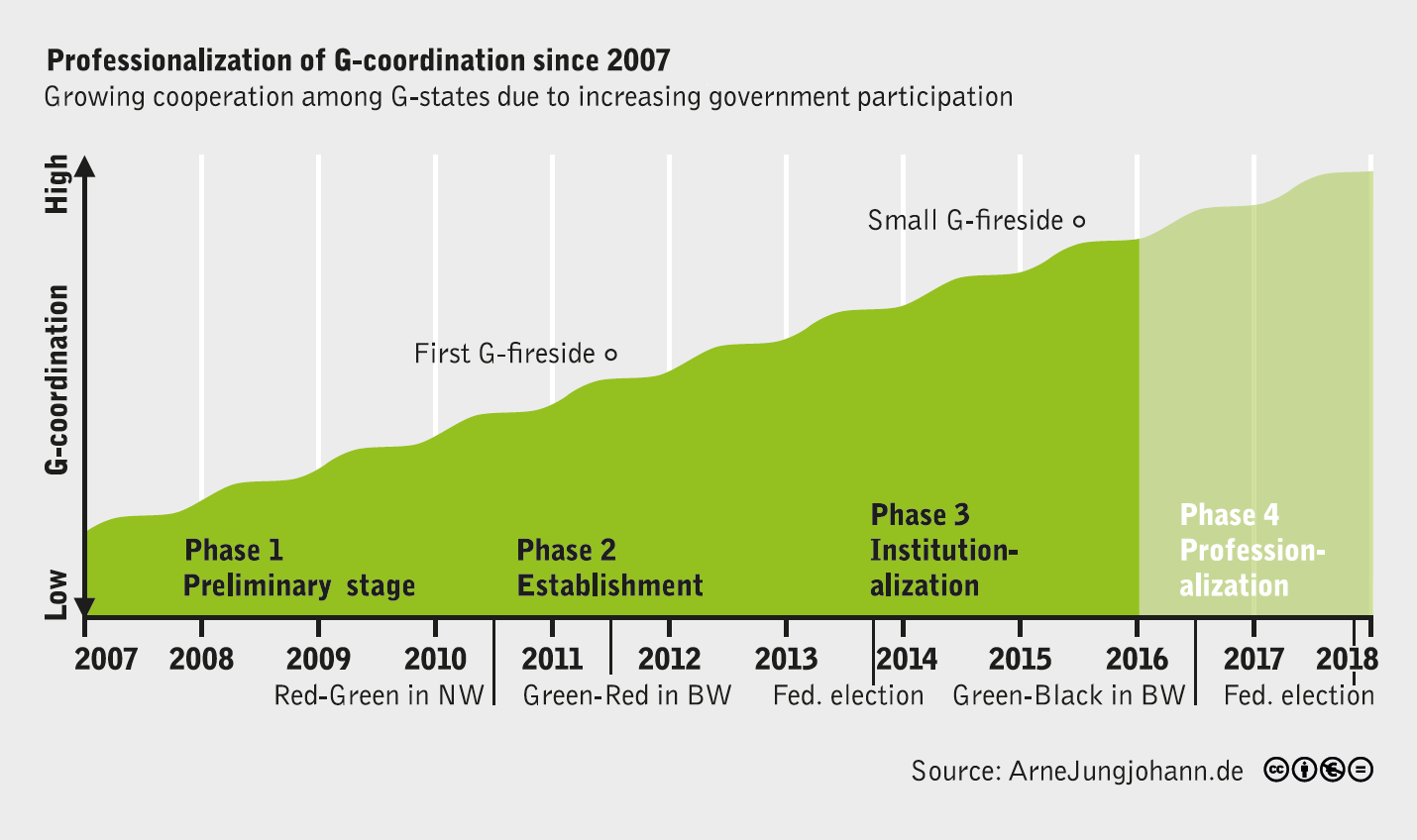
Professionalization of G-Coordination since 2007

In April 2008, following the 2008 Hamburg state election, the Green-Alternative List (GAL) in Hamburg entered into a coalition with the Christian Democratic Union (CDU), the first such state-level coalition in Germany. Although the GAL had to agree to the deepening of the Elbe River, the construction of a new coal-fired power station and two road projects they had opposed, they also received some significant concessions from the CDU. These included reforming state schools by increasing the number of primary school educational stages, the restoration of trams as public transportation in the city-state, and more pedestrian-friendly real estate development. On 29 November 2010, the coalition collapsed, resulting in an election that was won by SPD.

Following the Saarland state election of August 2009, The Greens held the balance of power after a close election where no two-party coalitions could create a stable majority government. After negotiations, the Saarland Greens rejected the option of a left-wing 'red-red-green' coalition with the SPD and The Left (Die Linke) in order to form a centre-right state government with the CDU and Free Democratic Party (FDP), a historical first time that a Jamaica coalition has formed in German politics.

In June 2010, in the first state election following the victory of the CDU/CSU and FDP in the 2009 federal election, the "black-yellow" CDU-FDP coalition in North Rhine-Westphalia under Jürgen Rüttgers lost its majority. The Greens and the SPD came one seat short of a governing majority, but after multiple negotiations about coalitions of SPD and Greens with either the FDP or The Left, the SPD and Greens decided to form a minority government, which was possible because under the constitution of North Rhine-Westphalia a plurality of seats is sufficient to elect a minister-president. So a red-green government in a state where it was defeated under Peer Steinbrück in 2005 came into office again on 14 June 2010 with the election of Hannelore Kraft as minister-president (Cabinet Kraft I).

The Greens founded the first international chapter of a German political party in the U.S. on 13 April 2008 at the Goethe-Institut in Washington D.C. Its main goal is "to provide a platform for politically active and green-oriented German citizens, in and beyond Washington D.C., to discuss and actively participate in German Green politics. [...] to foster professional and personal exchange, channeling the outcomes towards the political discourse in Germany."

In March 2011 (two weeks after the Fukushima nuclear disaster had begun), the Greens made large gains in Rhineland-Palatinate and in Baden-Württemberg. In Baden-Württemberg they became the senior partner in a governing coalition for the first time. Winfried Kretschmann is now the first Green to serve as Minister-President of a German State (Cabinet Kretschmann I and II). Polling data from August 2011 indicated that one in five Germans supported the Greens. From 4 October 2011 to 4 September 2016, the party was represented in all state parliaments.

Like the Social Democrats, the Greens backed Chancellor Angela Merkel on most bailout votes in the German parliament during her second term, saying their pro-European stances overrode party politics. Shortly before the elections, the party plummeted to a four-year low in the polls, undermining efforts by Peer Steinbrück's Social Democrats to unseat Merkel. While being in opposition on the federal level since 2005, the Greens have established themselves as a powerful force in Germany's political system. By 2016, the Greens had joined 11 out of 16 state governments in a variety of coalitions. Over the years, they have built up an informal structure called G-coordination to organize interests between the federal party office, the parliamentary group in the Bundestag, and the Greens governing on the state level.

The Greens remained the smallest of six parties in the Bundestag in the 2017 federal election, winning 8.9% of votes. After the election, they entered into talks for a Jamaica coalition with the CDU and FDP. Discussions collapsed after the FDP withdrew in November.

After the federal election and unsuccessful Jamaica negotiations, the party held elections for two new co-leaders; incumbents Özdemir and Peter did not stand for re-election. Robert Habeck and Annalena Baerbock were elected with 81% and 64% of votes, respectively. Habeck had served as deputy premier and environment minister in Schleswig-Holstein since 2012, while Baerbock had been a leading figure in the party's Brandenburg branch since 2009. Their election was considered a break with tradition, as they were both members of the moderate wing.

The Greens saw a major surge in support during the Bavarian and Hessian state elections in October 2018, becoming the second largest party in both. They subsequently rose to second place behind the CDU/CSU in national polling, averaging between 17% and 20% over the next six months.

A map showing the percentage of votes won by the Greens by district and state in the 2019 European Parliament election. Darker shades indicate a higher vote share.

In the 2019 European Parliament election, the Greens achieved their best ever result in a national election, placing second with 20.5% of the vote and winning 21 seats. National polling released after the election showed a major boost for the party. The first poll after the election, conducted by Forsa, showed the Greens in first place on 27%. This was the first time the Greens had ever been in first place in a national opinion poll, and the first time in the history of the Federal Republic that any party other than the CDU/CSU or SPD had placed first in a national poll. This trend continued as polls from May to July showed the CDU/CSU and Greens trading first place, after which point the CDU/CSU pulled ahead once more. The Greens continued to poll in the low 20% range into early 2020.

The Greens recorded best-ever results in the Brandenburg (10.8%) and Saxony (8.6%) state elections in September 2019, and subsequently joined coalition governments in both states. They suffered an unexpected decline in the Thuringian election in October, only narrowing retaining their seats with 5.2%. In the February 2020 Hamburg state election, the Greens became the second largest party, winning 24.2% of votes cast.

In March 2021, the Greens improved their performance in Baden-Württemberg, where they remained the strongest party with 32.6% of votes, and Rhineland-Palatinate, where they moved into third place with 9.3%.

Due to their sustained position as the second most popular party in national polling ahead of the September 2021 federal election, the Greens chose to forgo the traditional dual lead-candidacy in favour of selecting a single Chancellor candidate. Co-leader Annalena Baerbock was announced as Chancellor candidate on 19 April and formally confirmed on 12 June with 98.5% approval.

A map showing the percentage of votes won by the Greens by constituency and state in the 2021 federal election. Darker shades indicate a higher vote share.

The Greens surged in opinion polls in late April and May, briefly surpassing the CDU as the most popular party in the country, but their numbers slipped back after Baerbock was caught up in several controversies. Her personal popularity also fell below that of both Armin Laschet and Olaf Scholz, the Chancellor candidates for the CDU and SPD, respectively. The party's fortunes did not reverse even after the July floods, which saw climate change return as the most important issue among voters. The situation worsened in August as the SPD surged into first place to the detriment of both the CDU and Greens.

=== 2021–2025: Return to government ===
The Greens finished in third place in the 2021 federal election with 14.8% of votes. Though their best ever federal election result, it was considered a bitter disappointment in light of their polling numbers during the previous three years. They entered coalition talks with the FDP and SPD, eventually joining a traffic light coalition under Chancellor Olaf Scholz which took office on 8 December 2021. The Greens have five ministers in the Scholz cabinet, including Robert Habeck as Vice-Chancellor and Annalena Baerbock as foreign minister.

Since party statute mandates that party leaders may not hold government office, Baerbock and Habeck stepped down after entering cabinet. At a party conference in January 2022, Ricarda Lang and Omid Nouripour were elected to succeed them. At the time of her election, Lang was 28 years old, speaker for women's issues, and a former leader of the Green Youth. 46-year-old Nouripour was foreign affairs spokesman and a member of the Bundestag since 2006. Of the new leaders, Lang is considered a representative of the party's left-wing, while Nouripour represents the right-wing.

Lang and Nouripour announced their resignations as party leaders in September 2024 after heavy defeats in the Saxony, Thuringia and Brandenburg state elections that month, as well as the earlier European Parliament election. In all three states, governing coalitions involving the Greens were not returned, and the party was wiped out in the latter two states while only narrowly retaining representation in Saxony. In the European elections, the Greens fell to fourth (behind the CDU/CSU, AfD and SPD) and lost 9 seats in the European parliament, falling to 12 seats. The party had fallen out of five state governments (additionally Berlin and Hesse) since entering the federal governing coalition in 2021. Analysts pointed to its participation in the federal government requiring it to take stances that are contrary to its traditional clean-energy and pacifist ideals, as well as a stark collapse in support with young voters.

Felix Banaszak and Franziska Brantner elected as co-leaders in November 2024. During the 2024 government crisis, in which the FDP left the traffic light coalition, the Greens stayed in a red-green minority coalition. The party abstained in the succeeding vote of no confidence, ensuring the government's collapse and the calling of the 2025 federal election.

=== 2025–present: Return to opposition ===
The party chose incumbent Vice Chancellor Robert Habeck as their chancellor candidate for the 2025 federal election. The Greens would go on to lose 33 seats in that election, garnering 11.6% of the vote. The unpopularity of the Scholz cabinet has been credited with the result, although this was still the party's second best ever result. The morning after the election, Habeck announced his withdrawal from the party's leadership. The other co-candidate for The Greens, Annalena Baerbock, as well as former party leader Ricarda Lang, were expected to become the next party leaders in the Bundestag.

== Ideology and platform ==
The party's main ideological trends are green politics and social liberalism. The party has also been described as left-libertarian, and influenced by the postmaterialist left. The party's political position is generally described to be centre-left, while others describe the party as centrist or left-wing. The Greens originated as a left-wing protest party in the 1980s but have since evolved into a centre-left party, especially after merging with Alliance 90 in 1993. The West German Greens played a crucial role in the development of green politics in Europe, with their original program outlining "four principles: ecological, social, grassroots, and non-violent".

Writing in the late 1980s, Sara Parkin characterised the factional divides in the party as occurring along three axes: the strategic divide between fundis and realos, the left–right political spectrum, and the existence of affinity groups. She described the fundi perspective as one that stressed the importance of the green critique of existing developed industrial society and the Green's initial philosophy of being an "anti-party party" (in the words of fundi Petra Kelly) which was radically different from traditional political parties. From this view, watering down a radical worldview risked a failure to take sufficiently drastic action in the face of environmental crisis. As Kelly put it, "It does not help us in any way if we begin accepting lower and safer levels of, for example, radioactivity... We must speak out clear, loudly and courageously, if we know there are no safe levels".

Fundis also express concern about losing touch with grassroots activists, and in Germany particularly emphasise solidarity with groups they consider to be victimised by the state, resulting in them being less likely to condemn use of violence by protest movements than realos. According to Parkin, fundis were particularly prevalent on state and federal committees and executive bodies and formed a minority in parliamentary parties. Along with Kelly, other prominent fundis in the early years of the party included Rudolf Bahro (who colourfully described compromise as "cleaning the dragon's teeth and wiping away its excrement"), Jutta Ditfurth, Lukas Beckmann and Claudia Roth and the tendency also included the factional organisation Left Forum.

Realos are reformists who argue that the appropriate response to ecological crisis is to take action within the existing political system, and that to do otherwise is to condemn the green movement to irrelevance. They stress the importance of going beyond critique to develop practical solutions to environmental and other problems. They additionally advocate for professionalisation of the party organisation, and believe in maintaining a certain distance from social movements.

The most centrist realos like Joschka Fischer and Otto Schily were branded as "superrealos", and placed particular emphasis on moderating party positions to ensure that the party was a realistic potential coalition partner to the SPD, as well as questioning the party's early opposition to NATO, advocating outreach to yuppies and eco-capitalism. In Schily's case the development of his beliefs led him to leave the Greens for the SPD. Other realos like Christa Vennegerts argued for clarification and development of policies in key areas such as economics and defence.

Other Greens associated with the realo faction include Daniel Cohn-Bendit, Wolf-Dieter Hasenclever, Waltraud Schoppe, Rezzo Schlauch and Hubert Kleinert, as well as the thinktank the Institute for Social-Ecological Research. One policy area that has been of particular interest to realos is the area of work, with proposals such as shortening the working week and introduction of a guaranteed minimum income as responses to structural economic changes in post-industrial capitalism, as advocated by realo-leaning social scientists including Claus Offe and Helmut Wiesenthal. According to Parkin realos constituted the majority of party members and elected officials.

In addition, during the 1980s a third intermediate faction emerged, labelled variously as "neutralos", "zentralos" or "aufbruch" (the latter after their manifesto Aufbruch 88) focused on preventing the conflict between fundis and realos from splitting the party and seeking to emphasise common ground. This group was particularly associated with Antje Vollmer and stressed a stronger concentration on ecological issues. Y. Michal Bondemann suggested that this faction reflected the development of a party bureaucracy, cadre and career politicians in the Greens.

In terms of the left-right spectrum, the left wing of the party was strengthened by an influx of radical left activists into the party when it was formed. Whilst some contributed to the development of new perspectives through dialogue with environmental activists, others hewed closer to their pre-existing ideology whilst within the party, such as the Z Group which had originated as a breakaway from the Communist League. The Z Group was subject to a party tribunal in 1981 considering whether they should be expelled, which eventually decided against this. Prominent figures in this group included Thomas Ebermann and Rainer Trampert. Ebermann and Trampert were both leftists and fundis, as was Jutta Ditfurth. Other more moderate eco-socialists were aligned with the realos on strategic questions. The right of the party was weakened by the splitting of the value conservative wing led by Herbert Gruhl into the Ecological Democratic Party, but continued to be represented by a smaller eco-libertarian faction advocating a more conservative liberal approach to ecology which was particularly strong in Baden-Württemberg. This faction, officially established in 1984, opposed socialism and social security.

These conflicts became less significant as the party moved toward the political mainstream in the 1990s. This was mainly due to the weakening of the fundis leading to the realos establishing control of the party. In 1988 accusations of financial irregularities within the party were made by the news magazine Der Spiegel and also by Cohn-Bendit. Although an investigative commission rejected the claims in October, at party congress in Karlsruhe in December Ditfurth accused the realos of supplying false information to Der Spiegel in a speech which was poorly received by delegates. The congress passed a motion of no confidence and the fundi controlled Federal Executive Committee resigned en bloc, resulting in the faction losing one of their biggest strongholds within the party.

Realo control over the party was secured after its poor performance in the first federal election in the reunified Germany in 1990, when the West and East German Greens ran separately and the former failed to cross the electoral threshold and elected any Bundestag members. The Realos' position was also strengthened by the party's vote holding up in the 1991 state election in Hesse, a realo stronghold, opinion polling indicating that green voters supported a constructive approach regarding coalition formation and the influx of East German Greens, often with backgrounds in Protestant churches, which strengthened the realos and right wing of the party. As a result the realos were able to pass reforms at the 1991 party congress in Neumünster which reflected their thinking, including reducing the number of party spokespersons from three to two, appointing a political director to lead management of the party and the establishing of a federal party council (Bundesparteirat) with members drawn from state parliamentary factions and party committees, tilting their composition towards the realos. This period also saw many fundis leave the party, including Trampert, Ebermann and Ditfurth (who together founded a new party, Ecological Left) and others in the eco-socialist stronghold of Hamburg: some turned to the reformed ex-ruling party in East Germany, the Party of Democratic Socialism, including Left Forum. Paul Hockenos has suggested that this period saw the end of the fundi-realo dimension of struggle within the party, although left-right contestation continued. After this period, the party moved away from pacifism, supporting EU military cooperation and military interventions in Yugoslavia and Afghanistan, and watered down its commitment to other non-environmental issues such as feminism and social justice.

During the 2021 federal election, the WZB Berlin Social Science Center classified the party as the most centrist of Germany's left-wing parties. Annalena Baerbock campaigned from the left of the SPD, stating that the party's economic program is geared towards the "common good" while the SPD's no longer is. The party has a more pragmatic approach to workers' rights than the SPD. On the other hand, the party clearly holds positions to the left of the SPD on issues such as fiscal discipline, particularly on the debt brake, the climate transition, and property expropriation in Berlin. They are focusing on environmentalist and socially progressive policies. Emphasis is placed on mitigating climate change, reducing carbon emissions, and fostering sustainability and environmentally-friendly practices. They support equality, social justice, and humanitarian responses to events such as the European migrant crisis. Their fiscal platform is flexible and seeks to balance social, economic, and environmental interests. The party is strongly pro-European, advocating European federalism, and promotes wider international cooperation, including strengthening existing alliances.

Starting from the leadership of Annalena Baerbock and Robert Habeck, commentators have observed the Greens taking a pragmatic, moderate approach to work with parties from across the political spectrum. Baerbock described their stances and style as a form of "radical realism" attempting to reconcile principles with practical politics. At the same time, the party has denounced populism and division, and placed rhetorical emphasis on optimism and cross-party cooperation. Accompanied by record high popularity and election results, this led some to suggest that the Greens were filling a gap in the political centre, which was left by the declining popularity of the CDU/CSU and SPD.

=== Economic policies ===
The party has economically left-liberal views.

=== Foreign policy ===
The Greens are regarded as taking a Atlanticist line on defense and pushing for a stronger common EU foreign policy, especially against Russia and China. Former Green Party co-leader Annalena Baerbock proposed a post-pacifist foreign policy. She supports eastward expansion of NATO and has considered the number of UN resolutions critical of Israel as "absurd compared to resolutions against other states." The party's program included references to NATO as an "indispensable" part of European security. The Greens have promised to abolish the contested Nord Stream 2 pipeline to ship Russian natural gas to Germany. The party criticized the EU's investment deal with China. It describes China as a "systematic rival", though the party also favors cooperation with China to fight climate change. In 2016, the Greens criticised Germany's defense plan with Saudi Arabia, which has been waging war in Yemen and has been accused of massive human rights violations.

The party remains divided over issues such as nuclear disarmament and U.S. nuclear weapons on German territory. Some Greens want Germany to sign the United Nations' Treaty on the Prohibition of Nuclear Weapons. About the Gaza war, the Federal Minister of Food and Agriculture Cem Özdemir (member and former president of the party) criticized Swedish climate activist Greta Thunberg for her presence and support of pro-Palestinian demonstrations in Berlin, calling on everyone to reconsider their opinions about her.

=== Energy and nuclear power ===
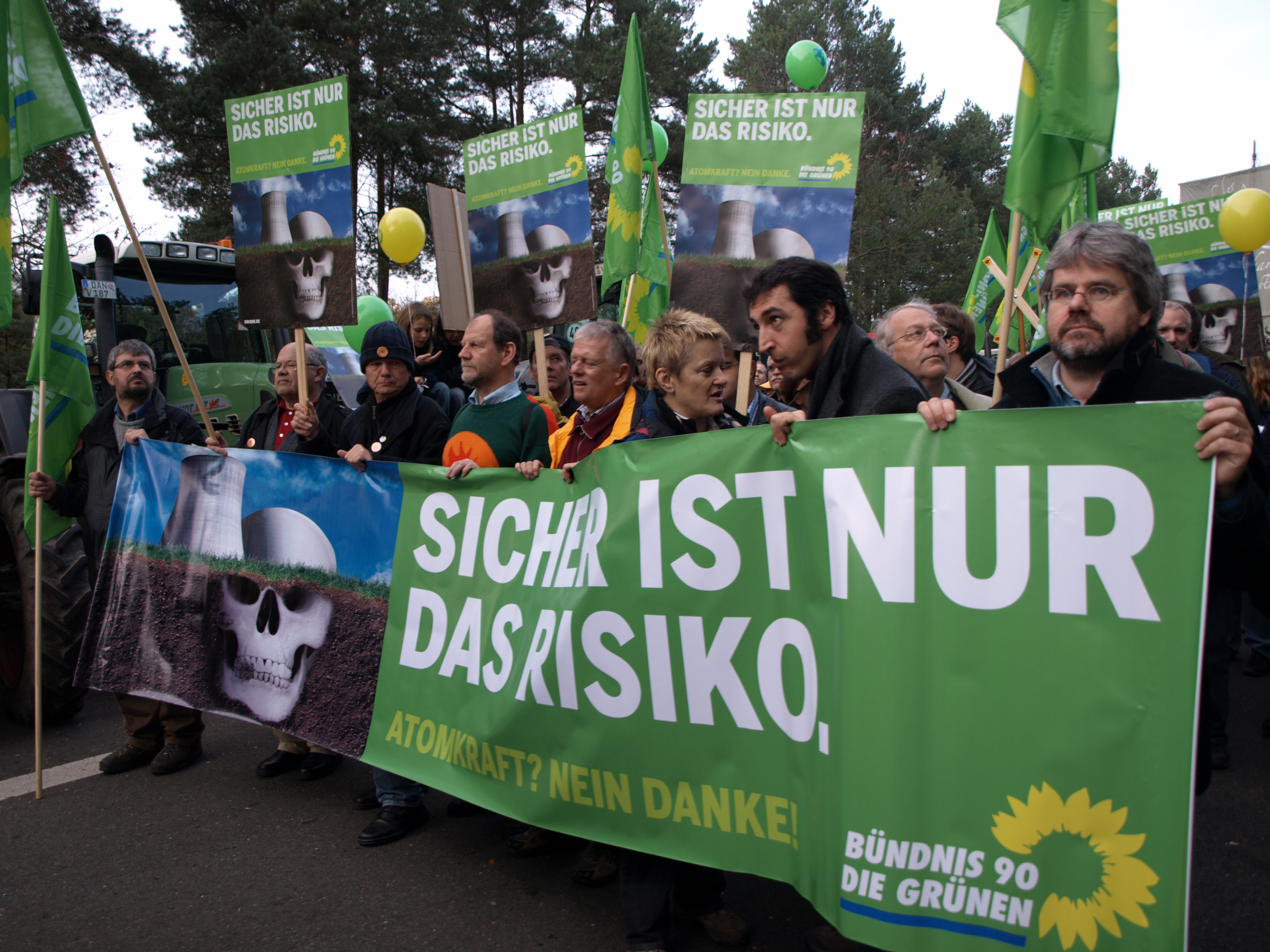
Anti-nuclear protest near nuclear waste disposal centre at Gorleben in northern Germany, on 8 November 2008

Ever since the party's inception, The Greens have been concerned with the immediate halt of construction or operation of all nuclear power stations. As an alternative, they promote a shift to non-nuclear renewable energy and a comprehensive program of energy conservation.

Eight German nuclear power reactors (Biblis A and B, Brunsbuettel, Isar 1, Kruemmel, Neckarwestheim 1, Philippsburg 1 and Unterweser) were declared permanently shut down on 6 August 2011, following the Japanese Fukushima nuclear disaster.

=== Environment and climate policy ===
The central idea of green politics is sustainable development.

=== European Union ===
Alliance 90/The Greens supports the eventual federalization of the European Union into a Federal European Republic (German: Föderale Europäische Republik), i.e. a single federal European sovereign state.

=== Transport ===
Green Party policy states that fossil fuels such as heavy oil or diesel shall be replaced by emission-neutral fuels and green propulsion systems in order to make shipping climate-neutral in the long term.

=== Social policy ===
For many years, the Green Party has advocated against the "Ehegattensplitting" policy, under which the incomes of married couples are split for taxation purposes. Furthermore, the Party advocates for a massive increase in federal spending for places in preschools, and for increased investment in education: an additional 1 billion Euros for vocational schools and 200 million Euros more BAföG (Bundesausbildungsförderungsgesetz in German, approximately translated to "the Federal Law for the Advancement of Education") for adults.

In its 2013 platform, the Green Party successfully advocated for a minimum wage of 8.50 euros per hour, which was implemented on 1 January 2015. It continues to press for higher minimum wages.

The Greens want the starting retirement age to remain 67, but with some qualifications – for example, a provision for partial retirement.

The party supports and has supported various forms of rent regulation. During the 2021 election, the party called for rent hikes to be capped at 2.5% per year.

The Greens support progressive taxation and is critical of FDP efforts to cut taxes for top earners.

=== Women and LGBTQIA+ rights ===
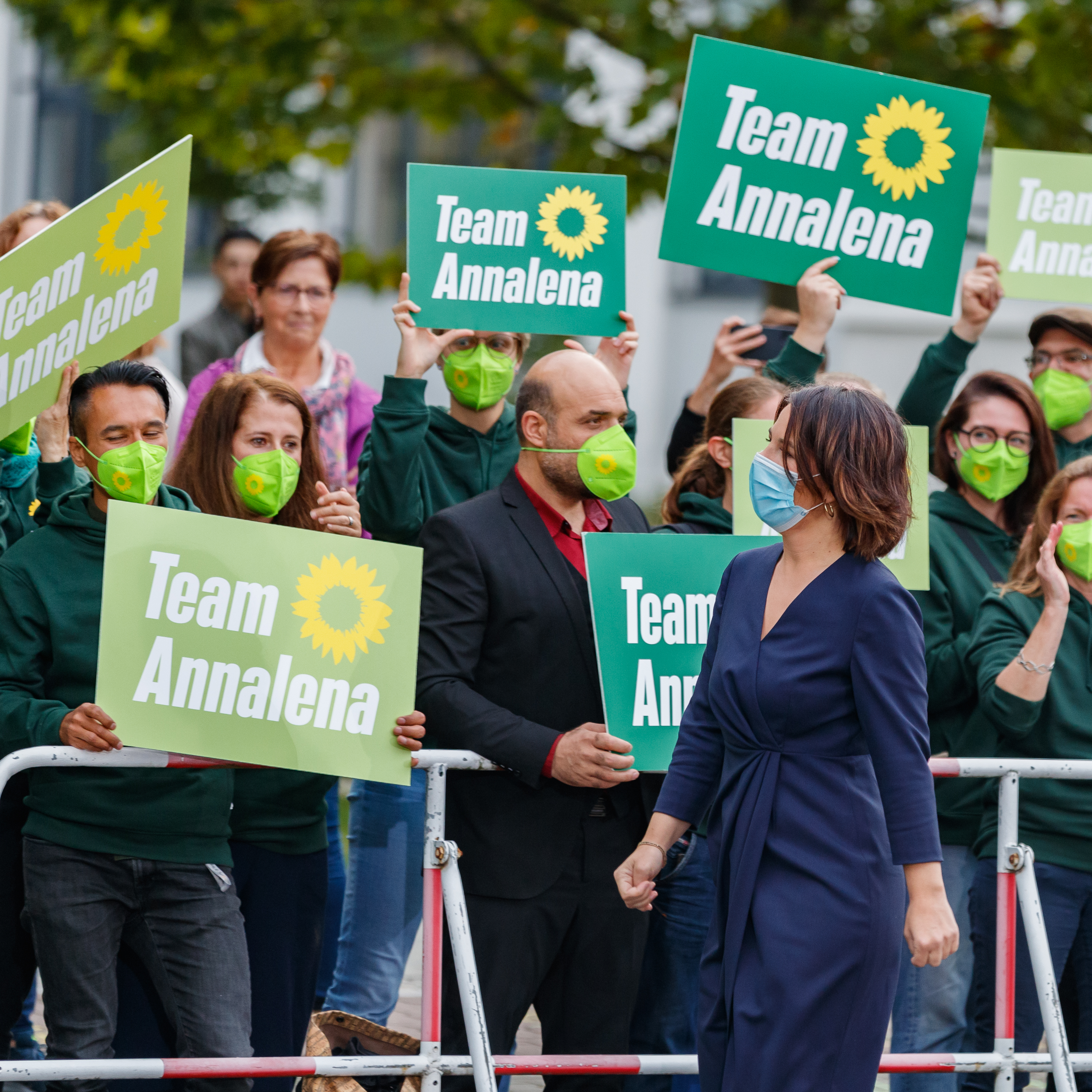
Green supporters supporting Annalena Baerbock in 2021

The Green Party supports the implementation of quotas in executive boards, the policy of equal pay for equal work, and continuing the fight against domestic violence. According to its website, the Green Party "fights for the acceptance and against the exclusion of homosexuals, bisexuals, intersex- and transgender people and others".

In order to recognize the political persecution that LGBT+ people face abroad, the Green Party wants to extend asylum to LGBTQIA+ people abroad. The policy change was sponsored primarily by Volker Beck, one of the Party's most prominent gay members. Because of the extensive support the Green Party has given the LGBTQIA+ community since its conception, many LGBTQIA+ people vote for the Green Party even if their political ideology does not quite align otherwise.

=== Drug policy ===
The party supports the legalization and regulation of cannabis and was the sponsor of the 2015 proposed iteration of the German cannabis control bill. Furthermore, the Greens support research on the drug and the use of marijuana for medicinal purposes.

== Electorate ==
A 2000 study by the Infratest Dimap political research company has suggested the Green voter demographic includes those on higher incomes (e.g. above €2,000/month) and the party's support is less among households with lower incomes. The same polling research also concluded that the Greens received fewer votes from the unemployed and general working population, with business people favouring the party as well as the centre-right liberal Free Democratic Party. According to the Infratest Dimap political research company for the ARD, the Greens received more voters from the age group 34–42 than any other age group and that the young were generally more supportive of the party than the old.

The Greens have more support concentrated in metropolitan areas rather than rural areas, except for a small number of rural areas with critical local environmental concerns, such as strip mining or radioactive waste deposits. The cities of Bonn, Cologne, Stuttgart, Berlin, Hamburg, Frankfurt and Munich have among the highest percentages of Green voters in the country. Large towns with Green mayors as of March 2026 include Hanover, Kassel, Munich and Münster.

== Election results ==
=== Federal parliament (Bundestag) ===
Election	Constituency		Party list		Seats	+/–	Status
Election	Votes	%	Votes	%	Seats	+/–	Status
1980	732,619	1.0 (#5)	569,589	1.5 (#5)	0 / 497	Steady	No seats
1983	1,609,855	4.1 (#5)	2,167,431	5.6 (#5)	27 / 498	▲27	Opposition
1987	2,649,459	7.0 (#4)	3,126,256	8.3 (#5)	42 / 497	▲15	Opposition
1990^{[a]}	2,589,912	5.6 (#5)	2,347,407	5.0 (#4)	8 / 662	▼36	Opposition
1994	3,037,902	6.5 (#4)	3,424,315	7.3 (#4)	49 / 672	▲41	Opposition
1998	2,448,162	5.0 (#4)	3,301,624	6.7 (#4)	47 / 669	▼2	SPD–Greens
2002	2,693,794	5.6 (#5)	4,108,314	8.6 (#4)	55 / 603	▲8	SPD–Greens
2005	2,538,913	5.4 (#5)	3,838,326	8.1 (#5)	51 / 614	▼4	Opposition
2009	3,974,803	9.2 (#5)	4,641,197	10.7 (#5)	68 / 622	▲17	Opposition
2013	3,177,269	7.3 (#5)	3,690,314	8.4 (#4)	63 / 630	▼5	Opposition
2017	3,717,436	8.0 (#6)	4,157,564	8.9 (#6)	67 / 709	▲4	Opposition
2021	6,465,502	14.0 (#3)	6,848,215	14.7 (#3)	118 / 735	▲51	SPD–Greens–FDP (2021–24)
2021	6,465,502	14.0 (#3)	6,848,215	14.7 (#3)	118 / 735	▲51	SPD–Greens (2024–25)
2025	5,442,912	11.0 (#4)	5,761,476	11.6 (#4)	85 / 630	▼33	Opposition

^{a} Results of Alliance 90/The Greens (East) and The Greens (West)

=== European Parliament ===
Election	Votes	%	Seats	+/–	EP Group
1979	893,683	3.21 (#5)	0 / 81	New	–
1984	2,025,972	8.15 (#4)	7 / 81	▲7	RBW
1989	2,382,102	8.45 (#3)	8 / 81	▲1	G
1994	3,563,268	10.06 (#3)	12 / 99	▲4	G
1999	1,741,494	6.44 (#4)	7 / 99	▼5	Greens/EFA
2004	3,078,276	11.94 (#3)	13 / 99	▲6	Greens/EFA
2009	3,193,821	12.13 (#3)	14 / 99	▲1	Greens/EFA
2014	3,138,201	10.69 (#3)	11 / 96	▼3	Greens/EFA
2019	7,675,584	20.53 (#2)	21 / 96	▲10	Greens/EFA
2024	4,736,913	11.90 (#4)	12 / 96	▼9	Greens/EFA

=== State parliaments (Länder) ===
State parliament	Election	Votes	%	Seats	+/–	Status
Baden-Württemberg	2026	1,585,903	32.6 (#1)	56 / 157	▼2	Greens–CDU
Bavaria	2023	1,972,147	14.4 (#4)	32 / 203	▼6	Opposition
Berlin	2026	260,700	14.3 (#4)	25 / 153	▼9	TBD
Brandenburg	2024	62,031	4.1 (#5)	0 / 88	▼10	No seats
Bremen	2023	150,263	11.9 (#3)	11 / 87	▼5	SPD–Greens–Left
Hamburg	2025	805,783	18.5 (#3)	25 / 121	▼8	SPD–Greens
Hesse	2023	415,888	14.8 (#4)	22 / 133	▼7	Opposition
Lower Saxony	2022	526,923	14.5 (#3)	24 / 146	▲12	SPD–Greens
Mecklenburg-Vorpommern	2026	57,587	5.6 (#5)	5 / 71		SPD–Left–Greens
North Rhine-Westphalia	2022	1,299,821	18.2 (#3)	39 / 195	▲25	CDU–Greens
Rhineland-Palatinate	2026	160,067	7.9 (#4)	10 / 105	0	Opposition
Saarland	2022	22,598	4.995 (#4)	0 / 51	0	No seats
Saxony	2024	119,964	5.1 (#5)	7 / 120	▼5	Opposition
Saxony-Anhalt	2026	117,498	8.9 (#4)	8 / 83	▲2	TBD
Schleswig-Holstein	2022	254,124	18.3 (#2)	14 / 69	▲4	CDU–Greens
Thuringia	2024	38,289	3.2 (#6)	0 / 88	▼5	No seats

=== Results timeline ===
Year	(Germany) DE		(European Union) EU	(Baden-Württemberg) BW	(Bavaria) BY	(Berlin) BE	(Brandenburg) BB	(Bremen (state)) HB	(Hamburg) HH	(Hesse) HE	(Lower Saxony) NI	(Mecklenburg-Vorpommern) MV	(North Rhine-Westphalia) NW	(Rhineland-Palatinate) RP	(Saarland) SL	(Saxony) SN	(Saxony-Anhalt) ST	(Schleswig-Holstein) SH	(Thuringia) TH
Year	(West Germany) WD	(East Germany) DD	(European Union) EU	(Baden-Württemberg) BW	(Bavaria) BY	(Berlin) BE	(Brandenburg) BB	(Bremen (state)) HB	(Hamburg) HH	(Hesse) HE	(Lower Saxony) NI	(Mecklenburg-Vorpommern) MV	(North Rhine-Westphalia) NW	(Rhineland-Palatinate) RP	(Saarland) SL	(Saxony) SN	(Saxony-Anhalt) ST	(Schleswig-Holstein) SH	(Thuringia) TH
1978	N/A	N/A	N/A	N/A	1.8	N/A	N/A	N/A	4.6	2.0	3.9	N/A	N/A	N/A	N/A	N/A	N/A	N/A	N/A
1979	N/A	N/A	3.2	N/A	1.8	3.7	N/A	6.5	4.6	2.0	3.9	N/A	N/A	N/A	N/A	N/A	N/A	2.4	N/A
1980	1.5	N/A	3.2	5.3	1.8	3.7	N/A	6.5	4.6	2.0	3.9	N/A	3.0	N/A	2.9	N/A	N/A	2.4	N/A
1981	1.5	N/A	3.2	5.3	1.8	▲7.2	N/A	6.5	4.6	2.0	3.9	N/A	3.0	N/A	2.9	N/A	N/A	2.4	N/A
1982	1.5	N/A	3.2	5.3	▲4.6	▲7.2	N/A	6.5	▲7.7	▲8.0	▲6.5	N/A	3.0	N/A	2.9	N/A	N/A	2.4	N/A
1982	1.5	N/A	3.2	5.3	▲4.6	▲7.2	N/A	6.5	▼6.8	▲8.0	▲6.5	N/A	3.0	N/A	2.9	N/A	N/A	2.4	N/A
1983	▲5.6	N/A	3.2	5.3	▲4.6	▲7.2	N/A	▼5.4		▼5.9	▲6.5	N/A	3.0	4.5	2.9	N/A	N/A	▲3.6	N/A
1984	▲5.6	N/A	▲8.2	▲8.0	▲4.6	▲7.2	N/A	▼5.4		▼5.9	▲6.5	N/A	3.0	4.5	2.9	N/A	N/A	▲3.6	N/A
1985	▲5.6	N/A	▲8.2	▲8.0	▲4.6	▲10.6	N/A	▼5.4			▲6.5	N/A	▲4.6	4.5	▼2.5	N/A	N/A	▲3.6	N/A
1986	▲5.6	N/A	▲8.2	▲8.0	▲7.5	▲10.6	N/A	▼5.4	▲10.4		▲7.1	N/A	▲4.6	4.5	▼2.5	N/A	N/A	▲3.6	N/A
1987	▲8.3	N/A	▲8.2	▲8.0	▲7.5	▲10.6	N/A	▲10.2	▼7.0	▲9.4	▲7.1	N/A	▲4.6	▲5.9	▼2.5	N/A	N/A	▲3.9	N/A
1988	▲8.3	N/A	▲8.2	▼7.9	▲7.5	▲10.6	N/A	▲10.2	▼7.0	▲9.4	▲7.1	N/A	▲4.6	▲5.9	▼2.5	N/A	N/A	▼2.9	N/A
1989	▲8.3	N/A	▲8.4	▼7.9	▲7.5	▲11.8	N/A	▲10.2	▼7.0	▲9.4	▲7.1	N/A	▲4.6	▲5.9	▼2.5	N/A	N/A	▼2.9	N/A
1990	▼5.0	4.9 (Note: Combined results for Alliance 90 and the East German Green Party)	▲8.4	▼7.9	▼6.4	▼9.4	9.2	▲10.2	▼7.0	▲9.4	▼5.5	**9.3**	▲5.0	▲5.9	▲2.6	5.6	5.3	▼2.9	**6.5**
1991			▲8.4	▼7.9	▼6.4	▼9.4		▲11.2	▲7.2	▼8.8		**9.3**	▲5.0	▲6.5	▲2.6	5.6	5.3	▼2.9	**6.5**
1992			▲8.4	▲9.5	▼6.4	▼9.4			▲7.2			**9.3**	▲5.0	▲6.5	▲2.6	5.6	5.3	▲5.0	**6.5**
1993			▲8.4	▲9.5	▼6.4	▼9.4			▲13.5			**9.3**	▲5.0	▲6.5	▲2.6	5.6	5.3	▲5.0	**6.5**
1994	▲7.3		▲10.1	▲9.5	▼6.1	▼9.4	▼2.9		▲13.5		▲7.4	▼3.7	▲5.0	▲6.5	▲5.5	▼4.1	▼5.1	▲5.0	▼4.5
1995	▲7.3		▲10.1	▲9.5	▼6.1	▲13.2	▼2.9	▲13.1	▲13.5	▲11.2	▲7.4	▼3.7	▲10.0	▲6.5	▲5.5	▼4.1		▲5.0	▼4.5
1996	▲7.3		▲10.1	▲12.1	▼6.1	▲13.2	▼2.9	▲13.1	▲13.5		▲7.4	▼3.7		▲6.9	▲5.5	▼4.1		▲8.1	▼4.5
1997	▲7.3		▲10.1	▲12.1	▼6.1	▲13.2	▼2.9	▲13.1	▲13.9		▲7.4	▼3.7		▲6.9	▲5.5	▼4.1			▼4.5
1998	▼6.7		▲10.1	▲12.1	▼5.7	▲13.2	▼2.9	▲13.1			▼7.0	▼2.7		▲6.9	▲5.5	▼4.1	▼3.2		▼4.5
1999			▼6.4	▲12.1	▼5.7	▼9.9	▼1.9	▼8.9		▼7.2	▼7.0	▼2.7		▲6.9	▼3.2	▼2.6	▼3.2		▼1.9
2000			▼6.4	▲12.1	▼5.7	▼9.9	▼1.9	▼8.9		▼7.2	▼7.0	▼2.7	▼7.1	▲6.9	▼3.2	▼2.6	▼3.2	▼6.2	▼1.9
2001			▼6.4	▼7.7	▼5.7	▼9.1	▼1.9	▼8.9	▼8.6	▼7.2	▼7.0	▼2.7		▼5.2	▼3.2	▼2.6	▼3.2		▼1.9
2002	▲8.6		▼6.4	▼7.7	▼5.7	▼9.1	▼1.9	▼8.9	▼8.6	▼7.2	▼7.0	▼2.6		▼5.2	▼3.2	▼2.6	▼2.0		▼1.9
2003			▼6.4	▼7.7	▲7.7	▼9.1	▼1.9	▲12.8	▼8.6	▲10.1	▲7.6	▼2.6		▼5.2	▼3.2	▼2.6	▼2.0		▼1.9
2004			▲11.9	▼7.7	▲7.7	▼9.1	▲3.6	▲12.8	▲12.3	▲10.1	▲7.6	▼2.6		▼5.2	▲5.6	▲5.1	▼2.0		▲4.5
2005	▼8.1		▲11.9	▼7.7	▲7.7	▼9.1	▲3.6	▲12.8	▲12.3	▲10.1	▲7.6	▼2.6	▼6.2	▼5.2	▲5.6	▲5.1	▼2.0	6.2	▲4.5
2006	▼8.1		▲11.9	▲11.7	▲7.7	▲13.1	▲3.6	▲12.8	▲12.3	▲10.1	▲7.6	▲3.4	▼6.2	▼4.6	▲5.6	▲5.1	▲3.6	6.2	▲4.5
2007	▼8.1		▲11.9	▲11.7	▲7.7	▲13.1	▲3.6	▲16.5	▲12.3	▲10.1	▲7.6	▲3.4	▼6.2	▼4.6	▲5.6	▲5.1	▲3.6	6.2	▲4.5
2008	▼8.1		▲11.9	▲11.7	▲9.4	▲13.1	▲3.6		▼9.6	▼7.5	▲8.0	▲3.4	▼6.2	▼4.6	▲5.6	▲5.1	▲3.6	6.2	▲4.5
2009	▲10.7		▲12.1	▲11.7	▲9.4	▲13.1	▲5.7			▲13.7	▲8.0	▲3.4	▼6.2	▼4.6	▲**5.9**	▲6.4	▲3.6	▲12.4	▲6.2
2010	▲10.7		▲12.1	▲11.7	▲9.4	▲13.1	▲5.7			▲13.7	▲8.0	▲3.4	▲12.1	▼4.6		▲6.4	▲3.6	▲12.4	▲6.2
2011	▲10.7		▲12.1	▲24.2	▲9.4	▲17.6	▲5.7	▲**22.5**	▲11.2	▲13.7	▲8.0	▲8.7	▲12.1	▲**15.4**		▲6.4	▲7.1	▲12.4	▲6.2
2012	▲10.7		▲12.1		▲9.4	▲17.6	▲5.7		▲11.2	▲13.7	▲8.0	▲8.7	▼11.3		▼5.0	▲6.4	▲7.1	▲13.2	▲6.2
2013	▼8.4		▲12.1		▼8.6	▲17.6	▲5.7		▲11.2	▼11.1	▲13.7	▲8.7			▼5.0	▲6.4	▲7.1		▲6.2
2014	▼8.4		▼10.7		▼8.6	▲17.6	▲6.2		▲11.2			▲8.7			▼5.0	▼5.7	▲7.1		▼5.7
2015	▼8.4		▼10.7		▼8.6	▲17.6	▲6.2	▼15.1	▲12.3			▲8.7			▼5.0	▼5.7	▲7.1		
2016	▼8.4		▼10.7	▲30.3	▼8.6	▼15.2	▲6.2					▼4.8		▼5.3	▼5.0	▼5.7	▼5.2		
2017	▲8.9		▼10.7		▼8.6		▲6.2				▼8.7	▼4.8	▼6.4		▼4.0	▼5.7		▼12.9	
2018	▲8.9		▼10.7		▲**17.6**		▲6.2			▲**19.8**	▼8.7	▼4.8	▼6.4		▼4.0	▼5.7			
2019	▲8.9		▲**20.5**		▲**17.6**		▲**10.8**	▲17.4			▼8.7	▼4.8	▼6.4		▼4.0	▲**8.6**			▼5.2
2020	▲8.9		▲**20.5**		▲**17.6**				▲**24.2**		▼8.7	▼4.8	▼6.4		▼4.0				
2021	▲**14.7**		▲**20.5**	▲**32.6**	▲**17.6**	▲**18.9**					▼8.7	▲6.3	▼6.4	▲9.3	▼4.0		▲5.9		
2022			▲**20.5**		▲**17.6**	▲**18.9**					▲**14.5**	▲6.3	▲**18.2**		▲5.0		▲5.9	▲**18.3**	
2023			▲**20.5**		▼14.4	▼18.4		▼11.9		▼14.8		▲6.3			▲5.0		▲5.9		
2024			▼11.9		▼14.4	▼18.4	▼4.1			▼14.8		▲6.3			▲5.0	▼5.1	▲5.9		▼3.2
2025	▼11.6		▼11.9		▼14.4	▼18.4	▼4.1		▼18.5	▼14.8		▲6.3			▲5.0	▼5.1	▲5.9		▼3.2
2026	▼11.6		▼11.9	▼30.2	▼14.4	▼14.3	▼4.1		▼18.5	▼14.8		▼5.7		▼7.9	▲5.0	▼5.1	▲**8.9**		▼3.2
Year	(Germany) DE		(European Union) EU	(Baden-Württemberg) BW	(Bavaria) BY	(Berlin) BE	(Brandenburg) BB	(Bremen (state)) HB	(Hamburg) HH	(Hesse) HE	(Lower Saxony) NI	(Mecklenburg-Vorpommern) MV	(North Rhine-Westphalia) NW	(Rhineland-Palatinate) RP	(Saarland) SL	(Saxony) SN	(Saxony-Anhalt) ST	(Schleswig-Holstein) SH	(Thuringia) TH
**Bold** indicates best result to date. Present in legislature (in opposition); Junior coalition partner Senior coalition partner

=== States (Länder) ===
The Greens, Alliance 90 and Alliance 90/The Greens in government
Length	State/Federation	Coalition partner(s)
1985–1987	Hesse	SPD (Cabinet Börner III)
1989–1990	Berlin	Alternative List for Democracy and Environment Protection with SPD (Senate Momper)
1990–1994	Lower Saxony	SPD (Cabinet Schröder I)
1990–1994	Brandenburg	Alliance 90 with SPD and FDP (Cabinet Stolpe I)
1991–1999	Hesse	SPD (Cabinets Eichel I and II)
1991–1995	Bremen	SPD and FDP (Senate Wedemeier III)
1994–1998	Saxony-Anhalt	SPD (Cabinet Höppner I), minority government supported by PDS
1995–2005	North Rhine-Westphalia	SPD (Cabinets Rau V, Clement I and II, Steinbrück)
1996–2005	Schleswig-Holstein	SPD (Cabinets Simonis II and III)
1997–2001	Hamburg	SPD (Senate Runde)
1998–2005	**Federal Government**	SPD (Cabinets Schröder I and II)
2001–2002	Berlin	SPD (Senate Wowereit I), minority government supported by PDS
2007–2019	Bremen	SPD (Senates Böhrnsen II and III and Sieling)
2008–2010	Hamburg	CDU (Senates von Beust III and Ahlhaus)
2009–2012	Saarland	CDU and FDP (Cabinets Müller III and Kramp-Karrenbauer)
2010–2017	North Rhine-Westphalia	SPD [Cabinets Kraft I (minority government with changing majorities) and II]
2011–2016	Baden-Württemberg	SPD (Cabinet Kretschmann I) (**Greens as leading party**)
2011–2016	Rhineland-Palatinate	SPD (Cabinets Beck V and Dreyer I)
2012–2017	Schleswig-Holstein	SPD and SSW (Cabinet Albig)
2013–2017	Lower Saxony	SPD (Cabinet Weil I)
2014–2024	Hesse	CDU (Cabinet Bouffier II, III, and Rhein I)
2014–2020	Thuringia	Left and SPD (Cabinet Ramelow I)
since 2015	Hamburg	SPD (Senates Scholz II, Tschentscher I and II)
since 2016	Baden-Württemberg	CDU (Cabinets Kretschmann II and III, Özdemir) (**Greens as leading party**)
2016–2026	Rhineland-Palatinate	SPD and FDP (Cabinets Dreyer II and III, Schweitzer)
2016–2021	Saxony-Anhalt	CDU and SPD (Cabinet Haseloff II)
2016–2023	Berlin	SPD and Linke (Senates Müller II and Giffey)
2017–2022	Schleswig-Holstein	CDU and FDP (Cabinet Günther I)
since 2019	Bremen	SPD and Left (Senate Bovenschulte)
2019–2024	Brandenburg	SPD and CDU (Cabinet Woidke III)
2019–2024	Saxony	CDU and SPD (Cabinet Kretschmer II)
2020–2024	Thuringia	Left and SPD (Cabinet Ramelow II)
2021–2025	**Federal Government**	SPD and FDP (Cabinet Scholz)
since 2022	North Rhine-Westphalia	CDU (Cabinet Wüst II)
since 2022	Schleswig-Holstein	CDU (Cabinet Günther II)
since 2022	Lower Saxony	SPD (Cabinets Weil III and Lies)
since 2026	Mecklenburg-Vorpommern	SPD (Cabinet Schwesig III)

== Leadership (1993–present) ==
Leaders		Year
Ludger Volmer	Marianne Birthler	1993–1994
Jürgen Trittin	Krista Sager	1994–1996
Jürgen Trittin	Gunda Röstel	1996–1998
Antje Radcke	Gunda Röstel	1998–2000
Fritz Kuhn	Renate Künast	2000–2001
Fritz Kuhn	Claudia Roth	2001–2002
Reinhard Bütikofer	Angelika Beer	2002–2004
Reinhard Bütikofer	Claudia Roth	2004–2008
Cem Özdemir	Claudia Roth	2008–2013
Cem Özdemir	Simone Peter	2013–2018
Robert Habeck	Annalena Baerbock	2018–2022
Omid Nouripour	Ricarda Lang	2022–2024
Felix Banaszak	Franziska Brantner	2024–present

== See also ==
- Anti-nuclear movement
- Green party
- Green Party faction (Bundestag)
- Green Youth (Germany)
- List of German Green Party politicians
- Federal Executive Committee of Alliance 90/The Greens
- List of political parties in Germany
- History of environmentalism in Germany
