= Federal Executive Committee of Alliance 90/The Greens =

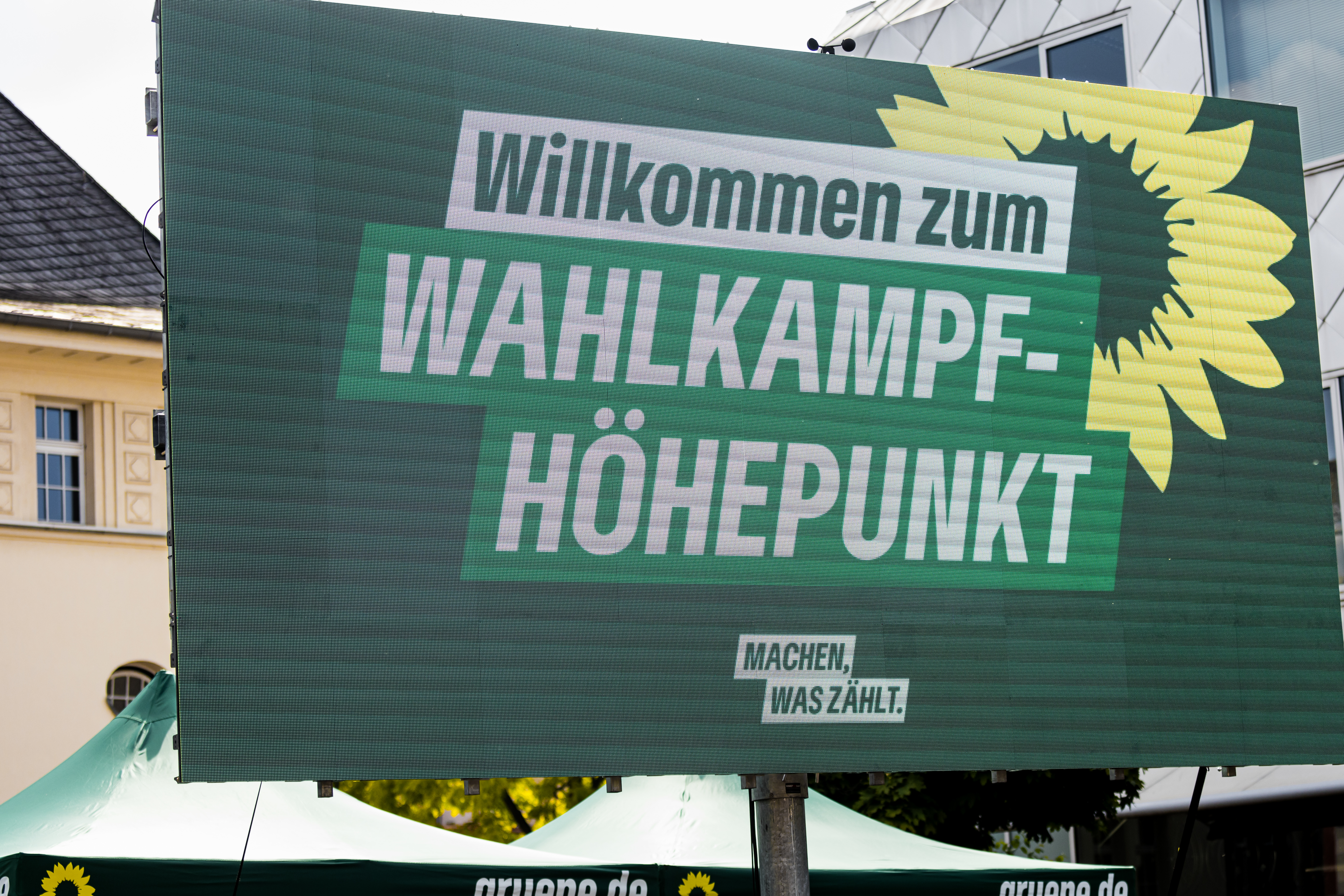
The Alliance 90/The Greens is governed by the Federal Executive Committee

The Federal Executive Committee of Alliance 90/The Greens (often also referred to as the Federal Executive Committee of the Greens) (German: Bundesvorstand von Bündnis 90/Die Grünen) leads the party Alliance 90/The Greens in Germany. It implements the decisions of the Federal Delegates' Conference (party conference) and the Federal Council and also adopts its own decisions on important political issues. The Federal Executive Committee convenes the Federal Delegates' Conference.

== Composition ==
=== Members ===
According to the federal statutes of the Greens the following members belong to the Federal Executive Committee, who are elected every two years by the Federal Delegates' Conference:

- the two federal chairpersons,
- the Federal Political Director,
- the Federal Treasurer,
- the two deputy federal chairpersons.

Compared to the executive boards of other parties such as the CDU/CSU , and SPD, the Green Party's federal executive board, with its six members, is relatively small and thus more akin to a party presidium . Its work is advised by the party council, which, however, consists of 16 members and therefore more closely resembles a typical party executive board.

The Federal Delegates' Conference elects from among the members of the Federal Executive Committee a spokesperson for women's policy (who must be a woman), a spokesperson for diversity policy, and a European and international coordinator.

=== Women's quota ===
According to the statutes, the Federal Executive Committee may consist of no more than two members of the Bundestag, a Landtag, or the European Parliament. Membership on the Federal Executive Committee is generally incompatible with the following offices: Chair of a parliamentary group in the Bundestag, chair of a state parliament, chair of the parliamentary group in the European Parliament, member of the Federal Government, member of a state government, member of the European Commission.

=== Incompatibilities ===
According to the statutes, the Federal Executive Committee may consist of no more than two members of the Bundestag, a state parliament, or the European Parliament. Membership on the Federal Executive Committee is generally incompatible with the following offices: Chair of a parliamentary group in the Bundestag, chair of a state parliament, chair of the parliamentary group in the European Parliament, member of the Federal Government, member of a state government, member of the European Commission.

== Members of the current Federal Executive Board ==
Name	Role	Photo
Felix Banaszak	Federal Chairman	
Franziska Brantner	Federal Chairwoman	
Pegah Edalatian	Federal Political Director	
Manuela Rottmann	Federal Treasurer	
Sven Giegold	Deputy Federal Chairman	
Heiko Knopf	Deputy Federal Chairman	

== List of Federal Chairpersons ==
Term of office	Federal Chairperson (until 2001: Federal Spokesperson)
1979	Herbert Gruhl, August Haußleiter, Helmut Neddermeyer (managing spokespersons of the SPV The Greens )
1980	August Haußleiter (after his resignation in June 1980: Dieter Burgmann), Petra Kelly, Norbert Mann
1981–1982	Dieter Burgmann, Petra Kelly, Manon Maren-Grisebach
1982–1983	Manon Maren-Grisebach, Wilhelm Knabe, Rainer Trampert
1983–1984	Wilhelm Knabe, Rainer Trampert, Rebekka Schmidt
1984–1987	Rainer Trampert, Lukas Beckmann, Jutta Ditfurth
1987–1989	Jutta Ditfurth, Regina Michalik, Christian Schmidt (after the resignation of the board in December 1988, the Federal Executive Committee took over the office on a provisional basis)
1989–1990 (East German Green Party)	Marianne Dörfler, Carlo Jordan, Gerd Klötzer, Vollrad Kuhn, Henry Schramm, Christine Weiske (provisional spokesperson council)
1989–1990	Ralf Fücks, Ruth Hammerbacher, Verena Krieger
1990 (East German Green Party)	Judith Demba, Friedrich Heilmann, Viktor Leibrenz, Dorit Nessing-Stranz, Henry Schramm, Christine Weiske; Vera Wollenberger (Press Officer)
1990–1991	Renate Damus, Heide Rühle, Hans-Christian Ströbele
1991–1993	Ludger Volmer, Christine Weiske
1991–1993 (Alliance 90)	Marianne Birthler, Wolfgang Ullmann, Gerd Poppe, Werner Schulz, Katrin Göring-Eckardt, Christiane Ziller, Petra Morawe, Burghardt Brinksmeier, Uwe Lehmann
1993–1994	Marianne Birthler, Ludger Volmer
1994–1996	Krista Sager, Jürgen Trittin
1996–1998	Jürgen Trittin, Gunda Röstel
1998–2000	Gunda Röstel, Antje Radcke
2000–2001	Renate Künast, Fritz Kuhn
2001–2002	Fritz Kuhn, Claudia Roth
2002–2004	Angelika Beer, Reinhard Bütikofer
2004–2008	Reinhard Bütikofer, Claudia Roth
2008–2013	Claudia Roth, Cem Özdemir
2013–2018	Cem Özdemir, Simone Peter
2018–2022	Annalena Baerbock, Robert Habeck
2022–2024	Ricarda Lang, Omid Nouripour
since 2024	Felix Banaszak, Franziska Brantner
