= 1984 European Parliament election in West Germany =

| ← 1979 | 17 June 1984 | 1989 → |

All 81 German seats in the European Parliament
- Turnout: 56.8%
| | First party | Second party | Third party |
|---|---|---|---|
| Party | CDU/CSU | SPD | Greens |
| Alliance | EPP | SOC | RBW |
| Seats before | 42 | 35 | 0 |
| Seats won | 41 | 33 | 7 |
| Seat change | ▼1 | ▼2 | ▲7 |
| Popular vote | 11,417,541 | 9,296,417 | 2,025,972 |
| Percentage | 46.0% | 37.4% | 8.2% |
| Swing | ▼3.2% | ▼3.4% | ▲5.0% |

An election of the delegation from West Germany to the European Parliament was held in 1984.

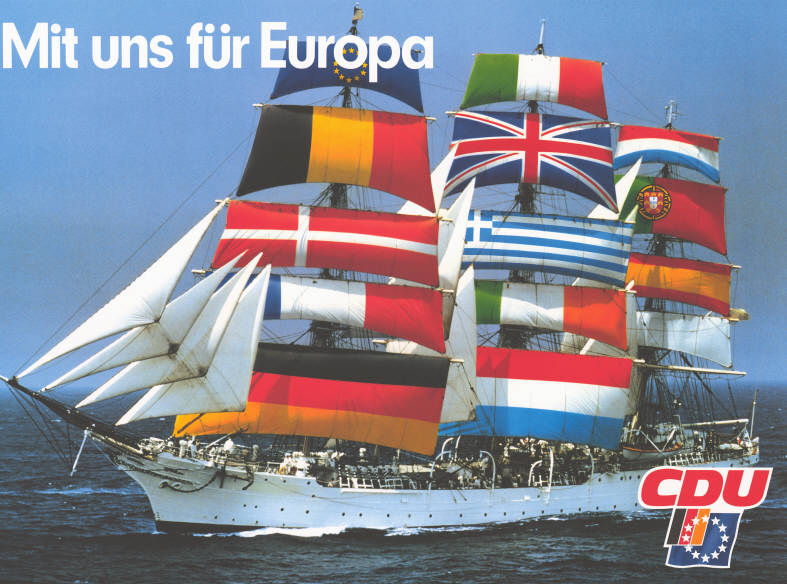
CDU poster in the 1984 election

== Results ==
| Party or alliance | | Votes | % | Seats | +/– |
|---|---|---|---|---|---|
| EPP | Christian Democratic Union | 9,308,411 | 37.46 | 32 | 0 |
| SOC | Social Democratic Party | 9,296,417 | 37.41 | 32 | –2 |
| EPP | Christian Social Union | 2,109,130 | 8.49 | 7 | –1 |
| RBW | The Greens | 2,025,972 | 8.15 | 7 | +7 |
| LD | Free Democratic Party | 1,192,624 | 4.80 | 0 | –4 |
| NI | Peace List | 313,108 | 1.26 | 0 | New |
| NI | National Democratic Party | 198,633 | 0.80 | 0 | New |
| NI | Women's Party | 94,463 | 0.38 | 0 | New |
| NI | Centre Party | 93,921 | 0.38 | 0 | 0 |
| NI | Ecological Democratic Party | 77,026 | 0.31 | 0 | New |
| NI | Mature Citizens | 52,753 | 0.21 | 0 | New |
| NI | European Federalist Party | 34,500 | 0.14 | 0 | New |
| NI | European Workers' Party | 30,874 | 0.12 | 0 | 0 |
| NI | Bavaria Party | 23,539 | 0.09 | 0 | New |
| Total | | 24,851,371 | 100.00 | 78 | 0 |
| Valid votes | | 24,851,371 | 98.47 | | |
| Invalid/blank votes | | 387,383 | 1.53 | | |
| Total votes | | 25,238,754 | 100.00 | | |
| Registered voters/turnout | | 44,465,989 | 56.76 | | |
Source: Federal Statistics Office

West Berlin, due to its special status, was ineligible to participate in the election. Instead, the city legislature indirectly elected three members:

| Party or alliance | | Seats | +/– |
|---|---|---|---|
| EPP | Christian Democratic Union | 2 | 0 |
| SOC | Social Democratic Party | 1 | 0 |
| Total | | 3 | 0 |
Source: Wahlen-in-Deutschland.de
