= Value conservatism =

Political philosophy

Value conservatism is a political philosophy and a variety of conservatism that emphasises the permanence of alleged or actual values of a society which it wants to preserve or restore. It stands in contrast to structural conservatism and social conservatism.

== Origins ==
The German term for value conservatism, "Wertkonservatismus", was first coined in 1975 by Social Democratic politician Erhard Eppler in his book Ende oder Wende ("End or Turn"). He described policies that were intended to preserve nature, the human community and the dignity of the individual as value conservative. He applied this description to the environmental and peace movements of the 1970s. Eppler concluded that this form of conservatism desired to uproot power structures in order to conserve specific values.

Eppler attacked the conservative camp in Germany as "structurally conservative", being more interested in preserving their own power structures. He negatively connoted the term of "structural conservative", accusing the conservatives of clinging onto established structures and being hostile to modernisation. Eppler further concluded that "structural conservatives" wished to "conserve privileges, positions of power, and their rule." Conservatives of other strands usually reject the accusation of "Structural conservatism".

In the 1970s, the term was used by Social Democratic politicians in Germany, among others by then-chancellor Helmut Schmidt. The Green Party, which stood for ecological preservation, also claimed the term for themselves.

== Contemporary use ==
More recently, the Minister President of Baden-Württemberg, Winfried Kretschmann of the Green Party, used the term of value conservatism in a 2018 book, describing it as a force that could, primarily, preserve the "natural foundations of life", especially by fighting climate change, and that, secondarily, would preserve an open society. He cited Erinnerungskultur, the protection of minorities and European integration as cornerstones of that open society. Value conservatism, according to Kretschmann, thus stands in opposition to social conservatism and the illiberal conservative revolution.

Some factions within the Christian Democratic Union also call themselves value conservative, such as the Einsteinconnection.

== See also ==
- Conservatism in Germany
