= CDU/CSU =

Centre-right political alliance in Germany

- Chairmen: Friedrich Merz (CDU); Markus Söder (CSU)
- Parliamentary leader: Thorsten Frei (CDU/CSU Group)
- Founded: 1949; 77 years ago
- Youth wing: Young Union
- Ideology: Christian democracy; Conservatism (German)
- Political position: Centre-right
- European affiliation: European People's Party
- European Parliament group: European People's Party Group
- International affiliation: International Democracy Union
- Alliance parties: Christian Democratic Union of Germany (CDU); Christian Social Union in Bavaria (CSU)
- Colours: Blue (official) (Note: Since 2021); Black (customary)
- Bundestag: 208 / 630
- State Parliaments: 616 / 1,894
- European Parliament: 29 / 96
- Heads of State Governments: 8 / 16

Website
- www.cducsu.de

CDU/CSU, unofficially the Union parties (German: Unionsparteien [uˈni̯oːnspaʁˌtaɪən]) or the Union, is a centre-right Christian democratic and conservative political alliance of two political parties in Germany: the Christian Democratic Union of Germany (CDU) and the Christian Social Union in Bavaria (CSU).

The CSU contests elections only in Bavaria, while the CDU operates in the other 15 states of Germany. The CSU also reflects the particular concerns of the largely rural, Catholic south. While the two Christian Democratic parties are commonly described as sister parties, they have shared a common parliamentary group, the CDU/CSU Parliamentary Group, in the German Bundestag (German: CDU/CSU-Fraktion im Deutschen Bundestag) since the foundation of the Federal Republic of Germany in 1949. According to German Federal Electoral Law, members of a parliamentary group which share the same basic political aims must not compete with one another in any federal state.

The parties themselves officially remain completely independent with their own leadership and only few issue- or age-based joint organisations, which makes the alliance informal. However, in practice the committees of the parties harmonise their decisions with each other and the two parties run behind a common candidate for Chancellor, and the leader of one party is usually invited to party conventions of the other party.

Both the CDU and CSU are members of the European People's Party and the International Democracy Union. Both parties sit in the European People's Party Group in the European Parliament. The CDU and CSU share a common youth organisation, the Young Union, a common pupil organisation, the Pupil Union of Germany, a common student organisation, the Association of Christian Democratic Students and a common Mittelstand organisation, the Mittelstand and Business association.

== History ==
=== Predecessors ===
Both the CDU and the CSU were established after World War II and share a perspective based on Christian democracy and conservatism and hold the dominant centre-right position in the German political spectrum. The CSU is usually considered the de facto successor of the Weimar Republic–era Bavarian People's Party (BVP), which itself broke away from the all-German Catholic Centre Party (DZP) after World War I, but the CSU included also parts of the agrarian and liberal Bavarian Peasants' League and parts of the Bavarian wing of the German People's Party (DVP). However the CDU's foundation was the result of a major re-organisation of the centre-right political camp compared to the Weimar Republic. Although the CDU was largely built as the de facto successor of the Centre Party, it successfully opened up to non-Catholic Christians (many of them affiliated with the German People's Party until 1933) and successfully asserted itself as the only major conservative party (outside of Bavaria) against initial competition from other Catholic, Protestant or national conservative parties such as the German Party during the early years of the Federal Republic.

The BVP became the sister party of the DZP and they did not compete against each other except for the May 1924 German federal election, the 1924 Bavarian state election and the 1925 German presidential election. The DZP and BVP were mostly jointly represented at the Imperial governments. Similarly to the modern CDU/CSU split, the Bavarian People's Party was generally seen as the party further to the political right, as evidenced by the 1925 second round of the presidential election when the Center Party backed Rhenish Catholic and Weimar Coalition candidate Wilhelm Marx while the BVP made common cause with the monarchist and nationalist parties in backing Prussian junker and former general Paul von Hindenburg despite him being a Protestant and the long-standing mutual animosity between Bavaria and Prussia.

For short periods of time, there existed

- the Christian People's Party of the Saarland as sister party of the CSU during the 1957 West German federal election,
- the German Social Union (DSU) as sister party of the CSU before the 1990 East German general election,
- the East German CDU as sister party of the CDU until the German reunification and
- the Baden Christian-Social People's Party until 1947.

Alliance for Germany was a coalition for the 1990 East German general election consisting of the CDU, the DSU and Democratic Awakening which merged into the CDU.

=== CSU ambitions to become a nationwide party ===
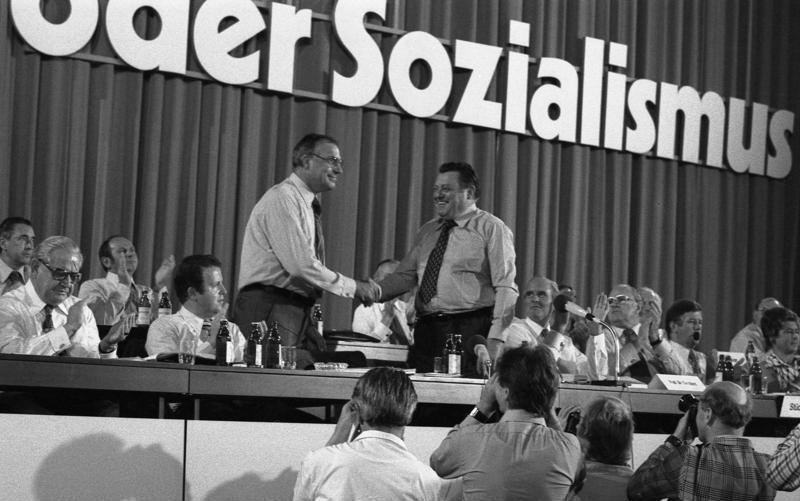
CSU party rally in June 1976. On the right Franz Josef Strauß, the CSU leader since 1961, on the left Helmut Kohl, leader of the federal CDU since 1973 and main candidate for the general elections in October 1976.

During the 1970s and then again after 2015, several CSU leaders have expressed the wish to make the CSU a truly independent party without formal ties to the CDU. Usually they combined this wish with an expansion to the rest of Germany.

After 1969, CDU and CSU were in the opposition in the Bundestag. CDU leader Kohl wanted to win the liberal FDP again for a coalition with the CDU/CSU, while the CSU leader Strauß had different plans. He aimed for a right wing majority without the FDP. Additionally, Strauß thought little of the current CDU leader Kohl, a more moderate Christian Democrat.

Strauß believed that CDU and CSU should be separate national parties to address different audience: the CDU the moderate, social and liberal voters, the CSU the conservative voters. After the elections they should still form a government together.

In 1975, the federal CDU declared Kohl to be the next CDU/CSU chancellor candidate for the 1976 general elections – without consulting the CSU. Kohl did well in the elections on 3 October 1976, although Social Democrats and FDP had still enough seats to continue their coalition. Kohl decided to leave his post as prime minister of the state of Rhineland-Palatinate for the chairmanship of the CDU/CSU Bundestag faction.

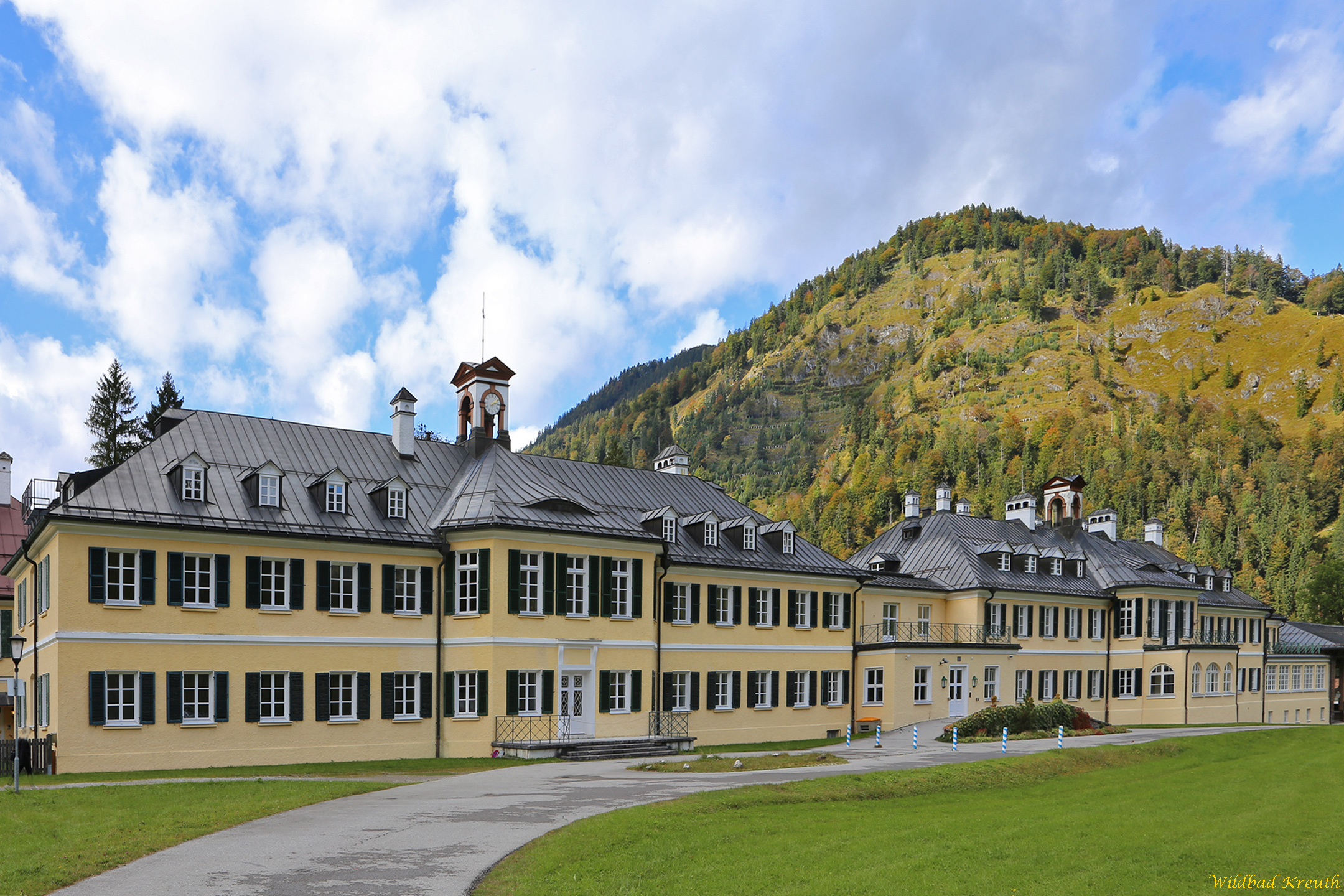
The Hans-Seidel-Stiftung is a political foundation linked to the CSU. From 1975 to 2016, it had an educational centre in this building in the municipality of Kreuth, close to the Austrian border. For decades, spirit of Kreuth was a reference to an independent, conservative CSU.

In November that year, the 49 CSU Bundestag members gathered in the party's educational centre in Wildbad Kreuth, Southern Bavaria. 30 of them voted for a proposal to form a CSU Bundestag parliamentary group of its own. CDU leader Kohl was informed only later via the media. This 'Kreuth separation decision' (Kreuther Trennungsbeschluss) was a major political earthquake and caused the CDU to react swiftly and resolutely. Kohl threatened the CSU by preparing the creation of a CDU party organization in Bavaria. In March 1977, the CDU Bayern was supposed to be founded in Nuremberg.

During the conflict, the Aktionsgemeinschaft Vierte Partei, the Bund Freies Deutschland (West-Berlin), the Christlich Soziale Wähler Union (Saarland), the Vierte Partei Deutschlands – Union für Umwelt und Lebensschutz (Lower Saxony), the Deutsche Union (North Rhine-Westphalia) and the Partei Freier Bürger (Bremen) were founded. On 12 December 1976, the vote was rescinded after the CDU had threatened in turn to form local associations within Bavaria and to run in Bavarian elections against the CSU.

Strauß himself polemicised against Kohl in a closed CSU meeting on 24 November (this Wienerwald speech was leaked, and published on 29 November in Der Spiegel):

That Helmut Kohl will never become chancellor. Being 90 he will write his memoirs: 'I was chancellor candidate for 40 years; lessons and experiences from bitter times.' The last chapter written maybe in Siberia or elsewhere.

— Franz Josef Strauß

It turned out that most local CSU leaders and also conservative CDU state leaders did not approve a separation between CSU and CDU. The CSU Bundestag members revoked their decision. On 7 December, the CDU/CSU Bundestag group elected Kohl as its chairman. In 1980, Strauß was the joint CDU/CSU chancellor candidate and lost more than 4 percent of the votes. This ended his ambitions for a federal CSU.

=== Tensions in 2016–2021 ===
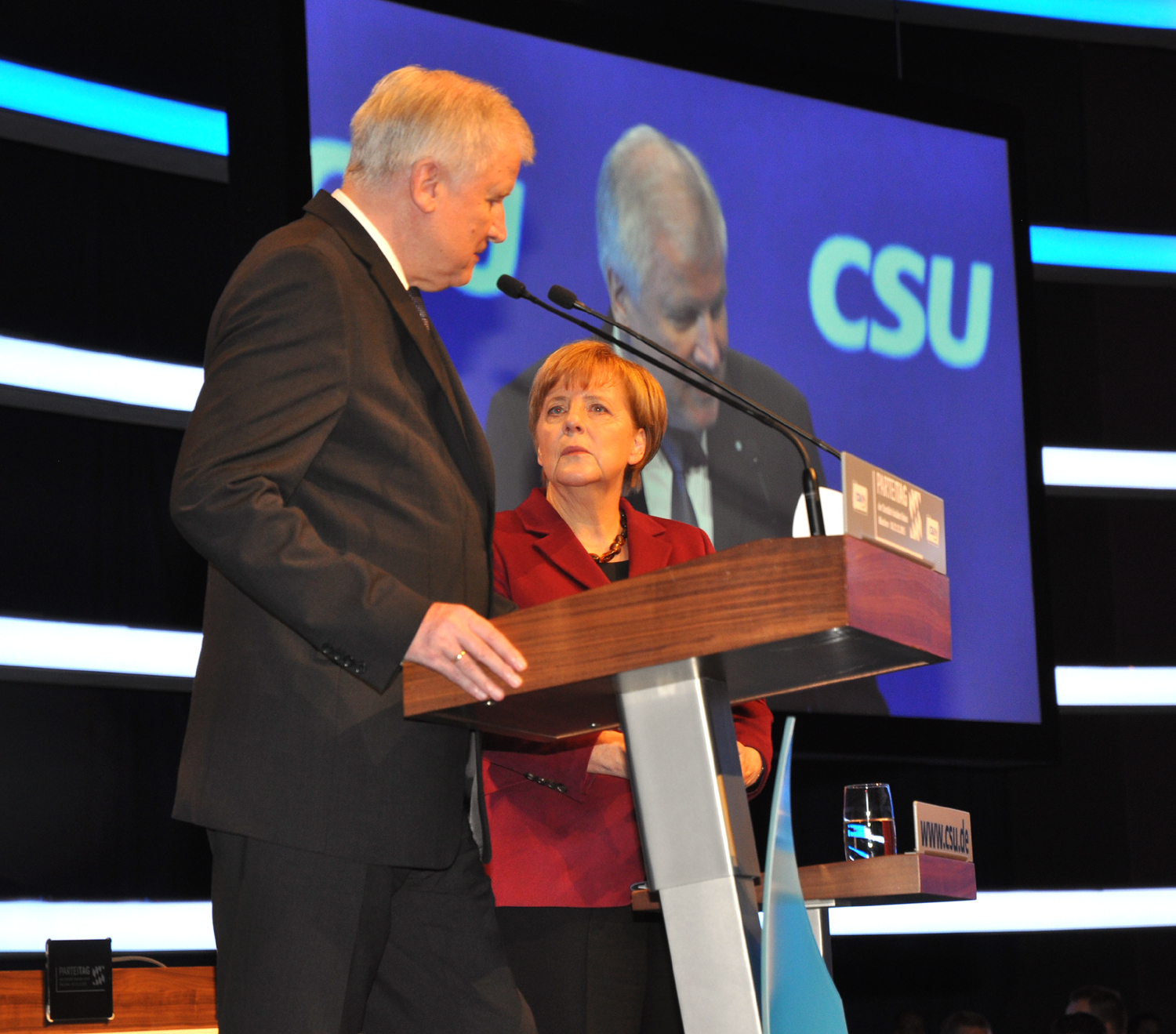
The Munich scandal of November 2015: Horst Seehofer, CSU leader and Bavarian minister-president, with CDU leader and chancellor Angela Merkel, at the 2015 CSU party rally. At this occasion, Seehofer humiliated his guest by letting her stand next to him for minutes while he lamented her liberal politics with regard to refugees.

Under the chairmanship of Angela Merkel (2000–2018), the CDU abandoned some right wing positions and shifted more to the political centre. Especially the 2015 refugee crisis divided the German population and caused conflict between the CDU and the CSU.

Therefore, a federal CSU was discussed again among party members and journalists. For example, conservative Welt columnist Ansgar Graw wrote in 2016 that CDU and CSU lost its stance as a law and order party. As Merkel's CDU could not move to the right without losing credibility, Graw called the CSU to become a federal party, a right wing party that rigorously deports asylum seekers without right to stay. On the contrary, former CSU leader Theo Waigel warned against a separate election campaign, claiming that if this happened, the CDU and CSU would fight each other much more than the rest of the parties.

In 2018, Interior Minister Horst Seehofer, a former Minister-President of Bavaria and the leader of the CSU, opposed CDU Chancellor Angela Merkel's policy on Syrian refugees in Germany. Seehofer hoped to place restrictions on incoming refugees, many of whom enter the country through Bavaria. His stance was seen as being in part motivated by the 2018 Bavarian state election in which it was feared that the far-right Alternative for Germany would make gains. The dispute threatened to bring down the Merkel government which relied on the CSU for its parliamentary majority as Seehofer had indicated his resignation on 2 July, but he already rescinded it a day later after an agreement over the issue between the coalition parties (the CDU, the CSU and the SPD) had been reached.

In June 2018, CDU and CSU Bundestag members held separate meetings on the topic of refugees, which was highly unusual. A fake Twitter account announced that CSU leader Seehofer had abolished the CDU/CSU alliance and that CDU vice chair Bouffier had called for a CDU in Bavaria. Many journalists published the news, which was interpreted by the Münchner Merkur as a sign that such events are considered no longer absurd or unlikely. Political scientist Heinrich Oberreuter did not believe in Seehofer's threat to expand the CSU to the rest of Germany. Both parties aim essentially for the same voters. As separate parties in the general elections both would lose voters. The CSU would lose its unique selling point as a Bavarian party. With a CDU in Bavaria, the CSU would fall from 47 to 30 percent in Bavaria.

A federal CSU was again discussed prior to the general elections of 2021. CSU leader Markus Söder was unhappy about the CDU decision to declare CDU leader Armin Laschet the chancellor candidate and successor of Angela Merkel. In September 2020, the CSU created online memberships for people not living in Bavaria. A survey in May 2021 foresaw that a federal CSU may win at least 9 percent of the votes, especially in Eastern Germany and among FDP voters.

Both parties suffered heavy losses in elections after 2017. In the Bavarian state elections of October 2018, the CSU lost 10.5 percent. With 37.2 percent, this was its worst election result since 1950. In the federal elections of 2021, the CDU lost 7.9 percent and the CSU 1.0 percent of the (party list) votes.

=== 2025 comeback ===
CDU/CSU support in the 2025 German federal election

Following the federal election which was held on February 23, 2025, the CDU was projected to capture the most seats in the German parliament, with the CDU leader Friedrich Merz serving as the German chancellor.

== Political stances ==
The CDU and the CSU usually only differ slightly in their political stances. The CSU is usually considered more socially conservative (especially on family issues, e.g. the CSU favors providing infants' parents with compensation (Betreuungsgeld) if they intend not to use the public day nursery system to work while the CDU favors public funding of day nurseries). The CSU government in Bavaria has implemented one of the strictest regulations for shopping hours in Germany in order to protect employees. The CSU also strongly opposed ideas of an income unrelated system of contributions to public health insurances, a proposal which met a lot of approval in the CDU in 2010.

CSU politicians often make their mark as self-declared defenders of Bavaria's state rights and cultural independence from federal or European Union bureaucrats, even in times of conservative federal governments or conservative presidents of the European Commission. In 1998, then-Chancellor Helmut Kohl of the CDU had to pressure the CSU intensely not to veto the introduction of the euro as the new currency in Germany. On the other hand, the name euro was the idea of former CSU chairman Theo Waigel, who served as finance minister when the euro was introduced and held a very pro-European position in contrast to the Bavarian government of Edmund Stoiber. Since 2016, the CSU has strongly been advocating the idea of a maximum number (Obergrenze) of 200,000 people per year to limit the number of asylum seekers. This is opposed by the CDU because they claim that it is impossible to limit the number through border control.

While both parties officially identify themselves as non-denominational Christian, the Catholic influence on the CSU is stronger than that on the CDU since Bavaria is predominantly Catholic while Christians in Germany as a whole are approximately equally balanced between Catholics and Protestants. There are nevertheless strong regional differences within Bavaria and Germany as a whole with large predominantly Protestant areas in northern Bavaria and large predominantly Catholic areas in North Rhine-Westphalia and South Western Germany having a strong effect on CDU state politicians. Saarland's former CDU Minister-President Annegret Kramp-Karrenbauer heavily opposed same-sex marriages in July 2017 while the CDU in Schleswig-Holstein was in favor, with Saarland having the largest share of Catholic Christians in any German state.

== Forms of cooperation ==
CDU and CSU are two separate parties with separate organization. While the CDU is a federal party with members and local affiliations in 15 of the 16 German states, the CSU has members and affiliations only in Bavaria. (CSU online members live outside of Bavaria but have no vote within the party.) Also, the CDU runs only in regional and local elections outside of Bavaria. Both parties do have party lists for the general (federal) elections to the Bundestag: the CDU has 15 lists in each of the 15 non-Bavarian states, the CSU only in Bavaria.

Since 1972, both parties agreed a joint election manifesto for the federal elections. Sometimes the CSU additionally published a manifesto of its own. Both parties always gather behind a joint candidate for the chancellorship. There is no approved procedure to select this candidate, creating tensions between both parties from time to time. During the federal campaign, the CSU may decide to present mainly Bavarian candidates on the election posters and not the CDU joint chancellor candidate, and the popular candidates of the CDU may decide not to show up in the Bavarian campaign.

Both parties together form a parliamentary group (Fraktion) in the Bundestag. Such a Fraktionsgemeinschaft is legal because both parties do not compete with each other during elections (the voters can nowhere decide between a CDU and a CSU candidate). The Fraktionsgemeinschaft (parliamentary group alliance) works on the basis of a Fraktionsvertrag (parliamentary group agreement) with some special provisions for the CSU, e.g. with regard to speaking time in the Bundestag.

The parliamentary group has one chair and several vice chairs (12 in the 2021 Bundestag). The chair has always been a CDU member. The First Deputy chair is ex officio the leader of the CSU-Landesgruppe. The Fraktion is divided into 16 Landesgruppen (state groups), comprising the Fraktion members per state. The CSU-Landesgruppenchef is considered one of the most prolific members of the Bundestag parliamentary group. Historically, most of these politicians have become members of the federal government.

CDU and CSU always take part in coalition negotiations together, although they behave like two different parties. Both parties join a federal government coalition together; there has never been only one of them in government. At least one major government department is 'given' to the CSU. In the past, the CSU often lead the departments for postal services (when this ministry still existed), transportation, constructions, or agriculture.

In European elections, CDU and CSU have separate party lists. In the European Parliament, they form a group within the parliamentary group of the European People's Party.

== Leaders of the Group in the Bundestag ==
- Konrad Adenauer (1949)
- Heinrich von Brentano (1949–1955; 1961–1964)
- Heinrich Krone (1955–1961)
- Rainer Barzel (1964–1973)
- Karl Carstens (1973–1976)
- Helmut Kohl (1976–1982)
- Alfred Dregger (1982–1991)
- Wolfgang Schäuble (1991–2000)
- Friedrich Merz (2000–2002)
- Angela Merkel (2002–2005)
- Volker Kauder (2005–2018)
- Ralph Brinkhaus (2018–2022)
- Friedrich Merz (2022–2025)
- Jens Spahn (2025-2026)
- Thorsten Frei (2026-current)

== Electoral history ==
=== Results timeline ===
Year	(Germany) DE	(European Union) EU	(Baden-Württemberg) BW			(Bavaria) BY	(Berlin) BE	(Brandenburg) BB	(Bremen (state)) HB	(Hamburg) HH	(Hesse) HE	(Lower Saxony) NI	(Mecklenburg-Vorpommern) MV	(North Rhine-Westphalia) NW	(Rhineland-Palatinate) RP	(Saarland) SL	(Saxony) SN	(Saxony-Anhalt) ST	(Schleswig-Holstein) SH	(Thuringia) TH
Year	(Germany) DE	(European Union) EU	(Grand Duchy of Baden) SB	WB	(Württemberg-Hohenzollern) WH	(Bavaria) BY	(Berlin) BE	(Brandenburg) BB	(Bremen (state)) HB	(Hamburg) HH	(Hesse) HE	(Lower Saxony) NI	(Mecklenburg-Vorpommern) MV	(North Rhine-Westphalia) NW	(Rhineland-Palatinate) RP	(Saarland) SL	(Saxony) SN	(Saxony-Anhalt) ST	(Schleswig-Holstein) SH	(Thuringia) TH
1946	TBF	TBF	TBF	**38,4**	TBF	58,3	22,2	DDR	18,9	26,7	37,3	TBF	DDR	TBF	TBF		DDR		TBF	DDR
1946	TBF	TBF	TBF	**38,4**	TBF	▼52,3		DDR	18,9	26,7	▼31,0	TBF	DDR	TBF	TBF		DDR		TBF	DDR
1947	TBF	TBF	**55,9**		**54,2**			DDR	▲22,0	26,7		19,9	DDR	37.6	47,2		DDR		34,0	DDR
1948	TBF	TBF					▼19,4	DDR		26,7			DDR				DDR			DDR
1949	31.0	TBF						DDR		▼26,7			DDR				DDR			DDR
1950		TBF		▼26,3		▼27,4	▲24,7	DDR			▼18.8		DDR	▼36.9			DDR		▼19,8	DDR
1951		TBF						DDR	▼9,0			▼23,7	DDR		▼39,2		DDR			DDR
1952		TBF	36,0					DDR					DDR				DDR			DDR
1953	▲45.2	TBF						DDR		**▲50,0**			DDR				DDR			DDR
1954		TBF				▲38,0	▲30,4	DDR			▲24.1		DDR	▲41.3			DDR		▲32,2	DDR
1955		TBF						DDR	▲18,0			▲26,6	DDR		▲46,8	▲25,4	DDR			DDR
1956		TBF	▲42,6					DDR					DDR				DDR			DDR
1957	**▲50.2**	TBF						DDR		▼32,2			DDR				DDR			DDR
1958		TBF				▲45,6	▲37,7	DDR			▲32.0		DDR	**▲50.5**			DDR		▲44,4	DDR
1959		TBF						DDR	▼14,8			▲30,8	DDR		▲48,4		DDR			DDR
1960		TBF	▼39,5					DDR					DDR			▼36,6	DDR			DDR
1961	▼45.3	TBF						DDR		▼29,1			DDR				DDR			DDR
1962		TBF				▲47,5		DDR			▼28.8		DDR	▼46.4			DDR		▲45,0	DDR
1963		TBF					▼28,8	DDR	▲28,9			▲37,7	DDR		▼44,4		DDR			DDR
1964		TBF	▲46.18					DDR					DDR				DDR			DDR
1965	▲47.6	TBF						DDR					DDR			▲42,7	DDR			DDR
1966		TBF				▲48,1		DDR		▲30,0	▼26.4		DDR	▼42.8			DDR			DDR
1967		TBF					▲32,9	DDR	▲29,5			▲41,7	DDR		▲46,7		DDR		▲42,7	DDR
1968		TBF	▼44.23					DDR					DDR				DDR			DDR
1969	▼46.1	TBF						DDR					DDR				DDR			DDR
1970		TBF				▲56,4		DDR		▲32,8	▲39.7	▲45,7	DDR	▲46.3		▲47,8	DDR			DDR
1971		TBF					▲38,2	DDR	▲31,6				DDR		▲50,0		DDR		**▲51,9**	DDR
1972	▼44.9	TBF	▲52.92					DDR					DDR				DDR			DDR
1973		TBF						DDR					DDR				DDR			DDR
1974		TBF				**▲62,1**		DDR		▲40,6	▲47.3	▲48,8	DDR				DDR			DDR
1975		TBF					▲43,9	DDR	▲33,8				DDR	▲47.1	**▲53,9**	**▲49,1**	DDR		▼50,4	DDR
1976	▲48.6	TBF	**▲56.72**					DDR					DDR				DDR			DDR
1977		TBF						DDR					DDR				DDR			DDR
1978		TBF				▼59,1		DDR		▼37,6	▼46.0	▼48,7	DDR				DDR			DDR
1979		**49.2**					▼44,4	DDR	▼31,9				DDR		▼50,1		DDR		▼48,3	DDR
1980	▼44.5		▼53.35					DDR					DDR	▼43.2		▼44,0	DDR			DDR
1981							**▲48,0**	DDR					DDR				DDR			DDR
1982						▼58,3		DDR		▲43,2	▼45.6	**▲50,7**	DDR				DDR			DDR
1983	▲48.8							DDR	▲33,3	▼38,6	▼39.4		DDR		▲51,9		DDR		▲49,0	DDR
1984		▼46.0	▼51.87					DDR					DDR				DDR			DDR
1985							▼46.4	DDR					DDR	▼36.5		▼37,3	DDR			DDR
1986						▼55.8		DDR		▲41,9		▼44.3	DDR				DDR			DDR
1987	▼44.3							DDR	▼23.4	▼40,5	▲42.1		DDR		▼45,1		DDR		▼42.6	DDR
1988			▼49.05					DDR					DDR				DDR		▼33.3	DDR
1989		▼37.7					▼37.7	DDR					DDR				DDR			DDR
1990	▼43.8					▼54.9	▲40.4	**29.4**				▼42.0	**38.3**	▲36.7		▼33.4	53.8	**39.0**		45.4
1991									▲30.7	▼35.1	▼40.2				▼38.7					
1992			▼39.6																▲33.8	
1993										▼25.1										
1994	▼41.4	▲38.8				▼52.8		▼18.7				▼36.4	▼37.7			▲38.6	**▲58.1**	▼34.4		▼42.6
1995							▼37.4		▲32.6		▼39.2			▲37.7						
1996			▲41.3												38.7				▲37.2	
1997										▲30.7										
1998	▼35.1					▲52.9						▼35.9	▼30.2					▼22.0		
1999		▲48.7					▲40.8	▲26.5	**▲37.1**		▲43.4					▲45.5	▼56.9			**▲51.0**
2000														▼37.0					▼35.2	
2001			▲44.8				▼23.8			▼26.2					▼35.3					
2002	▲38.5												▲31.4					▲37.3		
2003						▲60.7			▼29.8		**▲48.8**	▲48.3								
2004		▼44.5						▼19.4		▲47.2						▲47.5	▼41.1			▼43.0
2005	▼35.2													▲44.8					▲40.2	
2006			▼44.2				▼21.3						▼30.2		▼32.8			▼36.2		
2007									▼25.6											
2008						▼43,4				▼42.6	▼36.8	▼42.5								
2009	▼33.8	▼37.9						▲19.8			▲37.2					▼34.5	▼40.2		▼31.5	▼31.2
2010														▼34.6						
2011			▼39.0				▲23.3		▼20.4	▼21.9			▼23.0		▲35.2			▼32.5		
2012														▼26.3		▲35.2			▼30.8	
2013	▲41.5					▲47.7					▲38.3	▼36.0								
2014		▼35.4						▲23.0									▼39.4			▲33.5
2015									▲22.4	▼15.9										
2016			▲30.3				▼17.6						▼19.0		▼31.8			▼29.8		
2017	▼32.9											▼33.6		▲33.0		▲40.7			▲32.0	
2018						▼37.2					▼27.0									
2019		▼28.9						▼15.6	▲26.7								▼32.1			▼21.7
2020										▼11.2										
2021	▼24.1		▼24.1				▲18.0						▼13.3		▼27.7			▲37.1		
2022												▼28.1		▲35.7		▼28.5			▲43.4	
2023						▼37.0	▲28.2		▼26.2		▲34.6									
2024		▲30.0						▼12.1									▼31.9			▲23.6
2025	▲28.5									▲19.8										
2026			▲29.7				▼18,8			▲19.8			▼4,9		▲31.0			▼17.2		
Year	(Germany) DE	(European Union) EU	(Baden-Württemberg) BW			(Bavaria) BY	(Berlin) BE	(Brandenburg) BB	(Bremen (state)) HB	(Hamburg) HH	(Hesse) HE	(Lower Saxony) NI	(Mecklenburg-Vorpommern) MV	(North Rhine-Westphalia) NW	(Rhineland-Palatinate) RP	(Saarland) SL	(Saxony) SN	(Saxony-Anhalt) ST	(Schleswig-Holstein) SH	(Thuringia) TH
**As CDU/CSU**; Present in legislature (in opposition); Junior coalition partner Senior coalition partner / Head of the EC								**As CDU** (every state except Bavaria); Present in legislature (in opposition); Junior coalition partner Senior coalition partner						**As CSU** (Only in Bavaria); Present in legislature (in opposition); Junior coalition partner Senior coalition partner						
**Bold** indicates best result to date.

=== Federal Parliament (Bundestag) ===
Election	Candidate	Constituency		Party list		Seats	+/–	Status
Election	Candidate	Votes	%	Votes	%	Seats	+/–	Status
1949	Konrad Adenauer			7,359,084	31.0	139 / 402		CDU/CSU–FDP–DP
1953	Konrad Adenauer	12,027,945	43.7	12,443,981	45.2	249 / 509	▲110	CDU/CSU–FDP–DP
1957	Konrad Adenauer	15,161,550	**50.3**	15,008,399	**50.2**	277 / 519	▲28	CDU/CSU–DP (1957–1960)
1957	Konrad Adenauer	15,161,550	**50.3**	15,008,399	**50.2**	277 / 519	▲28	CDU/CSU (1960–1961)
1961	Konrad Adenauer	14,727,737	46.0	14,298,372	45.3	251 / 521	▼26	CDU/CSU–FDP
1965	Ludwig Erhard	15,835,967	48.8	15,524,068	47.6	251 / 518	Steady	CDU/CSU–FDP (1965–1966)
1965	Ludwig Erhard	15,835,967	48.8	15,524,068	47.6	251 / 518	Steady	CDU/CSU–SPD (1966–1969)
1969	Kurt Georg Kiesinger	15,231,324	46.6	15,195,187	46.1	250 / 518	▼1	Opposition
1972	Rainer Barzel	16,925,438	45.4	16,806,020	44.9	234 / 518	▼16	Opposition
1976	Helmut Kohl	18,431,671	48.9	18,394,801	48.6	254 / 518	▲20	Opposition
1980	Franz Josef Strauss	17,408,572	46.0	16,897,659	44.5	237 / 519	▼17	Opposition (1980–82)
1980	Franz Josef Strauss	17,408,572	46.0	16,897,659	44.5	237 / 519	▼17	CDU/CSU–FDP (1982–83)
1983	Helmut Kohl	20,262,260	52.2	18,998,545	48.8	255 / 520	▲18	CDU/CSU–FDP
1987	Helmut Kohl	18,027,771	47.8	16,761,572	44.3	234 / 519	▼21	CDU/CSU–FDP
1990	Helmut Kohl	**21,131,478**	45.7	**20,358,096**	43.8	319 / 662	▲85	CDU/CSU–FDP
1994	Helmut Kohl	21,130,952	45.1	19,517,156	41.4	294 / 672	▼25	CDU/CSU–FDP
1998	Helmut Kohl	19,456,687	39.6	17,329,388	35.1	245 / 669	▼49	Opposition
2002	Edmund Stoiber	19,647,690	41.1	18,482,641	38.5	248 / 603	▲3	Opposition
2005	Angela Merkel	19,280,940	40.8	16,631,049	35.2	226 / 614	▼22	CDU/CSU–SPD
2009	Angela Merkel	17,047,674	39.2	14,658,515	33.8	239 / 622	▲13	CDU/CSU–FDP
2013	Angela Merkel	19,777,721	45.3	18,165,446	41.5	311 / 631	▲72	CDU/CSU–SPD
2017	Angela Merkel	17,286,238	37.3	15,317,344	32.9	246 / 709	▼65	CDU/CSU–SPD
2021	Armin Laschet	13,233,968	28.6	11,177,746	24.1	197 / 735	▼50	Opposition
2025	Friedrich Merz	15,876,248	32.1	14,160,402	28.5	208 / 630	▲11	CDU/CSU–SPD

=== European Parliament ===
Election	Votes	%	Seats	+/–	EP Group
1979	13,700,205	49.2	40 / 78		EPP
1984	11,417,541	46.0	39 / 78	▼1	EPP
1989	10,659,123	37.7	31 / 78	▼8	EPP
1994	13,739,447	38.8	47 / 99	▲15	EPP
1999	13,168,231	48.7	53 / 99	▲6	EPP-ED
2004	11,476,897	44.5	49 / 99	▼4	EPP-ED
2009	9,968,153	37.9	42 / 99	▼7	EPP
2014	10,374,758	35.4	34 / 96	▼8	EPP
2019	10,791,910	28.9	29 / 96	▼5	EPP
2024	11,944,867	30.0	29 / 96	Steady	EPP

== See also ==
- Austrian People's Party
- Politics of Germany
- Protestantism in Germany
- Religion in Germany
- Roman Catholicism in Germany
