= 1979 European Parliament election in West Germany =

- 10 June 1979

All 81 German seats in the European Parliament
- Turnout: 65.7%
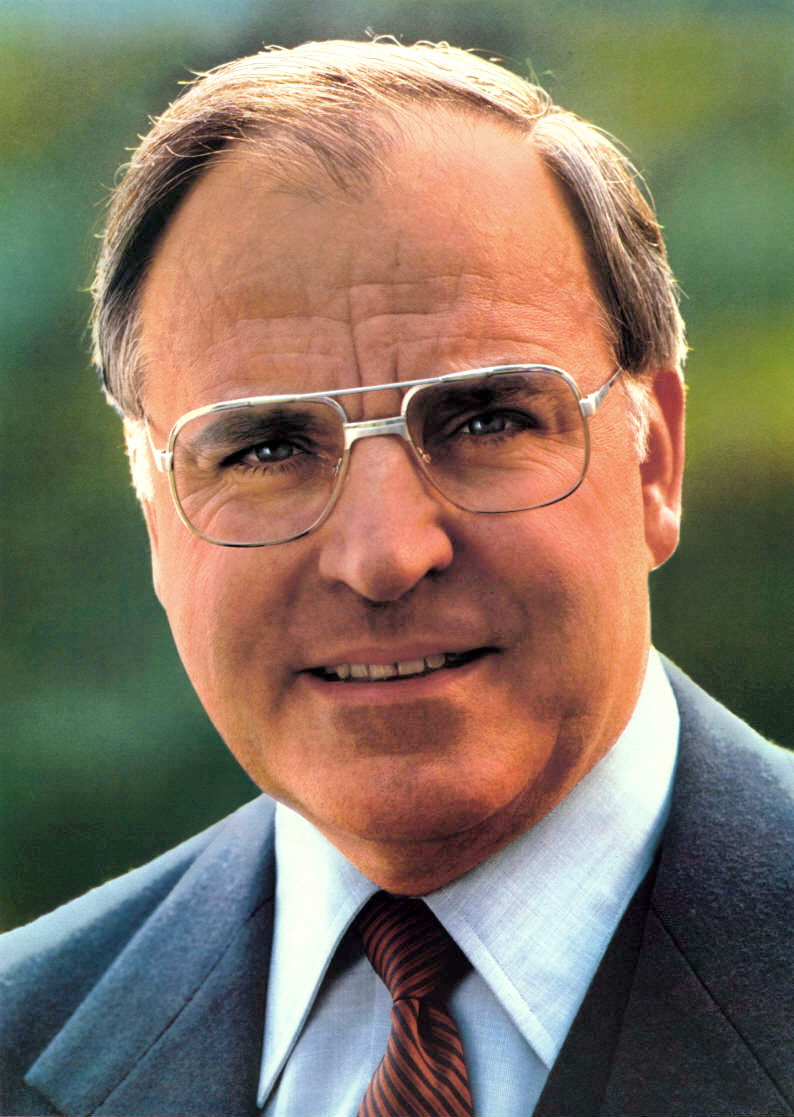

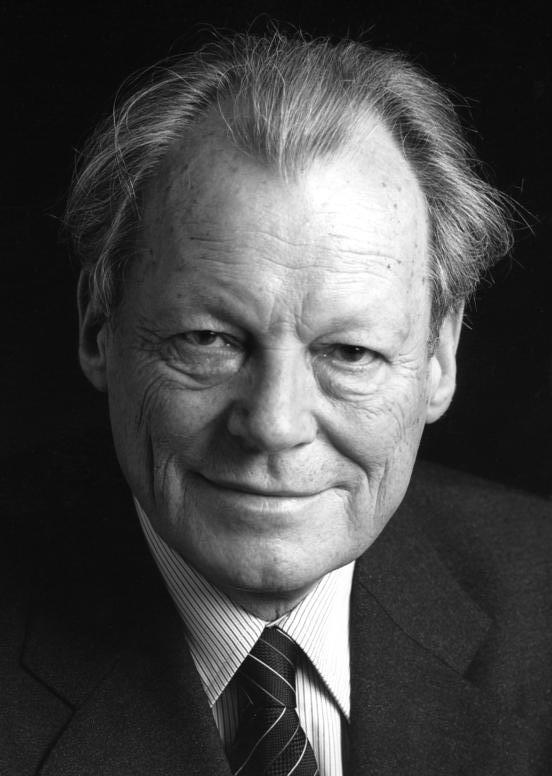

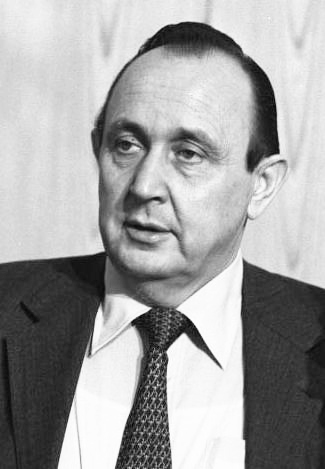
	First party	Second party	Third party
Leader	Helmut Kohl	Willy Brandt	Hans-Dietrich Genscher
Party	CDU/CSU	SPD	FDP
Alliance	EPP	SOC	LD
Seats won	42	35	4
Popular vote	13,700,205	11,370,045	1,662,621
Percentage	49.2%	40.8%	6.0%

An election of the delegation from West Germany to the first directly elected European Parliament was held in 1979.

The CDU/CSU won a plurality of the German seats in the European Parliament, which they retained in every subsequent election as of 2022.

== Results ==
Party or alliance		Votes	%	Seats
SOC	Social Democratic Party	11,370,045	40.83	34
EPP	Christian Democratic Union	10,883,085	39.08	32
EPP	Christian Social Union	2,817,120	10.12	8
LD	Free Democratic Party	1,662,621	5.97	4
NI	The Greens	893,683	3.21	0
NI	German Communist Party	112,055	0.40	0
NI	Christian Bavarian People's Party	45,311	0.16	0
NI	European Workers' Party	31,822	0.11	0
NI	Centre Party	31,367	0.11	0
Total		27,847,109	100.00	78
Valid votes		27,847,109	99.10	
Invalid/blank votes		251,763	0.90	
Total votes		28,098,872	100.00	
Registered voters/turnout		42,751,940	65.73	
Source: Federal Statistics Office

West Berlin, due to its special status, was ineligible to participate in the election. Instead, the city legislature indirectly elected three members:

Party or alliance		Seats
EPP	Christian Democratic Union	2
SOC	Social Democratic Party	1
Total		3
Source: Wahlen-in-Deutschland.de
