= Schirmann =

Schirmann is a German surname. Notable people with the surname include:

- Daria Schirman (1874–?), Russian physician and embryologist
- Hayyim Schirmann (1904–1981), Jewish scholar
- Richard Schirrmann (1874–1961), German teacher and hostel pioneer

== See also ==
- Schiemann
- Schirman
- Schürmann
