= Hoimar von Ditfurth =

German physician and journalist (1921–1989)

- Born: 15 October 1921; Berlin, Germany
- Died: 1 November 1989 (aged 68); Freiburg im Breisgau, Baden-Württemberg, Germany
- Occupations: Physician and scientific journalist
- Spouse: Heilwig von Raven (m. 1949)
- Children: 4; including Jutta and Wolf-Christian

Hoimar von Ditfurth (15 October 1921 – 1 November 1989) was a German physician and scientific journalist. He was the father of Christian von Ditfurth, a historian, and Jutta Ditfurth, a writer and journalist.

Ditfurth won many awards during his long career, including the Adolf Grimme Awards in 1968, the Bambi Prize in 1972, and the Kalinga Prize in 1978.

== Biography ==
Hoimar Gerhard Friedrich Ernst von Ditfurth was a German physician, academic, and scientific journalist, best known as a television presenter and as a writer of popular books on science.

Ditfurth was born in Berlin on 15 October 1921, into the family of the classical philologist Hans-Otto von Ditfurth, a national conservative Prussian cavalry captain. In 1939 he gained his school-leaving Abitur at the Viktoria-Gymnasium in Potsdam (today the Helmholtz-Gymnasium), then studied medical science, psychology, and philosophy at the universities of Berlin and Hamburg, receiving his doctoral degree in 1946.

From 1948 to 1960 Ditfurth worked at the university hospital of Würzburg, rising to the position of an assistant medical director. In 1959 he was habilitated at the University of Würzburg and became a private lecturer in psychiatry and neurology. In 1967 he was promoted to associate professor in the medical faculty at the same university, and from 1968 held the same position at the University of Heidelberg.

1960 Ditfurth took a job in the pharmaceutical company C.F. Boehringer of Mannheim, where he was the leader of the so-called “Psycho Lab”, being responsible for the development and clinical testing of psychotropic drugs (Chlorpromazine). From 1964 until 1971 he was editor of the journal N+M (“Naturwissenschaft und Medizin”). From 1972, the publication was renamed Mannheimer Forum and was published by Ditfurth until his death. In 1969 he refused the position of manager, commenting "I don't want to sacrifice my intellectual independence", and instead began a new career as a freelance lecturer, publisher, and scientific journalist.

Hoimar von Ditfurth was successful as an author of popular science books and as a television presenter on the WDR, SFB, SR, and ZDF networks. where he tried to bridge the gap between natural sciences and humanities. One focus of his work was to fight against pseudoscience, creationism, and anthropocentrism.

In 1949 Hoimar von Ditfurth married Heilwig von Raven. Together they had four children: Jutta (born 1951), Wolf-Christian (born 1953), Donata-Friederike (born 1956) and York-Alexander (born 1957). In 1971 he became well-known to a wider audience by making the ZDF series “Querschnitt” (later “Querschnitte”) together with Volker Arzt. In the late 1970s he increasingly turned his hand to ecological subjects and became a critic of the western world's belief in progress and economical growth. At the beginning of the 1980s he supported "Alliance '90/The Greens" in its election campaign.

Ditfurth was a member of the German PEN-Zentrum. In his book The Origins of Life: Evolution as Creation (1982), he wrote that science and theology are compatible and argued that evolution is a process brought into being through a divine agency and that creation was not a single event but is instead the long-term process of evolution. The book opposed religious creationism and was described as similar to the theistic evolutionism of Asa Gray.

His daughter Jutta Ditfurth became a politician, while his son Christian von Ditfurth became important as a historian, journalist and writer.

On 1 November 1989 Ditfurth died of thyroid cancer in Freiburg im Breisgau and was buried in Staufen.

== Books ==
- "Die endogene Depression", 1960
- "Kinder des Weltalls", 1970 ("Children of the Universe")
- "Im Anfang war der Wasserstoff", 1972
- "Zusammenhänge", 1974
- "Dimensionen des Lebens", 1974 (together with Volker Arzt)
- "Der Geist fiel nicht vom Himmel", 1976
- "Die Großen – Leben und Leistung der sechshundert bedeutendsten Persönlichkeiten unserer Welt", herausgegeben von Kurt Fassmann unter Mitwirkung von Max Bill, Hoimar von Ditfurth u.a., Kindler Verlag, Zürich 1977
- "Querschnitt – Dimensionen des Lebens II", 1978 (together with Volker Arzt)
- "Wir sind nicht nur von dieser Welt", 1981 ("The Origins of Life-Evolution as Creation")
- "So laßt uns denn ein Apfelbäumchen pflanzen", 1985
- "Unbegreifliche Realität", 1987
- "Innenansichten eines Artgenossen", 1989
- "Das Gespräch", 1992 (Interviewer: Dieter Zilligen), ISBN 3-423-30329-8
- "Das Erbe des Neandertalers", 1992 (posthumous)
- "Die Sterne leuchten, auch wenn wir sie nicht sehen", 1994 (posthumous)
- "Die Wirklichkeit des Homo sapiens", 1995 (posthumous)
- Die Frau an seiner Seite – Gespräche mit Frauen berühmter Männer, hrsg. v. Helga Märthesheimer. Lübbe Verlag, Bergisch-Gladbach 1988. ISBN 3-404-60195-5 (Gespräch von Carola Benninghoven mit Heilwig von Ditfurth. S. 31-55)
- Der Gottheit lebendiges Kleid – Evolutionstheorie und Glaube. Franz Kreuzer im Gespräch mit Hoimar von Ditfurth, Kardinal Franz König und Arnold Keyserling. Deuticke Verlag 1982. ISBN 3-7005-4463-4
- Eckart Löhr: Hoimar von Ditfurth – Aspekte seines Denkens. Eine kritische Einführung in das Denken des Mediziners, Wissenschaftlers und Wissenschaftsjournalisten anlässlich seines 20. Todesjahres. Grin Verlag 2009. ISBN 3-640-26707-9
