= Würzburg =

City in Bavaria, Germany

Würzburg Wörtzburch (Mainfränkisch)
- City
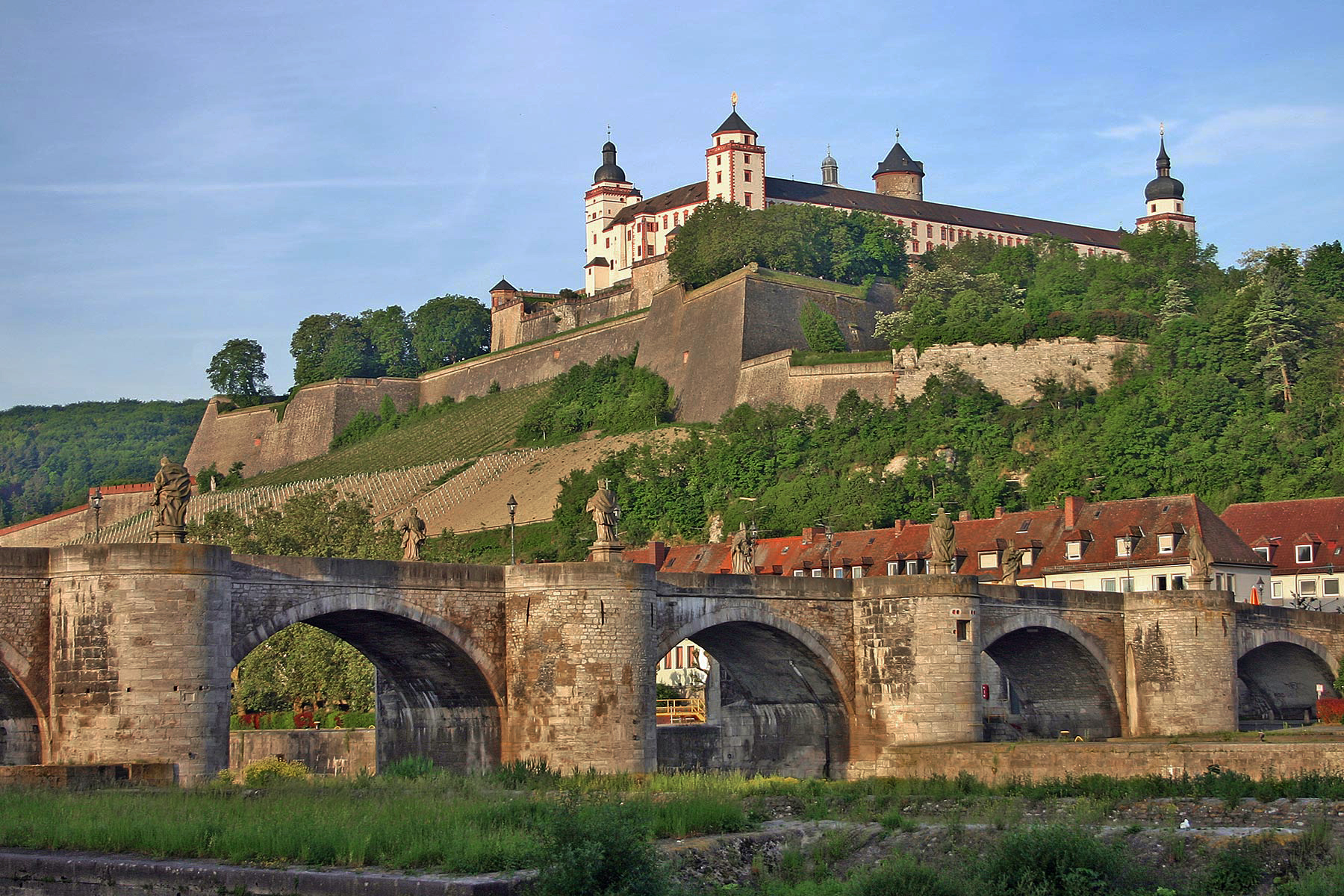
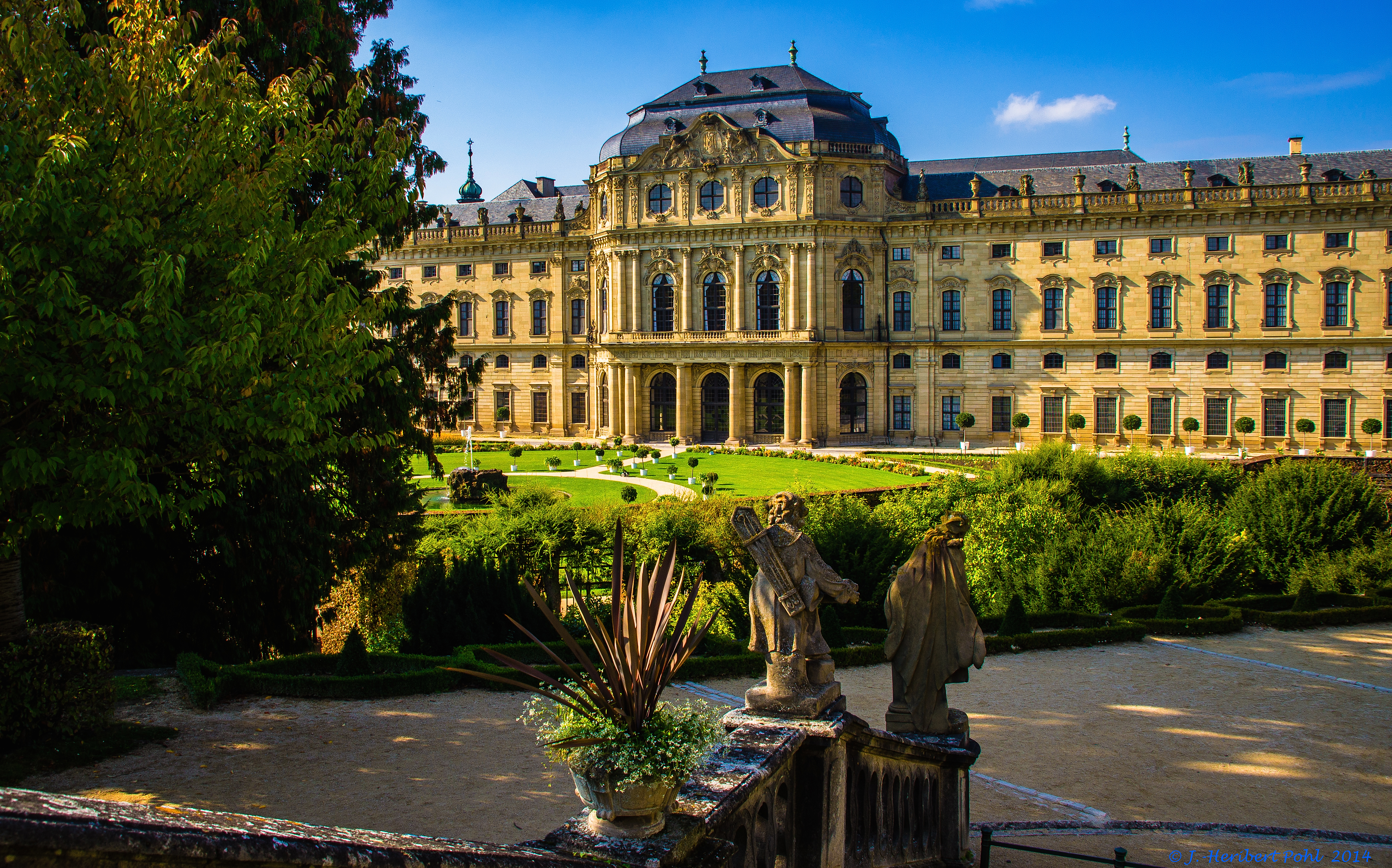
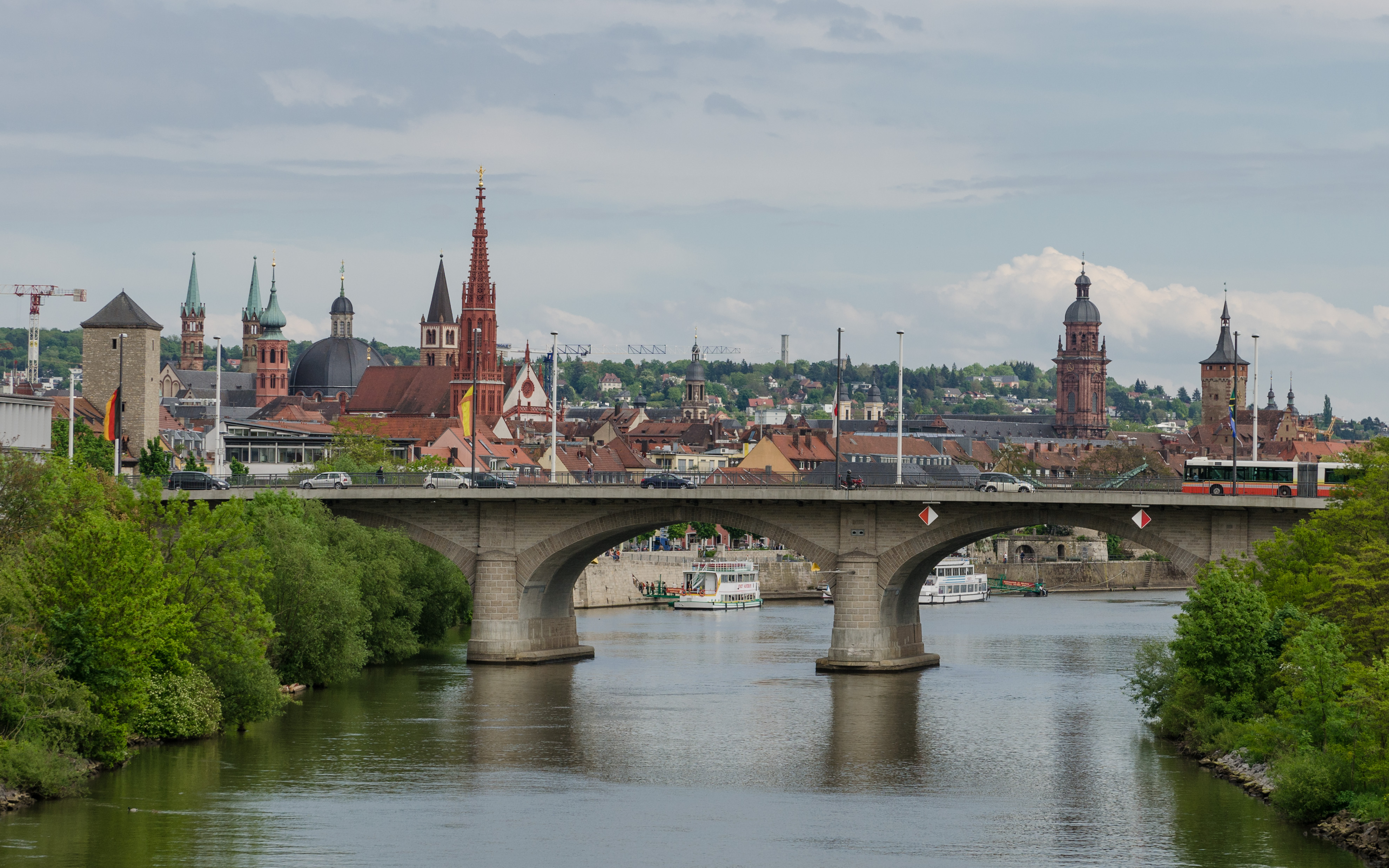
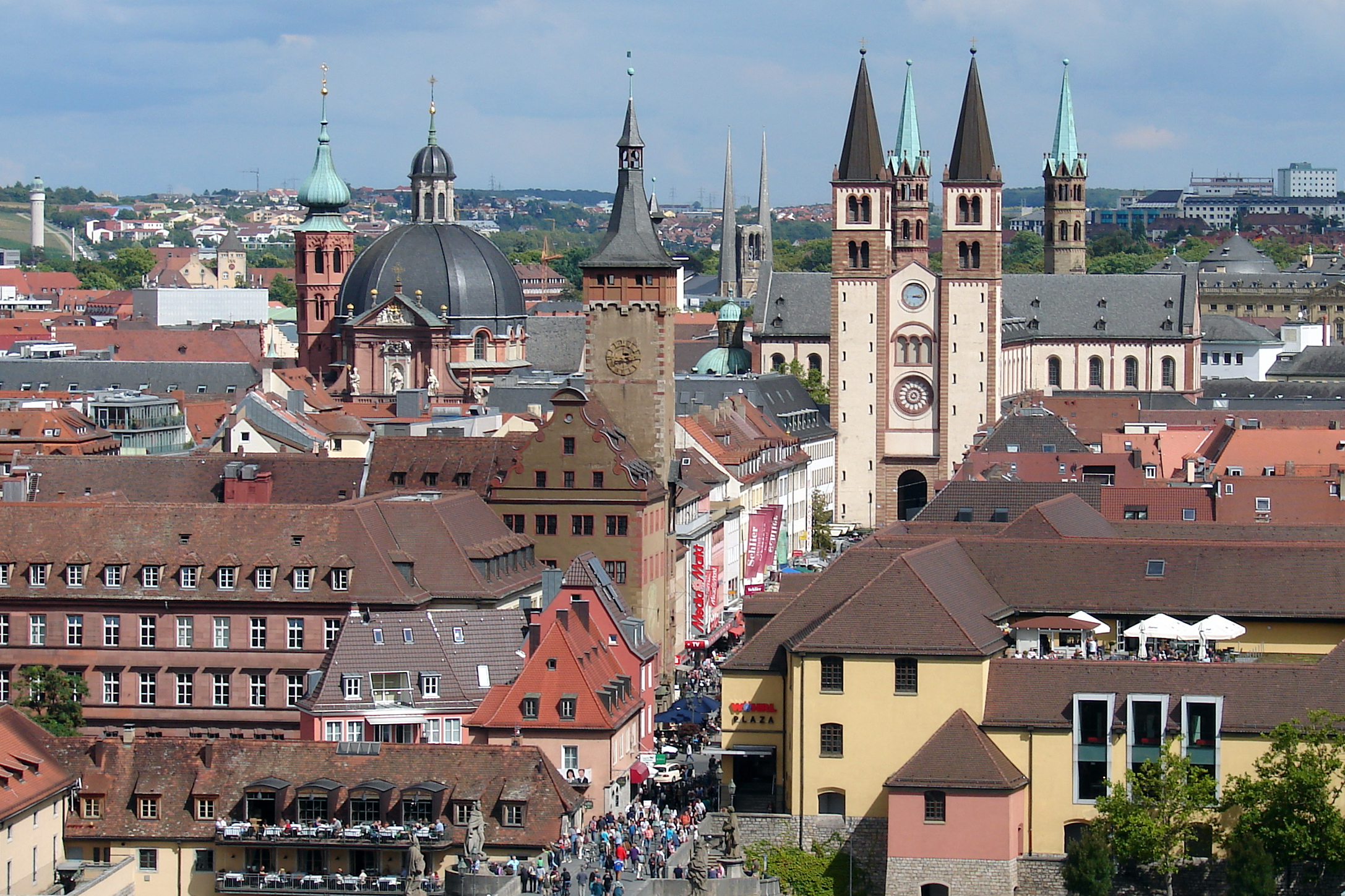
- Clockwise from top: Marienberg Fortress and Old Bridge – the Main with a newer bridge – the Old Town with the cathedral, narrow square and city hall – and the Residence, a world heritage site.

- Flag Coat of arms
- Interactive map of Würzburg
- Location within Germany Location within Bavaria
- Coordinates: 49°47′N 9°56′E
- Country: Germany
- State: Bavaria
- Admin. region: Lower Franconia
- District: Urban district

Government
  - Mayor (2025–32): Martin Heilig (Greens)

Area
  - Total: 87.66 km^{2} (33.85 sq mi)
- Elevation: 177 m (581 ft)

Population (2025-12-31)
  - Total: 133,753
  - Density: 1,526/km^{2} (3,952/sq mi)
- Time zone: UTC+01:00 (CET)
  - Summer (DST): UTC+02:00 (CEST)
- Postal codes: 97070–97084
- Dialling codes: 0931
- Vehicle registration: WÜ

Würzburg (/ˈwɜːrtsbɜːrɡ/ WURTS-burg or /ˈvɜːrts-/ VURTS-; German: [ˈvʏʁtsbʊʁk]; Main-Franconian: Wörtzburch) is the second-largest city in Franconia after Nuremberg and is located in the north of Bavaria. Würzburg is the administrative seat of the Regierungsbezirk Lower Franconia. It spans the banks of the Main river.

Würzburg is situated approximately 110 km (68 mi) west-northwest of Nuremberg and 120 km (75 mi) east-southeast of Frankfurt am Main. The population as of 2019 is approximately 130,000 residents.

Würzburg is famous for its partly rebuilt and reconstructed old town and its Würzburger Residenz, a palace that is a UNESCO World Heritage Site.

The regional dialect is East Franconian German.

== History ==
Timeline of Würzburg
Historical affiliations

Duchy of Franconia (to 1168)
Prince-Bishopric of Würzburg, 1168–1803
Electorate of Bavaria, 1803–1805
Grand Duchy of Würzburg, 1805–1814
Kingdom of Bavaria, 1814–1871
German Empire, (Kingdom of Bavaria), 1871–1918
German Reich, 1918–1919
Würzburg Soviet Republic, 1919
German Reich, 1919–1945
American-occupied zone, 1945–1949
Germany, 1949–present

=== Early and medieval history ===
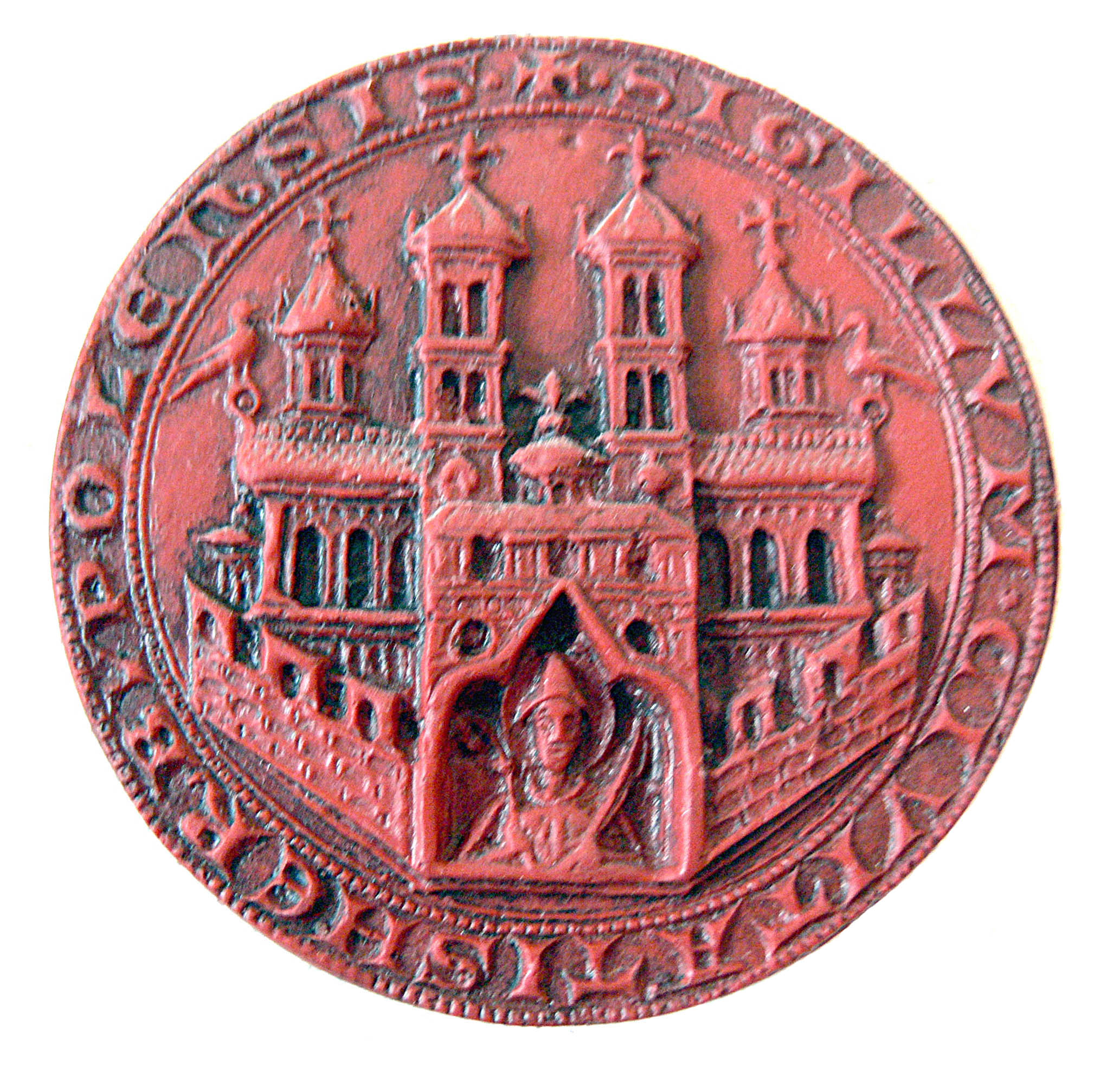
Impression of the city seal of 1319

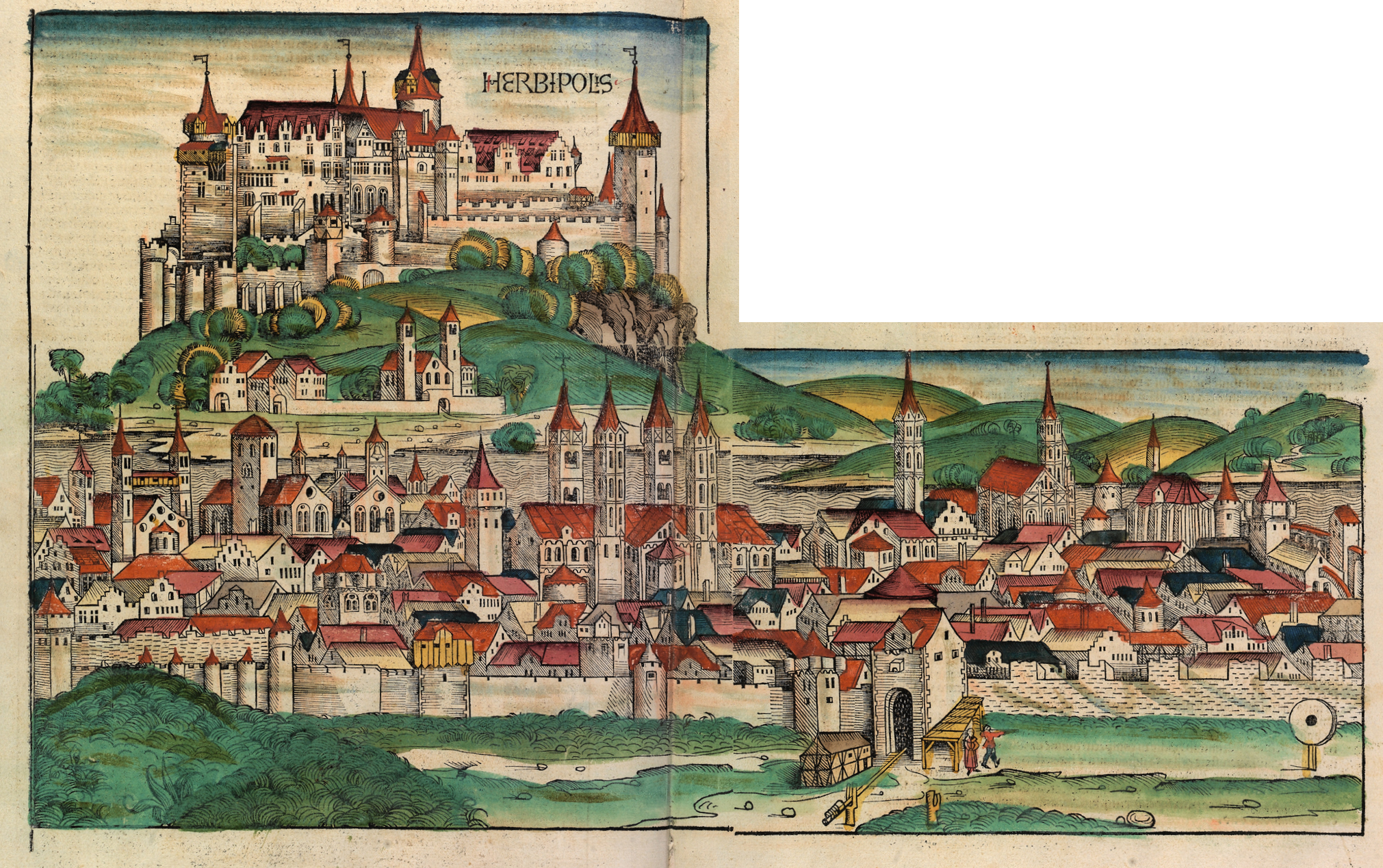
Woodcut depicting Würzburg from the Nuremberg Chronicle (1493)

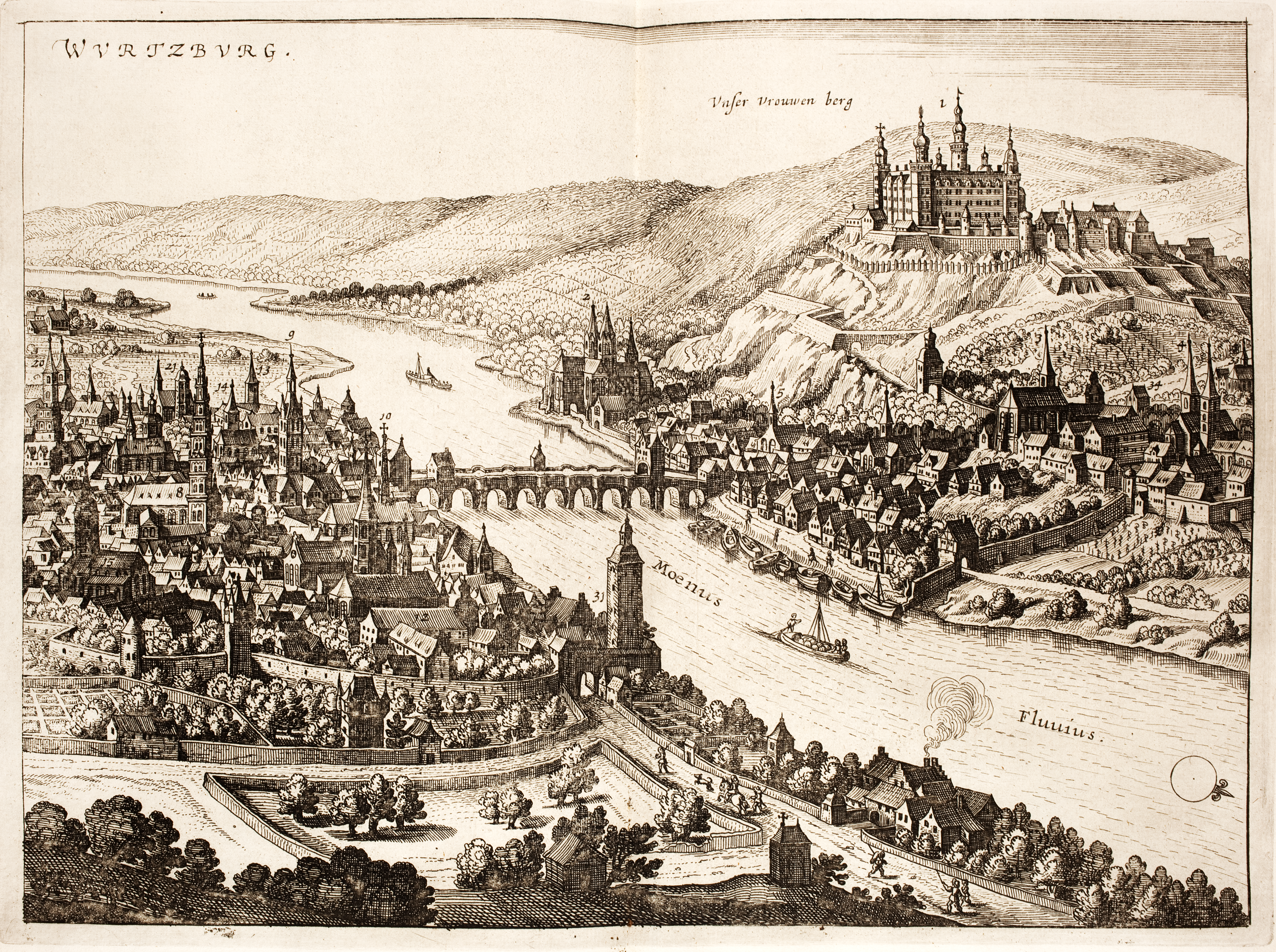
Panorama of Würzburg with castle Marienberg. Matthäus Merian in Cornelis Danckerts, "Historis", 1642.

A Bronze Age (Urnfield culture) refuge castle, the Celtic Segodunum, and later a Roman fort, stood on the hill known as the Leistenberg, the site of the present Fortress Marienberg. The former Celtic territory was settled by Alamanni in the 4th or 5th century later by the Franks in the 6th to 7th. Würzburg was the seat of a Merovingian duke from about 650. It was Christianized in 686 by Irish missionaries Kilian, Kolonat and Totnan. The city is mentioned in a donation by Duke Hedan II to bishop Willibrord, dated 1 May 704, in castellum Virteburch. The Ravenna Cosmography lists the city as Uburzis at about the same time. The name is presumably of Celtic origin, but based on a folk etymological connection to the German word Würze "herb, spice", the name was Latinized as Herbipolis in the medieval period.

The first diocese was founded by Saint Boniface in 742 when he appointed the first bishop of Würzburg, Saint Burkhard. The bishops eventually created a secular fiefdom, that extended to Eastern Franconia in the 12th century. The city was the site of several Imperial Diets, including the one of 1180, at which Henry the Lion, duke of Saxony and Bavaria, was banned for three years from the Empire and his duchy Bavaria was handed over to Otto of Wittelsbach. Massacres of Jews took place in 1147 and 1298.

The first church on the site of the present Würzburg Cathedral was built in 788 and consecrated that same year by Charlemagne; the current building was constructed from 1040 to 1225 in Romanesque style. The University of Würzburg was founded in 1402 and re-founded in 1582 by Julius Echter von Mespelbrunn. The citizens of the city revolted several times against the prince-bishop.

In 1397, King Wenceslaus IV of Bohemia visited the city and promised its people the status of a free Imperial City. However, the German ruling princes forced him to withdraw these promises. In 1400, the bishop's troops decisively defeated the citizenry in the Battle of Bergtheim, and the city fell under his control permanently until the dissolution of the fiefdom. During the German Peasants' War, a local town council member, Tilman Riemenschneider refused to obey an order by Konrad von Thüngen, the Prince-Bishop of Würzburg to fight the revolting peasants. This resulted in 8,000 peasants killed on 4 June 1525 just outside Würzburg. Riemenschneider and the entire town council was incarcerated and tortured in Marienberg Fortress.

=== Modern history ===
The Würzburg witch trials, which occurred between 1626 and 1631, are one of the largest peace-time mass trials. In Würzburg, under Bishop Philip Adolf, an estimated 600 to 900 alleged witches were burnt. In 1631, Swedish King Gustaf Adolf invaded and ended the witch burnings.

In 1720, the foundations of the Würzburg Residence were laid. In 1796, the Battle of Würzburg between Habsburg Austria and the French First Republic took place. The city passed to the Electorate of Bavaria in 1803 but, two years later, in the course of the Napoleonic Wars, it became the seat of the Electorate of Würzburg (until September 1806), the later Grand Duchy of Würzburg.

In 1814, the town became part of the Kingdom of Bavaria and a new bishopric was created seven years later, as the former one had been secularized in 1803 (see also Reichsdeputationshauptschluss). In 1817, Friedrich Koenig and Andreas Bauer founded Schnellpressenfabrik Koenig & Bauer (the world's first steam-driven printing press manufacturer).

The Hep-Hep riots from August to October 1819 were pogroms against Ashkenazi Jews, beginning in the Kingdom of Bavaria, during the period of Jewish emancipation in the German Confederation. The antisemitic communal violence began on August 2, 1819, in Würzburg and soon reached the outer regions of the German Confederation. Many Jews were killed, and much Jewish property was destroyed.

In 1848, Catholic bishops held the Würzburg Bishops' Conference, a forerunner of later German and Austrian conferences. By distinction, the Würzburg Conference is a name given to the meeting of representatives of the smaller German states in 1859 to devise some means of mutual support. The conference, however, had no result. Würzburg was bombarded and taken by the Prussians in 1866 when it ceased to be a fortress.

In the early 1930s, around 2,000 Jews lived in Würzburg, which was also a rabbinic centre. The Nazi Party in 1933 achieved total control. During the Kristallnacht pogroms in 1938, many Jewish houses and shops were raided, looted, or destroyed. The contents of two synagogues were stolen or destroyed. Many Jews were imprisoned and tortured by the Gestapo. Between November 1941 and June 1943, Jews from the city were sent to the Nazi concentration camps in Eastern Europe.

From April 1943 to March 1945 a subcamp of the Flossenbürg concentration camp was located in the city, with dozens of prisoners, mostly from Poland and the Soviet Union.

==== World War II bombing ====
On 16 March 1945, about 90% of the city was destroyed in 17 minutes by firebombing from 225 British Lancaster bombers during a World War II air raid. Würzburg became a target for its role as a traffic hub and to break the spirit of the population.

All of the city's churches, cathedrals, and other monuments were heavily damaged or destroyed. The city centre, which mostly dated from medieval times, was destroyed in a firestorm in which 5,000 people perished.

Over the next 20 years, the buildings of historical importance were painstakingly and accurately reconstructed. The citizens who rebuilt the city immediately after the end of the war were mostly women – Trümmerfrauen ("rubble women") – because the men were either dead or still prisoners of war. On a relative scale, Würzburg was destroyed to a larger extent than was Dresden in a firebombing the previous month. Today the whole of the old town is cited as a cultural heritage site after decades of rebuilding and reconstruction.

==== Battle of Würzburg ====
On 3 April 1945, Würzburg was occupied by the U.S. 12th Armored Division and the U.S. 42nd Infantry Division in a series of frontal assaults masked by smokescreens. The battle continued until the last German resistance was defeated on 5 April 1945.

== Geography ==
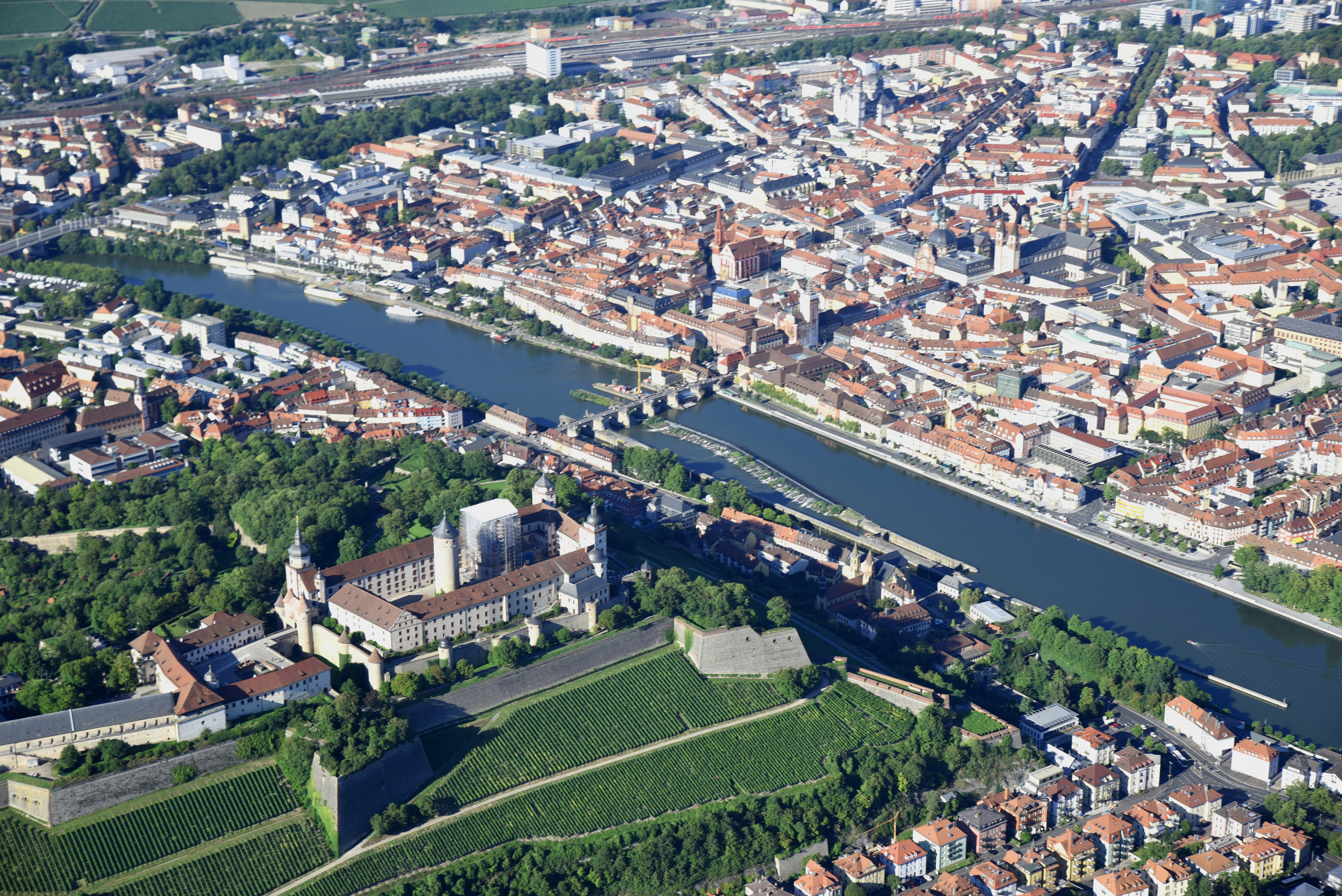
Würzburg with Fortress Marienberg and Main river

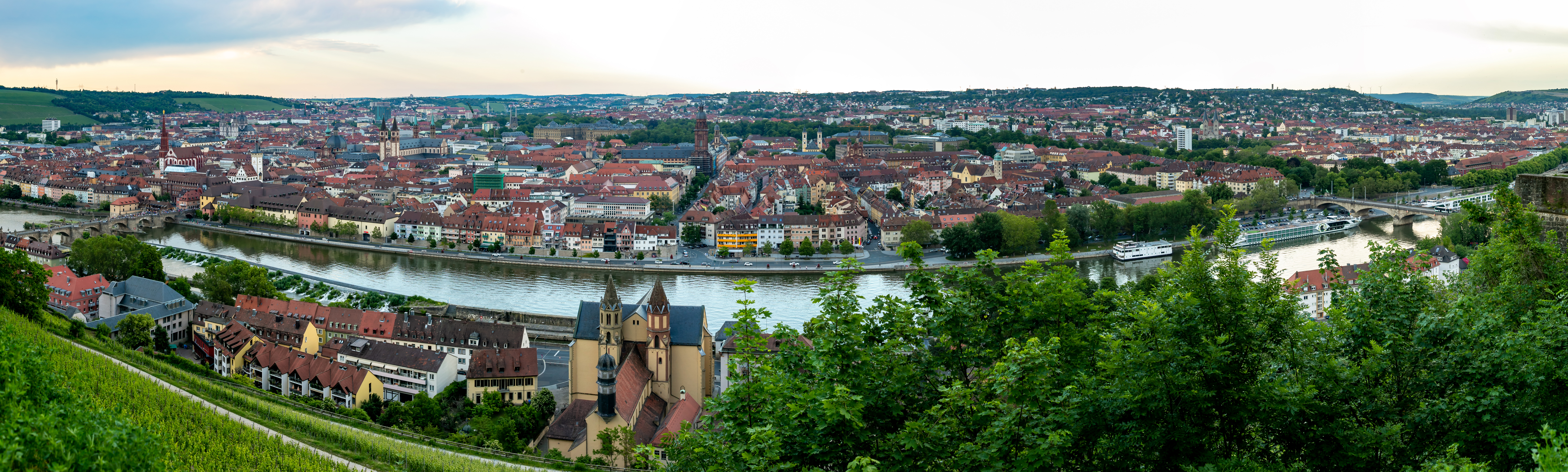
Panoramic view of city center from the fortress with Main river

Würzburg spans the banks of the river Main in the region of Lower Franconia in the north of the state of Bavaria, Germany. The heart of the town is on the locally eastern (right) bank. The town is enclosed by the Landkreis Würzburg but is not a part of it.

Würzburg covers an area of 87.6 square kilometres and lies at an altitude of around 177 metres.

Of the total municipal area, in 2007, building area accounted for 30%, followed by agricultural land (27.9%), forestry/wood (15.5%), green spaces (12.7%), traffic (5.4%), water (1.2%) and others (7.3%).

The centre of Würzburg is surrounded by hills. To the west lies the 266-meter Marienberg and the Nikolausberg (359 m) to the south of it. The Main flows through Würzburg from the southeast to the northwest.

=== City structure ===
Würzburg is divided into 13 Stadtbezirke which are additionally structured into 25 boroughs. The following overview shows the boroughs and their numbers allocated to the 13 municipalities.

01 Altstadt

- Dom (01)
- Neumünster (02)
- Peter (03)
- Innere Pleich (04)
- Haug (05)
- Äussere Pleich (06)
- Rennweg (09)
- Mainviertel (17)

02 Zellerau

- Zellerau (18)

03 Dürrbachtal

- Dürrbachau (07)
- Unterdürrbach (22)
- Oberdürrbach (23)

04 Grombühl

- Grombühl (08)

05 Lindleinsmühle

- Lindleinsmühle (19)

06 Frauenland

- Mönchberg (10)
- Frauenland (11)
- Keesburg (12)

07 Sanderau

- Sanderau (13)

08 Heidingsfeld

- Heidingsfeld (14)

09 Heuchelhof

- Heuchelhof (20)

10 Steinbachtal

- Steinbachtal (15)
- Nikolausberg (16)

11 Versbach

- Versbach (24)

12 Lengfeld

- Lengfeld (25)

13 Rottenbauer

- Rottenbauer (21)

== Demographics ==
Wurzburg's 2023 population is now estimated at 126,033.

=== Foreign population ===
Largest groups of foreign residents
| Nationality | Population (Dec. 2022) |
|---|---|
| Ukraine | 1,632 |
| Romania | 1,316 |
| Italy | 1,153 |
| Turkey | 1,086 |
| Poland | 759 |
| Russia | 603 |
| Greece | 588 |
| Afghanistan | 526 |
| China | 483 |
| Kosovo | 414 |

== Climate ==
Climate data for Würzburg (1991–2020 normals)
| Month | Jan | Feb | Mar | Apr | May | Jun | Jul | Aug | Sep | Oct | Nov | Dec | Year |
|---|---|---|---|---|---|---|---|---|---|---|---|---|---|
| Mean daily maximum °C (°F) | 3.8 (38.8) | 5.6 (42.1) | 10.4 (50.7) | 15.8 (60.4) | 19.9 (67.8) | 23.3 (73.9) | 25.5 (77.9) | 25.4 (77.7) | 20.4 (68.7) | 14.3 (57.7) | 8.0 (46.4) | 4.5 (40.1) | 14.7 (58.5) |
| Daily mean °C (°F) | 1.2 (34.2) | 2.0 (35.6) | 5.8 (42.4) | 10.3 (50.5) | 14.4 (57.9) | 17.8 (64.0) | 19.7 (67.5) | 19.3 (66.7) | 14.8 (58.6) | 9.9 (49.8) | 5.0 (41.0) | 2.0 (35.6) | 10.2 (50.4) |
| Mean daily minimum °C (°F) | −1.4 (29.5) | −1.2 (29.8) | 1.6 (34.9) | 4.9 (40.8) | 8.9 (48.0) | 12.3 (54.1) | 14.1 (57.4) | 13.8 (56.8) | 10.0 (50.0) | 6.2 (43.2) | 2.4 (36.3) | −0.4 (31.3) | 5.9 (42.6) |
| Average precipitation mm (inches) | 40.0 (1.57) | 35.8 (1.41) | 40.2 (1.58) | 32.7 (1.29) | 57.3 (2.26) | 52.9 (2.08) | 65.8 (2.59) | 56.3 (2.22) | 47.2 (1.86) | 47.6 (1.87) | 46.2 (1.82) | 51.5 (2.03) | 573.5 (22.58) |
| Average precipitation days (≥ 1.0 mm) | 14.9 | 13.8 | 14.1 | 12.2 | 13.0 | 13.3 | 14.0 | 12.4 | 12.0 | 14.6 | 14.3 | 17.2 | 165.8 |
| Average snowy days (≥ 1.0 cm) | 8.2 | 4.2 | 1.8 | 0 | 0 | 0 | 0 | 0 | 0 | 0 | 1.0 | 4.6 | 19.8 |
| Average relative humidity (%) | 84.7 | 80.5 | 73.6 | 66.2 | 68.4 | 68.5 | 67.7 | 68.8 | 76.0 | 83.6 | 87.8 | 87.8 | 76.1 |
| Mean monthly sunshine hours | 54.8 | 84.4 | 132.3 | 190.7 | 215.4 | 223.9 | 237.1 | 226.2 | 166.7 | 106.7 | 51.5 | 42.7 | 1,724.9 |
Source: World Meteorological Organization

== Economy ==
Würzburg had the oldest pizzeria in Germany, Bier- und Speisewirtschaft Capri, opened by Nick di Camillo in 1952. Camillo received the honour of the Italian Order of Merit.

In 2017, the GDP per inhabitant was €62,229, placing the district 13th out of 96 districts (rural and urban) in Bavaria (overall average: €46,698).

=== Military ===
Following World War II, Würzburg was occupied by the U.S. Army's 1st and 3rd infantry divisions. The last U.S. troops were withdrawn in 2008.

== Arts and culture ==
Notable artists who lived in Würzburg include poet Walther von der Vogelweide (12th and 13th centuries), philosopher Albertus Magnus and painter Matthias Grünewald. Sculptor Tilman Riemenschneider (1460–1531) served as mayor and participated in the German Peasants' War. Richard Wagner became chorusmaster at the city's theater in 1833 and finished his first opera, Die Feen (The Fairies), there that year.

=== Main sights ===
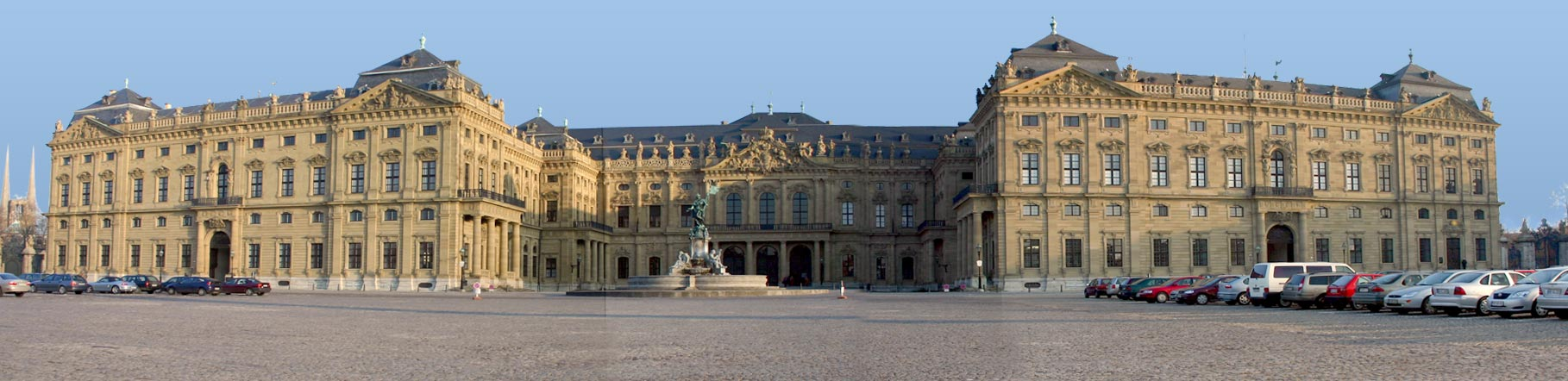
Residence (front view)

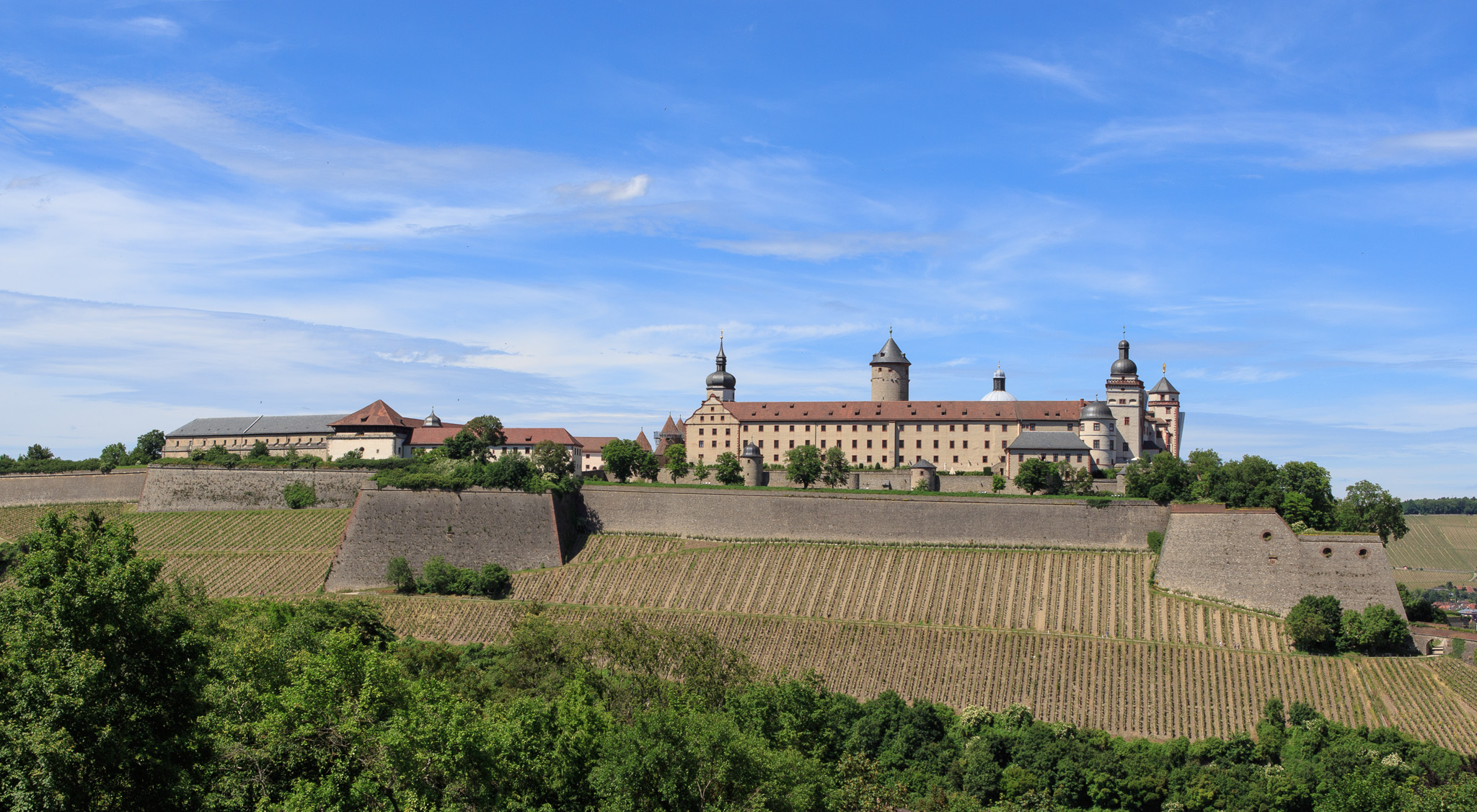
Marienberg Fortress

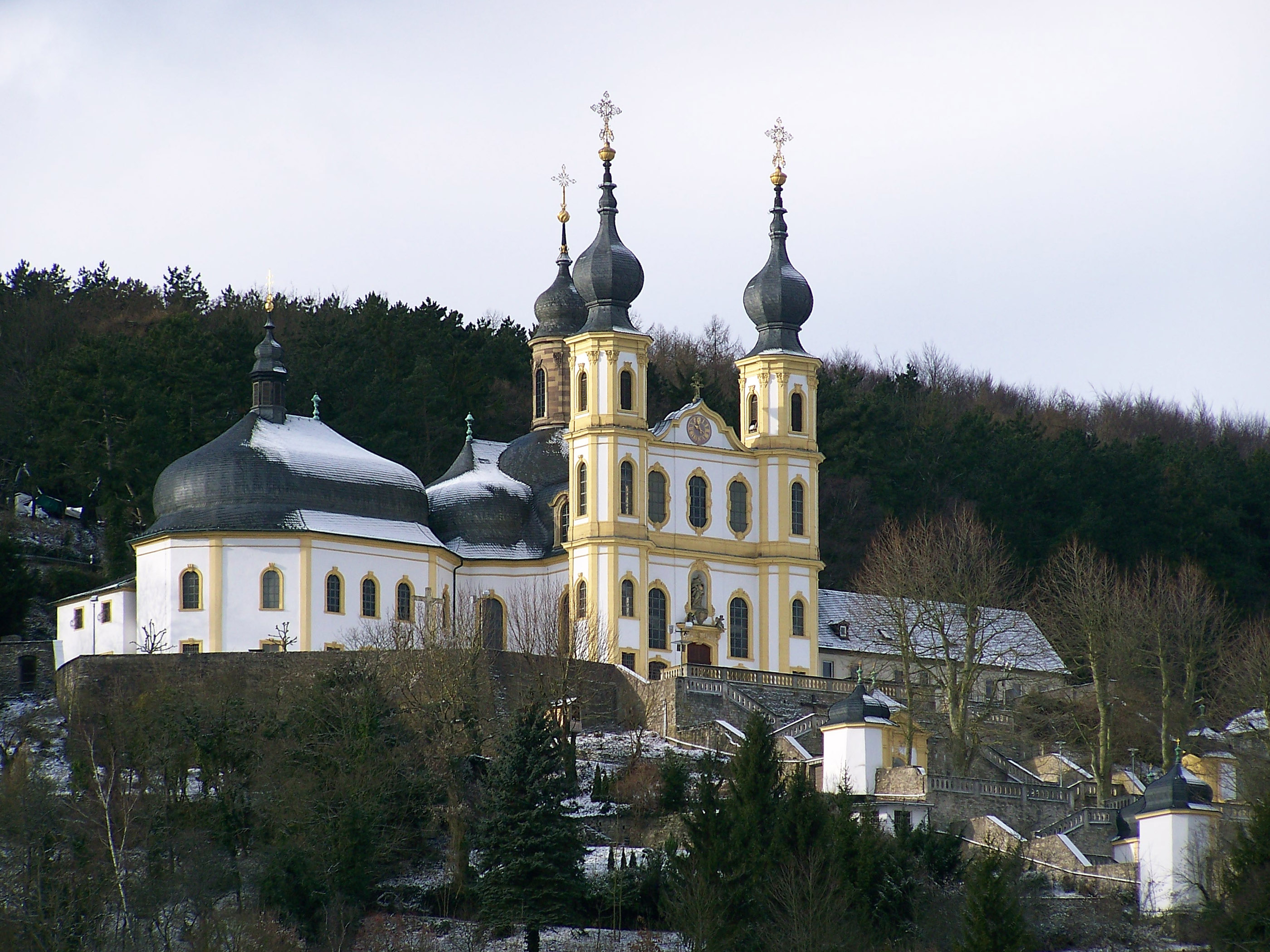
Käppele

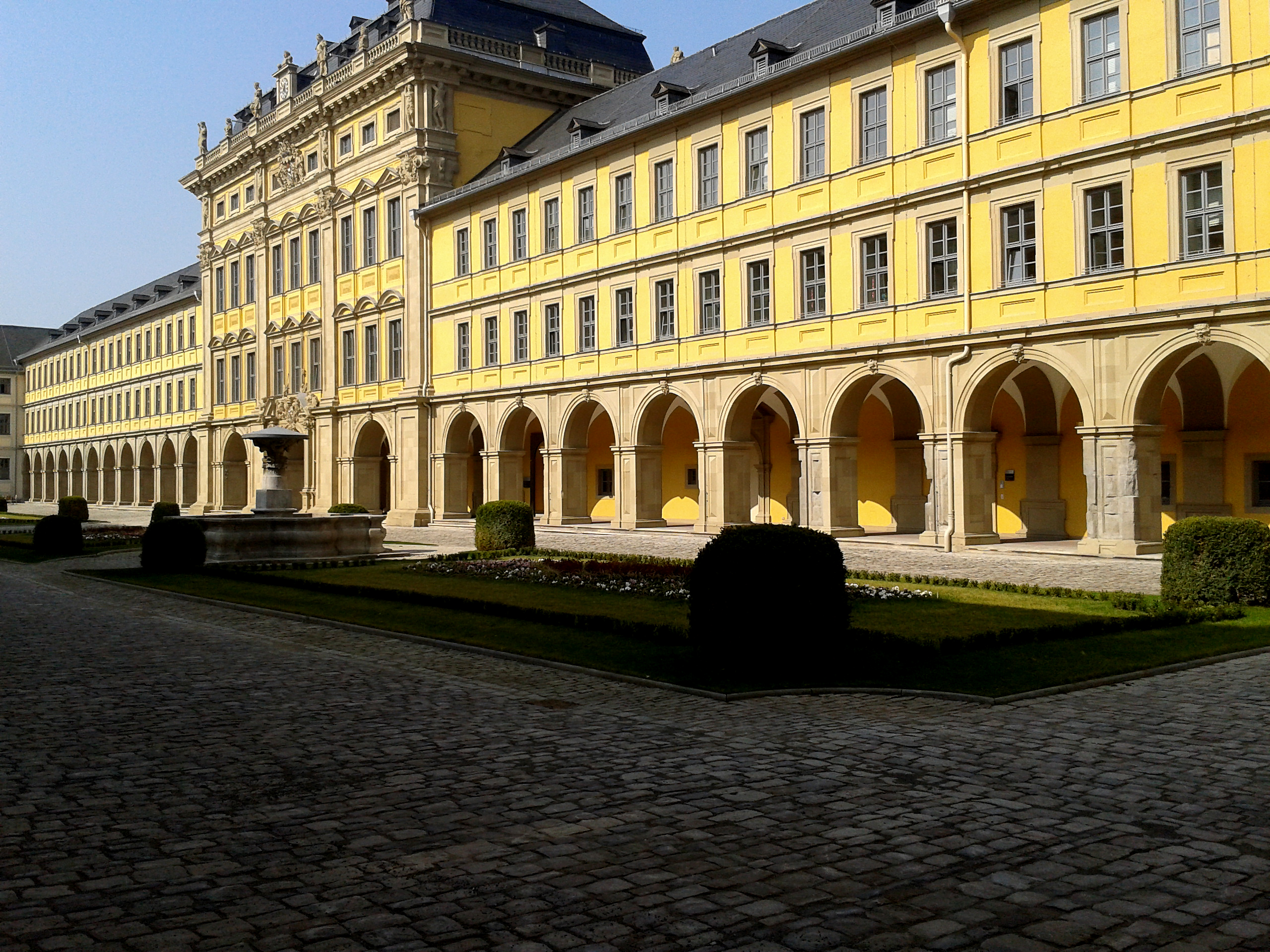
Juliusspital

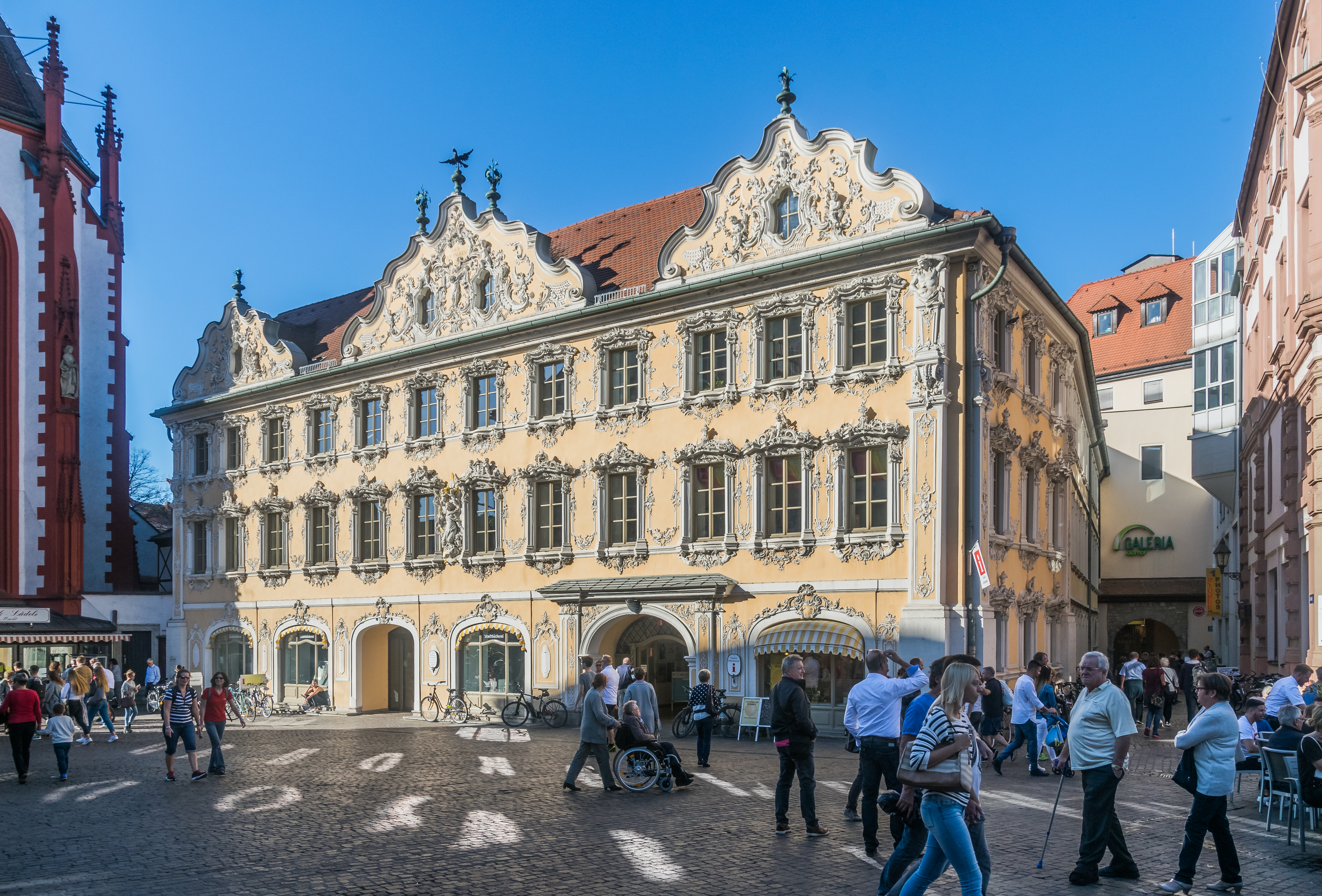
Falkenhaus

- Würzburger Residenz: A UNESCO World Heritage Site, the vast compound near the center of the town was commissioned by two prince-bishops, the brothers Johann Philipp Franz and Friedrich Karl von Schönborn. Several architects, including Johann Lukas von Hildebrandt and Maximilian von Welsch, supervised the construction between 1720 and 1744, in imitation of the Palace of Versailles, but it is mainly associated with the name of Balthasar Neumann, the creator of its famous Baroque staircase. The palace suffered severe damage in the British bombing of March 1945 but has been completely rebuilt. The main attractions are:
  - Hofkirche: The church interior is richly decorated with paintings, sculptures and stucco ornaments. The altars were painted by Giovanni Battista Tiepolo.
  - Treppenhaus: Here Giovanni Battista Tiepolo created the largest fresco in the world, which adorns the vault over the staircase designed by Balthasar Neumann.
  - Kaisersaal: The "Imperial Hall", the centerpiece of the palace, testifies to the close relationship between Würzburg and the Holy Roman Empire.
- Festung Marienberg is a fortress on Marienberg, the hill to the west of the city centre, overlooking the whole town area and the surrounding hills. Most current structures date to the Renaissance and Baroque periods, but the chapel's foundations go back to the 8th century.

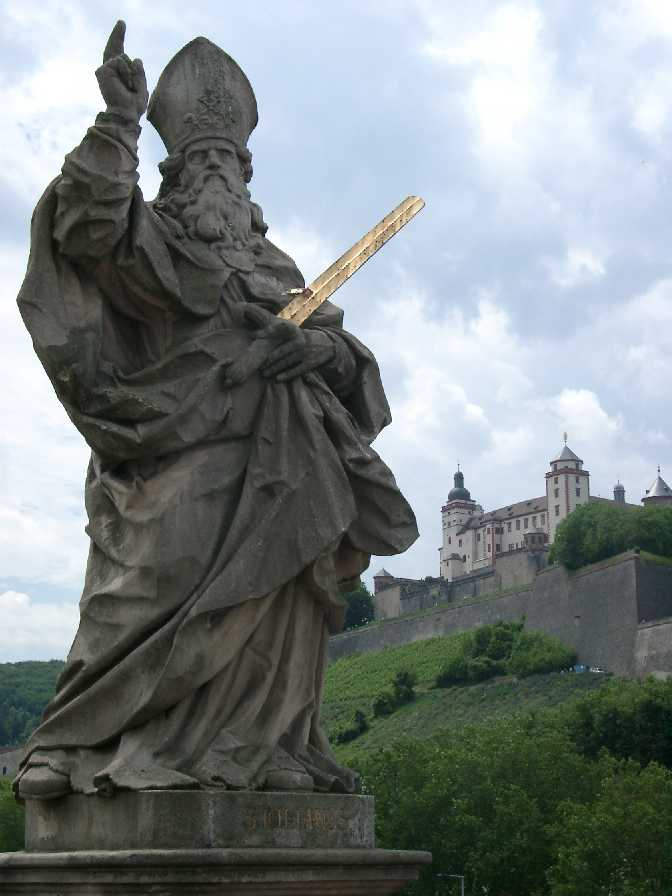
The statue of St Kilian, with the Marienberg Fortress on the right

- Alte Mainbrücke (Old Main Bridge) was built in 1473–1543 to replace the destroyed Romanesque bridge dated 1133. In two phases, beginning in 1730, the bridge was adorned with twelve 4.5-meter statues of saints and historically important figures like John of Nepomuk, Mary and Saint Joseph, Charlemagne and Pepin the Short. Explosives damaged the bridge in the final days of World War II. US troops threw the original Pepin into the river to make way for an anti-aircraft gun.
- The Rathaus or city hall of Würzburg differs from those of most Imperial Cities in that it was not a sumptuous edifice purpose-built in Renaissance style. Rather, the motley collection of buildings and wings reflects that after 1426 the city was permanently under the bishop's control, who did not allow a representative new building. The Rathaus consists of parts dating from 1339 (chapel), 1453 (tower with the town's first public clock), 1544 (southwest oriel), and 1659/60 (Roter Bau). In 1822 the three-winged structure of the neighboring Karmeliterkloster (monastery of the Carmelites) was added to the city hall. The "Renaissance" row on Karmeliterstrasse was built only in 1898.
- Among Würzburg's many notable churches are the Käppele, a small Baroque/Rococo chapel by Balthasar Neumann, perched on a hill facing the fortress, and the Dom (Würzburg Cathedral). The Baroque Schönbornkapelle, a side-chapel of the cathedral, has interior decoration of (artificial) human bones and skulls. Also in the cathedral are two of Tilman Riemenschneider's most famous works, the tombstones of Rudolf II von Scherenberg (1466–1495) and Lorenz von Bibra (1495–1519). At the entrance to the Marienkapelle (on the market square; built between 1377 and 1441) stand replicas of the statues of Adam and Eve by Riemenschneider. The Neumünster is a Romanesque (11th century) minster church with a Baroque façade and dome. Its crypt (Kiliansgruft) houses the relics of Kilian, Totnan, and Kolonat. There are also two stone sarcophagi from the 8th century, the tombs of the first and second Bishop of Würzburg, Burkard and Megingaud. The latter's tomb features the oldest post-Roman monumental inscription in Franconia. Next to the Neumünster is the Lusamgärtchen. It contains a memorial from 1930 to Walther von der Vogelweide, who very likely was buried here in 1230. Only the church remains of the town's oldest abbey, St Burchard's Abbey founded around 750. It was transformed into a collegiate church in 1464 and dissolved in 1803. Among the Baroque churches in the city centre is Stift Haug (1670–1691), St. Michael, St. Stephan and St. Peter. The church of St Burkhard was built between 1033 and 1042 in the Romanesque style and was restored in 1168. The Late Gothic choir dates from 1494 to 1497.
- The Juliusspital is a Baroque hospital with a courtyard and a church originally established by prince-bishop Julius Echter in 1576. The 160 m long northern wing was added by Italian architect Antonio Petrini in 1700–1704. Beneath it lies the similarly sized wine cellar, which (together with those of the Würzburg Residence and the Bürgerspital) offers a chance to taste the local Frankenwein in a unique environment. The Juliusspital is the second largest winery in Germany, growing wine on 1.68 square kilometres (1 square mile).
- The Haus zum Falken on Marktplatz, next to the Marienkapelle, with its ornate stucco façade, is an achievement of the Würzburg Rococo period. In the past, it served as an inn, and today it houses a public library and the tourist information office.
- The Stift Haug (formally the Stiftskirche St. Johannis im Haug, dedicated to John the Baptist and John the Evangelist) was built in the years 1670–1691 as the first Baroque church in Franconia. It was designed by Antonio Petrini. The former church had been demolished as it was in the way of new city fortifications built by Johann Philipp von Schönborn. In 1945 most of the church's interior was destroyed. Works of art include a crucifixion by Tintoretto loaned by the Bavarian State Painting Collections.
- The Würzburger Stein vineyard just outside the city is one of Germany's oldest and largest vineyards.

=== Museums and galleries ===
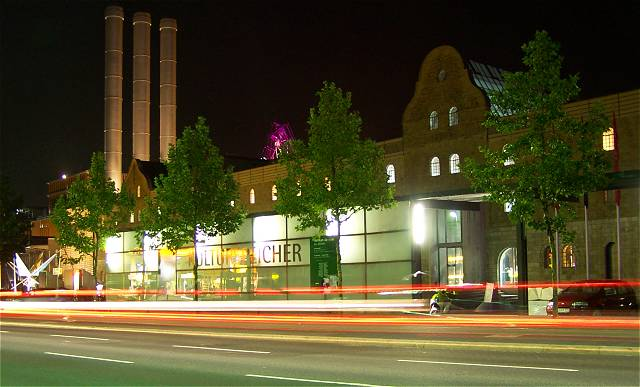
Kulturspeicher at night

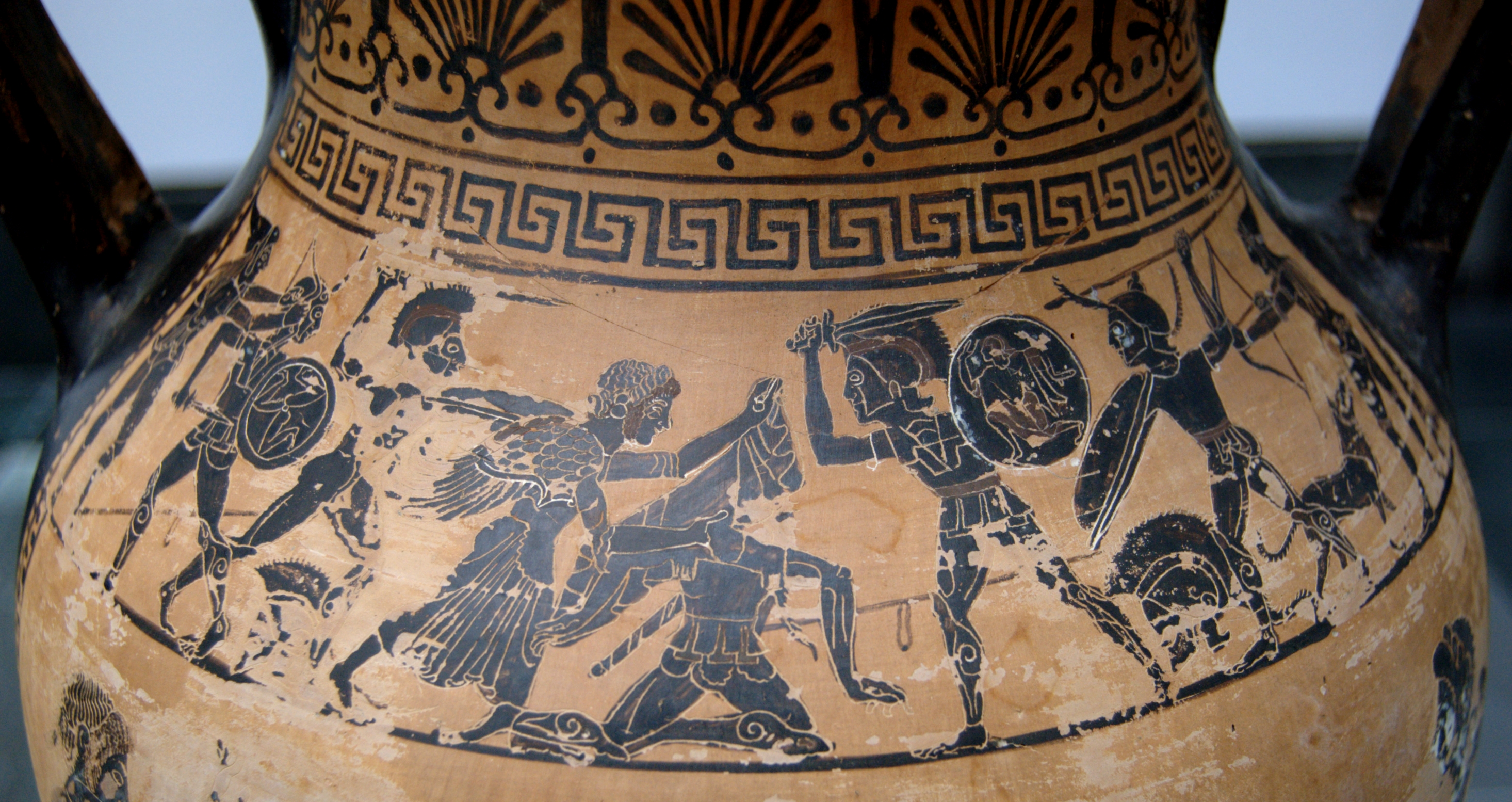
Black-figure Etruscan amphora in the Martin-von-Wagner-Museum

- The Museum für Franken (formerly the Mainfränkisches Museum) in the fortress is home to the world's largest collection of works by Tilman Riemenschneider. In a space of 5,400 m^{2} (58,125 sq ft), art by regional artists is exhibited. Exhibitions include a pre-historic collection, artifacts of the Franconian wine culture, and an anthropological collection with traditional costumes.
- Fürstenbaumuseum: Also in the fortress, the restored Fürstenbau (former residence of the prince-bishops) houses not only the renovated living quarters but also an exhibit on the history of Würzburg. Another exhibit features ecclesial gold jewelry and a collection of liturgical vestments. The museum also displays two models of the city: Würzburg in 1525 and Würzburg in 1945.
- Museum im Kulturspeicher, housed in a historic grain storage building combined with modern architecture, has more than 3,500 m^{2} of exhibit space. Collections include the Peter C. Ruppert Collection, with European Concrete art after 1945 from artists such as Max Bill and Victor Vasarely; works from the Age of Romanticism, the Biedermeier period, Impressionism, Expressionism as well as contemporary art.
- Museum am Dom (Museum at the cathedral), opened in 2003. It features about 700 pieces of art spanning the past 1,000 years. The 1,800 m^{2} exhibit contrasts contemporary art with older works.
- Shalom Europe, a Jewish museum. Built around 1,504 tombstones discovered and excavated in the old city, the museum uses modern information technology to portray present and traditional Jewish lifestyles and their survival over the past 900 years in Würzburg.
- Martin von Wagner Museum, with objects from ancient Egypt, Greece, and Rome. It is housed in the south wing of the Residence and displays ancient marble statues and burial objects. There are also ten exhibition halls with art from the 14th to the 19th centuries.
- Siebold-Museum, which houses permanent and temporary exhibits, including the estate of the 19th-century local physician and Japan researcher Philipp Franz von Siebold.
- The Röntgen Memorial Site in Würzburg, Germany is dedicated to the work of the German physicist Wilhelm Conrad Röntgen (1845–1923) and his discovery of X-rays, for which he was granted the Nobel Prize in physics. It contains an exhibition of historical instruments, machines, and documents.

== Sports ==
NBA Hall of Famer Dirk Nowitzki was born and grew up in Würzburg. Nowitzki and numerous other German national team players started their careers at the local Baskets Würzburg club that plays in the Basketball Bundesliga as of 2016. In the past, the club played in international competitions such as the Eurocup.

Würzburg is also home to the football teams Würzburger Kickers and Würzburger FV playing in the Fußball-Bayernliga.

SV Würzburg 05 is a swimming and water polo club in the German Water Polo League. The city also hosts wrestling, rowing, and American football clubs whose teams compete on the regional and national levels.

== Governance ==
Würzburg is the administrative seat of the Regierungsbezirk Lower Franconia. The administration of the Landkreis Würzburg (district) is also located in the town.

From April 2014 to May 2025, the mayor of Würzburg was Christian Schuchardt (CDU).

Since May 2025, the mayor of Würzburg has been Martin Heilig.

== Education and research ==
Würzburg has several internationally recognized institutions in science and research:

=== University ===
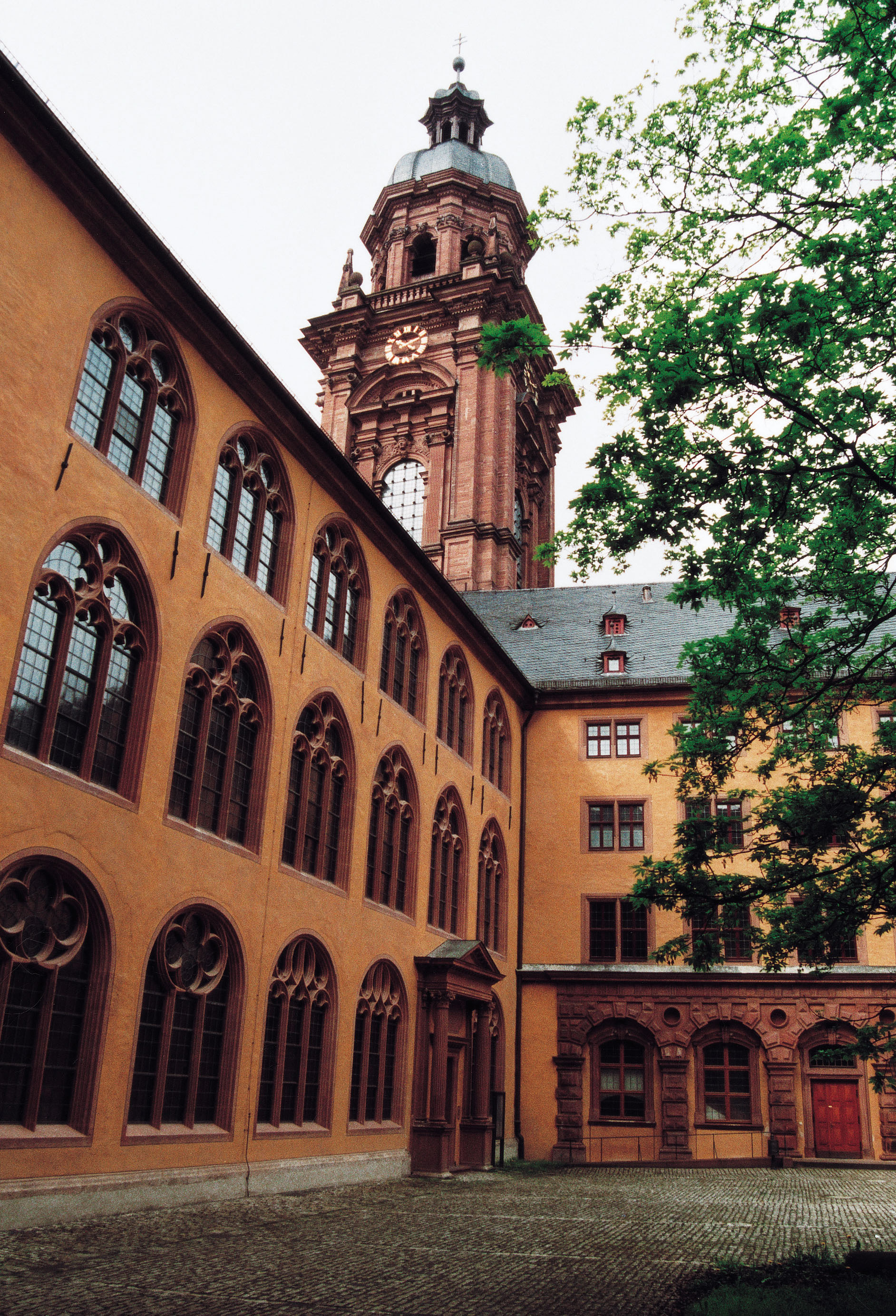
Alte Universität, the old Renaissance building of Würzburg University

The University of Würzburg (official name Julius-Maximilians-Universität Würzburg) was founded in 1402 and is one of the oldest universities in Germany.

Academic disciplines are astronomy, biology, Catholic theology, chemistry, computer science, culture, economics, educational and social sciences, geography, history, languages and linguistics, law, literature, mathematics, medicine (human medicine, dentistry and biomedicine), pharmacy, philosophy, physics, political science, psychology and sociology.

Today, the ten faculties are spread throughout the city. The university currently enrolls approximately 29,000 students, out of which more than 1,000 come from other countries.

- Wilhelm Röntgen's original laboratory, where he discovered X-rays in 1895, is at the University of Würzburg.
- The university awarded Alexander Graham Bell an honorary PhD for his pioneering scientific work.
- The Botanischer Garten der Universität Würzburg is the university's botanical garden.

=== University of Applied Science ===
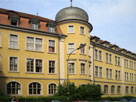
University of Applied Sciences Würzburg-Schweinfurt main building in the city centre

The University of Applied Sciences Würzburg-Schweinfurt was founded in 1971 as an institute of technology with departments in Würzburg and Schweinfurt. Academic disciplines are architecture, business economics, business informatics, civil engineering, computational engineering, computer science, electrical engineering, engineering management, geodesy, graphic design, logistics, mechanical engineering, media, nursing theory, plastics engineering, and social work. With nearly 8,000 students, it is the second-largest university of applied science in Franconia.

=== Conservatory ===
The Conservatory of Würzburg is an institution with a long tradition as well as an impressive success story of more than 200 years. It was founded in 1797 as Collegium musicum academicum and is Germany's oldest conservatory. Nowadays, it is known as University of Music Würzburg. After the commutation from the conservatory to the university of music in the early 1970s, science and research were added to complement music education.

== Transport ==
=== Roads ===
Due to its central position Würzburg is an important traffic hub. It is the site of the interchange of Autobahn highways A3 (Cologne – Frankfurt – Würzburg – Nuremberg) and A7 (Hamburg – Hanover – Kassel – Würzburg – Ulm) as well as the start of A81 (Würzburg – Heilbronn – Stuttgart). Furthermore, Bundesstraße highways B8, B13, B19 and B27 pass through the city.

=== Rail ===
The city's main station is a central hub for long-distance and regional services. Würzburg lies at the southern end of the Hanover-Würzburg high-speed rail line. Train services offers frequent InterCityExpress and InterCity connections to cities such as Cologne, Frankfurt, Hanover, Hamburg, Munich, Nuremberg, and Vienna. In addition to the main station, there are three regional stations, Würzburg-South, Würzburg Zell, and Würzburg Heidingsfeld Ost.

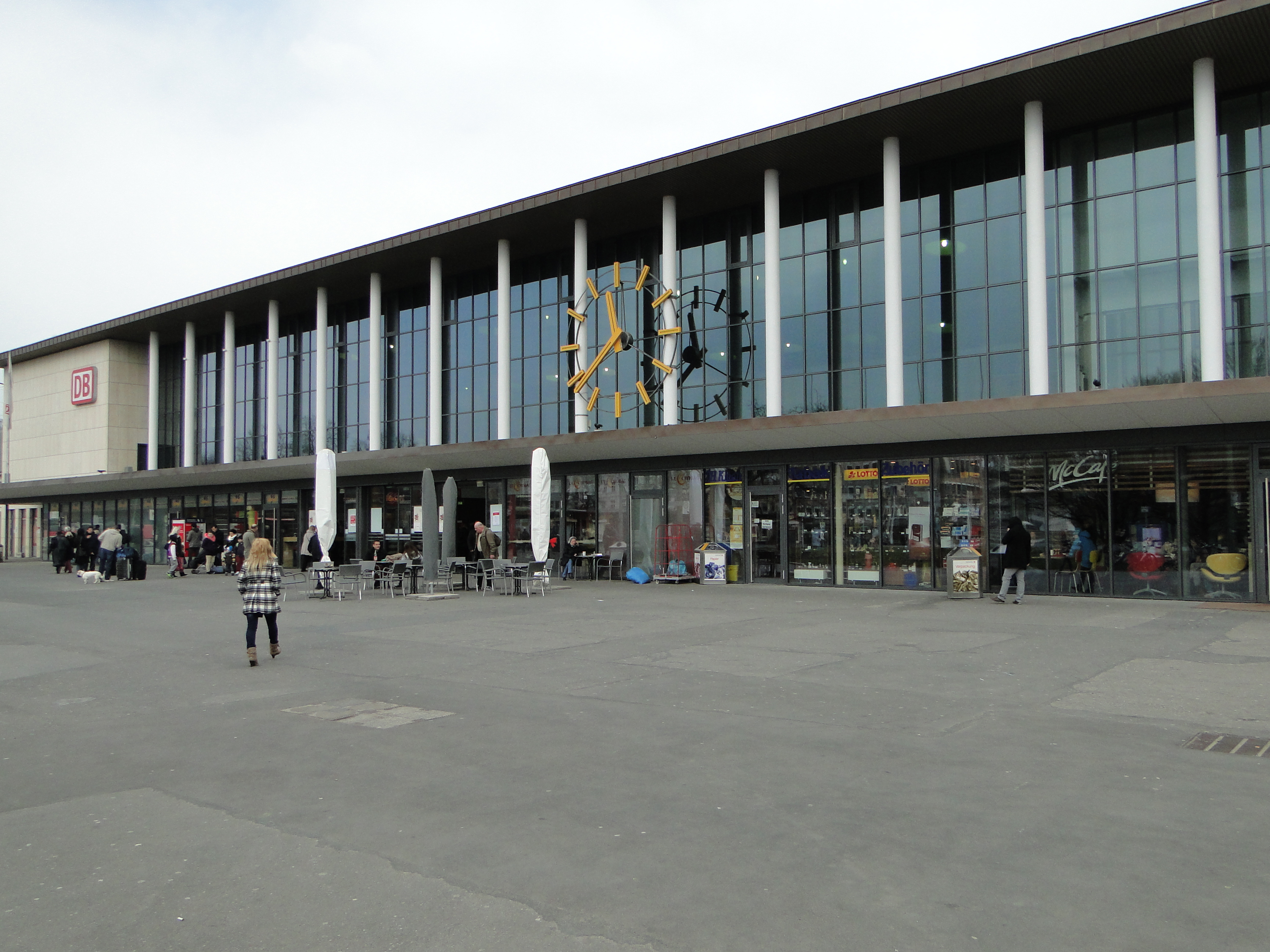
Würzburg Main station

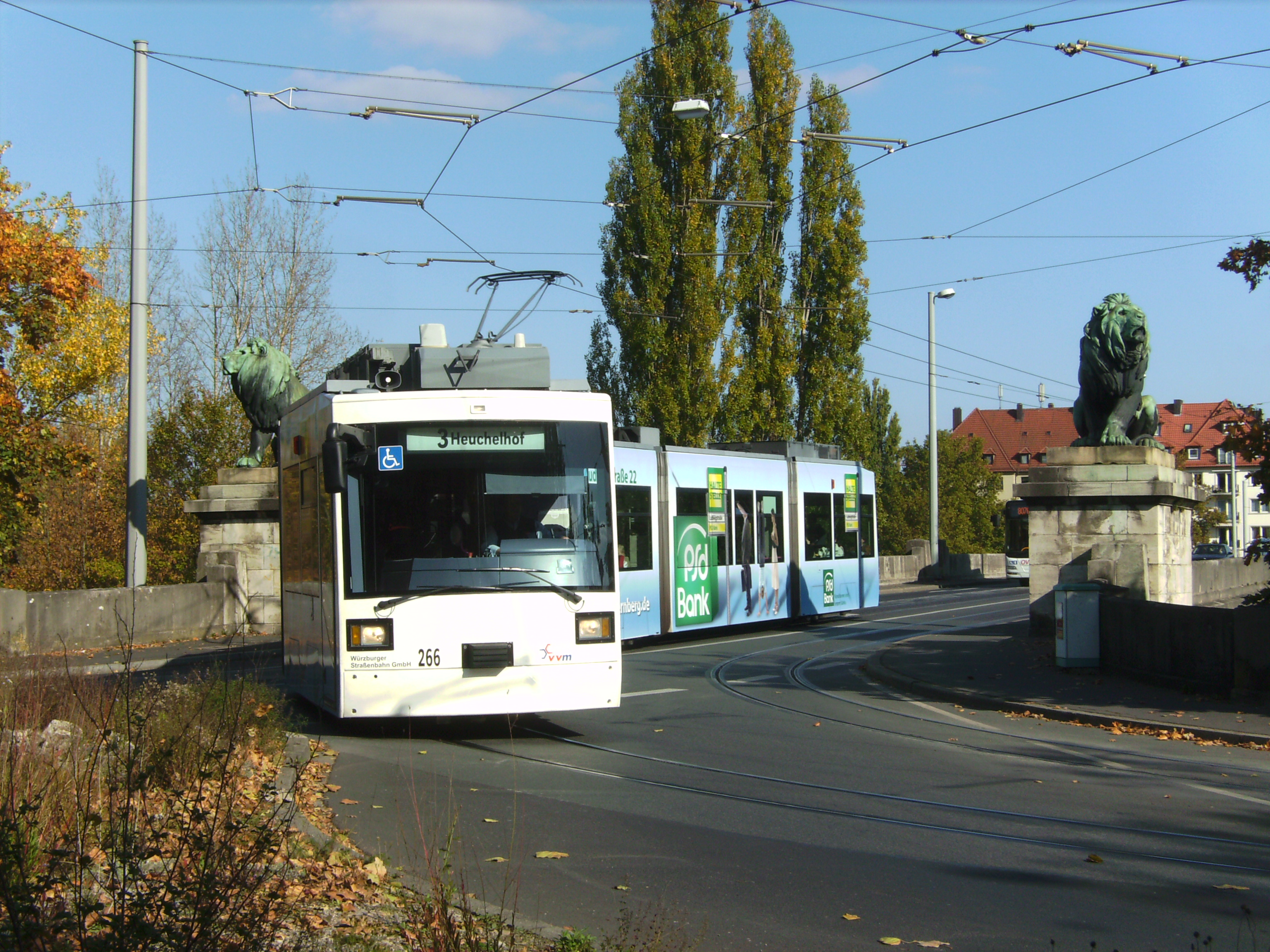
A Würzburg tram crosses the river Main on the Löwenbrücke. Tram trains depart from Würzburg main station, not just buses.

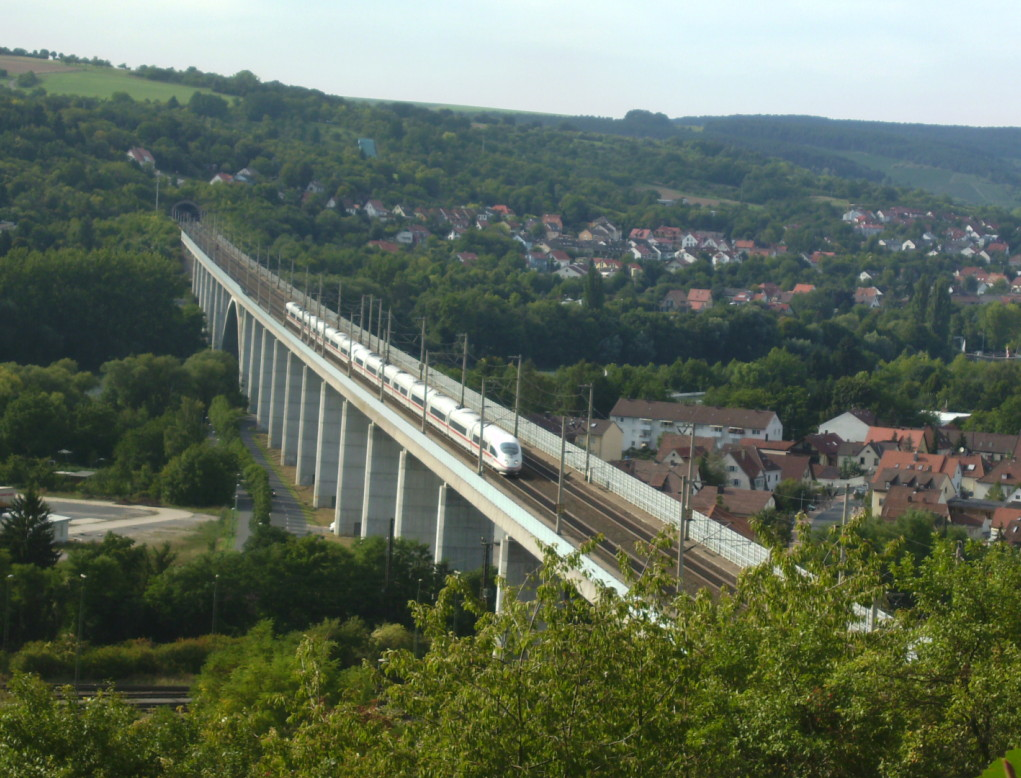
Hanover–Würzburg high-speed railway crossing the river Main north of Würzburg

| Long distance | Route |
|---|---|
| ICE (Linie 25) | Munich – Nuremberg – Würzburg – Kassel – Hanover – Hamburg |
| ICE (Linie 25) | Munich – Augsburg – Würzburg – Kassel – Hanover – Hamburg / – Bremen |
| ICE (Linie 31) | Vienna – Linz – Passau – Nuremberg – Würzburg – Frankfurt (Main) – Mainz – Koblenz – Cologne – Wuppertal – Hagen – Dortmund |
| ICE (Linie 41) | Munich – Nuremberg – Würzburg – Frankfurt (Main) – Cologne – Düsseldorf – Essen |

| regional | Route |
|---|---|
| Regional-Express | Würzburg – Kitzingen – Neustadt (Aisch) – Fürth – Nuremberg |
| Regional-Express | Würzburg – Aschaffenburg – Hanau – Frankfurt (Main) |
| Regional-Express | Würzburg – Osterburken – Heilbronn – Ludwigsburg – Stuttgart |
| Regional-Express | Würzburg – Schweinfurt – Bamberg – Lichtenfels – Hof/–Bayreuth |
| Regional-Express | Würzburg – Bamberg – Erlangen – Fürth – Nuremberg |
| Regional-Express | Würzburg – Schweinfurt – Bad Kissingen / – Münnerstadt – Bad Neustadt – Mellrichstadt – Meiningen – Suhl – Arnstadt – Erfurt |
| Regional train | Schlüchtern – Jossa – Gemünden (Main) – Würzburg – Schweinfurt – Bamberg |
| Regional train | Karlstadt – Würzburg– Steinach – Ansbach – Treuchtlingen |
| Regional train | Würzburg – Kitzingen |
| Regional train | Würzburg – Bad Mergentheim – Weikersheim – Crailsheim |

=== Trams/Trains ===
Würzburg has a tram network of five lines with a length of 19.7 kilometres (12.2 miles).

| Line | Route | Time | Stops |
|---|---|---|---|
| 1 | Grombühl – Sanderau | 20 minutes | 20 |
| 2 | Hauptbahnhof (Main station) – Zellerau | 14 minutes | 11 |
| 3 | Hauptbahnhof (Main Station) – Heuchelhof | 27 minutes | 20 |
| 4 | Sanderau – Zellerau | 23 min. | 18 |
| 5 | Grombühl – Rottenbauer | 39 minutes | 31 |

The proposed Line 6 from Hauptbahnhof (Main Station) to Hubland university campus via Residenz is scheduled to be completed after 2018.

=== Buses ===
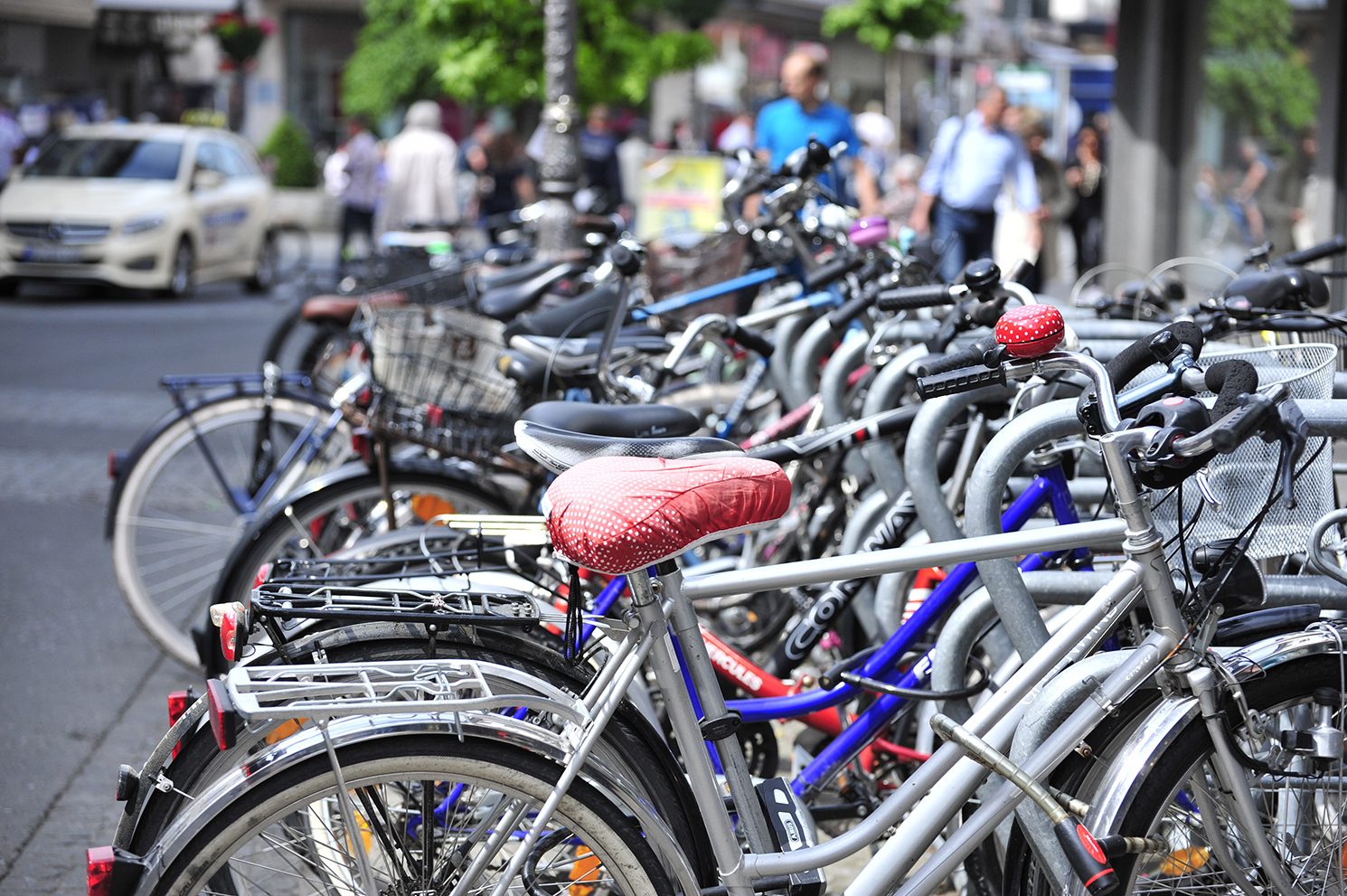
Bikes are a popular means of transportation in Würzburg.

27 bus lines connect several parts of the city and the inner suburbs. Twenty-five bus lines connect the Landkreis Würzburg to the city.

=== Port ===
The Main river flows into the Rhine and is connected to the Danube via the Rhine-Main-Danube Canal. This makes it part of a trans-European waterway connecting the North Sea to the Black Sea.

=== Air ===
The city does not have its own airport. The nearest airports are:

- Nuremberg Airport (88.7 km away)
- Frankfurt Airport (102.8 km away)
- Stuttgart Airport (122.8 km away)
- Munich Airport (195 km away)

=== Bicycle ===
Designated bicycle paths are located throughout the city, and the Main-Radweg long-distance bicycle trail passes through the old town.

== Infrastructure ==
=== Utilities ===
The local public utility is Würzburger Versorgungs- und Verkehrs-GmbH supplying power, natural gas and water as well as public transportation and parking services. It also owns a majority stake in the port and runs local garbage collection/recycling. Heizkraftwerk Würzburg is owned by the utility.

=== Health care ===
Universitätsklinikum Würzburg provides health care services, with over 5,300 employees and over 1,400 hospital beds. Juliusspital also offers hospital services with 342 beds.

== Notable people ==
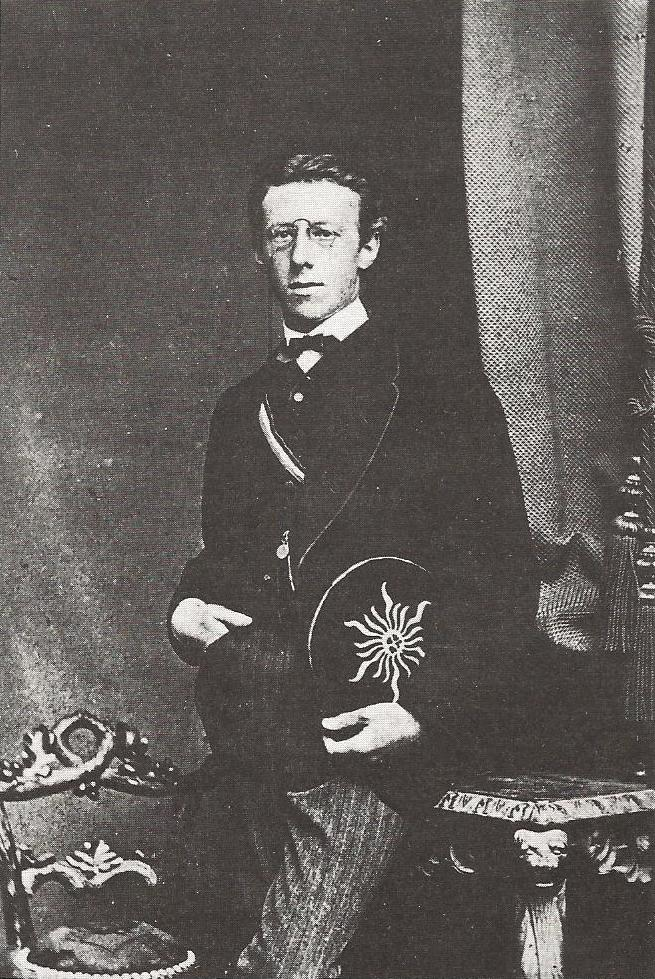
Philipp Stöhr

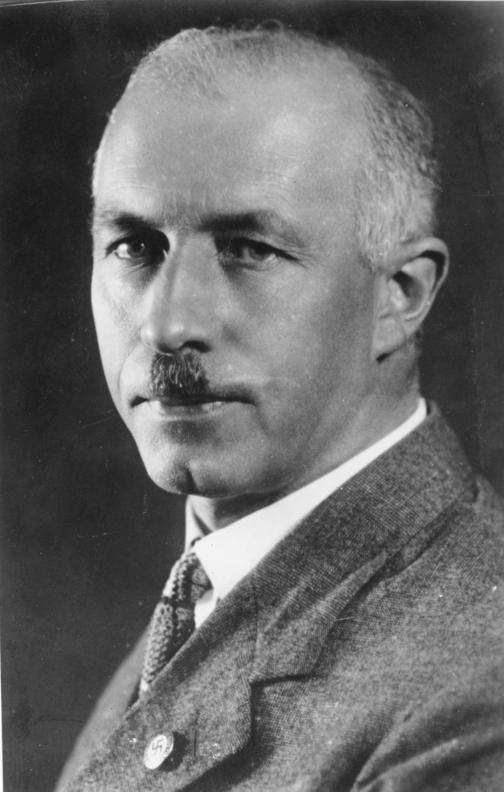
Gottfried Feder

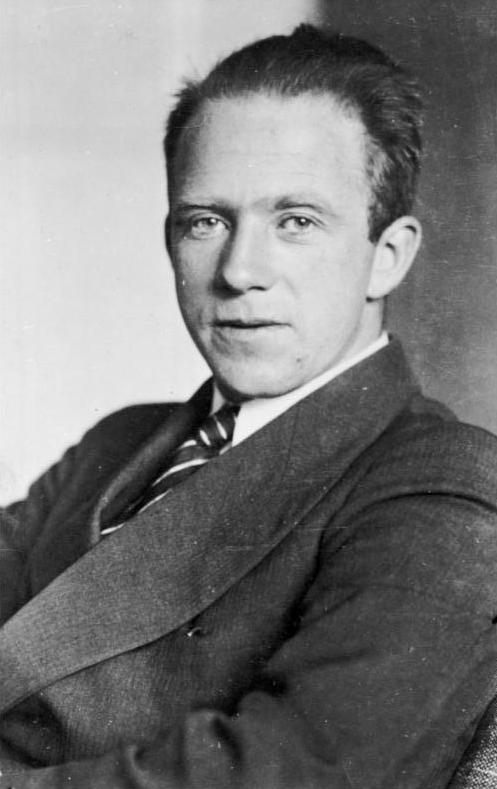
Werner Heisenberg

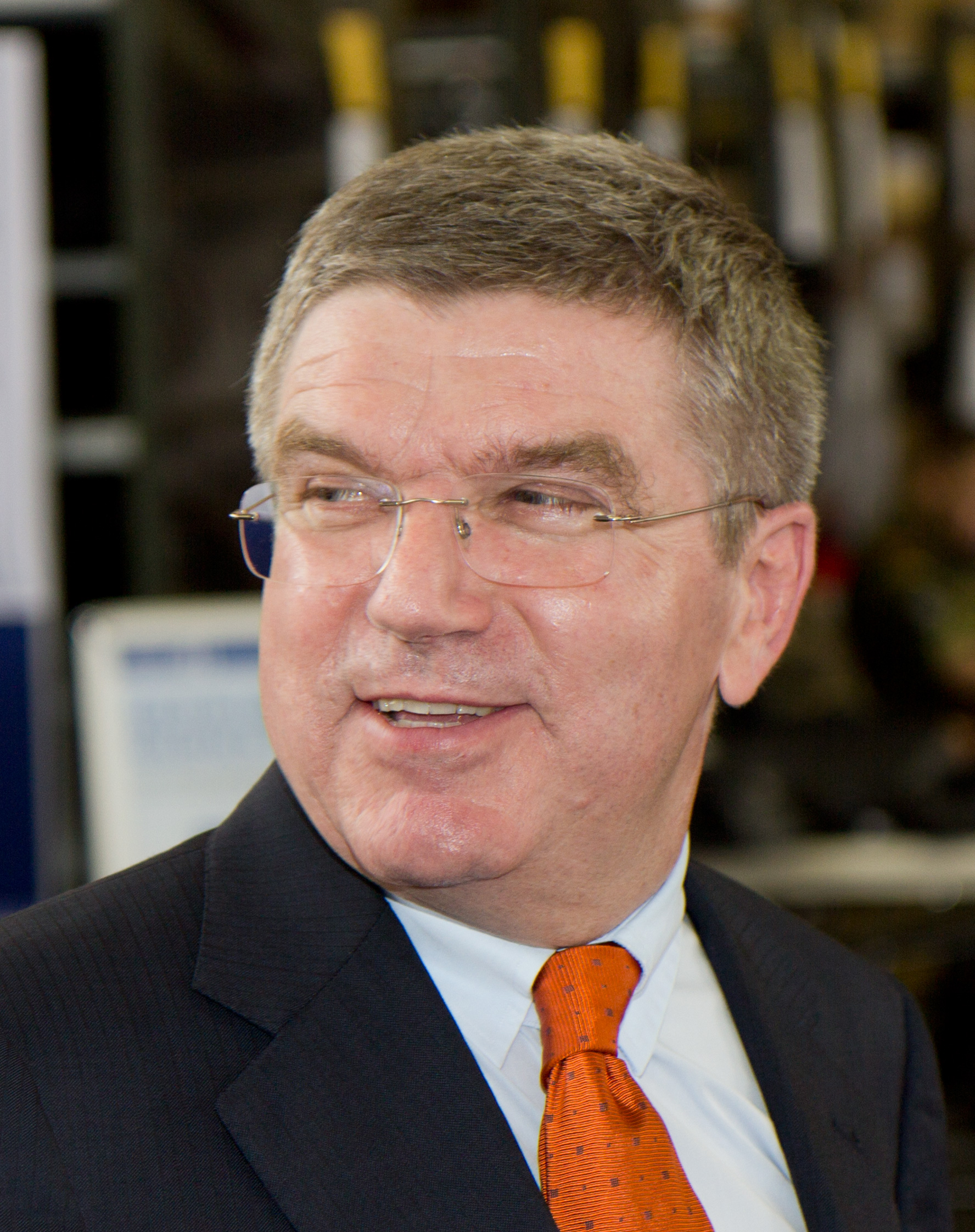
Thomas Bach

- Joseph Friedrich Abert (1879–1959), historian and archivist
- Heinrich Albert (1870–1950), classical guitarist and composer
- Yehuda Amichai ("Ludwig Pfeuffer"; 1924–2000), Israeli poet
- Thomas Bach (born 1953), Olympic gold medalist in fencing and IOC President from 2013 to 2025
- Frank Baumann (born 1975), footballer
- Fritz Bayerlein (1899–1970), World War II general
- Lorenz von Bibra (1459–1519), Prince-Bishop of Würzburg from 1495 to 1519
- Mark Bloch (born 1956), American artist
- Walter von Boetticher (1853–1945), historian and physician studied medicine at Würzburg
- Theodor Boveri (1862–1915), biologist and cytogeneticist
- Oskar Dirlewanger (1895–1945), war criminal and SS Commander of the Dirlewanger Brigade
- Christian von Ditfurth (born 1953), writer and historian
- Jutta Ditfurth (born 1951), sociologist, writer and historian
- Brendan Donovan (born 1997), baseball player St. Louis Cardinals
- Freimut Duve (1936–2020), politician and author
- Björn Emmerling (born 1975), field hockey player
- Gottfried Feder (1883–1941), economist, anti-capitalist and national socialist
- Georg Arbogast von Franckenstein (1825–1899), politician (Centre Party)
- Leonhard Frank (1882–1961), expressionist writer
- Manfred H. Grieb (1933–2012), entrepreneur and art collector
- Duane Harden (born 1971), dance music vocalist
- Werner Heisenberg (1901–1976), theoretical physicist
- Alfred Jodl (1890–1946), World War II general
- Wilhelm Keilmann (1908–1999), composer
- Friederich von Kleudgen (1856–1924), painter
- Maximilian Kleber (born 1992), basketball player
- Joseph Küffner (1776–1856), composer
- Selma Lohse (1883–1937), politician
- Luitpold, Prince Regent of Bavaria (1821–1912)
- Ernst Mayr (1904–2005), evolutionary biologist
- Waltraud Meier (born 1956), opera singer
- Julius Echter von Mespelbrunn (1545–1617), Prince-Bishop of Würzburg
- Johann Balthasar Neumann (1687–1753), architect and military engineer
- Dirk Nowitzki (born 1978), basketball player
- Franz Oberthür (1745–1831), theologian
- Christian "Cage" Palko (born 1973), American hip hop artist
- Burkard Polster (born 1965), mathematician who runs a YouTube channel
- Anthony Randolph (born 1989), basketball player
- Erich Rieger (born 1935), astrophysicist, discoverer of the Rieger periodicities that permeate the Solar System
- Tilman Riemenschneider (c. 1460–1531), German sculptor and woodcarver
- Emy Roeder (1890–1971), expressionist sculptor and artist
- Wilhelm Conrad Röntgen (1845–1923), physicist, discovered X-rays
- Julius von Sachs (1832–1897), botanist
- Frieda Schmitt-Lermann (born 1885), composer
- Michael Schuler (1901–1974), Olympic silver medal gymnast
- Philipp Franz von Siebold (1797–1866), physician and botanist
- Franz August Schenk von Stauffenberg (1834–1901), lawyer and politician
- Laura Stellbrink (born 1990), politician
- Philipp Stöhr (1849–1911), anatomist
- Stephanie Wehner (born 1977), quantum physicist

== Twin towns – sister cities ==
Würzburg is twinned with:

- Dundee, Scotland (1962)
- Caen, France (1962)
- Rochester, United States (1964)
- Mwanza, Tanzania (1966)
- Otsu, Japan (1979)
- Salamanca, Spain (1980)
- Suhl, Germany (1988)
- Umeå, Sweden (1992)
- (Republic of Ireland) Bray, Ireland (2000)
- Trutnov, Czech Republic (2008)
- Lviv, Ukraine (2023)
- Syracuse, Italy (2025)

Associated:

- Faribault, United States (1949)
- Nagasaki, Japan (2013)

== See also ==
- Bishopric of Würzburg
