= Christian von Ditfurth =

German author and historian

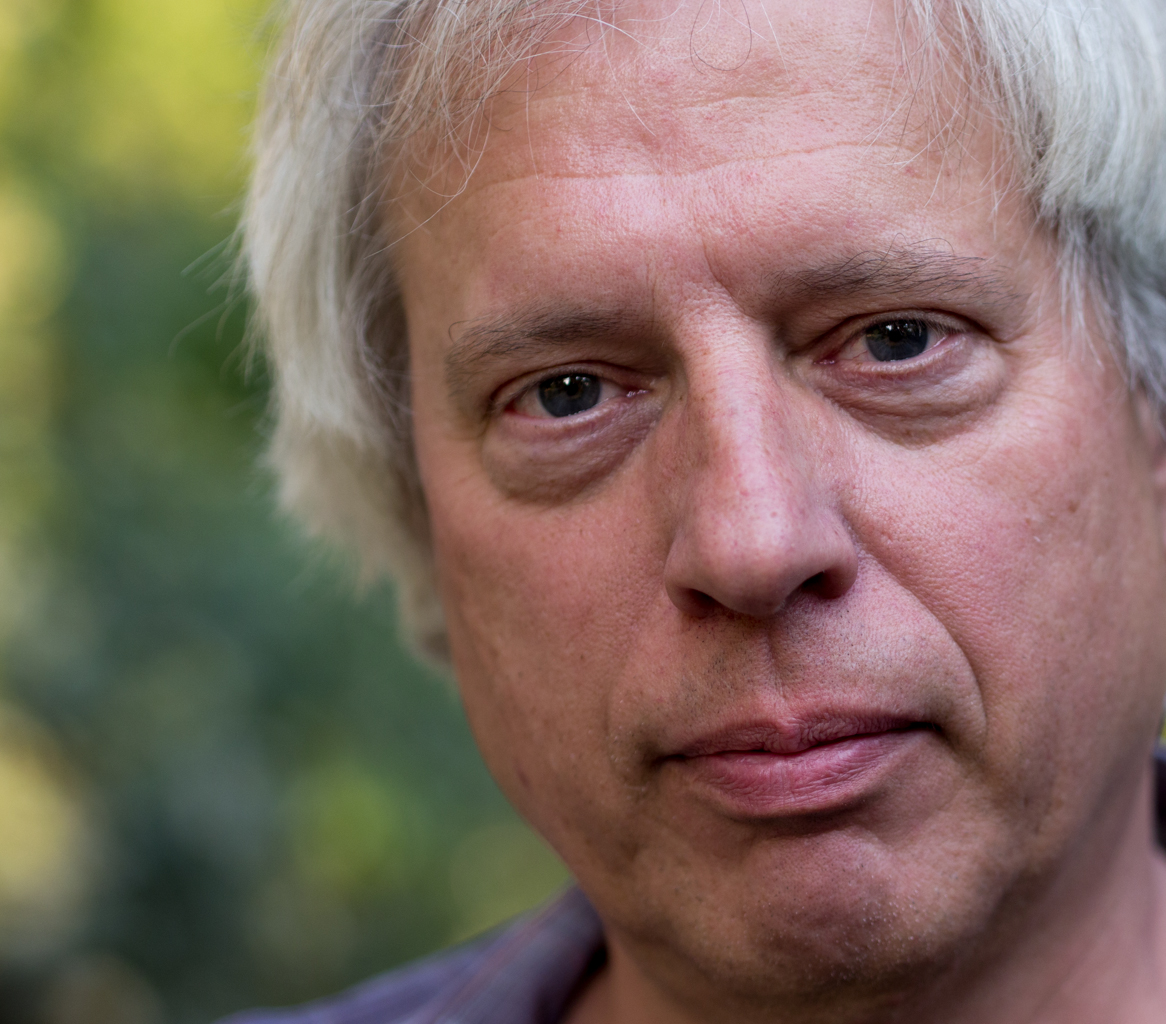
- Born: March 14, 1953 (age 73); Würzburg, Lower Franconia, Bavaria, West Germany
- Occupation: Author

Wolf-Christian von Ditfurth (born March 14, 1953) is a German author and historian. He was a member of the German Communist Party from 1973 to 1983. In January 1998, he joined the SPD, remaining a member for two years. During the twenty-first century he has not joined a political party.

As a journalist, Ditfurth has published numerous articles in Der Spiegel. Since 1999 also been a writer of sensational and detective novels.

A member of the Ditfurth family, his father Hoimar von Ditfurth was a journalist, doctor, popular television presenter and writer, while his sister, Jutta Ditfurth, is a journalist and politician.
