= Daria Schirman =

Russian physician and embryologist

- Education: University of Bern; University of Zurich
- Scientific career
- Fields: embryology

Daria Schirman, also called Dasha (May 24, 1874 – ?) was a Russian physician and embryologist.

== Life ==
She was born in Rostov-on-Don and studied at the University of Bern and the University of Zurich, graduating with her medical degree in 1898. Her research with Philipp Stöhr focused on the embryologic development of the guinea pig's large intestine. Not much is known about her later life.

== Publications ==
- Über die Rückbildung der Dickdarmzotten des Meerschweinchens (1898) [On the regression of the large intestine villi of the guinea pig]
