= Volker Arzt =

German physicist

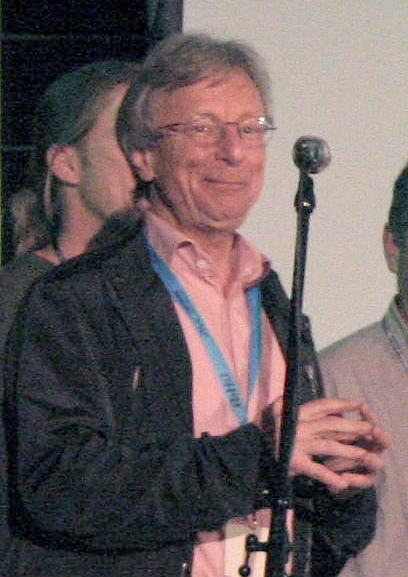
- Volker Arzt, 2009.
- Born: 1941 (age 84–85)
- Occupations: Television presenter, science journalist, physicist, and author

Volker Arzt (born 1941) is a German qualified physicist, science journalist, television presenter and author.

== Life ==
Volker Arzt studied in Stuttgart, among other places. Arzt became known in the 1970s through the ZDF series Querschnitt, which he presented together with Hoimar von Ditfurth. In the shows Die Balance der Biosphäre (The Balance of the Biosphere) and Kippt das Klima-Gleichgewicht (Is the Climate Balance Tipping?), he described the man-made climate catastrophe – caused by man's use of coal, oil and natural gas, and warned of its consequences.

Arzt was the editorial director of GEO-Film from 1984 to 1990 and has been working as a freelance author since 1990, primarily for ZDF. Together with Immanuel Birmelin, he wrote Do Animals Have Consciousness? (1993).

== Honors ==
He has received numerous national and international awards for his television documentaries, including the European Environmental Prize, the Canadian "Rocky", the Japan Award, the "Nautilus" in bronze, silver and gold, as well as the best science film at the GREEN SCREEN Eckernförde International Nature Film Festival. In 2009, Volker Arzt received the Görlitz Meridian Nature Film Prize for his entire film work. In 2018, he received the Heinz Sielmann Film Prize for Surprise Eggs at the GREEN SCREEN Festival.
