= Philipp Stöhr =

German anatomist and histologist

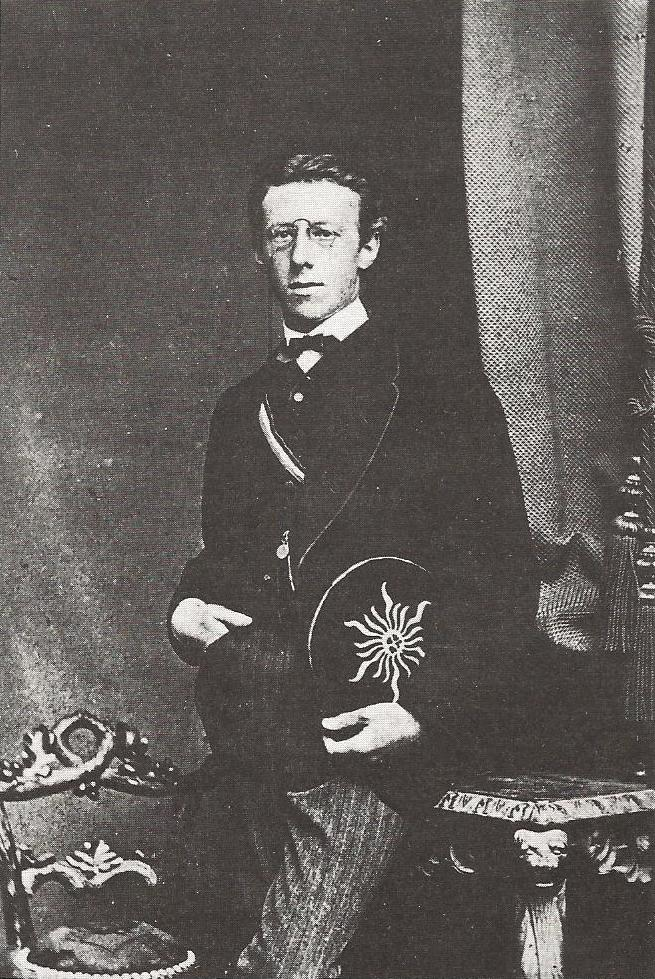
Philipp Stöhr (1872)

Philipp Stöhr (13 June 1849 in Würzburg – 4 November 1911) was a German anatomist and histologist.

== Education and Professorship ==
He studied medicine in Würzburg, where in 1869 he became a member of the Corps Bavaria Würzburg. As a professor at the University of Würzburg, he developed a leading school of histology and embryology.

== Published works ==
He was the author of a landmark textbook on histology and microscopic anatomy, titled Lehrbuch der Histologie und der mikroskopischen Anatomie des Menschen : mit Einschluß der mikroskopischen Technik (1887), being published over many editions. (Digital 16th edition from 1915 by the University and State Library Düsseldorf) Stöhr's work was translated into English, and published as:

- "Text-book of histology, including the microscopical technique", (1898).
- "Stöhr's histology : arranged upon an embroyological basis", (1906).
