= Jutta Ditfurth =

German sociologist, writer and politician

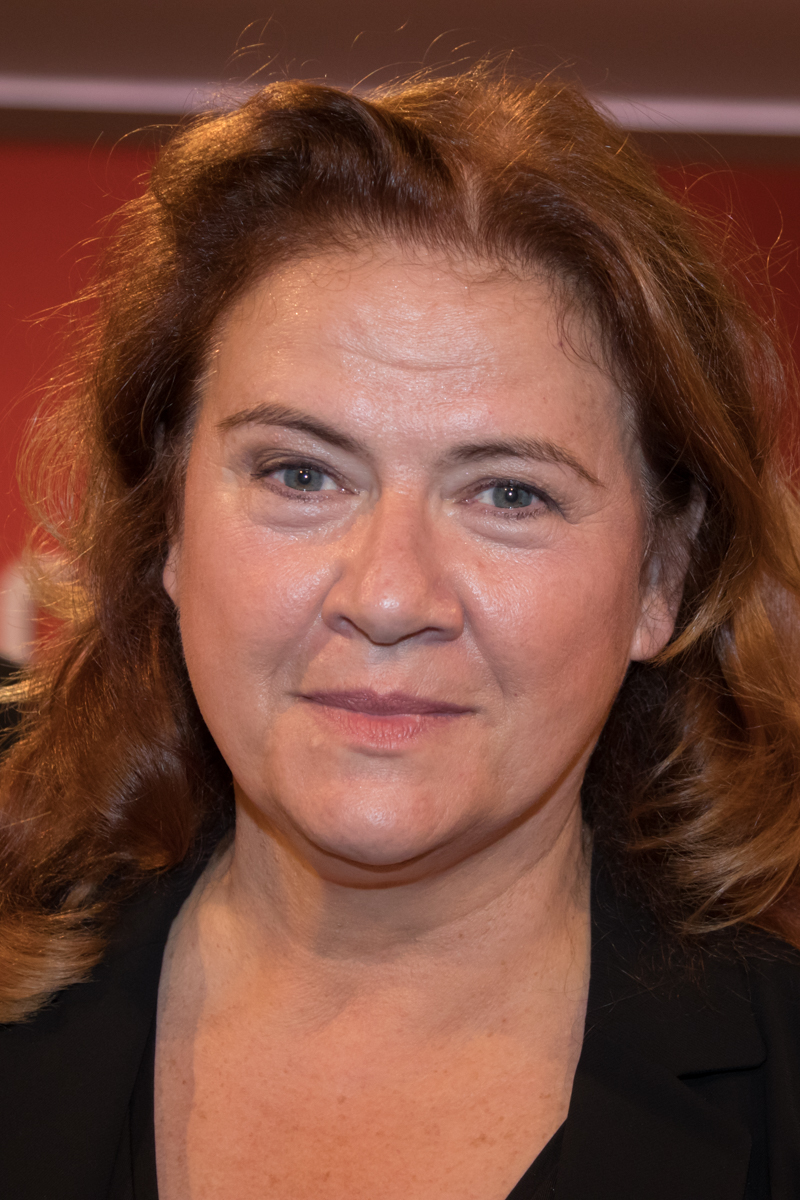
Ditfurth in 2017

Jutta Gerta Armgard von Ditfurth (born 29 September 1951) is a German sociologist, writer, and radical ecologist politician. Born into the noble house of Ditfurth, members of which had been noble ministeriales invested with hereditary administrative titles and offices in various regions of today's Saxony-Anhalt and Lower Saxony and elsewhere in the Holy Roman Empire, she is a daughter of the German physician and science journalist Hoimar von Ditfurth and a sister of the historian Christian von Ditfurth. In 1978, she attempted to have her name legally changed to remove the nobiliary particle "von" and to become the plainer Jutta Ditfurth, but was refused the change by the authorities. She is nonetheless known throughout Germany by her adopted non-noble name, which she prefers.

== Early life ==
Ditfurth studied art history, sociology, political science, economic history, and philosophy in Germany, Scotland, and the United States, at the universities of Heidelberg, Hamburg, Freiburg, Glasgow, Detroit, and Bielefeld, graduating as a sociologist in 1977. After her final graduation, she worked as a sociologist, journalist, and writer, and also as a shift worker.

== Politics ==
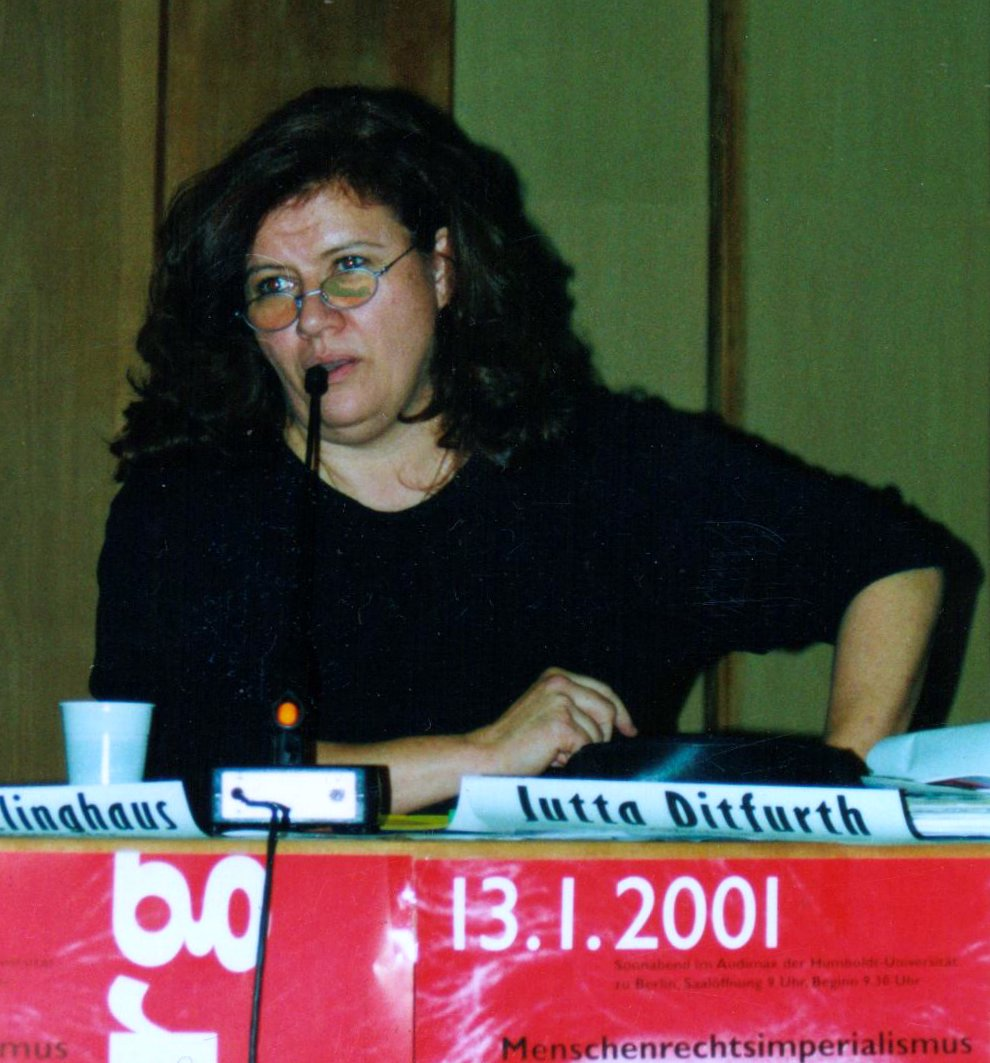
Ditfurth in 2001

Ditfurth has been politically active within the New Left since the early 1970s, joining internationalist and feminist groups, as well as participating in the nascent Green and anti-nuclear movement. In 1980, she became a member of the newly founded German Green Party; from 1984 till 1988 she was one of the three party leaders. In December 1988, the national convention ("Bundesdelegiertenkonferenz") of the party voted with 214 to 186 delegates to end Ditfurth's leadership. Towards the late 1980s, she became highly critical of the subsequent trajectory of the German Green Party, which she described as counterrevolutionary, hierarchical, and nepotistic; she left the Greens in 1991.

As a candidate on an international list of the Greek left-wing party New Left Current during the 1999 European elections, she ran a campaign critical of the German military and NATO involvement in the Kosovo War, but did not win enough votes to win a seat in the European Parliament. In 2000, she co-founded the minor German party Ecological Left, of which she remains a member and on whose ticket she won a seat in the city parliament of Frankfurt in 2001 and 2011. In 2007, she published a biography of the Red Army Faction member Ulrike Meinhof.

She is currently based in Frankfurt. Her works remain largely untranslated into English.

== Publications ==
- Der Baron, die Juden und die Nazis. Reise in eine Familiengeschichte. ("The Baron, the Jews, and the Nazis: Journey Into a Family History"), Hoffmann und Campe, Hamburg, 2013, ISBN 978-3-455-50273-2 (on her family ties to Nazism prior to 1945)
- Zeit des Zorns. Warum wir uns vom Kapitalismus befreien müssen [German] ("Time of Anger: Why We Must Free Ourselves from Capitalism"). Westend Verlag, Frankfurt/Main. 2012. ISBN 978-3-86489-027-7.
- Zeit des Zorns: Streitschrift für eine gerechte Gesellschaft. [German] ("Time of Anger: The Argument for a Just Society"). Droemer Knaur, München. 2009. ISBN 978-3-426-27504-7.
- "Zahltag, Junker Joschka! (Payday, Junker Joschka!) – German pdf" (PDF). Archived from the original (PDF) on 17 September 2017.
- Ulrike Meinhof: Die Biographie (in German). Ullstein Verlag GmbH. 2007. ISBN 978-3-550-08728-8.
- Entspannt in die Barbarei: Esoterik, (Öko-)Faschismus und Biozentrismus ("Stress-Relieved Ways Into Barbarism: Esotericism, (Eco-)Fascism, and Biocentrism"). Konkret Literatur. 1996. ISBN 978-3-89458-148-0. [German] (on the political trajectory of the Green Party which she criticizes ever since leaving them)
- Lebe wild und gefährlich. Radikalökologische Perspektiven. [German] ("Live Wild and Dangerous. Radical Ecological Perspectives"). Kiepenheuer & Witsch, Köln. 1991.
- Träumen, Kämpfen, Verwirklichen. Politische Texte bis 1987. [German] ("Dreams, Struggles, Implementations: Political Writings until 1987"). Kiepenheuer & Witsch, Köln. 1988. ISBN 3-462-01903-1.
- with Rose Glaser (1987). Die tägliche legale Verseuchung unserer Flüsse und wie wir uns dagegen wehren können, Ein Handbuch mit Aktionsteil. [German] ("The Daily Legal Pollution of Our Rivers and How to Defend Ourselves Against It. An Action Handbook."). Rasch und Röhring, Hamburg/Zürich. ISBN 3-89136-163-7.
