= Schiemann =

Schiemann is a surname. Notable people with the surname are:

- Elisabeth Schiemann (1881–1972), German geneticist, crop researcher and resistance fighter in the Third Reich
- Konrad Schiemann, PC (born 1937), British barrister and judge
- Paul Schiemann (1876–1944), Baltic German journalist, editor and politician known for his commitment to minority rights
- Peter Schiemann (c.1980–2005), police officer killed in the Mayerthorpe tragedy on March 3, 2005, in the Canadian province of Alberta

== See also ==
- Balz-Schiemann reaction, converts a primary aromatic amine to an aryl fluoride via a diazonium tetrafluorofluoroborate intermediate
- Scheidemann
